= Harrogate Borough Council elections =

Local government elections in North Yorkshire, England

One third of Harrogate Borough Council in North Yorkshire, England was elected each year, followed by one year without election. From the final boundary changes in 2002, 54 councillors were elected from 35 wards. The last elections were held in 2018, ahead of the abolition of Harrogate Borough Council on 31 March 2023. Its functions transferred to North Yorkshire Council. The first elections to the North Yorkshire Council took place on 5 May 2022, when 21 councillors were elected from 21 divisions in the Borough of Harrogate.

== Political control ==
The first election to the council was held in 1973, initially operating as a shadow authority alongside the outgoing authorities until it came into its powers on 1 April 1974. Political control from 1974 until its abolition in 2023 was as follows:

Party in control	Years
Conservative	1974–1990
No overall control	1990–1994
Liberal Democrats	1994–2002
No overall control	2002–2004
Conservative	2004–2006
No overall control	2006–2010
Conservative	2010–2023

=== Leadership ===
The leaders of the council from 1985 until the council's abolition in 2023 were:

Councillor	Party	From	To
Freddie Rotherham	Conservative		Jan 1985
Alec McCarroll	Conservative	1985	May 1988
Nigel Kitson	Conservative	27 May 1988	May 1990
Phil Willis (Note: Described as de facto leader from May 1990 as chair of council's policy and resources committee, before being formally named leader in 1991.)	Liberal Democrats	May 1990	May 1997
Michael Johnston	Liberal Democrats	May 1997	11 Oct 2000
Geoff Webber	Liberal Democrats	11 Oct 2000	May 2003
Mike Gardner	Conservative	16 May 2003	May 2011
Don Mackenzie	Conservative	20 May 2011	21 May 2012
Anthony Alton	Conservative	21 May 2012	12 Jun 2014
Richard Cooper	Conservative	12 Jun 2014	31 Mar 2023

== Council elections ==
- 1973 Harrogate Borough Council election
- 1976 Harrogate Borough Council election
- 1979 Harrogate Borough Council election
- 1983 Harrogate Borough Council election (New ward boundaries)
- 1984 Harrogate Borough Council election
- 1986 Harrogate Borough Council election
- 1987 Harrogate Borough Council election
- 1988 Harrogate Borough Council election
- 1990 Harrogate Borough Council election
- 1991 Harrogate Borough Council election
- 1992 Harrogate Borough Council election (Borough boundary changes took place but the number of seats remained the same)
- 1994 Harrogate Borough Council election (Borough boundary changes took place but the number of seats remained the same)
- 1995 Harrogate Borough Council election
- 1996 Harrogate Borough Council election
- 1998 Harrogate Borough Council election
- 1999 Harrogate Borough Council election
- 2000 Harrogate Borough Council election
- 2002 Harrogate Borough Council election (New ward boundaries reduced the number of seats by 5)
- 2003 Harrogate Borough Council election
- 2004 Harrogate Borough Council election
- 2006 Harrogate Borough Council election
- 2007 Harrogate Borough Council election
- 2008 Harrogate Borough Council election
- 2010 Harrogate Borough Council election
- 2011 Harrogate Borough Council election
- 2012 Harrogate Borough Council election
- 2014 Harrogate Borough Council election
- 2015 Harrogate Borough Council election
- 2016 Harrogate Borough Council election
- 2018 Harrogate Borough Council election (New ward boundaries)

== Borough result maps ==
2002 results map

2003 results map

2004 results map

2006 results map

2007 results map

2008 results map

2010 results map

2011 results map

2012 results map

2014 results map

2015 results map

2016 results map

2018 results map

== By-election results ==
=== 1997-2001 ===
Fountains By-Election 26 June 1997
Party	Candidate	Votes	%	±%
Liberal Democrats		196	54.2	−24.0
Conservative		166	45.6	+45.6
Majority		30	8.6	
Turnout		362		
Liberal Democrats hold		Swing		

Ripon East By-Election 26 June 1997
Party	Candidate	Votes	%	±%
Conservative		290	41.3	−3.2
Liberal Democrats		255	36.3	+36.3
Labour		157	22.4	−33.1
Majority		35	5.0	
Turnout		702	17.0	
Conservative gain from Liberal Democrats		Swing		

Ripon West By-Election 26 June 1997
Party	Candidate	Votes	%	±%
Liberal Democrats		461	59.9	−3.0
Conservative		309	40.1	+3.0
Majority		152	19.8	
Turnout		770		
Liberal Democrats hold		Swing		

Lower Nidderdale By-Election 30 July 1998
Party	Candidate	Votes	%	±%
Liberal Democrats		378	50.3	+12.1
Conservative		353	47.0	−6.8
Labour		20	2.7	−5.3
Majority		25	3.3	
Turnout		751		
Liberal Democrats gain from Conservative		Swing		

Marston Moor By-Election 4 February 1999
Party	Candidate	Votes	%	±%
Liberal Democrats		486	61.4	+24.4
Conservative		278	35.1	−15.9
Labour		27	3.4	−8.6
Majority		208	26.3	
Turnout		791		
Liberal Democrats gain from Conservative		Swing		

Pateley Bridge By-Election 24 February 2000
Party	Candidate	Votes	%	±%
Liberal Democrats		506	58.6	+2.4
Conservative		345	39.9	+1.7
Labour		13	1.5	−4.1
Majority		161	18.7	
Turnout		864	43.6	
Liberal Democrats hold		Swing		

Newby By-Election 24 February 2000
Party	Candidate	Votes	%	±%
Conservative		639	45.8	−24.9
Liberal Democrats		285	20.4	+20.4
Independent		285	20.4	+20.4
Labour		187	13.4	−16.0
Majority		354	25.4	
Turnout		1,396		
Conservative hold		Swing		

=== 2001-2005 ===
New Park By-Election 6 May 2004
Party	Candidate	Votes	%	±%
Liberal Democrats		910	65.4	−0.3
Conservative		417	30.0	+3.1
Independent		33	2.4	+2.4
Labour		31	2.2	−5.3
Majority		493	35.4	
Turnout		1,391	34.9	
Liberal Democrats hold		Swing		

=== 2005-2010 ===
New Park By-Election 11 September 2008
Party	Candidate	Votes	%	±%
Liberal Democrats	Matthew Webber	843	61.1	−14.2
Conservative	Sharon Bentley	491	35.6	+20.9
Labour	Andrew Gray	45	3.3	+3.3
Majority		352	25.5	
Turnout		1,379	33.7	
Liberal Democrats hold		Swing		

Bilton By-Election 19 February 2009
Party	Candidate	Votes	%	±%
Liberal Democrats	Clare McKenzie	902	50.4	+1.0
Conservative	Sharon Bentley	673	37.6	−6.9
BNP	Steven Gill	164	9.2	+3.0
Labour	Andrew Gray	51	2.8	+2.8
Majority		229	12.8	
Turnout		1,790	42.0	
Liberal Democrats hold		Swing		

Starbeck By-Election 27 August 2009
Party	Candidate	Votes	%	±%
Liberal Democrats	Janet Law	886	63.4	−8.8
Conservative	Dennis Pinchen	252	18.0	+5.0
Independent	David Rimington	178	12.7	+12.7
Labour	Geoff Foxall	82	5.9	+0.8
Majority		634	45.4	
Turnout		1,398	31.8	
Liberal Democrats hold		Swing		

=== 2010-2018 ===
Woodfield By-Election 7 January 2010
Party	Candidate	Votes	%	±%
Liberal Democrats	Greta Knight	688	62.6	+4.1
Conservative	Heather Adderley	246	22.4	+7.5
BNP	Steven Gill	92	8.4	−4.1
Labour	Daniel Maguire	73	6.6	−7.5
Majority		442	40.2	
Turnout		1,099	27.0	
Liberal Democrats gain from Conservative		Swing		

Previous councillor in Woodfield had been elected as a Liberal Democrat and then defected to the Conservatives.

Rossett By-Election 15 November 2012
Party	Candidate	Votes	%	±%
Liberal Democrats	David Siddans	807	46.3	+22.3
Conservative	Rebecca Burnett	704	40.4	−24.2
UKIP	Salvina Bashforth	127	7.3	+7.3
Labour	Patricia Foxall	106	6.1	−5.3
Majority		103	7.9	
Turnout		1,744		
Liberal Democrats gain from Conservative		Swing		

Bilton By-Election 15 November 2012
Party	Candidate	Votes	%	±%
Liberal Democrats	Val Rodgers	623	46.0	+8.8
Conservative	Neil Bentley	395	29.2	−16.1
Labour	Andrew Gray	208	15.4	+2.1
UKIP	David Simister	127	9.4	+9.4
Majority		228	16.8	
Turnout		1,353		
Liberal Democrats gain from Conservative		Swing		

Hookstone By-Election 17 July 2014
Party	Candidate	Votes	%	±%
Liberal Democrats	Clare Skardon	886	51.7	+9.1
Conservative	Phil Headford	551	32.1	−1.9
UKIP	Alan Henderson	206	12.0	−4.3
Labour	Pat Foxall	71	4.1	−3.1
Majority		335	19.5	
Turnout		1,714		
Liberal Democrats hold		Swing		

Washburn By-Election 28 September 2017
Party	Candidate	Votes	%	±%
Conservative	Victoria Oldham	363	74.5	−0.5
Labour	Laura Dinning	61	12.5	−0.9
Green	Paul Trewhitt	44	9.0	+9.0
Yorkshire	Jack Render	19	3.9	+3.9
Majority		302	62.0	
Turnout		487		
Conservative hold		Swing		

=== 2018-2023 ===
Knaresborough Scriven Park By-Election 29 July 2021
Party	Candidate	Votes	%	±%
Liberal Democrats	Hannah Gostlow	635	56.6	+19.5
Conservative	Jacqueline Renton	384	34.3	−4.1
Labour	Sharon-Theresa Calvert	91	8.1	−16.4
UKIP	Harvey Alexander	11	1.0	N/A
Turnout		1,124	31.16	
Liberal Democrats gain from Conservative		Swing		

Wathvale By-Election 5 May 2022
Party	Candidate	Votes	%	±%
Conservative	Sam Green	686	52.6	−13.9
Liberal Democrats	Chris Knight	321	24.6	+3.8
Green	Hannah Corlett	297	22.8	+22.8
Majority		365	28.0	
Turnout		1,304		
Conservative hold		Swing		
