= 2014 Harrogate Borough Council election =

2014 UK local government election

| ← 2012 | 22 May 2014 | 2015 → |

One third of seats (19) are up for election
| | First party | Second party |
|---|---|---|
| Party | Conservative | Liberal Democrats |
| Seats won | 9 | 8 |
| Seat change | ▲2 | ▼3 |
| Popular vote | 11,195 | 8,077 |
| Percentage | 37.0% | 26.7% |
| Swing | -4.3% | -25.4% |
- Map showing the results of the 2014 Harrogate Borough Council elections.

Elections to Harrogate Borough Council were held on 22 May 2014. A third of the council was up for election, with voting only in the urban wards of Harrogate, Knaresborough and Ripon. The elections were held on the same day as the British local elections and the European Parliament elections. Each ward up for election returned a councillor for a four-year term of office.

== Electoral system ==
All locally-registered electors (British, Irish, Commonwealth and European Union citizens) who were aged 18 or over on Thursday 22 May 2014 were entitled to vote in the local elections. Those who were temporarily away from their ordinary address (for example, away working, on holiday, in student accommodation or in hospital) were also entitled to vote in the local elections, although those who had moved abroad and registered as overseas electors cannot vote in the local elections. It is possible to register to vote at more than one address (such as a university student who had a term-time address and lives at home during holidays) at the discretion of the local Electoral Register Office, but it remains an offence to vote more than once in the same local government election.

== Campaign ==
The elections saw new parties contest Harrogate for the first time, such as the TUSC and a number of Independents. The Conservatives and Labour fielded a full slate of the 19 candidates, UK Independence Party fielding 17, 16 Liberal Democrats, the Green Party 8, 3 Independents and 1 Trade Unionist and Socialist Coalition candidate.

== Results ==
Harrogate Borough Council election, 2014
| Party | Seats | Gains | Losses | Net gain/loss | Seats % | Votes % | Votes | +/− |
|---|---|---|---|---|---|---|---|---|
| Conservative | 9 | 3 | 1 | +2 | | 37.0 | 11,195 | −4.3 |
| Liberal Democrats | 8 | 0 | 3 | -3 | | 26.7 | 8,077 | -25.4 |
| UKIP | 0 | 0 | 0 | | | 17.7 | 5,363 | +17.7 |
| Labour | 0 | 0 | 0 | | | 10.4 | 3,145 | +10.4 |
| Green | 0 | 0 | 0 | | | 3.3 | 988 | +3.3 |
| TUSC | 0 | 0 | 0 | | | 0.2 | 66 | +0.2 |
| Independent | 2 | 1 | 0 | +1 | | 3.1 | 1,410 | -2.2 |

=== By electoral division ===
A total of 19 wards in Harrogate Borough Council were up for election in Harrogate, Ripon and Knaresborough. The last election was held in the 2010 local elections.

==== Bilton ====
Bilton
| Party | Candidate | Votes | % | ±% |
|---|---|---|---|---|
| Conservative | Paul Haslam | 500 | 30.4% | −9.8 |
| Liberal Democrats | Robert O'Neill | 488 | 29.6% | −24.3 |
| UKIP | David Simister | 435 | 26.4% | +26.4 |
| Labour | Andrew Gray | 130 | 7.9% | +7.9 |
| Green | Claire Hawkins | 93 | 5.7% | +5.7 |
| Majority | | | | |
| Turnout | | 0,000 | 00.0% | |
| Conservative gain from Liberal Democrats | | Swing | | |

==== Granby ====
Granby
| Party | Candidate | Votes | % | ±% |
|---|---|---|---|---|
| Liberal Democrats | John Fox | 731 | 47.5% | −23.2 |
| Conservative | Steve Marshall | 333 | 21.6% | −18.6 |
| UKIP | Hugh Whiteside | 284 | 18.5% | +18.5 |
| Labour | Robert Darlington | 160 | 10.4% | +10.4 |
| Independent | Arif Ahmad | 31 | 2.0% | +2.0 |
| Majority | | | | |
| Turnout | | 0,000 | 00.0% | |
| Liberal Democrats hold | | Swing | | |

==== Harlow Moor ====
Harlow Moor
| Party | Candidate | Votes | % | ±% |
|---|---|---|---|---|
| Liberal Democrats | Justin Chan | 0,000 | 00.0% | +0.0 |
| UKIP | David Thompson | 0,000 | 00.0% | +0.0 |
| Conservative | Don Mackenzie | 0,000 | 00.0% | +0.0 |
| Labour | Kevin McNerney | 0,000 | 00.0% | +0.0 |
| Majority | | | | |
| Turnout | | 0,000 | 00.0% | |
| gain from | | Swing | | |

==== High Harrogate ====
High Harrogate
| Party | Candidate | Votes | % | ±% |
|---|---|---|---|---|
| Labour | Helen Burke | 0,000 | 00.0% | +0.0 |
| UKIP | Philip Burke | 0,000 | 00.0% | +0.0 |
| Conservative | Ben Johnson | 0,000 | 00.0% | +0.0 |
| Liberal Democrats | Diane Stokes | 0,000 | 00.0% | +0.0 |
| TUSC | Paul Viney | 0,000 | 00.0% | +0.0 |
| Majority | | | | |
| Turnout | | 0,000 | 00.0% | |
| gain from | | Swing | | |

==== Hookstone ====
Hookstone
| Party | Candidate | Votes | % | ±% |
|---|---|---|---|---|
| Labour | Lorraine Ferris | 128 | 00.0% | +0.0 |
| Conservative | Phil Headford | 607 | 00.0% | +0.0 |
| Liberal Democrats | Pat Marsh | 760 | 00.0% | +0.0 |
| UKIP | Steven O'Neill | 291 | 00.0% | +0.0 |
| Majority | | | | |
| Turnout | | 1,786 | 00.0% | |
| gain from | | Swing | | |

==== Knaresborough East ====
Knaresborough East
| Party | Candidate | Votes | % | ±% |
|---|---|---|---|---|
| Conservative | Sue Batt | 0,000 | 00.0% | +0.0 |
| UKIP | Carolina Bruce | 0,000 | 00.0% | +0.0 |
| Labour | David Bulmer | 0,000 | 00.0% | +0.0 |
| Liberal Democrats | Christine Willoughby | 0,000 | 00.0% | +0.0 |
| Majority | | | | |
| Turnout | | 0,000 | 00.0% | |
| gain from | | Swing | | |

==== Knaresborough King James ====
Knaresborough King James
| Party | Candidate | Votes | % | ±% |
|---|---|---|---|---|
| Green | Nick Bates | 126 | 00.0% | +0.0 |
| UKIP | Laurence Bruce | 367 | 00.0% | +0.0 |
| Liberal Democrats | David Goode | 614 | 00.0% | +0.0 |
| Labour | Diane Maguire | 130 | 00.0% | +0.0 |
| Conservative | Mike Renton | 603 | 00.0% | +0.0 |
| Majority | | | | |
| Turnout | | 0,000 | 00.0% | |
| gain from | | Swing | | |

==== Knaresborough Scriven Park ====
Knaresborough Scriven Park
| Party | Candidate | Votes | % | ±% |
|---|---|---|---|---|
| Conservative | Tony Handley | 0,000 | 00.0% | +0.0 |
| Liberal Democrats | Anne Jones | 0,000 | 00.0% | +0.0 |
| UKIP | Chris Royston | 0,000 | 00.0% | +0.0 |
| Labour | Jan Williams | 0,000 | 00.0% | +0.0 |
| Majority | | | | |
| Turnout | | 0,000 | 00.0% | |
| gain from | | Swing | | |

==== Low Harrogate ====
Low Harrogate
| Party | Candidate | Votes | % | ±% |
|---|---|---|---|---|
| Conservative | John Radcliffe | 0,000 | 00.0% | +0.0 |
| Liberal Democrats | Jeanette Marshall | 0,000 | 00.0% | +0.0 |
| Labour | Marlene Shreeve | 0,000 | 00.0% | +0.0 |
| UKIP | Ruth Whiteside | 0,000 | 00.0% | +0.0 |
| Majority | | | | |
| Turnout | | 0,000 | 00.0% | |
| gain from | | Swing | | |

==== New Park ====
New Park
| Party | Candidate | Votes | % | ±% |
|---|---|---|---|---|
| Conservative | John Radcliffe | 0,000 | 00.0% | +0.0 |
| UKIP | Andrew Dennis | 0,000 | 00.0% | +0.0 |
| Green | Conor Hawkins | 0,000 | 00.0% | +0.0 |
| Labour | Nicholas Knott | 0,000 | 00.0% | +0.0 |
| Liberal Democrats | Matthew Webber | 0,000 | 00.0% | +0.0 |
| Majority | | | | |
| Turnout | | 0,000 | 00.0% | |
| gain from | | Swing | | |

==== Pannal ====
Pannal
| Party | Candidate | Votes | % | ±% |
|---|---|---|---|---|
| Labour | Helen Evison | 0,000 | 00.0% | +0.0 |
| Liberal Democrats | Andrew Kempston-Parkes | 0,000 | 00.0% | +0.0 |
| Conservative | John Mann | 0,000 | 00.0% | +0.0 |
| UKIP | Ben Stockburn | 0,000 | 00.0% | +0.0 |
| Green | Richard Wilson | 0,000 | 00.0% | +0.0 |
| Majority | | | | |
| Turnout | | 0,000 | 00.0% | |
| gain from | | Swing | | |

==== Ripon Minster ====
Ripon Minster
| Party | Candidate | Votes | % | ±% |
|---|---|---|---|---|
| Green | Elizabeth Barclay | 0,000 | 00.0% | +0.0 |
| Labour | Vivienne Graham | 0,000 | 00.0% | +0.0 |
| Independent | Sid Hawke | 0,000 | 00.0% | +0.0 |
| Conservative | Stuart Martin | 0,000 | 00.0% | +0.0 |
| Majority | | | | |
| Turnout | | 0,000 | 00.0% | |
| gain from | | Swing | | |

==== Ripon Moorside ====
Ripon Moorside
| Party | Candidate | Votes | % | ±% |
|---|---|---|---|---|
| UKIP | Jeremy Banyard | 0,000 | 00.0% | +0.0 |
| Independent | Pauline McHardy | 0,000 | 00.0% | +0.0 |
| Labour | Nick Murray | 0,000 | 00.0% | +0.0 |
| Conservative | Mick Stanley | 0,000 | 00.0% | +0.0 |
| Majority | | | | |
| Turnout | | 0,000 | 00.0% | |
| gain from | | Swing | | |

==== Ripon Spa ====
Ripon Spa
| Party | Candidate | Votes | % | ±% |
|---|---|---|---|---|
| UKIP | Alan Henderson | 0,000 | 00.0% | +0.0 |
| Labour | Andrew Murday | 0,000 | 00.0% | +0.0 |
| Conservative | Alan Skidmore | 0,000 | 00.0% | +0.0 |
| Majority | | | | |
| Turnout | | 0,000 | 00.0% | |
| gain from | | Swing | | |

==== Rossett ====
Rossett
| Party | Candidate | Votes | % | ±% |
|---|---|---|---|---|
| UKIP | Salvina Bashforth | 0,000 | 00.0% | +0.0 |
| Labour | Kevin Bolt | 0,000 | 00.0% | +0.0 |
| Conservative | Rebecca Burnett | 0,000 | 00.0% | +0.0 |
| Liberal Democrats | David Siddans | 0,000 | 00.0% | +0.0 |
| Majority | | | | |
| Turnout | | 0,000 | 00.0% | |
| gain from | | Swing | | |

==== Saltergate ====
Saltergate
| Party | Candidate | Votes | % | ±% |
|---|---|---|---|---|
| UKIP | Paul Bramley | 0,000 | 00.0% | +0.0 |
| Green | Shaun Lowry | 0,000 | 00.0% | +0.0 |
| Labour | Janet Morrow | 0,000 | 00.0% | +0.0 |
| Liberal Democrats | Allan Reynolds | 0,000 | 00.0% | +0.0 |
| Conservative | Graham Swift | 0,000 | 00.0% | +0.0 |
| Majority | | | | |
| Turnout | | 0,000 | 00.0% | |
| gain from | | Swing | | |

==== Starbeck ====
Starbeck
| Party | Candidate | Votes | % | ±% |
|---|---|---|---|---|
| Liberal Democrats | Philip Broadbank | 0,000 | 00.0% | +0.0 |
| Green | Gillian Charters | 0,000 | 00.0% | +0.0 |
| Conservative | Phillip Dixon | 0,000 | 00.0% | +0.0 |
| Labour | Geoff Foxall | 0,000 | 00.0% | +0.0 |
| Majority | | | | |
| Turnout | | 0,000 | 00.0% | |
| gain from | | Swing | | |

==== Stray ====
Stray
| Party | Candidate | Votes | % | ±% |
|---|---|---|---|---|
| Labour | Pat Foxall | 0,000 | 00.0% | +0.0 |
| UKIP | John Hanson | 0,000 | 00.0% | +0.0 |
| Liberal Democrats | Clare Skardon | 0,000 | 00.0% | +0.0 |
| Conservative | Cliff Trotter | 0,000 | 00.0% | +0.0 |
| Majority | | | | |
| Turnout | | 0,000 | 00.0% | |
| gain from | | Swing | | |

==== Woodfield ====
Woodfield
| Party | Candidate | Votes | % | ±% |
|---|---|---|---|---|
| UKIP | Harvey Alexander | 0,000 | 00.0% | +0.0 |
| Green | Helen Compton | 0,000 | 00.0% | +0.0 |
| Conservative | Mary Dilworth | 0,000 | 00.0% | +0.0 |
| Liberal Democrats | Andrew Goss | 0,000 | 00.0% | +0.0 |
| Labour | Brian Summerson | 0,000 | 00.0% | +0.0 |
| Majority | | | | |
| Turnout | | 0,000 | 00.0% | |
| gain from | | Swing | | |
