= 2011 Harrogate Borough Council election =

2011 UK local government election

Results of the 2011 Harrogate Borough Council election

The 2011 Harrogate Borough Council election was held on Thursday 5 May 2011 to elect 20 members to Harrogate Borough Council, the same day as other local elections in the United Kingdom. It elected approximately one-third of council's 54 members to a four-year term. It was preceded by the 2010 election and followed by the 2012 election. The Conservative Party held control of the council after the election. Turnout across the wards up for election was 45.0%.

== Results summary ==
2011 Harrogate Borough Council
Party	This election			Full council			This election		
Party	Seats	Net	Seats %	Other	Total	Total %	Votes	Votes %	+/−
Conservative	14	▲7	70.0	20	34	63.0			
Liberal Democrats	5	▼5	25.0	12	17	31.5			
Independent	1	▼2	5.0	2	3	5.6			
Labour	0	Steady	0.0	0	0	0.0			
UKIP	0	Steady	0.0	0	0	0.0			

== Ward results ==
=== Bilton ===
Bilton
Party	Candidate	Votes	%	±%
Conservative	Alex Brown	976	45.3	▲0.9
Liberal Democrats	Andrew Kempston-Parkes	801	37.2	▼12.2
Labour	Andrew Gray	376	17.5	New
Majority		175	8.1	N/A
Total valid votes		2,153	99.8	
Rejected ballots		5	0.2	
Turnout		2,158	50.0	
Registered electors		4,317		
Conservative gain from Liberal Democrats		Swing	▲6.5	

=== Granby ===
Granby
Party	Candidate	Votes	%	±%
Liberal Democrats	Jennifer Travena	743	44.7	▼21.4
Conservative	Stephen Marshall	564	33.9	▲12.7
Labour	Diane Maguire	357	21.5	▲16.0
Majority		179	10.8	▼34.1
Total valid votes		1,664	98.8	
Rejected ballots		21	1.2	
Turnout		1,685	36.9	
Registered electors		4,564		
Liberal Democrats hold		Swing	▼17.0	

=== Harlow Moor ===
Harlow Moor
Party	Candidate	Votes	%	±%
Conservative	Simon Theakston*	1,320	64.4	▲2.4
Liberal Democrats	Howard Cohen	450	22.0	▼11.3
Labour	Kevin McNerney	280	13.7	▲8.9
Majority		870	42.4	▲13.7
Total valid votes		2,050	99.5	
Rejected ballots		10	0.5	
Turnout		2,060	49.9	
Registered electors		4,126		
Conservative hold		Swing	▲6.9	

=== High Harrogate ===
High Harrogate
Party	Candidate	Votes	%	±%
Conservative	Eric Cooper	1,003	55.6	▲1.6
Liberal Democrats	Valerie Rodgers	519	28.8	▼5.8
Labour	Christopher Watt	283	15.7	▲11.1
Majority		484	26.8	▲7.4
Total valid votes		1,805	99.0	
Rejected ballots		19	1.0	
Turnout		1,824	41.2	
Registered electors		4,422		
Conservative hold		Swing	▲3.7	

=== Hookstone ===
Hookstone
Party	Candidate	Votes	%	±%
Liberal Democrats	Reginald Marsh*	1,153	54.4	▼11.0
Conservative	Philip Carlyle	708	33.4	▲8.0
Labour	Patricia Foxall	257	12.1	▲9.0
Majority		445	21.0	▼19.0
Total valid votes		2,118	99.3	
Rejected ballots		14	0.7	
Turnout		2,132	47.6	
Registered electors		4,476		
Liberal Democrats hold		Swing	▼9.5	

=== Knaresborough East ===
Knaresborough East
Party	Candidate	Votes	%	±%
Conservative	Barrington Batt	586	34.6	▲10.6
Liberal Democrats	Keith Rothwell*	437	25.8	▼19.3
Independent	Andrew Wright	382	22.5	▲2.9
Labour	Althea Farmer	291	17.2	▲10.4
Majority		149	8.8	N/A
Total valid votes		1,696	99.4	
Rejected ballots		11	0.6	
Turnout		1,707	43.1	
Registered electors		3,960		
Conservative gain from Liberal Democrats		Swing	▲15.0	

=== Knaresborough King James ===
Knaresborough King James
Party	Candidate	Votes	%	±%
Conservative	Philip Ireland	985	51.3	▲12.8
Liberal Democrats	Richard Hall	612	31.9	▼23.6
Labour	Lorraine Ferris	322	16.8	New
Majority		373	19.4	N/A
Total valid votes		1,919	98.7	
Rejected ballots		26	1.3	
Turnout		1,945	48.3	
Registered electors		4,030		
Conservative gain from Liberal Democrats		Swing	▲18.2	

=== Knaresborough Scriven Park ===
Knaresborough Scriven Park
Party	Candidate	Votes	%	±%
Conservative	Ivor Fox	1,032	56.2	▲21.0
Liberal Democrats	Robert Archibald	429	23.4	▼29.1
Labour	Janet Williams	374	20.4	▲13.6
Majority		603	32.9	N/A
Total valid votes		1,835	98.9	
Rejected ballots		21	1.1	
Turnout		1,856	44.5	
Registered electors		4,174		
Conservative gain from Liberal Democrats		Swing	▲25.1	

=== Low Harrogate ===
Low Harrogate
Party	Candidate	Votes	%	±%
Conservative	Jean Butterfield*	987	54.8	▲0.5
Liberal Democrats	Carol Brooks	529	29.4	▼16.3
Labour	Robert Darlington	182	10.1	New
UKIP	Hugh Whiteside	104	5.8	New
Majority		458	25.4	▲16.8
Total valid votes		1,802	99.3	
Rejected ballots		12	0.7	
Turnout		1,814	42.4	
Registered electors		4,276		
Conservative hold		Swing	▲8.4	

=== New Park ===
New Park
Party	Candidate	Votes	%	±%
Liberal Democrats	Trevor Chapman*	817	50.8	▼24.5
Conservative	Adam Taylor	438	27.2	▲12.5
Labour	Anthony Pedel	252	15.7	New
Independent	Philip Reynolds	101	6.3	New
Majority		379	23.6	▼37.0
Total valid votes		1,608	98.7	
Rejected ballots		21	1.3	
Turnout		1,629	39.5	
Registered electors		4,124		
Liberal Democrats hold		Swing	▼18.5	

=== Pannal ===
Pannal
Party	Candidate	Votes	%	±%
Conservative	Matthew Hill	1,290	52.1	▼14.2
Liberal Democrats	Martin Eglese	487	19.7	▼14.1
Independent	Michael Gardner* (Note: Michael Gardner was elected as the candidate for the Conservatives in 2007, but ran for reelection as an independent.)	450	18.2	New
Labour	Helen Burke	249	10.1	New
Majority		803	32.4	▼0.1
Total valid votes		2,476	99.6	
Rejected ballots		10	0.4	
Turnout		2,486	57.0	
Registered electors		4,361		
Conservative hold		Swing	Steady	

=== Ripon Minster ===
Ripon Minster
Party	Candidate	Votes	%	±%
Conservative	George Pickles	645	39.0	▲24.6
Independent	Sidney Hawke*	641	38.8	▼8.5
Liberal Democrats	Paul Freeman	236	14.3	▼3.1
Labour	Deborah Welford	131	7.9	New
Majority		4	0.2	N/A
Total valid votes		1,653	99.1	
Rejected ballots		15	0.9	
Turnout		1,668	41.3	
Registered electors		4,037		
Conservative gain from Independent		Swing	▲16.5	

=== Ripon Moorside ===
Ripon Moorside
Party	Candidate	Votes	%	±%
Independent	Charles Powell*	889	58.1	▼3.3
Conservative	John Topping	381	24.9	▲11.2
Labour	Nicolas Murray	259	16.9	New
Majority		508	33.2	▼11.1
Total valid votes		1,529	97.6	
Rejected ballots		37	2.4	
Turnout		1,566	40.3	
Registered electors		3,890		
Independent hold		Swing	▼7.2	

=== Ripon Spa ===
Ripon Spa
Party	Candidate	Votes	%	±%
Conservative	Michael Chambers	843	45.6	▲22.5
Independent	Peter Horton*	473	25.6	▼14.4
Liberal Democrats	John Stockdale	237	12.8	▼16.3
Labour	Andrew Murday	152	8.2	New
Independent	Stanley Mackintosh	144	7.8	New
Majority		370	20.0	N/A
Total valid votes		1,849	99.1	
Rejected ballots		17	0.9	
Turnout		1,866	43.0	
Registered electors		4,338		
Conservative gain from Independent		Swing	▲18.4	

=== Rossett ===
Rossett (2 seats)
Party	Candidate	Votes	%	±%
Conservative	James Clark*	1,762		
Conservative	Michelle Woolley	1,412		
Liberal Democrats	Leslie Parkes	654		
Liberal Democrats	James P. Clarke	611		
Labour	Alan Sweeney	310		
Total valid votes				
Rejected ballots				
Turnout		2,636	54.7	
Registered electors		4,820		
Conservative hold				
Conservative hold				

=== Saltergate ===
Saltergate
Party	Candidate	Votes	%	±%
Conservative	Steven Jackson	885	50.4	▲16.4
Liberal Democrats	Geoffrey Webber*	577	32.9	▼22.9
Labour	Janet Morrow	294	16.7	New
Majority		308	17.5	N/A
Total valid votes		1,756	98.9	
Rejected ballots		19	1.1	
Turnout		1,775	42.4	
Registered electors		4,186		
Conservative gain from Liberal Democrats		Swing	▲19.6	

=== Starbeck ===
Starbeck
Party	Candidate	Votes	%	±%
Liberal Democrats	Janet Law	814	47.8	▼24.3
Conservative	John Fletcher	389	22.9	▲9.8
Labour	Geoffrey Foxall	272	16.0	▲10.9
Independent	David Rimington	227	13.3	New
Majority		425	25.0	▼34.2
Total valid votes		1,702	98.6	
Rejected ballots		24	1.4	
Turnout		1,726	38.0	
Registered electors		4,540		
Liberal Democrats hold		Swing	▼17.1	

=== Stray ===
Stray
Party	Candidate	Votes	%	±%
Conservative	Patricia Jones*	1,324	55.6	▲1.1
Liberal Democrats	Keith Barnes	614	27.7	▼15.1
Labour	Stuart Hubbert	280	12.6	New
Majority		710	32.0	▲20.2
Total valid votes		2,218	99.0	
Rejected ballots		22	1.0	
Turnout		2,240	53.0	
Registered electors		4,230		
Conservative hold		Swing	▲8.1	

=== Woodfield ===
Woodfield
Party	Candidate	Votes	%	±%
Liberal Democrats	Greta Knight (Note: Greta Knight was elected in a 7 January 2010 by-election following the death of incumbent Liberal Democrat councillor John Wren.)	764	45.4	▼13.2
Labour	Daniel Maguire	530	31.5	▲17.3
Conservative	Rebecca Burnett	390	23.2	▲8.3
Majority		234	13.9	▼29.8
Total valid votes		1,684	99.0	
Rejected ballots		17	1.0	
Turnout		1,701	41.4	
Registered electors		4,109		
Liberal Democrats hold		Swing	▼15.2	
