= 2004 Harrogate Borough Council election =

2004 UK local government election

Map of the results

The 2004 Harrogate Council election took place on 10 June 2004 to elect members of Harrogate Borough Council in North Yorkshire, England. One third of the council was up for election and the Conservative Party stayed in overall control of the council.

After the election, the composition of the council was:

- Conservative 29
- Liberal Democrat 21
- Independent 4

== Campaign ==
Before the election the Conservatives ran the council with 28 seats, while the Liberal Democrats had 21 seats and there were 4 independents. The Conservatives had gained a majority after 2 Liberal Democrats defected to the Conservatives in autumn 2003. 16 seats were contested in the election, all from the rural areas of the council. The candidates in the election were 16 Conservatives, 16 Liberal Democrats, 2 independents and 1 candidate from the British National Party. The election was held under all postal voting, for the first time in Harrogate.

A significant issue in the election was the future of the Royal Hall in Harrogate. The Conservative administration refused to fund the restoration of the building and said they would consider financing other projects elsewhere in the council area from the money saved. However the Liberal Democrats would have put 2.6 million pounds towards restoring it, as they said future generations would have to spend even more if the council did not take action.

== Election result ==
The results saw the Conservatives stay in control, with no change in the party composition of the council. The Conservatives gained Lower Nidderdale from the Liberal Democrats, but Conservative cabinet member Brian Lumsden was defeated in Boroughbridge by Liberal Democrat Peter Phillips, in what had been considered a safe seat. The Conservatives won 62.5% of the vote, compared to 34.2% for the Liberal Democrats. As a result, the Conservatives remained on 29 seats, the Liberal Democrats on 21 and 4 independents.

Meanwhile, the British National Party came in last in the only seat they contested in Nidd Valley with 131 votes, with Leslie Ellington holding the seat for the Conservatives, after having defected from the Liberal Democrats since the 2003 election. Overall turnout in the election was 55.2%, an increase on the 34.7% in the 2003 election and the 38.7% at the 2002 election.

Harrogate local election result 2004
Party	Seats	Gains	Losses	Net gain/loss	Seats %	Votes %	Votes	+/−
Conservative	13	1	1	0	81.3	62.5	12,168	+17.8%
Liberal Democrats	3	1	1	0	18.8	34.2	6,661	-12.3%
Independent	0	0	0	0	0	2.5	495	-1.5%
BNP	0	0	0	0	0	0.7	131	+0.7%

== Ward results ==
Bishop Monkton
Party	Candidate	Votes	%	±%
Conservative	Ian Galloway	782	70.9	+16.2
Liberal Democrats	Sarah-Jane Smith	321	29.1	−16.2
Majority		461	41.8	+32.4
Turnout		1,103	53.0	+3.7
Conservative hold		Swing		

Boroughbridge
Party	Candidate	Votes	%	±%
Liberal Democrats	Peter Phillips	592	54.2	+19.0
Conservative	Brian Lumsden	501	45.8	−10.4
Majority		91	8.3	
Turnout		1,093	48.9	+19.3
Liberal Democrats gain from Conservative		Swing		

Claro
Party	Candidate	Votes	%	±%
Conservative	William Alton	858	67.3	−2.0
Liberal Democrats	Helen Lyon	417	32.7	+2.0
Majority		441	34.6	−4.0
Turnout		1,275	52.9	+6.9
Conservative hold		Swing		

Killinghall
Party	Candidate	Votes	%	±%
Conservative	Michael Harrison	875	74.9	+1.2
Liberal Democrats	Pauline Watson	293	25.1	−1.2
Majority		582	49.8	+2.4
Turnout		1,168	52.5	+8.2
Conservative hold		Swing		

Kirkby Malzeard
Party	Candidate	Votes	%	±%
Conservative	Margaret Atkinson	809	67.8	−1.5
Liberal Democrats	John Stockdale	384	32.2	+1.5
Majority		425	35.6	−2.9
Turnout		1,193	54.7	+7.5
Conservative hold		Swing		

Lower Nidderdale
Party	Candidate	Votes	%	±%
Conservative	Elwyn Hinchcliffe	771	51.7	+2.1
Liberal Democrats	Thomas Watson	721	48.3	−2.1
Majority		50	3.4	
Turnout		1,492	64.4	+9.4
Conservative gain from Liberal Democrats		Swing		

Marston Moor
Party	Candidate	Votes	%	±%
Conservative	Julian Sturdy	936	78.1	+24.6
Liberal Democrats	Richard Hall	262	21.9	−16.7
Majority		674	56.3	+41.3
Turnout		1,198	55.9	+12.4
Conservative hold		Swing		

Mashamshire
Party	Candidate	Votes	%	±%
Conservative	Nigel Simms	602	57.9	−13.9
Independent	Thomas Mould	259	24.9	+24.9
Liberal Democrats	Bernard Bateman	179	17.2	−11.0
Majority		343	33.0	−10.6
Turnout		1,040	55.8	+16.0
Conservative hold		Swing		

Newby
Party	Candidate	Votes	%	±%
Conservative	Nicholas Wilson	689	58.9	−3.8
Liberal Democrats	Stephen Jones	481	41.1	+3.8
Majority		208	17.8	−7.5
Turnout		1,170	50.4	+17.2
Conservative hold		Swing		

Nidd Valley
Party	Candidate	Votes	%	±%
Conservative	Leslie Ellington	748	57.9	+22.8
Liberal Democrats	Patricia Hutchinson	412	31.9	−33.0
BNP	Colin Banner	131	10.1	+10.1
Majority		336	26.0	
Turnout		1,291	63.5	+16.8
Conservative hold		Swing		

Ouseburn
Party	Candidate	Votes	%	±%
Liberal Democrats	Christine Lewis	743	53.8	−11.1
Conservative	John Savage	637	46.2	+11.1
Majority		106	7.7	−22.2
Turnout		1,380	61.1	+11.0
Liberal Democrats hold		Swing		

Pateley Bridge
Party	Candidate	Votes	%	±%
Liberal Democrats	Stanley Beer	615	51.8	−36.2
Conservative	Richard Beecroft	572	48.2	+48.2
Majority		43	3.6	−72.4
Turnout		1,187	58.3	+20.6
Liberal Democrats hold		Swing		

Ribston
Party	Candidate	Votes	%	±%
Conservative	Caroline Bayliss	822	68.1	−3.3
Liberal Democrats	Christine Willoughby	385	31.9	+3.3
Majority		437	36.2	−6.5
Turnout		1,207	53.2	+16.1
Conservative hold		Swing		

Spofforth with Lower Wharfedale
Party	Candidate	Votes	%	±%
Conservative	Shirley Fawcett	869	64.2	−11.1
Liberal Democrats	Jayne Jackson	249	18.4	−6.3
Independent	David Rimington	236	17.4	+17.4
Majority		620	45.8	−4.9
Turnout		1,354	57.3	+15.0
Conservative hold		Swing		

Washburn
Party	Candidate	Votes	%	±%
Conservative	Richard Grange	963	73.6	−7.8
Liberal Democrats	Jonathan Fox	346	26.4	+7.8
Majority		617	47.1	−15.7
Turnout		1,309	59.8	+17.3
Conservative hold		Swing		

Wathvale
Party	Candidate	Votes	%	±%
Conservative	Christopher Brown	734	73.8	
Liberal Democrats	John Walton	261	26.2	
Majority		473	47.5	
Turnout		995	46.2	
Conservative hold		Swing		
