= 2008 Harrogate Borough Council election =

2008 UK local government election

Map of the results

The 2008 Harrogate Council election took place on 1 May 2008 to elect members of Harrogate Borough Council in North Yorkshire, England. One third of the council was up for election and the council stayed under no overall control.

After the election, the composition of the council was

- Conservative 27
- Liberal Democrat 21
- Independent 6

== Campaign ==
Before the election the Conservatives held 24 of the 54 seats, the Liberal Democrats 23 and independents 6. A further seat in Lower Nidderdale was vacant after the death of Conservative councillor Elwyn Hinchcliffe.

16 seats were contested in the election, all from the rural areas of the council, with the Conservatives the party defending in 13 seats and the Liberal Democrats in 3. 2 incumbent councillors stood down at the election, Nick Wilson from Newby ward and Chris Lewis from Ouseburn ward. The Conservatives contested all 16 seats, the Liberal Democrats 15, British National Party 6, Labour 5, United Kingdom Independence Party 3 and 1 independent.

Issues in the election included a possible recycling plant near Boroughbridge and the storage site for toxic chemicals in Melmerby, as well as the issues of transport, affordable housing and the council tax.

== Election result ==
The results saw the Conservatives gain 2 seats from the Liberal Democrats to hold 27 seats, exactly half of the council. The Conservatives gained Boroughbridge and Ouseburn wards, by 161 and 731 votes respectively, to reduce the Liberal Democrats to 21 seats. The only seat held by the Liberal Democrats was in Pateley Bridge by 77 votes, but they came 34 votes short of taking Lower Nidderdale and 37 votes from taking Claro. No other party won any seats in the election, while 6 independent councillors remained on the council, after none of them had been defending seats in the election. Overall turnout in the election was 48%, the highest in a decade apart from the all postal voting election in 2004.

Harrogate local election result 2008
Party	Seats	Gains	Losses	Net gain/loss	Seats %	Votes %	Votes	+/−
Conservative	15	2	0	+2	93.8	65.8	11,590	+27.8%
Liberal Democrats	1	0	2	-2	6.3	27.0	4,749	-18.9%
Independent	0	0	0	0	0	3.0	537	-5.1%
BNP	0	0	0	0	0	2.0	353	-2.3%
Labour	0	0	0	0	0	1.5	258	-1.8%
UKIP	0	0	0	0	0	0.7	132	+0.3%

== Ward results ==
Bishop Monkton
Party	Candidate	Votes	%	±%
Conservative	Ian Galloway	675	68.4	−2.5
Liberal Democrats	Steve Barlow	312	31.6	+2.5
Majority		363	36.8	−5.0
Turnout		987	45.0	−8.0
Conservative hold		Swing		

Boroughbridge
Party	Candidate	Votes	%	±%
Conservative	Robert Windass	660	55.6	+9.8
Liberal Democrats	Peter Phillips	499	42.0	−12.2
Labour	Pat Foxall	28	2.4	+2.4
Majority		161	13.6	
Turnout		1,187	50.7	+1.8
Conservative gain from Liberal Democrats		Swing		

Claro
Party	Candidate	Votes	%	±%
Conservative	Anthony Alton	713	50.4	−16.9
Liberal Democrats	Malcolm Howe	676	47.8	+15.1
Labour	Geoff Foxall	26	1.8	+1.8
Majority		37	2.6	−32.0
Turnout		1,415	56.6	+3.7
Conservative hold		Swing		

Killinghall
Party	Candidate	Votes	%	±%
Conservative	Michael Harrison	823	77.7	+2.8
Liberal Democrats	Paul Butters	173	16.3	−8.8
UKIP	Jennifer Hunter	32	3.0	+3.0
Labour	Andrew Gray	31	2.9	+2.9
Majority		650	61.4	+11.6
Turnout		1,059	45.1	−7.4
Conservative hold		Swing		

Kirkby Malzeard
Party	Candidate	Votes	%	±%
Conservative	Margaret Atkinson	765	73.3	+5.5
Liberal Democrats	Albert Weidemann	210	20.1	−12.1
BNP	Ashley Banner	68	6.5	+6.5
Majority		555	53.2	+17.6
Turnout		1,043	44.8	−9.9
Conservative hold		Swing		

Lower Nidderdale
Party	Candidate	Votes	%	±%
Conservative	Christine Hill	648	49.7	−2.0
Liberal Democrats	Tom Watson	614	47.0	−1.3
BNP	James Thackray	43	3.3	+3.3
Majority		34	2.6	−0.8
Turnout		1,305	53.9	−10.5
Conservative hold		Swing		

Marston Moor
Party	Candidate	Votes	%	±%
Conservative	John Savage	663	53.6	−12.3
Independent	Norman Waller	537	43.4	+43.4
BNP	Sam Clayton	36	2.9	+2.9
Majority		126	10.2	−21.6
Turnout		1,236	56.1	+12.3
Conservative hold		Swing		

Mashamshire
Party	Candidate	Votes	%	±%
Conservative	Nigel Simms	594	76.4	+18.5
Liberal Democrats	John Stockdale	183	23.6	+6.4
Majority		411	52.9	+19.9
Turnout		777	39.8	−16.0
Conservative hold		Swing		

Newby
Party	Candidate	Votes	%	±%
Conservative	Nick Brown	621	61.5	+2.6
Liberal Democrats	Steve Jones	388	38.5	−2.6
Majority		233	23.1	+5.3
Turnout		1,009	42.2	−8.2
Conservative hold		Swing		

Nidd Valley
Party	Candidate	Votes	%	±%
Conservative	Les Ellington	829	74.9	+27.0
Liberal Democrats	Howard Cohen	177	16.0	−15.9
BNP	Colin Banner	72	6.5	−3.6
UKIP	John Upex	29	2.6	+2.6
Majority		652	58.9	+32.9
Turnout		1,107	52.2	−11.3
Conservative hold		Swing		

Ouseburn
Party	Candidate	Votes	%	±%
Conservative	Martin Leather	865	77.1	+30.9
Liberal Democrats	Clare McKenzie	134	11.9	−41.9
Labour	John Fisher	123	11.0	+11.0
Majority		731	65.2	
Turnout		1,122	48.0	−13.1
Conservative gain from Liberal Democrats		Swing		

Pateley Bridge
Party	Candidate	Votes	%	±%
Liberal Democrats	Stan Beer	544	51.5	−0.3
Conservative	Kathy Sewell	467	44.2	−4.0
BNP	Joel Banner	46	4.4	+4.4
Majority		77	7.3	+3.7
Turnout		1,057	53.7	−4.6
Liberal Democrats hold		Swing		

Ribston
Party	Candidate	Votes	%	±%
Conservative	Caroline Bayliss	742	75.0	+6.9
Liberal Democrats	David Tankard	176	17.8	−14.1
UKIP	Timothy Hunter	71	7.2	+7.2
Majority		566	57.2	+21.0
Turnout		989	41.6	−11.6
Conservative hold		Swing		

Spofforth with Lower Wharfedale
Party	Candidate	Votes	%	±%
Conservative	Shirley Fawcett	804	75.6	+11.4
Liberal Democrats	Matthew Webber	121	11.4	−7.0
BNP	Michelle Shrubb	88	8.3	+8.3
Labour	Richard Wilson	50	4.7	+4.7
Majority		683	64.3	+18.5
Turnout		1,063	43.4	−13.9
Conservative hold		Swing		

Washburn
Party	Candidate	Votes	%	±%
Conservative	Richard Grange	957	79.5	+5.9
Liberal Democrats	Nick Anderson	247	20.5	−5.9
Majority		710	59.0	+11.9
Turnout		1,204	48.5	−11.3
Conservative hold		Swing		

Wathvale
Party	Candidate	Votes	%	±%
Conservative	Chris Brown	764	72.1	−1.7
Liberal Democrats	Bernard Bateman	295	27.9	+1.7
Majority		469	44.3	−3.2
Turnout		1,059	46.3	+0.1
Conservative hold		Swing		
