= David Simpson (mayor) =

English builder and politician (1860–1931)

David Simpson JP
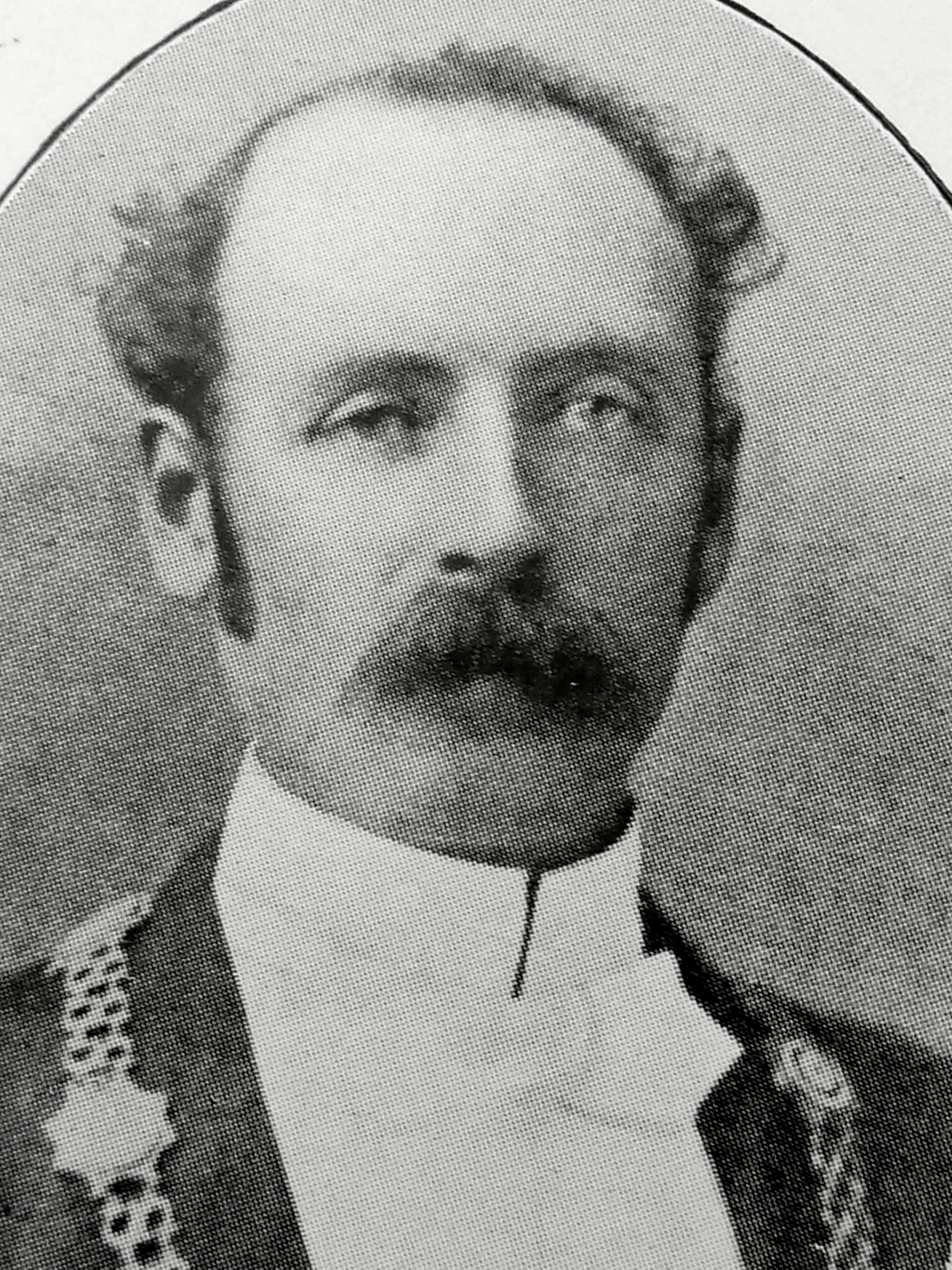
- Born: 5 January 1860; Harrogate, West Riding of Yorkshire, England
- Died: 15 January 1931 (aged 71); Harrogate, West Riding of Yorkshire, England
- Burial place: Grove Road Cemetery, Harrogate
- Occupations: Builder; contractor; property developer
- Years active: 1881–1931
- Notable work: Oakdale Manor (builder)

David Simpson JP (5 January 1860 – 15 January 1931) was an English builder, politician, property developer and contractor who was four times mayor of Harrogate, and three times deputy mayor. He developed the whole of the Duchy Estate, a major residential quarter for the rich, more than doubling the rateable value of the town in the first quarter of the 20th century. He was a member of Harrogate Borough Council for 34 years, making him the "father" of the council by the end of his career there. He was a justice of the peace and the first honorary Freeman of the Borough of Harrogate. He was president of the Bilton Ward Conservatives, a member of the Knaresborough Board of Guardians and an alderman of West Riding County Council. He built himself a large, castellated mansion called Oakdale, in 1903, besides the even larger Grand Hotel (now called Windsor House) in Harrogate in the same year..

In spite of his "spectacular success" as a developer, Simpson suffered a financial embarrassment, known as his crash, a few years before the First World War, and lost possession of Oakdale, Although he compounded the situation by going on a sea voyage to New York City and leaving his son to deal with his catastrophe, he retained business confidence, remained a member of the council, and was made freeman in 1923.

Simpson was part of a building dynasty in that he was the son of builder David Simpson, a previous mayor of Harrogate, and the father of Clarence Simpson who also trained in the business. He was a Freemason, and was president of Oakdale Golf club, Harrogate's Cricket and Athletic club and the Old Boys' Rugby Football Club. Two of his sons were killed in action at the Somme during the First World War.

== Background ==
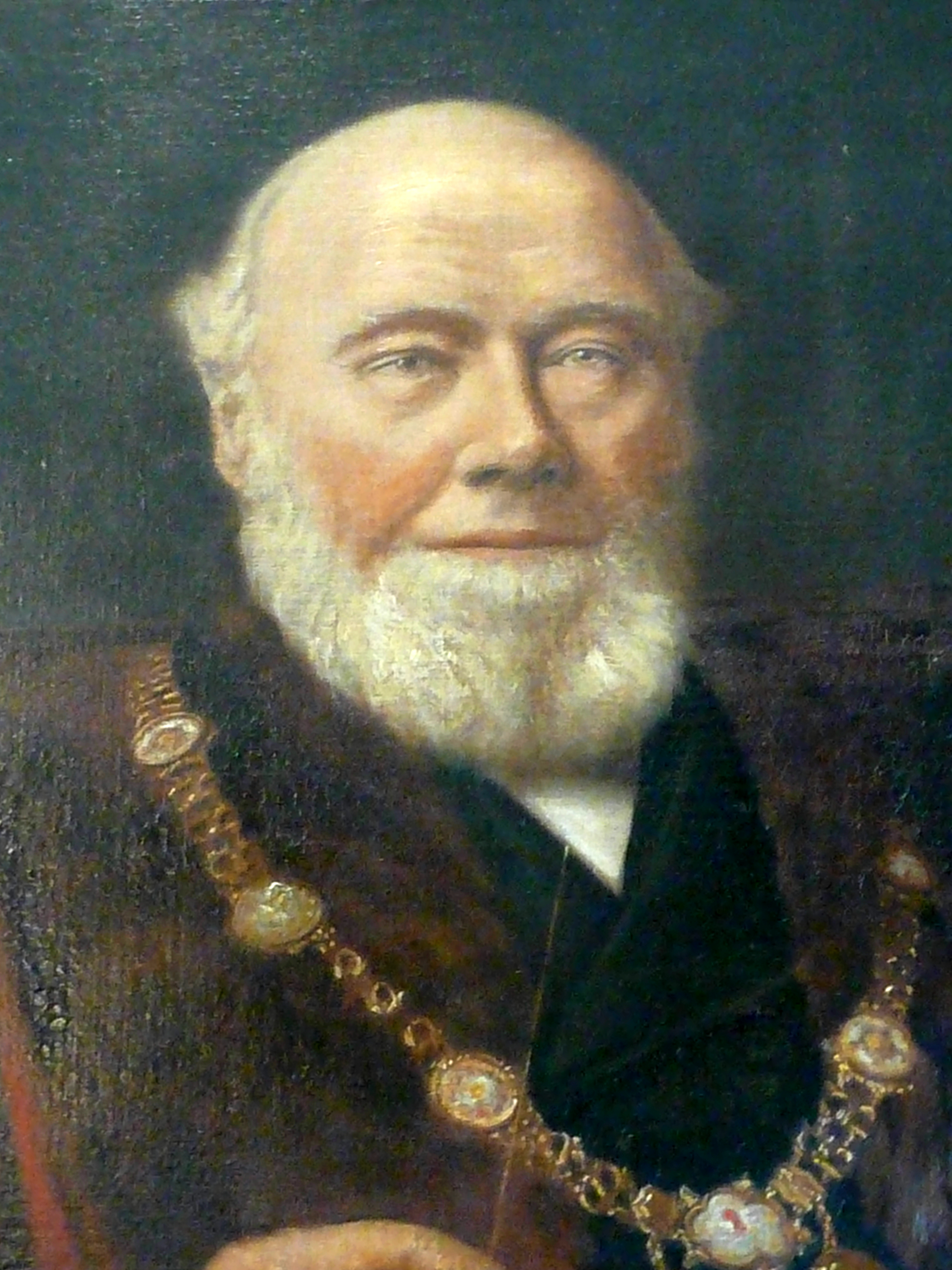
Simpson's father, Alderman James Simpson

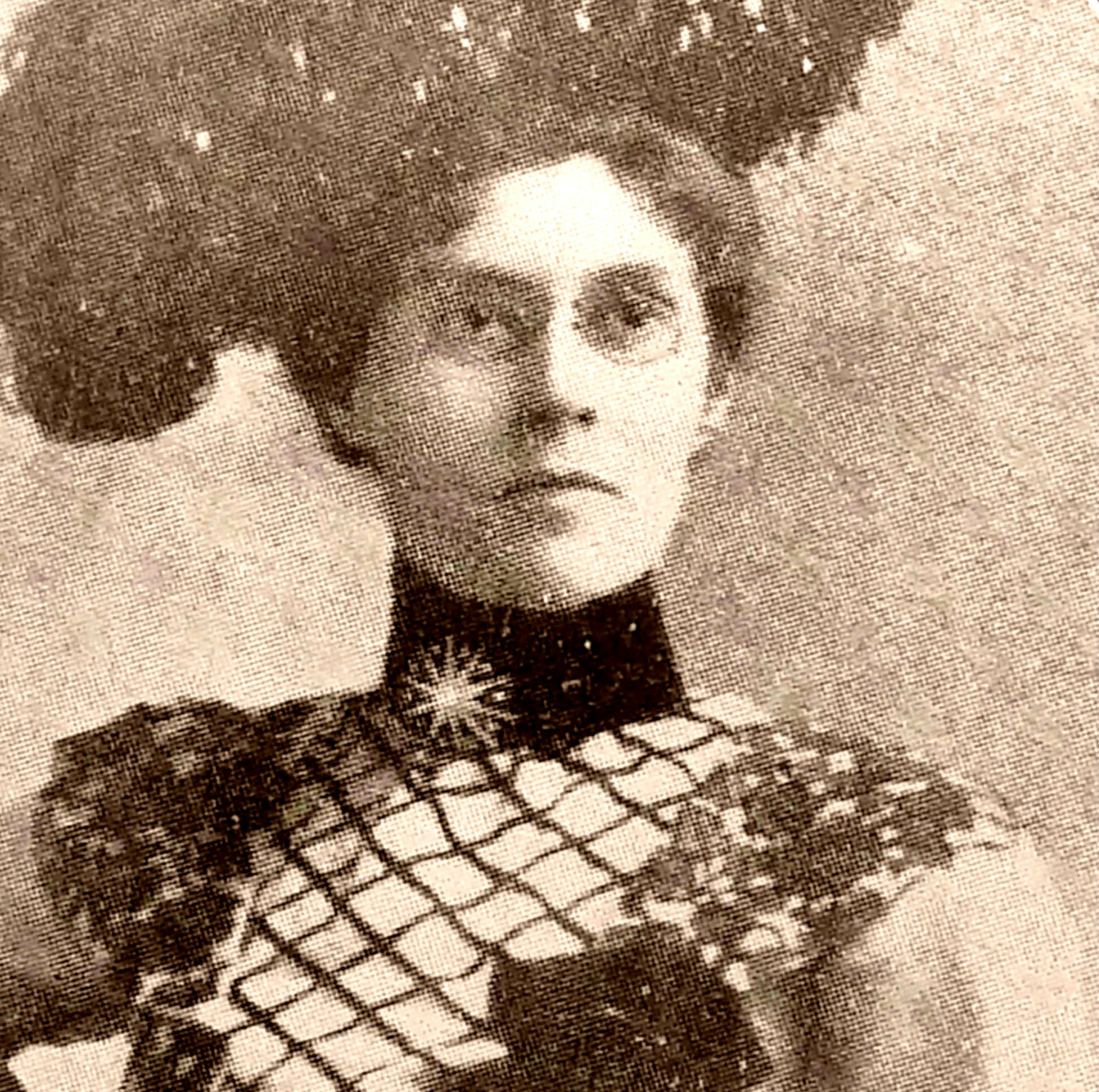
Hannah Jackson Simpson, in 1902

Simpson was born into the family building business, and joined the trade. His son Clarence was apprenticed to the trade, too. Simpson was born on 5 January 1860 in John Street, Harrogate, North Riding of Yorkshire, (Note: GRO index: Births Mar 1860 Simpson David Knaresbro 9a 104. The original birth certificate says: born: fifth January 1860 at John Street, Harrogate. Name: David. Sex: boy. Father: James Simpson. Mother: Ellen Simpson, formerly Robinson. Father's occupation: stonemason (master). Informant: Ellen Simpson, mother, John Street Harrogate.) and baptised at Christ Church, High Harrogate on 12 February 1860. He was the eldest of the seven children of Alderman James Simpson (1824–1895), a master mason and builder, and Ellen Simpson née Robinson (1828 – 6 December 1885), who was born in Burniston. On 7 April 1861 the family address was 4 Royal Parade, Harrogate, and David Simpson, at 15 months old, was living with his parents. In 1871 Simpson was a scholar, living with his parents and siblings at 8 Parliament Terrace, Harrogate. By 1881, Simpson was a stonemason, and still at 8 Parliament Street with his parents and siblings. As an adult, he was 5 feet 11 inches (1.80 m), and had blue eyes and a fresh complexion.

On 8 June 1886 at St Mary's Church, Harrogate, Simpson married Hannah Jackson Holmes (23 November 1865 – 1 July 1939), who was born in Hull, the daughter of joiner George Holmes (born c.1827) of Bradford. (Note: GRO index: Births Mar 1866 Holmes Hannah J. Hull 9d 194. Marriages Jun 1886 Holmes Hannah Jackson and Simpson David, Knaresborough 9a 151. Deaths Sep 1939 Simpson Hannah J 73 Knaresbro' 9a 161. Hannah and David Simpson's dates are inscribed on their gravestone) They had three sons, two of whom died in the First World War. The eldest son, 2nd Lieutenant James Marsden "Jim" Simpson (1888 – 9 May 1916). (Note: GRO index: Births Mar 1888 Simpson James Marsden Knaresbro' 9a 113) of the Huddersfield Rifles and Royal Engineers was in peacetime an engineer working on the Canadian Northern Railway and for Harrogate Borough Council, and a Yorkshire Rugby forward. He was shot in the head by a sniper, near Vimy. The second son, Lieutenant George Simpson (1892 – 23 August 1918), (Note: GRO index: Births Sep 1892 Simpson George Knaresbro' 9a 105) of the Australian Infantry (AIF), and a farmer in peacetime, was also killed in action at the Somme. Simpson's surviving Harrogate-born son was Clarence "Jack" Simpson (18 May 1894 – 5 May 1973), a building apprentice, then a wool merchant. (Note: GRO index: Births Jun 1894 Simpson Clarence Knaresbro' 9a 107. Deaths Jun 1973 Simpson Clanrence Jack 18 MY 1894 Claro 2C 267.)

In 1891, Simpson was describing himself as a builder and contractor, and was living with his wife, son James, and father-in-law George Holmes at 4 St Mary's Walk. By 1911, Simpson, his wife and son, and four servants were living at Oakdale, Killinghall. (Note: Oakdale is now known as Oakdale House, Penny Pot Lane, Killinghall near Harrogate.) On 19 June 1921 the Census finds him as a summer visitor to the Isle of Man. He is 61 years old, but listed as a contractor, that is, not yet retired.

== Career ==
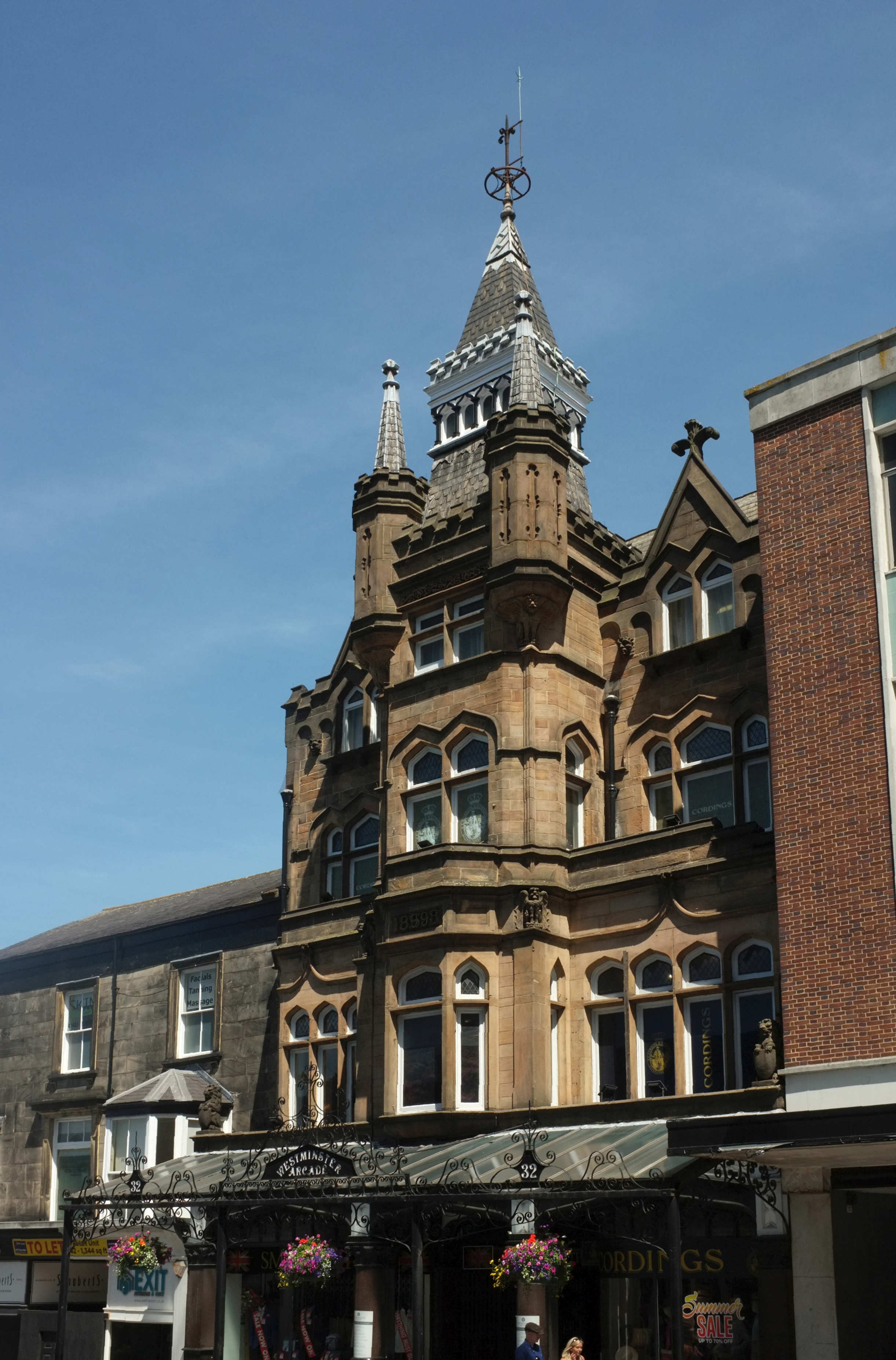
Royal Arcade, built by Simpson in 1898

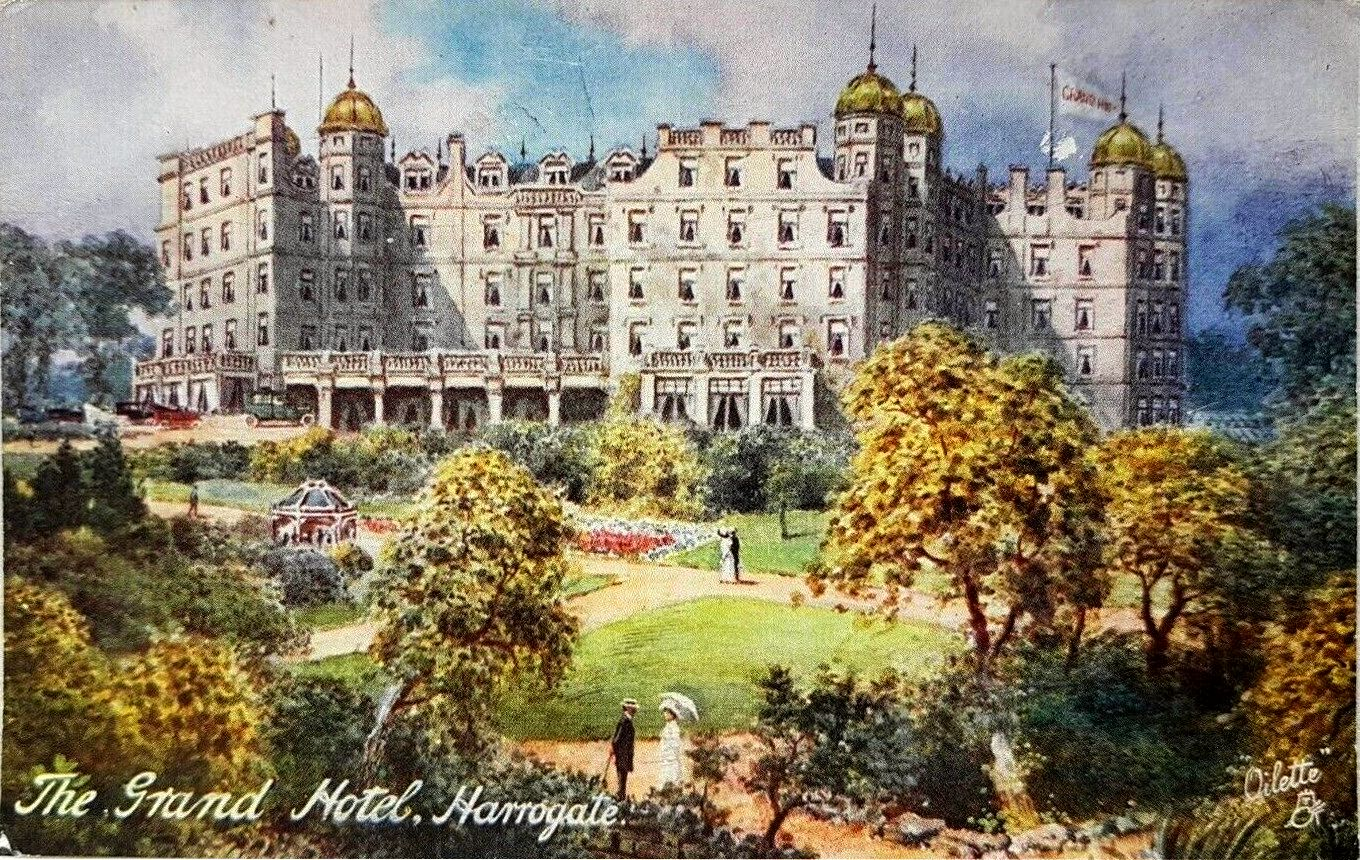
Grand Hotel, before 1914

Simplson was a builder, contractor, and property developer, describing himself as a "builder and contractor in all branches of the building trade". His buildings were often designed by Whitehead and Smetham. He followed his father into the business, and by 1911 his son Clarence was an apprentice builder. "He was responsible for the erection of some the town's most beautiful residences, and developed almost the whole of the Duchy Estate". The Yorkshire Post & Leeds Intelligencer said:

Alderman Simpson was sometimes described as the maker of modern Harrogate. His development of the Duchy Estate, the chief residential quarter, accounted for a considerable portion of the increase in the rateable value of Harrogate from £200,000 (equivalent to £27,425,910 in 2023) to £420,000 (equivalent to £30,257,562 in 2023) between 1901 and 1925. He always aimed at dignity and variety, and the preservation of amenities, holding that it was these features in development which gave character and distinction to a town.

Simpson built many residences on many Harrogate estates, besides his mansion Oakdale, and the large villa Waldernheath, but one of his more elaborate buildings was the "splendidly Gothic" Royal Arcade of 1898 designed by Whitehead and Smetham, on Parliament Street (now known as the Westminster Arcade). "It was rumoured that the exuberant carvings and spires on the main façade were included to provide employment for masons who would otherwise have been affected adversely by the current building recession". He built himself another house, Four Ash, on Clarence Drive, but that was eventually overlooked by the Grand Hotel (now called Windsor House), which Simpson also built.

=== Crash ===
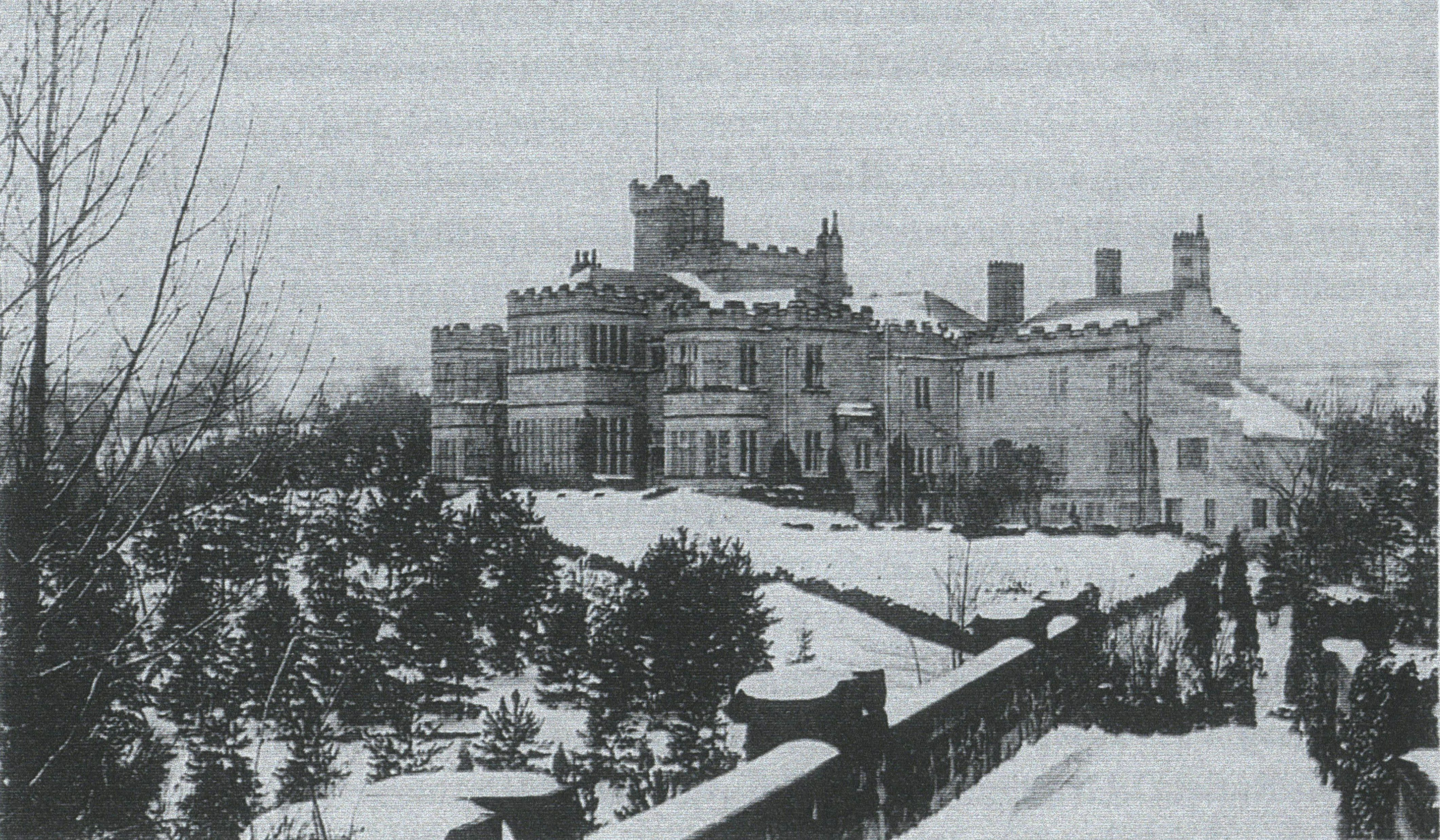
Oakdale, Simpson's 1903 mansion, which he lost after his crash

Simpson was respected in Harrogate as a businessman who had achieved "spectacular success", but he suffered a major financial embarrassment due to unfortunate investments between 1909 and 1911, This was not spoken of by his contemporary admirers, but was nevertheless known as his crash. It affected his large, castellated, residential mansion Oakdale, but not his investments in, or developments on, the estate of the Duchy of Lancaster.

An early indication of Simpson's crash was the refusal by Coutts bank of a rental cheque issued on Simpson's behalf in 1908 by his son James. By 6 May 1909, it was noted that Simpson had left "on a long sea voyage leaving his son, Mr James M. Simpson a power of attorney to act for him". By July of that year he was known to owe £858 8s 7d (equivalent to £117,973 in 2023) for Harrogate and Pickering rents, and he was issued a distraint for goods from Oakdale. Nevertheless, on the basis of his former reputation the Duchy of Lancaster continued to do business with him. By 1912 Simpson had left Oakdale and by 1914 he had moved to Bolden Lodge, Kent Road, Harrogate. However, although his Harrogate office continued his business, he soon moved again, to Bury St Edmunds, returning to the town at the end of 1916.

== Civic duty and other activities ==
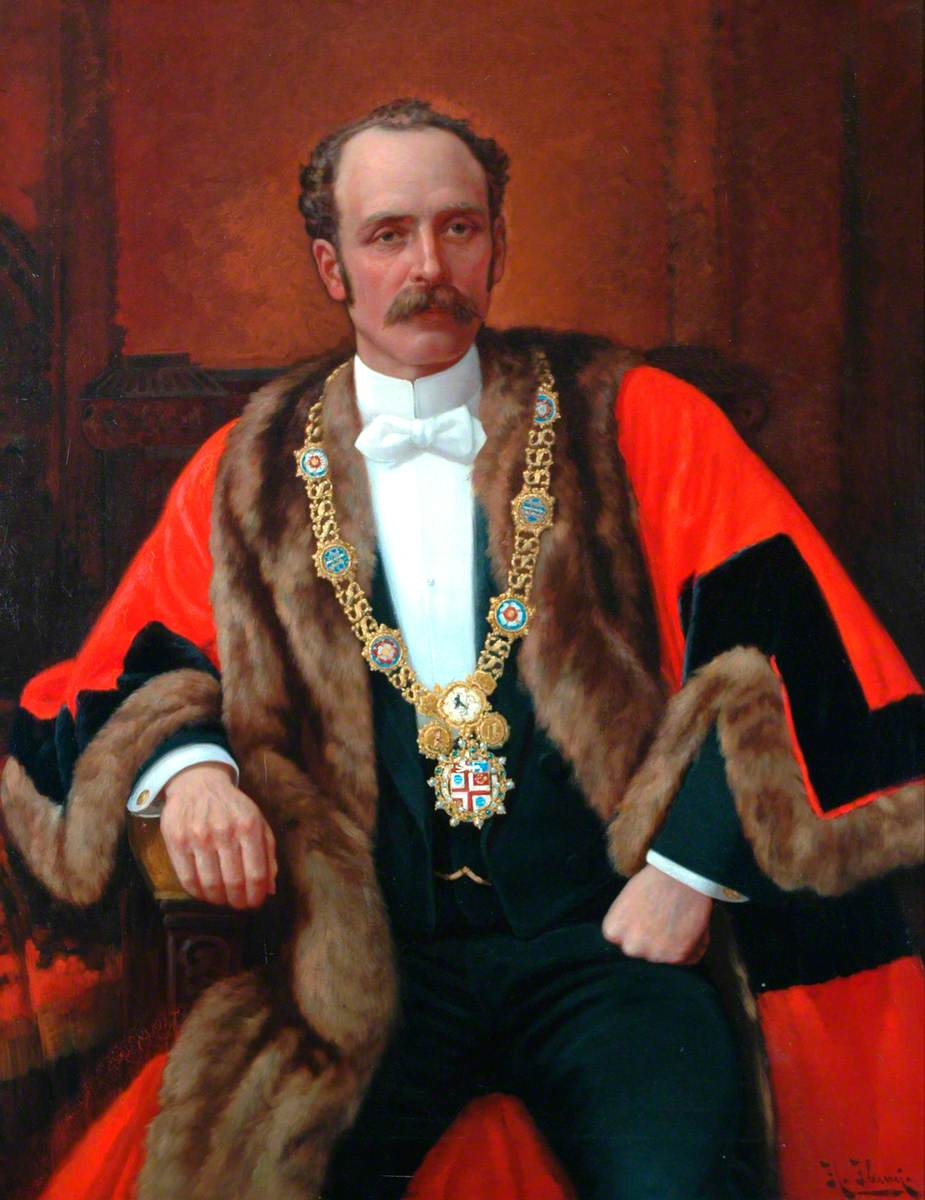
David Simpson by H. Lewis, 1900

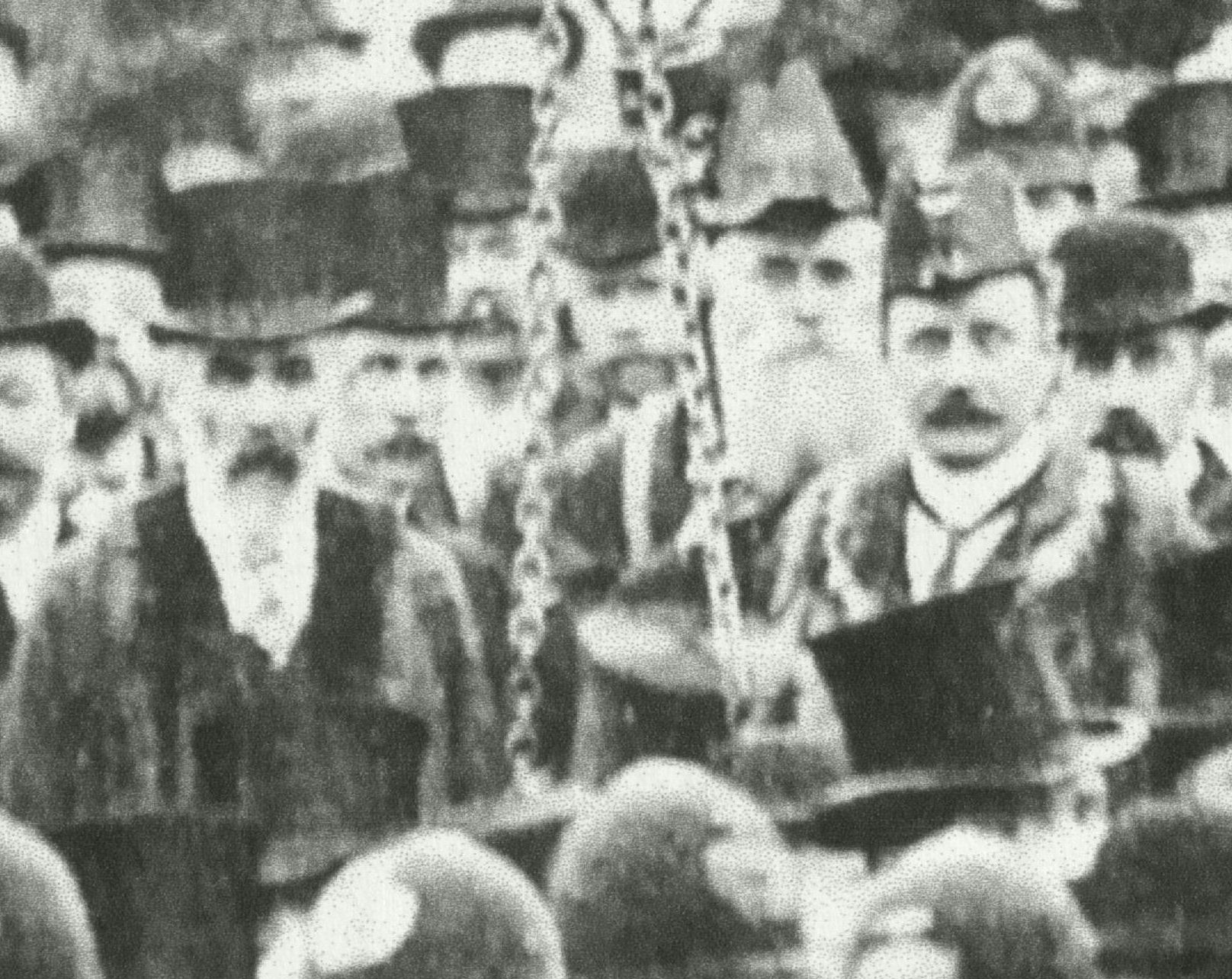
Simpson (right) laying the Kursaal's foundation stone, 1902

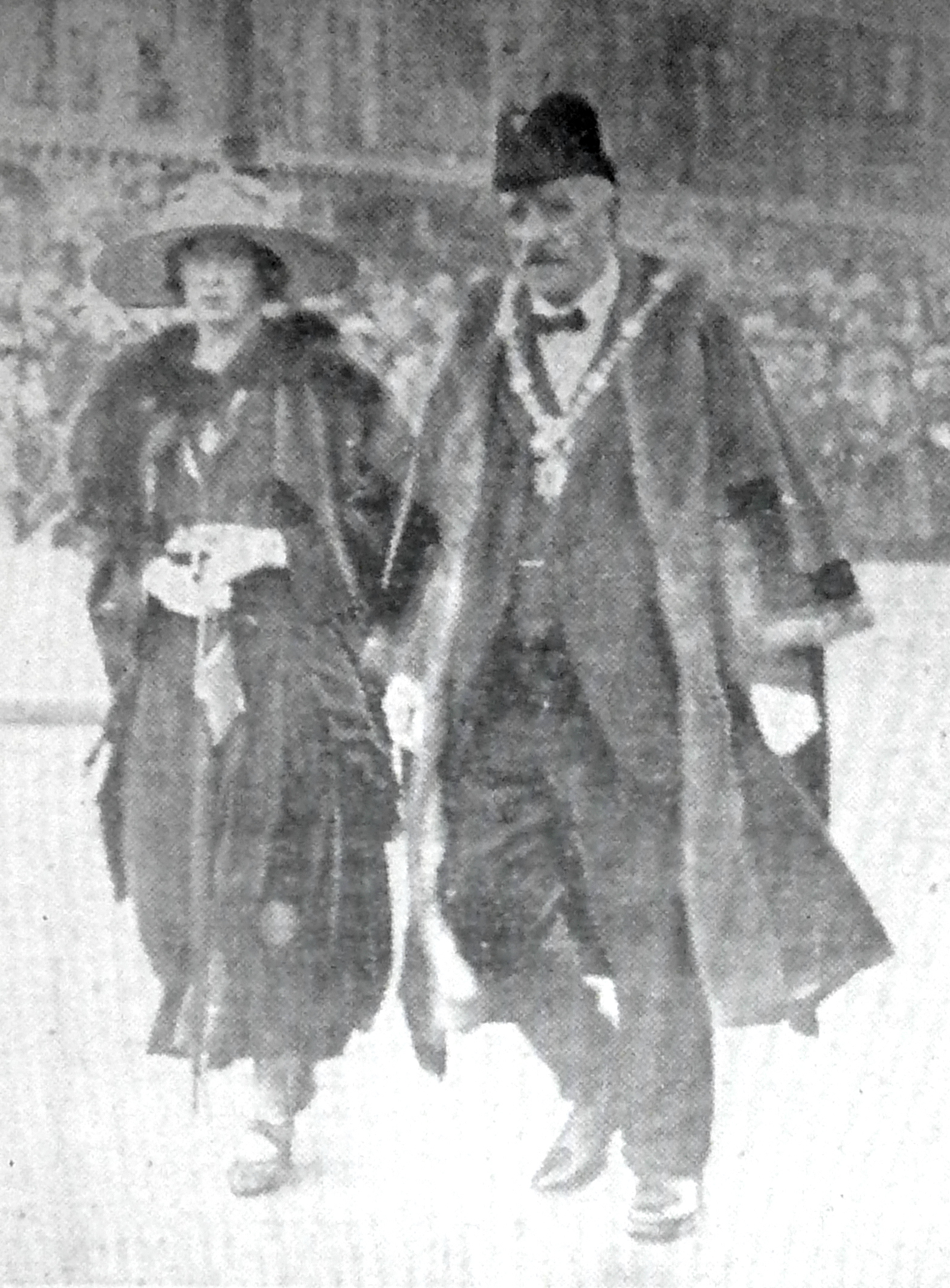
Simpson at the unveiling of Harrogate War Memorial, 1923

Simpson was a "prominent figure in the civic, social and business life of Harrogate for over 40 years", and by the end of his civic career he was termed the "father" of HarrogateTown Council. He joined his father, Alderman James Simpson, at Harrogate Borough Council in 1887, was made an alderman in 1898, and remained a member for 34 years, He was four times mayor of Harrogate, during the periods 1895–1896, and 1901–1902 (as mayor for the coronation year of Edward VII), and thrice deputy mayor, and in 1923 was elected the first honorary Freeman of the Borough of Harrogate, "in recognition of his eminent public service". Simpson became a justice of the peace in 1895. Between 1897 and 1910, and again in 1927, he served on the Aldermanic Bench. He was also chairman of the General Purposes Committee, and all of the council's primary committees. By the end of his membership of Harrogate Council, he was the oldest councillor. The Yorkshire Evening Post said:

During his lengthy service on the Council [Simpson] probably did more than any other man to establish Harrogate as a leading health resort by his unremitting care and attention to the welfare and government of the spa ... He was a prime mover in the establishment of the Royal Baths, and had the honour of turning on the water for the first time. He also laid the foundation stone for the Royal Hall [then known as the Kursaal]. (Note: Simpson laid the foundation stone of the Kursaal in 1902)

Simpson was a member of the Harrogate and Divisional Conservative Associations, and at one time was president of the Bilton Ward Conservatives. He served on the Knaresborough Board of Guardians and from 1901, for almost seven years, he was an alderman of West Riding County Council.

Simpson was a Freemason, and concurrently president of Oakdale Golf Club, Harrogate's Cricket and Athletic Club and the Old Boys' Rugby Football Club.

=== Sea trips ===
When Simpson fled the effects of his crash in 1909, he departed from Liverpool with his wife on the RMS Lusitania, listing their home as the mansion Oakdale, although they were about to lose it to pay debts. They arrived in New York on 23 April 1909, and carried £100 (equivalent to £13,167 in 2023) with them.

In retirement, Simpson and his wife went on at least two sea voyages. In 1921, they returned from Cape Town on the SS Llanstephan Castle, sister ship of HMHS Llandovery Castle, to Southampton, via Madeira and East London, arriving on 11 February 1921. (Note: Hannah Simpson's name is recorded in error as "Anna" on the 1921 sea voyage.) In 1926 they returned on the RMS Windsor Castle from Durban, South Africa to Southampton, via Port Elizabeth, Cape Town, Madeira and East London, arriving on 15 March 1926. Their address was given as 42 Kent Road, Harrogate.

== Death ==
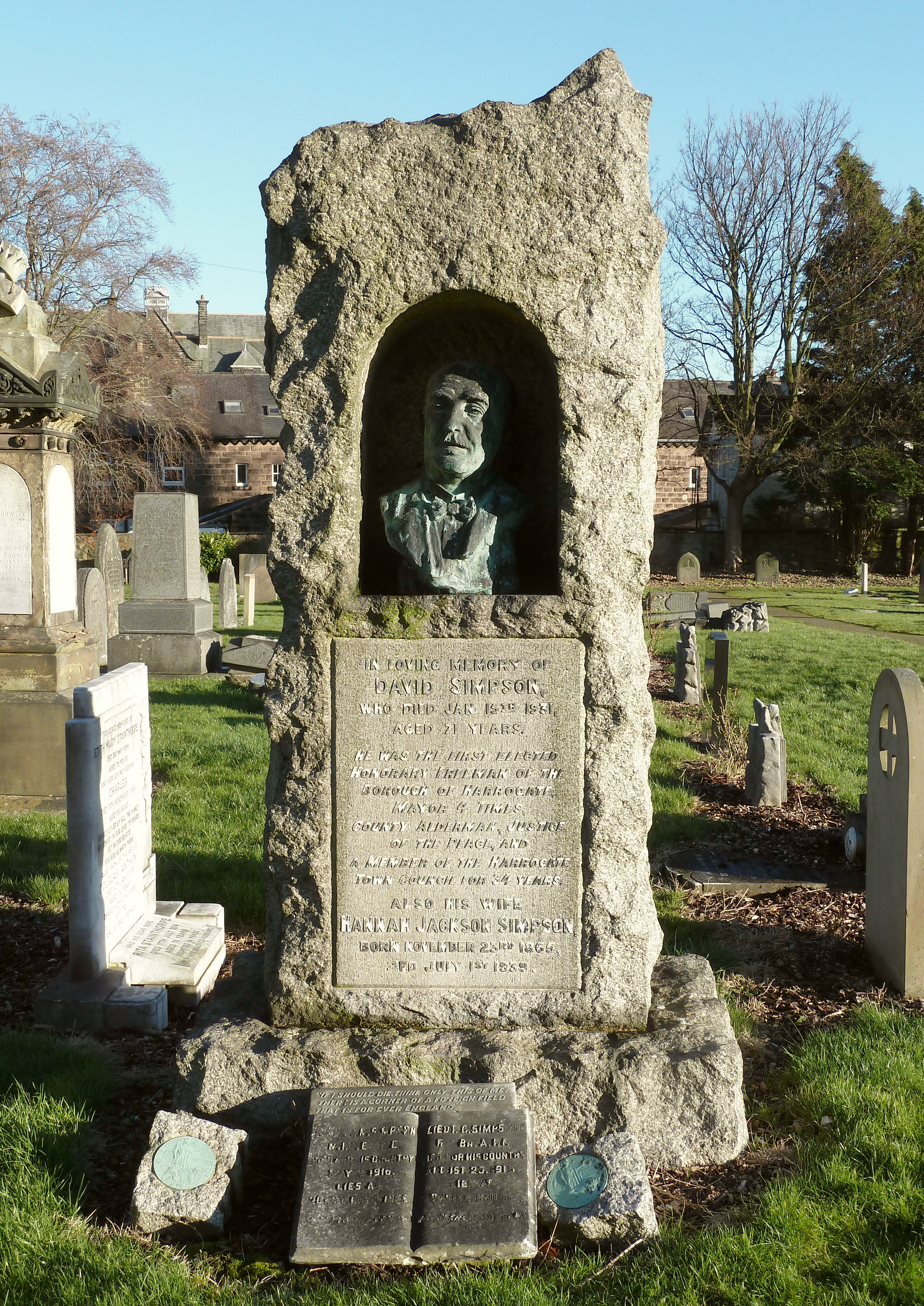
Simpson's gravestone at Grove Road Cemetery

Following a long illness which had made him an invalid, Simpson died, aged 71, on 15 January 1931, at his home, 36 Rutland Road, Harrogate. (Note: GRO index: Deaths Mar 1931 Simpson David 71 Knaresbro' 9a 154)

Simpson's funeral took place on 17 January 1931 at St Wilfrid's Church, Harrogate, and he was interred at Grove Road Cemetery. His will was proved on 14 August 1931. His effects were valued at £69,890 14s 3d (equivalent to £5,998,329 in 2023).
