= 2007 Harrogate Borough Council election =

2007 UK local government election

Map of the results

The 2007 Harrogate Council election took place on 3 May 2007 to elect members of Harrogate Borough Council in North Yorkshire, England. One third of the council was up for election and the council stayed under no overall control.

After the election, the composition of the council was

- Conservative 25
- Liberal Democrat 23
- Independent 6

== Campaign ==
Before the election the Conservatives ran the council, but without a majority, with 27 seats, compared to 22 Liberal Democrats and 5 independents. 20 seats were contested in the election, with 1 of the seats being a by-election in Marston Moor ward after the resignation of the Conservative councillor. Both the Conservatives and Liberal Democrats were defending 9 seats in the election, while independents held 2.

The election saw the British National Party contest 15 of the 20 seats, more than Labour who only contested 9 seats, and up from only 1 in 2006. The leader of the British National Party Nick Griffin visited Ripon during the campaign, with the party campaigning against migrant workers, such as those from Poland, who they said were "undercutting British workers" by working for low wages. For the first time the United Kingdom Independence Party also contested 2 seats in the election.

== Election result ==
The results saw no party win a majority on the council after the Liberal Democrats gained 2 seats from the Conservatives. The Liberal Democrats gained Bilton and Knaresborough King James from the Conservatives, but the Conservatives remained the largest party on the council with 25 seats compared to 23 for the Liberal Democrats.

The balance on the council was held by 6 independents, after independents won all 3 seats contested in Ripon. This included gaining Ripon Spa by 171 votes from Liberal Democrat Paul Freeman, who had held the seat for 16 years. No other party won any seats, with the British National Party coming no better than third in every seat they contested, despite having 15 candidates.

Harrogate local election result 2007
Party	Seats	Gains	Losses	Net gain/loss	Seats %	Votes %	Votes	+/−
Liberal Democrats	10	2	1	+1	50.0	45.9	14,904	+0.1%
Conservative	7	0	2	-2	35.0	38.0	12,331	-2.4%
Independent	3	1	0	+1	15.0	8.1	2,640	-1.6%
BNP	0	0	0	0	0	4.3	1,386	+3.8%
Labour	0	0	0	0	0	3.3	1,055	-0.3%
UKIP	0	0	0	0	0	0.4	128	+0.4%

== Ward results ==
Bilton
Party	Candidate	Votes	%	±%
Liberal Democrats	Andrew Parkes	974	49.4	−3.0
Conservative	Robin Adderley	877	44.5	+0.0
Labour	Joel Banner	122	6.2	+3.1
Majority		97	4.9	−3.0
Turnout		1,973	46.9	+5.8
Liberal Democrats gain from Conservative		Swing		

Granby
Party	Candidate	Votes	%	±%
Liberal Democrats	Margaret-Ann De Courcey-Bayley	923	66.0	−8.8
Conservative	David Pearson	296	21.2	+0.7
BNP	Steven Gill	103	7.4	+7.4
Labour	Tom King	76	5.4	+0.7
Majority		627	44.8	−9.5
Turnout		1,398	31.7	−0.2
Liberal Democrats hold		Swing		

Harlow Moor
Party	Candidate	Votes	%	±%
Conservative	Simon Theakston	1,057	62.0	+0.2
Liberal Democrats	Matthew Webber	567	33.3	−4.9
Labour	Kevin McNerney	81	4.8	+4.8
Majority		490	28.7	+5.1
Turnout		1,705	40.8	−0.1
Conservative hold		Swing		

High Harrogate
Party	Candidate	Votes	%	±%
Conservative	Andrew Jones	815	54.0	+2.1
Liberal Democrats	Steve Macare	522	34.6	−8.6
BNP	John Bray	104	6.9	+6.9
Labour	Harry Mann	69	4.6	−0.3
Majority		293	19.4	+10.7
Turnout		1,510	34.5	−3.3
Conservative hold		Swing		

Hookstone
Party	Candidate	Votes	%	±%
Liberal Democrats	Reg Marsh	1,202	65.4	+3.8
Conservative	Richard Cain	467	25.4	−9.9
BNP	Frederick Johnson	112	6.1	+6.1
Labour	Patricia Foxall	57	3.1	+0.0
Majority		735	40.0	+13.7
Turnout		1,838	41.9	−0.5
Liberal Democrats hold		Swing		

Knaresborough East
Party	Candidate	Votes	%	±%
Liberal Democrats	Keith Rothwell	621	45.1	−14.3
Conservative	Chris Williams	330	23.9	−6.7
Independent	Andy Wright	270	19.6	+19.6
Labour	David Crosthwaite	93	6.7	−3.3
BNP	Belinda Holdsworth	64	4.6	+4.6
Majority		291	21.1	−7.7
Turnout		1,378	35.4	+0.2
Liberal Democrats hold		Swing		

Knaresborough King James
Party	Candidate	Votes	%	±%
Liberal Democrats	Jean Burdett	1,031	55.5	+5.6
Conservative	Tim Hunter	716	38.6	−7.6
Labour	Sam Clayton	110	5.9	+2.0
Majority		315	17.0	+13.2
Turnout		1,857	47.4	−0.6
Liberal Democrats gain from Conservative		Swing		

Knaresborough Scriven Park
Party	Candidate	Votes	%	±%
Liberal Democrats	Kevin Hawkins	740	52.5	−0.5
Conservative	Nathan Smith	496	35.2	−3.1
Labour	Alan Beatham	95	6.7	−2.0
BNP	Mark Strike	78	5.5	+5.5
Majority		244	17.3	+2.7
Turnout		1,409	37.0	−1.7
Liberal Democrats hold		Swing		

Low Harrogate
Party	Candidate	Votes	%	±%
Conservative	Jean Butterfield	862	54.3	−0.7
Liberal Democrats	Carol Brooks	725	45.7	+0.7
Majority		137	8.6	−1.4
Turnout		1,587	38.3	+1.9
Conservative hold		Swing		

Marston Moor
Party	Candidate	Votes	%	±%
Conservative	John Savage	630	65.9	−12.2
Liberal Democrats	Gill Firth	326	34.1	+12.2
Majority		304	31.8	−24.5
Turnout		956	43.8	−12.1
Conservative hold		Swing		

New Park
Party	Candidate	Votes	%	±%
Liberal Democrats	Trevor Chapman	1,080	75.3	+3.7
Conservative	Lorien Pilling	211	14.7	−13.7
BNP	Julie Brown	92	6.4	+6.4
UKIP	John Upex	51	3.6	+3.6
Majority		869	60.6	+17.4
Turnout		1,434	35.4	+1.0
Liberal Democrats hold		Swing		

Pannal
Party	Candidate	Votes	%	±%
Conservative	Mike Gardner	1,455	66.3	−7.4
Liberal Democrats	Claire Kelley	741	33.7	+9.7
Majority		714	32.5	−17.2
Turnout		2,196	51.3	+1.1
Conservative hold		Swing		

Ripon Minster
Party	Candidate	Votes	%	±%
Independent	Sidney Hawke	665	47.3	+0.1
Liberal Democrats	Steve Jones	245	17.4	+10.6
Conservative	John Topping	203	14.4	+1.9
Independent	Stanley Mackintosh	160	11.4	−17.1
BNP	Tom Linden	134	9.5	+9.5
Majority		420	29.9	+11.3
Turnout		1,407	36.1	+2.4
Independent hold		Swing		

Ripon Moorside
Party	Candidate	Votes	%	±%
Independent	Charles Powell	913	61.4	−27.1
Liberal Democrats	John Stockdale	255	17.2	+17.2
Conservative	Tony Simpson	204	13.7	+2.2
BNP	Neil Smith	114	7.7	+7.7
Majority		658	44.3	−22.8
Turnout		1,486	38.7	+1.1
Independent hold		Swing		

Ripon Spa
Party	Candidate	Votes	%	±%
Independent	Peter Horton	632	39.9	−5.3
Liberal Democrats	Paul Freeman	461	29.1	+4.6
Conservative	Andrew Palmer	366	23.1	−7.2
BNP	Michelle Shrubb	123	7.8	+7.8
Majority		171	10.8	−4.2
Turnout		1,582	39.4	+1.3
Independent gain from Liberal Democrats		Swing		

Rossett
Party	Candidate	Votes	%	±%
Conservative	Jim Clark	1,393	59.8	+3.1
Liberal Democrats	James Jones	882	37.8	−5.5
Labour	Michael Lawn	56	2.4	+2.4
Majority		511	21.9	+8.4
Turnout		2,331	49.9	−0.9
Conservative hold		Swing		

Saltergate
Party	Candidate	Votes	%	±%
Liberal Democrats	Geoffrey Webber	807	55.7	+2.9
Conservative	Heather Adderley	493	34.0	−8.4
UKIP	Ray Kidd	77	5.3	+5.3
BNP	James Thackray	71	4.9	+4.9
Majority		314	21.7	+11.4
Turnout		1,448	35.2	−3.4
Liberal Democrats hold		Swing		

Starbeck
Party	Candidate	Votes	%	±%
Liberal Democrats	Granville Ward	1,081	72.2	+7.7
Conservative	Phillip Dixon	195	13.0	−0.8
BNP	Colin Banner	146	9.7	−1.0
Labour	Geoff Foxall	76	5.1	+0.5
Majority		886	59.1	+8.5
Turnout		1,498	35.2	−0.8
Liberal Democrats hold		Swing		

Stray
Party	Candidate	Votes	%	±%
Conservative	Pat Jones	1,034	54.5	−1.3
Liberal Democrats	Nick Anderson	811	42.8	−1.4
BNP	Robert Green	51	2.7	+2.7
Majority		223	11.8	+0.3
Turnout		1,896	44.7	−0.2
Conservative hold		Swing		

Woodfield
Party	Candidate	Votes	%	±%
Liberal Democrats	John Wren	910	58.5	−7.3
Conservative	Mary Dilworth	231	14.9	−2.7
Labour	Daniel Maguire	220	14.1	−2.6
BNP	Russell Taylor	194	12.5	+12.5
Majority		679	43.7	−4.5
Turnout		1,555	37.7	+0.4
Liberal Democrats hold		Swing		
