= 2006 Harrogate Borough Council election =

2006 UK local government election

Map of the results

The 2006 Harrogate Council election took place on 4 May 2006 to elect members of Harrogate Borough Council in North Yorkshire, England. One third of the council was up for election and the Conservative Party lost overall control of the council to no overall control.

After the election, the composition of the council was:

- Conservative 27
- Liberal Democrat 22
- Independent 5

== Background ==
Before the election the Conservatives controlled the council with 29 of the 54 seats. 19 seats were contested in the election, with the Conservatives defending 8, the Liberal Democrats 9 and independents 2. The Conservatives stood in every ward, while the Liberal Democrats contested 18 of the 19 wards. A Conservative cabinet member Alan Skidmore stepped down as a councillor at the election after previously representing Ripon Spa ward.

== Election result ==
The results saw the Conservatives lose their majority on the council after losing 3 seats. They finished with 27 seats, half of the 54 seats, after Bilton and Knaresborough King James were gained by the Liberal Democrats. The Conservatives also lost another seat in Ripon to an independent, but did gain High Harrogate from the Liberal Democrats. This meant the Liberal Democrats ended with 22 seats and there were 5 independents, after the independents won all 3 seats in Ripon. Overall turnout was nearly 40%, a little above the national average.

Harrogate local election result 2006
Party	Seats	Gains	Losses	Net gain/loss	Seats %	Votes %	Votes	+/−
Liberal Democrats	10	2	1	+1	52.6	45.8	14,065	+11.6
Conservative	6	1	3	-2	31.6	40.4	12,420	-22.1
Independent	3	1	0	+1	15.8	9.7	2,996	+7.2
Labour	0	0	0	0	0.0	3.6	1,092	+3.6
BNP	0	0	0	0	0.0	0.5	162	-0.2

== Ward results ==
Bilton
Party	Candidate	Votes	%	±%
Liberal Democrats	Morris Lightfoot	906	52.4	+7.1
Conservative	Heather Adderley	770	44.5	−6.3
Labour	Harinder Mann	53	3.1	−0.8
Majority		136	7.9	
Turnout		1,729	41.1	+0.3
Liberal Democrats gain from Conservative		Swing		

Granby
Party	Candidate	Votes	%	±%
Liberal Democrats	John Fox	1,008	74.8	+8.6
Conservative	David Pearson	276	20.5	−4.8
Labour	David King	63	4.7	−3.7
Majority		732	54.3	+13.4
Turnout		1,347	31.9	+8.1
Liberal Democrats hold		Swing		

Harlow Moor
Party	Candidate	Votes	%	±%
Conservative	Donald MacKenzie	1,049	61.8	−2.6
Liberal Democrats	Matthew Webber	648	38.2	+7.0
Majority		401	23.6	−9.6
Turnout		1,697	40.9	+2.3
Conservative hold		Swing		

High Harrogate
Party	Candidate	Votes	%	±%
Conservative	Jayne Brotherton	808	51.9	+3.3
Liberal Democrats	Stephen Macare	674	43.2	−2.0
Labour	Deborah Havercroft	76	4.9	−1.3
Majority		136	8.7	+5.3
Turnout		1,556	37.8	+5.7
Conservative gain from Liberal Democrats		Swing		

Hookstone
Party	Candidate	Votes	%	±%
Liberal Democrats	Patricia Marsh	1,137	61.6	+5.2
Conservative	Richard Cain	652	35.3	−4.7
Labour	Patricia Foxall	57	3.1	−0.5
Majority		485	26.3	+10.0
Turnout		1,846	42.4	+3.6
Liberal Democrats hold		Swing		

Knaresborough East
Party	Candidate	Votes	%	±%
Liberal Democrats	Christine Willoughby	795	59.4	−2.5
Conservative	Timothy Hunter	409	30.6	−7.5
Labour	David Crosthwaite	134	10.0	+10.0
Majority		386	28.8	+4.9
Turnout		1,338	35.2	+6.5
Liberal Democrats hold		Swing		

Knaresborough King James
Party	Candidate	Votes	%	±%
Liberal Democrats	Bill Hoult	927	49.9	+4.0
Conservative	Michael Gallico	857	46.2	−1.7
Labour	Simon Hutchings	72	3.9	−2.3
Majority		70	3.8	
Turnout		1,856	48.0	+7.1
Liberal Democrats gain from Conservative		Swing		

Knaresborough Scriven Park
Party	Candidate	Votes	%	±%
Liberal Democrats	Anne Jones	768	53.0	+15.6
Conservative	Robert Aspin	556	38.3	+1.9
Labour	Alan Beatham	126	8.7	+8.7
Majority		212	14.6	+13.6
Turnout		1,450	38.7	+1.6
Liberal Democrats hold		Swing		

Low Harrogate
Party	Candidate	Votes	%	±%
Conservative	Eric Cooper	781	55.0	−10.5
Liberal Democrats	Carol Brooks	639	45.0	+15.9
Majority		142	10.0	−26.4
Turnout		1,420	36.4	+5.5
Conservative hold		Swing		

New Park
Party	Candidate	Votes	%	±%
Liberal Democrats	John Lockhart	954	71.6	+5.9
Conservative	Geoffrey Tweedy	378	28.4	+1.5
Majority		576	43.2	+4.4
Turnout		1,332	34.4	+7.9
Liberal Democrats hold		Swing		

Pannal
Party	Candidate	Votes	%	±%
Conservative	Frederick Willis	1,593	73.7	+9.7
Liberal Democrats	Neil Gledhill	518	24.0	−8.3
Labour	Cynthia Coltman	50	2.3	−1.5
Majority		1,075	49.7	+18.0
Turnout		2,161	50.2	+3.3
Conservative hold		Swing		

Ripon Minster
Party	Candidate	Votes	%	±%
Independent	Pauline McHardy	605	47.2	+47.2
Independent	Stuart Martin	366	28.5	+28.5
Conservative	John Topping	160	12.5	−19.5
Liberal Democrats	Phillip Barlow	87	6.8	−61.2
Labour	Elizabeth Barclay	65	5.1	+5.1
Majority		239	18.6	
Turnout		1,283	33.7	+4.6
Independent hold		Swing		

Ripon Moorside
Party	Candidate	Votes	%	±%
Independent	Andrew Williams	1,266	88.5	+37.0
Conservative	Francis Woodward	164	11.5	−14.9
Majority		1,102	77.1	+52.0
Turnout		1,430	37.6	+1.8
Independent hold		Swing		

Ripon Spa
Party	Candidate	Votes	%	±%
Independent	David Parnaby	662	45.2	+45.2
Conservative	Anthony Simpson	443	30.3	−16.5
Liberal Democrats	John Stockdale	358	24.5	−28.7
Majority		219	15.0	
Turnout		1,463	38.1	+3.3
Independent gain from Conservative		Swing		

Rossett
Party	Candidate	Votes	%	±%
Conservative	Robert Nash	1,352	56.7	−0.8
Liberal Democrats	David Jacobs	1,031	43.3	+4.0
Majority		321	13.5	−4.7
Turnout		2,383	50.8	+5.0
Conservative hold		Swing		

Saltergate
Party	Candidate	Votes	%	±%
Liberal Democrats	Michael Newby	832	52.8	−0.4
Conservative	Raymond Forward	669	42.4	−4.4
Labour	Janet Morrow	75	4.8	+4.8
Majority		163	10.3	+3.8
Turnout		1,576	38.6	+12.3
Liberal Democrats hold		Swing		

Starbeck
Party	Candidate	Votes	%	±%
Liberal Democrats	Philip Broadbank	978	64.5	−3.6
Conservative	Phillip Dixon	210	13.8	−8.1
BNP	Colin Banner	162	10.7	+10.7
Independent	David Rimington	97	6.4	+6.4
Labour	Geoffrey Foxall	70	4.6	−5.4
Majority		768	50.6	+4.4
Turnout		1,517	36.0	+9.7
Liberal Democrats hold		Swing		

Stray
Party	Candidate	Votes	%	±%
Conservative	Clifford Trotter	1,029	55.8	+3.2
Liberal Democrats	Andrew Parkes	816	44.2	−0.2
Majority		213	11.5	+3.3
Turnout		1,845	44.9	−1.4
Conservative hold		Swing		

Woodfield
Party	Candidate	Votes	%	±%
Liberal Democrats	Andrew Goss	989	65.8	+13.9
Conservative	Mary Dilworth	264	17.6	+0.3
Labour	Daniel Maguire	251	16.7	−14.1
Majority		725	48.2	+27.1
Turnout		1,504	37.3	+6.5
Liberal Democrats hold		Swing		
