= 2002 Harrogate Borough Council election =

Election in North Yorkshire, England

Map of the results

The 2002 Harrogate Council election took place on 2 May 2002 to elect members of Harrogate Borough Council in North Yorkshire, England. The whole council was up for election with boundary changes since the last election in 2000 reducing the number of seats by 5. The Liberal Democrats lost overall control of the council to no overall control.

== Campaign ==
Before the election the Liberal Democrats had a majority on the council with 39 councillors, compared to 19 Conservatives and one Labour councillor. Boundary changes meant that every seat was being contested for the first time since 1974. The changes reduced the number of councillors by five from 59 to 54, while increasing the number of wards from 32 to 35.

As well as candidates from the three main political parties, there were also five independents. However Wathvale ward saw the Conservative former group leader Chris Brown elected after no other candidates were nominated for the ward.

Car parking charges in Ripon were an issue in the run up to the election, with the Conservatives attacking them, but the Liberal Democrat council announced that they would end the charges in the market place in the month before the election.

== Election result ==
The results saw the Liberal Democrats lose their majority on the council, after winning exactly half the seats on the council. The results came down to the final ward to declare in Bilton, with the Liberal Democrats and Conservatives winning one seat each in the ward. This meant the Liberal Democrats has 27 seats, compared to 26 for the Conservatives and 1 independent, Andrew Williams.

Harrogate local election result 2002
Party	Seats	Gains	Losses	Net gain/loss	Seats %	Votes %	Votes	+/−
Liberal Democrats	27			-12	50.0	46.3	32,370	+2.2%
Conservative	26			+7	48.1	45.0	31,520	-1.7%
Independent	1			+1	1.9	2.9	2,020	+2.9%
Labour	0			-1	0	5.8	4,073	-3.3%

== Ward results ==
Bilton (2)
Party	Candidate	Votes	%	±%
Conservative	Heather Adderley	798		
Liberal Democrats	Morris Lightfoot	787		
Conservative	Robin Adderley	776		
Liberal Democrats	David Richold	665		
Labour	Norman Dobell	115		
Turnout		3,141	38.5	

Bishop Monkton
Party	Candidate	Votes	%	±%
Conservative	Ian Galloway	572	54.7	
Liberal Democrats	Phillip Barlow	474	45.3	
Majority		98	9.4	
Turnout		1,046	49.3	

Boroughbridge
Party	Candidate	Votes	%	±%
Conservative	Brian Lumsden	379	56.2	
Liberal Democrats	Peter Phillips	237	35.2	
Labour	Ruth Dicken	58	8.6	
Majority		142	21.1	
Turnout		674	29.6	

Claro
Party	Candidate	Votes	%	±%
Conservative	Matthew Bean	774	69.3	
Liberal Democrats	Keith Rothwell	343	30.7	
Majority		431	38.6	
Turnout		1,117	46.0	

Granby (2)
Party	Candidate	Votes	%	±%
Liberal Democrats	John Fox	818		
Liberal Democrats	Margaret-Ann De Courcey-Bayley	783		
Conservative	David Pearson	222		
Conservative	Pamela Singleton	203		
Labour	David King	114		
Turnout		2,140	26.5	

Harlow Moor (2)
Party	Candidate	Votes	%	±%
Conservative	David Simister	1,080		
Conservative	Simon Theakston	1,051		
Liberal Democrats	Jane Blayney	754		
Liberal Democrats	Peter Turner	655		
Independent	Andrew Bradwell	201		
Labour	Kenneth Jones	75		
Turnout		3,816	46.0	

High Harrogate (2)
Party	Candidate	Votes	%	±%
Liberal Democrats	Stephen Macare	658		
Liberal Democrats	Matthew Webber	546		
Conservative	William Hartmann	404		
Conservative	Catherine Peyton	400		
Independent	Peter Armitage	177		
Labour	Eric Cunningham	119		
Turnout		2,304	28.1	

Hookstone (2)
Party	Candidate	Votes	%	±%
Liberal Democrats	Patricia Marsh	1,114		
Liberal Democrats	Reginald Marsh	1,030		
Conservative	Michael Laycock	645		
Conservative	David Rimington	628		
Labour	Mark France	96		
Turnout		3,513	41.6	

Killinghall
Party	Candidate	Votes	%	±%
Conservative	Michael Bury	723	73.7	
Liberal Democrats	John Stockdale	258	26.3	
Majority		465	47.4	
Turnout		981	44.3	

Kirkby Malzeard
Party	Candidate	Votes	%	±%
Conservative	Margaret Atkinson	703	69.3	
Liberal Democrats	Ernest O'Keefe	312	30.7	
Majority		391	38.5	
Turnout		1,015	47.2	

Knaresborough East (2)
Party	Candidate	Votes	%	±%
Liberal Democrats	Bill Hoult	647		
Liberal Democrats	David Tankard	630		
Conservative	Robert Aspin	402		
Conservative	Malcolm Jackson	394		
Labour	Althea Farmer	289		
Labour	Malcolm Hayton	264		
Turnout		2,626	34.2	

Knaresborough King James (2)
Party	Candidate	Votes	%	±%
Conservative	John Smith	760		
Conservative	Diana Smith	756		
Liberal Democrats	Richard Hall	714		
Liberal Democrats	Terence Maude	690		
Labour	David Crosthwaite	170		
Labour	Simon Hutchings	127		
Turnout		3,217	42.5	

Knaresborough Scriven Park (2)
Party	Candidate	Votes	%	±%
Liberal Democrats	Anne Jones	550		
Liberal Democrats	Kevin Hawkins	541		
Labour	Andrew Wright	516		
Conservative	Michael Hill	416		
Labour	Alan Beatham	401		
Conservative	Myra Smith	383		
Turnout		2,807	37.6	

Low Harrogate (2)
Party	Candidate	Votes	%	±%
Conservative	Eric Cooper	885		
Conservative	Jean Butterfield	882		
Liberal Democrats	Ruth Alliston	553		
Liberal Democrats	John Marshall	512		
Labour	Christine Colman	102		
Turnout		2,934	36.6	

Lower Nidderdale
Party	Candidate	Votes	%	±%
Liberal Democrats	Thomas Watson	646	50.4	
Conservative	Elwyn Hinchcliffe	637	49.6	
Majority		9	0.7	
Turnout		1,283	55.0	

Marston Moor
Party	Candidate	Votes	%	±%
Conservative	Julian Sturdy	508	53.5	
Liberal Democrats	Gillean Firth	366	38.6	
Labour	Patrick O'Connor	75	7.9	
Majority		142	15.0	
Turnout		949	43.5	

Mashamshire
Party	Candidate	Votes	%	±%
Conservative	Nigel Simms	525	71.8	
Liberal Democrats	John Foster	206	28.2	
Majority		319	43.6	
Turnout		731	39.8	

New Park (2)
Party	Candidate	Votes	%	±%
Liberal Democrats	Joan Crowther	755		
Liberal Democrats	Wendy Richards	749		
Conservative	Andrew Dennis	277		
Conservative	Sally Dennis	266		
Labour	Bryan Robinson	103		
Turnout		2,150	27.7	

Newby
Party	Candidate	Votes	%	±%
Conservative	Clifford Wilson	490	62.7	
Liberal Democrats	Penelope Harriso	292	37.3	
Majority		198	25.3	
Turnout		782	33.2	

Nidd Valley
Party	Candidate	Votes	%	±%
Liberal Democrats	Leslie Ellington	603	64.9	
Conservative	David Carter	326	35.1	
Majority		277	29.8	
Turnout		929	46.7	

Ouseburn
Party	Candidate	Votes	%	±%
Liberal Democrats	Christine Lewis	724	64.9	
Conservative	William Alton	391	35.1	
Majority		333	29.9	
Turnout		1,115	50.1	

Pannal (2)
Party	Candidate	Votes	%	±%
Conservative	Frederick Willis	1,434		
Conservative	Michael Gardner	1,376		
Liberal Democrats	Joan Newby	764		
Liberal Democrats	Ann Morris	706		
Independent	Bryan Dunsby	246		
Labour	Cynthia Coltman	81		
Turnout		4,607	54.2	

Pateley Bridge
Party	Candidate	Votes	%	±%
Liberal Democrats	Stanley Beer	654	88.0	
Labour	Stephen Boyden	89	12.0	
Majority		565	76.0	
Turnout		743	37.7	

Ribston
Party	Candidate	Votes	%	±%
Conservative	Caroline Bayliss	613	71.4	
Liberal Democrats	Pamela Godsell	246	28.6	
Majority		367	42.7	
Turnout		859	37.1	

Ripon Minster (2)
Party	Candidate	Votes	%	±%
Liberal Democrats	Stuart Martin	568		
Liberal Democrats	Sidney Hawke	501		
Conservative	Andrew Collyer	489		
Conservative	Stanley Mackintosh	475		
Turnout		2,033	27.4	

Ripon Moorside (2)
Party	Candidate	Votes	%	±%
Independent	Andrew Williams	1,101		
Conservative	Anthony Simpson	379		
Liberal Democrats	Stephen Jones	375		
Liberal Democrats	David Harrison	356		
Conservative	Francis Woodward	341		
Turnout		2,552	38.9	

Ripon Spa (2)
Party	Candidate	Votes	%	±%
Liberal Democrats	Alan Skidmore	813		
Liberal Democrats	Paul Freeman	755		
Conservative	Rosemarie Curlewis	610		
Conservative	Peter Pearson	587		
Turnout		2,765	38.9	

Rossett (2)
Party	Candidate	Votes	%	±%
Conservative	Robert Nash	1,259		
Conservative	James Clark	1,209		
Liberal Democrats	Trevor Chapman	746		
Liberal Democrats	Philip Boddy	724		
Labour	George Mountford	114		
Turnout		4,052	45.0	

Saltergate (2)
Party	Candidate	Votes	%	±%
Liberal Democrats	Michael Newby	710		
Liberal Democrats	Geoffrey Webber	704		
Conservative	Brenda Galvin	326		
Conservative	Karen Payne	303		
Turnout		2,043	24.8	

Spofforth with Lower Wharfedale
Party	Candidate	Votes	%	±%
Conservative	Shirley Fawcett	758	75.3	
Liberal Democrats	Jean Burdett	248	24.7	
Majority		510	50.7	
Turnout		1,006	42.3	

Starbeck (2)
Party	Candidate	Votes	%	±%
Liberal Democrats	Philip Broadbank	899		
Liberal Democrats	Granville Ward	785		
Conservative	John Fletcher	279		
Conservative	Phillip Dixon	255		
Labour	Patricia Foxall	134		
Turnout		2,352	29.7	

Stray (2)
Party	Candidate	Votes	%	±%
Conservative	Clifford Trotter	1,016		
Conservative	Patricia Jones	937		
Liberal Democrats	Claire Kelley	880		
Liberal Democrats	Charles Kilpatrick	733		
Independent	Barbara Coultas	295		
Labour	Roger Newby	92		
Turnout		3,953	47.6	

Washburn
Party	Candidate	Votes	%	±%
Conservative	Richard Grange	804	81.4	
Liberal Democrats	Roger Wensley	184	18.6	
Majority		620	62.8	
Turnout		988	42.5	

Wathvale
Party	Candidate	Votes	%	±%
Conservative	Christopher Brown	unopposed		

Woodfield (2)
Party	Candidate	Votes	%	±%
Liberal Democrats	Andrew Goss	714		
Liberal Democrats	John Wren	693		
Labour	Geoffrey Foxall	487		
Labour	Peter Caunt	452		
Conservative	Adam Pritchard	208		
Conservative	Denis Muldoon	206		
Turnout		2,760	35.0	
