= 2003 Harrogate Borough Council election =

2003 UK local government election

Map of the results

The 2003 Harrogate Council election took place on 1 May 2003 to elect members of Harrogate Borough Council in North Yorkshire, England. One third of the council was up for election and the council stayed under no overall control.

After the election, the composition of the council was:

- Conservative 27
- Liberal Democrat 25
- Independent 2

== Campaign ==
Before the election the Liberal Democrats had 27 seats on the council, the Conservatives 26 and there was 1 independent. The campaign saw the national leaders of the Conservative and Liberal Democrat parties, Iain Duncan Smith and Charles Kennedy, visit Harrogate to support their parties.

The Liberal Democrats defended their record in control of the council, pointing to an improvement in the council finances, providing new facilities for the area, keeping Harrogates portion of the council tax rises low and tackling anti-social behaviour. However the Conservatives attacked "over intensive housing development" for causing traffic congestion, said they were the only party opposed to congestion charging, proposed to provide an hours free parking for residents and to work with police to tackle anti-social behaviour.

== Election result ==
The results saw no party win a majority on the council, but the Conservatives became the largest party with 27 seats, compared to 25 for the Liberal Democrats and 2 independents. The Conservatives gained Bilton and High Harrogate wards from the Liberal Democrats, the latter by 656 votes to 610 after a recount. These gains came despite the Liberal Democrats winning slightly more votes overall in the election, 46.5% compared to 44.7% for the Conservatives. However the Conservatives did lose one seat in Ripon Moorside, which was taken by independent Charles Powell. Meanwhile, Labour failed to win any seats and only came second in Woodfield ward. Overall turnout in the election was 34.7%.

Following the election the Conservatives took control of the council, with Conservative Mike Gardner becoming council leader, replacing Liberal Democrat Geoff Webber. Meanwhile, the outgoing mayor of Harrogate Alan Skidmore quit the Liberal Democrats after the election to become an independent, criticising the party both nationally and locally.

Harrogate local election result 2003
Party	Seats	Gains	Losses	Net gain/loss	Seats %	Votes %	Votes	+/−
Liberal Democrats	10	0	2	-2	52.6	46.5	12,557	+0.2%
Conservative	8	2	1	+1	42.1	44.7	12,079	-0.3%
Independent	1	1	0	+1	5.3	4.0	1,077	+1.1%
Labour	0	0	0	0	0	4.9	1,314	-0.9%

== Ward results ==
Bilton
Party	Candidate	Votes	%	±%
Conservative	Robin Adderley	864	50.8	
Liberal Democrats	Morris Lightfoot	770	45.3	
Labour	Norman Dobell	66	3.9	
Majority		94	5.5	
Turnout		1,700	40.8	+2.3
Conservative gain from Liberal Democrats		Swing		

Granby
Party	Candidate	Votes	%	±%
Liberal Democrats	Margaret-Ann De Courcey-Bayley	683	66.2	
Conservative	Paul Needham	261	25.3	
Labour	David King	87	8.4	
Majority		422	40.9	
Turnout		1,031	23.8	−2.7
Liberal Democrats hold		Swing		

Harlow Moor
Party	Candidate	Votes	%	±%
Conservative	Simon Theakston	1,040	64.4	
Liberal Democrats	Michael Kaye	504	31.2	
Labour	Christopher France	71	4.4	
Majority		536	33.2	
Turnout		1,615	38.6	−7.4
Conservative hold		Swing		

High Harrogate
Party	Candidate	Votes	%	±%
Conservative	Andrew Jones	656	48.6	
Liberal Democrats	Matthew Webber	610	45.2	
Labour	Eric Cunningham	83	6.2	
Majority		46	3.4	
Turnout		1,349	32.1	+4.0
Conservative gain from Liberal Democrats		Swing		

Hookstone
Party	Candidate	Votes	%	±%
Liberal Democrats	Reginald Marsh	945	56.4	
Conservative	Michael Laycock	671	40.0	
Labour	Robert Swithinbank	60	3.6	
Majority		274	16.3	
Turnout		1,676	38.8	−2.8
Liberal Democrats hold		Swing		

Knaresborough East
Party	Candidate	Votes	%	±%
Liberal Democrats	Keith Rothwell	677	61.9	
Conservative	Malcolm Jackson	416	38.1	
Majority		261	23.9	
Turnout		1,093	28.7	−5.5
Liberal Democrats hold		Swing		

Knaresborough King James
Party	Candidate	Votes	%	±%
Conservative	Diana Smith	751	47.9	
Liberal Democrats	Richard Hall	719	45.9	
Labour	Simon Hutchings	97	6.2	
Majority		32	2.0	
Turnout		1,567	40.9	−1.6
Conservative hold		Swing		

Knaresborough Scriven Park
Party	Candidate	Votes	%	±%
Liberal Democrats	Kevin Hawkins	530	37.4	
Conservative	Robert Aspin	516	36.4	
Independent	Andrew Wright	373	26.3	
Majority		14	1.0	
Turnout		1,419	37.1	−0.5
Liberal Democrats hold		Swing		

Low Harrogate
Party	Candidate	Votes	%	±%
Conservative	Jean Butterfield	835	65.5	
Liberal Democrats	Michael Paszkowski	371	29.1	
Labour	Christine Colman	69	5.4	
Majority		464	36.4	
Turnout		1,275	30.9	−5.7
Conservative hold		Swing		

New Park
Party	Candidate	Votes	%	±%
Liberal Democrats	Wendy Richards	692	65.7	
Conservative	David Pearson	283	26.9	
Labour	Mark France	79	7.5	
Majority		409	38.8	
Turnout		1,054	26.5	−1.2
Liberal Democrats hold		Swing		

Pannal
Party	Candidate	Votes	%	±%
Conservative	Michael Gardner	1,287	64.0	
Liberal Democrats	Yvonne Jones	649	32.3	
Labour	Cynthia Coltman	76	3.8	
Majority		638	31.7	
Turnout		2,012	46.9	−7.3
Conservative hold		Swing		

Ripon Minster
Party	Candidate	Votes	%	±%
Liberal Democrats	Sidney Hawke	751	68.0	
Conservative	Andrew Collyer	354	32.0	
Majority		397	35.9	
Turnout		1,105	29.1	+1.7
Liberal Democrats hold		Swing		

Ripon Moorside
Party	Candidate	Votes	%	±%
Independent	Charles Powell	704	51.5	
Conservative	Anthony Simpson	361	26.4	
Liberal Democrats	Stephen Jones	303	22.1	
Majority		343	25.1	
Turnout		1,368	35.8	−3.1
Independent gain from Conservative		Swing		

Ripon Spa
Party	Candidate	Votes	%	±%
Liberal Democrats	Paul Freeman	683	53.2	
Conservative	Rosemarie Curlewis	602	46.8	
Majority		81	6.3	
Turnout		1,285	34.8	−4.1
Liberal Democrats hold		Swing		

Rossett
Party	Candidate	Votes	%	±%
Conservative	James Clark	1,170	57.5	
Liberal Democrats	Leslie Parkes	799	39.3	
Labour	Deborah Havercroft	66	3.2	
Majority		371	18.2	
Turnout		2,035	45.8	+0.8
Conservative hold		Swing		

Saltergate
Party	Candidate	Votes	%	±%
Liberal Democrats	Geoffrey Webber	593	53.2	
Conservative	Michael Harrison	521	46.8	
Majority		72	6.5	
Turnout		1,114	26.3	+1.5
Liberal Democrats hold		Swing		

Starbeck
Party	Candidate	Votes	%	±%
Liberal Democrats	Granville Ward	752	68.1	
Conservative	Phillip Dixon	242	21.9	
Labour	Patricia Foxall	111	10.0	
Majority		510	46.2	
Turnout		1,105	26.3	−3.4
Liberal Democrats hold		Swing		

Stray
Party	Candidate	Votes	%	±%
Conservative	Patricia Jones	1,030	52.6	
Liberal Democrats	Claudia Hartley	869	44.4	
Labour	Roger Newby	59	3.0	
Majority		161	8.2	
Turnout		1,958	46.3	−1.3
Conservative hold		Swing		

Woodfield
Party	Candidate	Votes	%	±%
Liberal Democrats	John Wren	657	51.9	
Labour	Peter Caunt	390	30.8	
Conservative	Denis Muldoon	219	17.3	
Majority		267	21.1	
Turnout		1,266	30.8	−4.2
Liberal Democrats hold		Swing		
