= 2012 Harrogate Borough Council election =

2012 UK local government election

Map of the results

The 2012 Harrogate Borough Council election took place on 3 May 2012 to elect members of the Harrogate Borough District Council in North Yorkshire, England. This was on the same day as other 2012 United Kingdom local elections.

Harrogate local election result 2012
Party	Seats	Gains	Losses	Net gain/loss	Seats %	Votes %	Votes	+/−
Conservative	33	1	2	-1		63.7	9,318	-2.1
Liberal Democrats	17	1	1	0		13.5	1,971	-13.5
UKIP	0	0	0	0		2.1	317	+1.5
Independent	3	1	1	0		3.9	566	+0.9
Liberal	1	1	0	+1		4.3	626	+4.3
Labour	0	0	0	0		12.5	1,823	+10.7
