= 2010 Harrogate Borough Council election =

2010 UK local government election

Map of the results

The 2010 Harrogate Council election took place on 6 May 2010 to elect members of Harrogate Borough Council in North Yorkshire, England. One third of the council was up for election and the Conservative Party gained overall control of the council from no overall control.

After the election, the composition of the council was:

- Conservative 28
- Liberal Democrat 22
- Independent 4

== Election result ==
The results saw the Conservative Party win a majority on the council after making a net gain of 1 seat to hold 28 of the 54 seats. The Conservatives took the seats of Ripon Minster and Ripon Spa from independents, but lost a seat to the Liberal Democrats in High Harrogate. Control of the council came down to the last seat declared in Low Harrogate, with the Conservative holding the seat by 6 votes over the Liberal Democrats to gain a majority. This meant the Liberal Democrats ended 1 seat up on 22 councillors, while the independents lost 2 to have 4 seats. Overall turnout in the election was 68.30%.

Harrogate local election result 2010
Party	Seats	Gains	Losses	Net gain/loss	Seats %	Votes %	Votes	+/−
Liberal Democrats	11	1	0	+1	57.9	52.1	28,588	+25.1
Conservative	7	2	1	+1	36.8	41.3	22,691	-24.5
Independent	1	0	2	-2	5.3	5.6	3,049	+2.6
BNP	0	0	0	0	0.0	1.0	569	-1.0

== Ward results ==
Bilton
Party	Candidate	Votes	%	±%
Liberal Democrats	Clare McKenzie	1,662	53.9	+4.5
Conservative	Robin Adderley	1,241	40.2	−4.3
BNP	Emma Utley	181	5.9	+5.9
Majority		421	13.7	+8.8
Turnout		3,084	71.6	+24.7
Liberal Democrats hold		Swing		

Granby
Party	Candidate	Votes	%	±%
Liberal Democrats	John Fox	1,959	70.7	+4.7
Conservative	Benjamin Johnson	812	29.3	+8.1
Majority		1,147	41.4	−3.4
Turnout		2,771	61.2	+29.5
Liberal Democrats hold		Swing		

Harlow Moor
Party	Candidate	Votes	%	±%
Conservative	Donald MacKenzie	1,747	59.2	−2.8
Liberal Democrats	Howard Cohen	1,204	40.8	+7.5
Majority		543	18.4	−10.3
Turnout		2,951	71.3	+30.5
Conservative hold		Swing		

High Harrogate
Party	Candidate	Votes	%	±%
Liberal Democrats	Amanda Russell	1,612	57.2	+22.6
Conservative	Lydia Blakeley	1,207	42.8	−11.2
Majority		405	14.4	
Turnout		2,819	63.9	+29.4
Liberal Democrats gain from Conservative		Swing		

Hookstone
Party	Candidate	Votes	%	±%
Liberal Democrats	Patricia Marsh	2,139	65.0	−0.4
Conservative	Matthew Hill	1,150	35.0	+9.6
Majority		989	30.1	−9.9
Turnout		3,289	73.3	+31.4
Liberal Democrats hold		Swing		

Knaresborough East
Party	Candidate	Votes	%	±%
Liberal Democrats	Christine Willoughby	1,678	64.1	+19.0
Conservative	Helen McNamara	939	35.9	+12.0
Majority		739	28.2	+7.1
Turnout		2,617	67.1	+31.7
Liberal Democrats hold		Swing		

Knaresborough King James
Party	Candidate	Votes	%	±%
Liberal Democrats	Bill Hoult	1,732	58.8	+3.3
Conservative	Philip Ireland	1,216	41.2	+2.6
Majority		516	17.5	+0.5
Turnout		2,948	73.5	+26.1
Liberal Democrats hold		Swing		

Knaresborough Scriven Park
Party	Candidate	Votes	%	±%
Liberal Democrats	Anne Jones	1,700	58.9	+6.4
Conservative	Barrington Batt	1,187	41.1	+5.9
Majority		513	17.8	+0.5
Turnout		2,887	70.0	+33.0
Liberal Democrats hold		Swing		

Low Harrogate
Party	Candidate	Votes	%	±%
Conservative	John Ennis	1,355	50.1	−4.2
Liberal Democrats	Carol Brooks	1,349	49.9	+4.2
Majority		6	0.2	−8.4
Turnout		2,704	64.1	+25.8
Conservative hold		Swing		

New Park
Party	Candidate	Votes	%	±%
Liberal Democrats	Matthew Webber	1,677	63.3	−12.0
Conservative	Neil Bentley	973	36.7	+22.0
Majority		704	26.6	−34.0
Turnout		2,650	65.5	+30.1
Liberal Democrats hold		Swing		

Pannal
Party	Candidate	Votes	%	±%
Conservative	Sharon Bentley	1,944	55.9	−10.4
Liberal Democrats	Martin Eglese	1,536	44.1	+10.4
Majority		408	11.7	−20.8
Turnout		3,480	80.4	+29.1
Conservative hold		Swing		

Ripon Minster
Party	Candidate	Votes	%	±%
Conservative	Stuart Martin	861	35.3	+20.9
Independent	Pauline McHardy	807	33.1	−14.2
Liberal Democrats	Paul Freeman	665	27.3	+9.9
Independent	Jeremy Banyard	103	4.2	−7.2
Majority		54	2.2	
Turnout		2,436	60.9	+24.8
Conservative gain from Independent		Swing		

Ripon Moorside
Party	Candidate	Votes	%	±%
Independent	Andrew Williams	1,477	61.8	+0.4
Conservative	Anthony Simpson	476	19.9	+6.2
Liberal Democrats	Stephen Jones	438	18.3	+1.1
Majority		1,001	41.9	−2.4
Turnout		2,391	60.6	+21.9
Independent hold		Swing		

Ripon Spa
Party	Candidate	Votes	%	±%
Conservative	Alan Skidmore	1,197	43.6	+20.5
Liberal Democrats	John Stockdale	889	32.4	+3.3
Independent	Sylvia Brierley	480	17.5	−22.4
Independent	Kenneth Hart	182	6.6	+6.6
Majority		308	11.2	
Turnout		2,748	64.1	+24.7
Conservative gain from Independent		Swing		

Rossett
Party	Candidate	Votes	%	±%
Conservative	Robert Nash	2,055	55.2	−4.6
Liberal Democrats	Philomena Noonan	1,668	44.8	+7.0
Majority		387	10.4	−11.5
Turnout		3,723	77.7	+27.8
Conservative hold		Swing		

Saltergate
Party	Candidate	Votes	%	±%
Liberal Democrats	Michael Newby	1,591	57.1	+1.4
Conservative	Steven Jackson	1,196	42.9	+8.9
Majority		395	14.2	−7.5
Turnout		2,787	67.5	+32.3
Liberal Democrats hold		Swing		

Starbeck
Party	Candidate	Votes	%	±%
Liberal Democrats	Philip Broadbank	1,961	70.5	−1.7
Conservative	Dennis Pinchen	653	23.5	+10.5
BNP	Tracy-Ann Robinson	166	6.0	−3.7
Majority		1,308	47.1	−12.0
Turnout		2,780	63.1	+27.9
Liberal Democrats hold		Swing		

Stray
Party	Candidate	Votes	%	±%
Conservative	Clifford Trotter	1,708	53.2	−1.3
Liberal Democrats	Nicholas Anderson	1,503	46.8	+4.0
Majority		205	6.4	−5.4
Turnout		3,211	76.0	+31.3
Conservative hold		Swing		

Woodfield
Party	Candidate	Votes	%	±%
Liberal Democrats	Andrew Goss	1,625	62.0	+3.5
Conservative	Heather Adderley	774	29.5	+14.6
BNP	Steven Gill	222	8.5	−4.0
Majority		851	32.5	−11.2
Turnout		2,621	64.2	+25.5
Liberal Democrats hold		Swing		
