= Borough of Harrogate =

Former local government district in England

Coordinates: 53°59′25″N 1°32′28″W

- Non-metropolitan district and borough
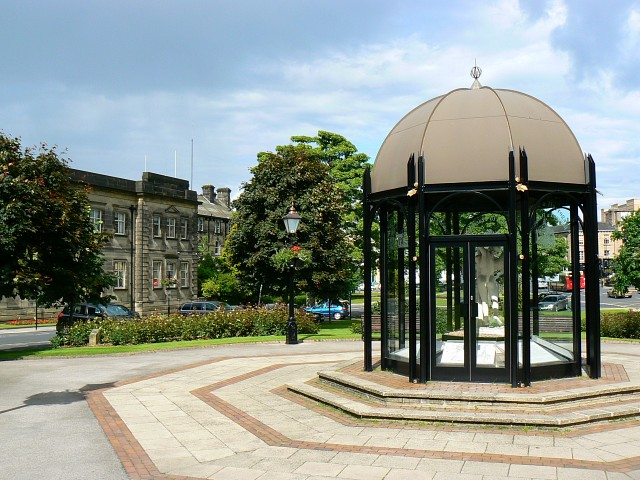
- Harrogate Council Offices

- Coat of arms Council logo

- Shown within North Yorkshire
- Sovereign state: United Kingdom
- Constituent country: England
- Region: Yorkshire and the Humber
- Ceremonial county: North Yorkshire
- Admin. HQ: Harrogate

Government
  - Type: Harrogate Borough Council
  - Leadership: Leader & Cabinet
  - Executive

Area
  - Total: 505 sq mi (1,308 km^{2})

Population (2021)
  - Total: 164,105
  - Density: 324.9/sq mi (125.5/km^{2})
- Time zone: UTC+0 (Greenwich Mean Time)
  - Summer (DST): UTC+1 (British Summer Time)
- ONS code: 36UD (ONS); E07000165 (GSS)
- Ethnicity: 96.9% White; 1.0% Mixed; 0.8% S.Asian; 0.8% Chinese or other 0.6% Black
- Website: Harrogate.gov.uk

The Borough of Harrogate was a local government district with borough status in North Yorkshire, England, from 1974 to 2023. Its council was based in the town of Harrogate, but it also included surrounding settlements, including the cathedral city of Ripon, and almost all of the Nidderdale Area of Outstanding Natural Beauty. At the 2011 Census, the borough had a population of 157,869.

The borough was abolished on 31 March 2023, and its functions were transferred to the new unitary North Yorkshire Council on 1 April 2023.

== History ==
The district was formed on 1 April 1974, under the Local Government Act 1972, as a merger of the Masham and Wath rural districts, and part of Thirsk, from the North Riding of Yorkshire, along with the boroughs of Harrogate and the city of Ripon, the Knaresborough urban district, Nidderdale Rural District, Ripon and Pateley Bridge Rural District, part of Wetherby Rural District and part of Wharfedale Rural District, all in the West Riding of Yorkshire. The district was abolished by Government reforms on 31 March 2023 after 49 years of existence.

The district was part of the Leeds City Region, and bordered seven other areas; the Craven, Richmondshire, Hambleton, Selby and York districts in North Yorkshire and the boroughs of Bradford and Leeds in West Yorkshire. It fell primarily within the HG, LS and YO postcode areas, while a small part of it was within the BD area.

It was the county's fourth largest district, as well the seventh largest non-metropolitan district in England. It was previously the county's second largest district until 1 April 1996, when the parishes of Nether Poppleton, Upper Poppleton, Hessay and Rufforth were transferred from the Borough of Harrogate to become part of the newly formed York unitary authority area. According to the 2001 census, these parishes had a population of 5,169.

=== Abolition ===
In July 2021 the Ministry of Housing, Communities and Local Government announced that in April 2023, the non-metropolitan county would be reorganised into a unitary authority. Harrogate Borough Council was abolished on 31 March 2023 and its functions were transferred on 1 April 2023 to a new single authority for the non-metropolitan county of North Yorkshire.

== Politics ==
Elections to the borough council were held in three out of every four years, with one third of the 54 seats on the council being elected at each election. After being under no overall control from the 2006 election, the Conservative party gained a majority at the 2010 election.

Following the 2016 United Kingdom local elections and subsequent by-elections, the political composition of Harrogate was as follows:

Year	Conservative	Liberal Democrat	Independent
2016	37	10	7

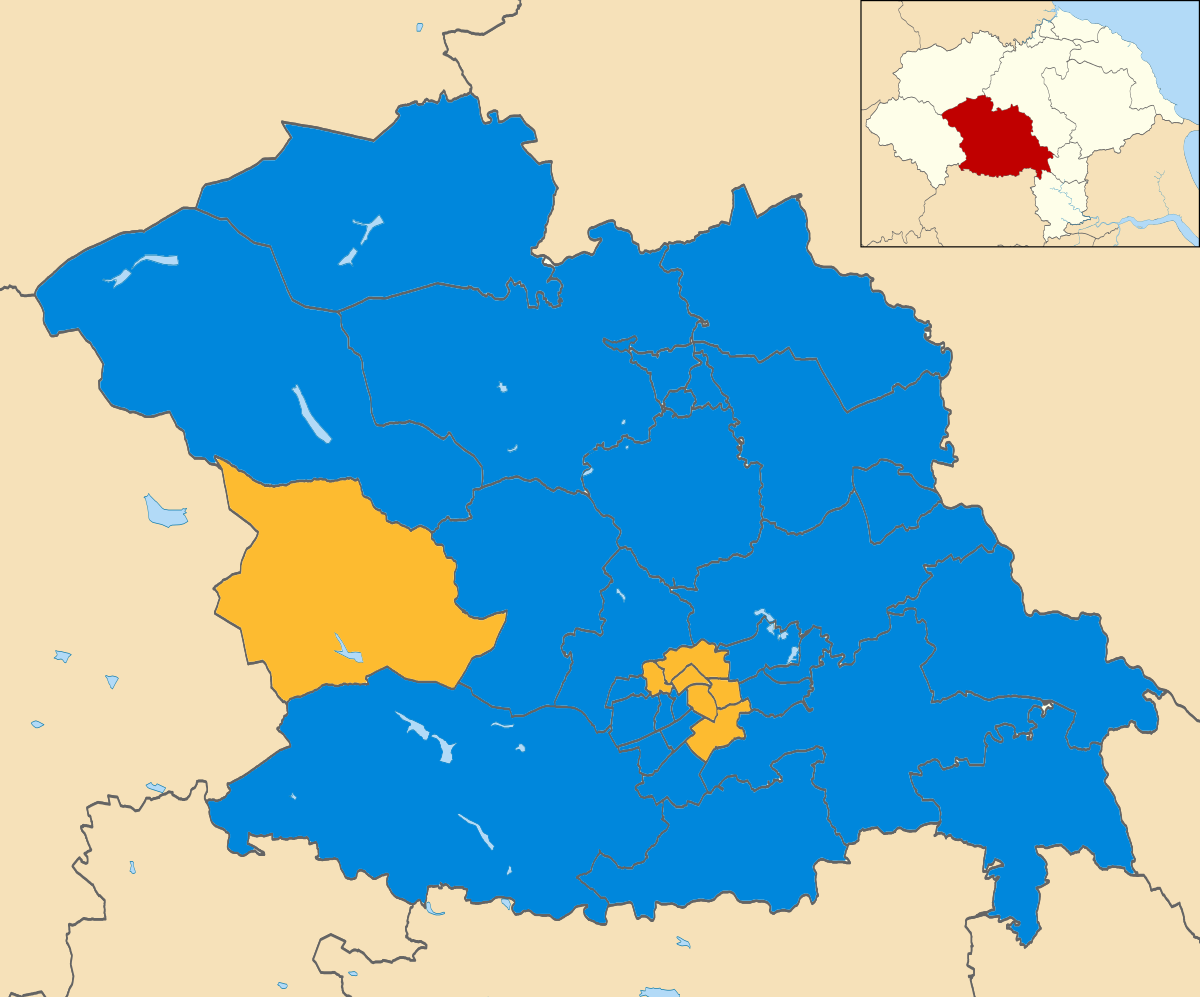
Harrogate District Council 2017

This was the last composition of the former 54 seat council, prior to boundary changes.

The composition of the new 40 seat council after boundary changes was as follows:

Year	Conservative	Liberal Democrat	Independent
2018	31	7	2

=== Parliamentary constituencies ===
The district was divided between three parliamentary constituencies: the whole of Harrogate and Knaresborough, the eastern part of Skipton and Ripon and the north western part of Selby and Ainsty.

== Towns ==
By population:
1. Harrogate
2. Ripon (city)
3. Knaresborough
4. Boroughbridge
5. Pateley Bridge
6. Masham

== Historical sites ==
- Aldborough Roman Museum
- Fountains Abbey
- Ripon Cathedral
- Knaresborough Castle
- Ripley Castle
- Spofforth Castle
- Marston Moor
- Devil's Arrows

== Freedom of the Borough ==
The following people and military units received the Freedom of the Borough of Harrogate.

=== Individuals ===
- David Simpson (1860–1931), the first honorary freeman of the Borough of Harrogate, in 1923.
- Edward Wood, 1st Earl of Halifax: 1926.
- Jonathan Wild: 18 July 2012.
- Jean MacQuarrie: October 2021.

=== Military units ===
- The Army Foundation College.
