= Harrogate Bus Company =

Transdev-owned bus operator

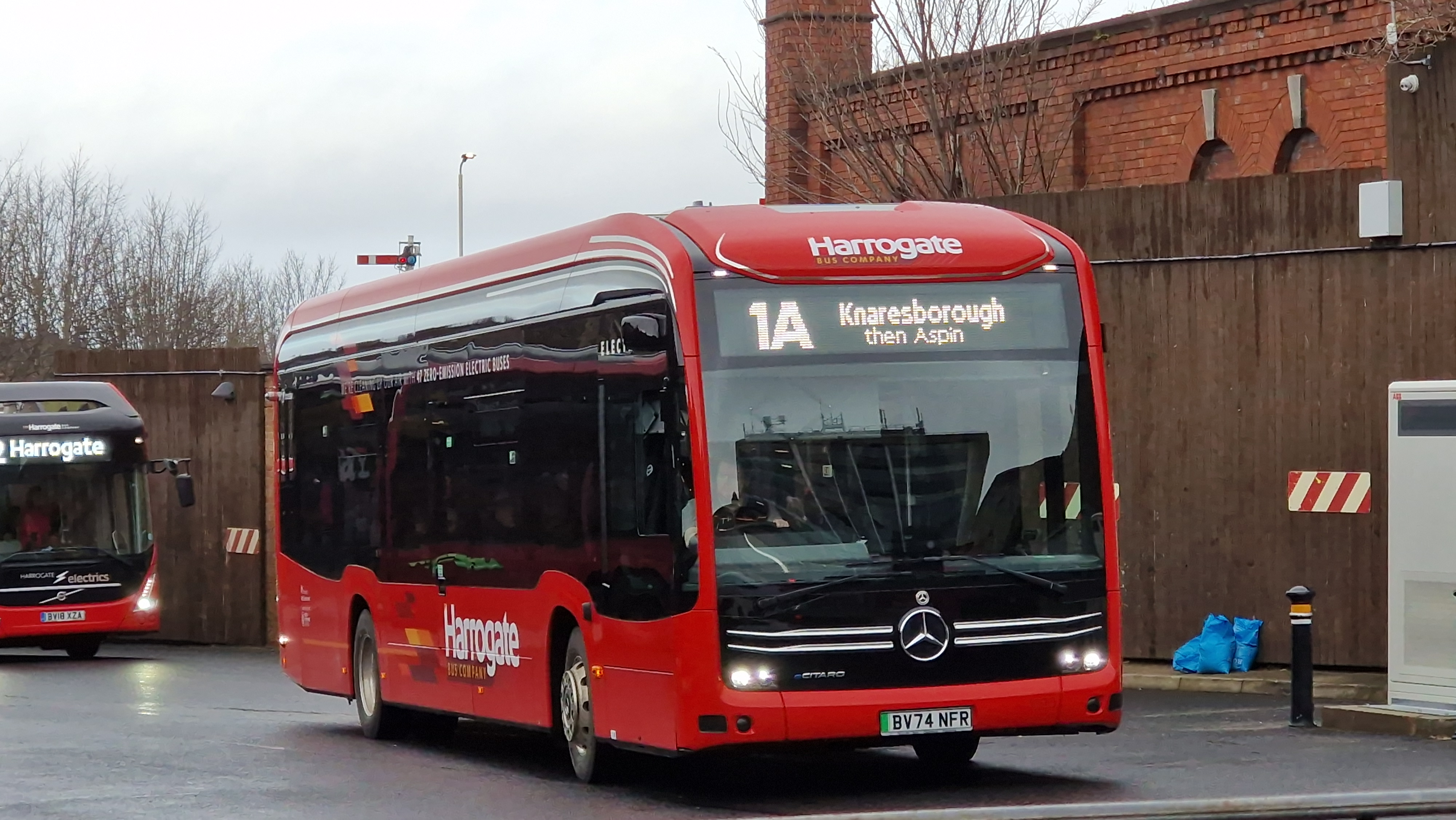
- Harrogate Bus Company Mercedes-Benz eCitaro battery electric bus at Harrogate bus station in December 2024
- Parent: Transdev Blazefield
- Founded: November 1906; 119 years ago
- Headquarters: Harrogate, North Yorkshire; England
- Service area: North Yorkshire; West Yorkshire
- Service type: Public transport
- Stations: Harrogate Bus Station Knaresborough Bus Station
- Fleet: 57 (as of June 2024)
- Managing Director: Henri Rohard
- Website: transdevbus.co.uk/the-harrogate-bus-company/

Harrogate Bus Company operates both local and regional bus services in North Yorkshire and West Yorkshire, England. It is a subsidiary of Transdev Blazefield.

== History ==
In November 1906, The Harrogate Road Car Company was formed. Initially operating steam-powered buses, the company adopted conventionally-fuelled petrol buses in 1911.

In 1924, the company was absorbed into Tilling & British Automobile Traction and renamed the Harrogate & District Road Car Company. Following the company's expansion, it was further renamed West Yorkshire Road Car Company in 1927, to reflect the wider service area provided.

In 1948, along with other companies that were then part of the Tilling Group, West Yorkshire Road Car Company was nationalised.

In 1968, West Yorkshire Road Car Company became a subsidiary of the National Bus Company.

In 1987, West Yorkshire Road Car Company was sold in a management buyout to the AJS Group, owned by former East Yorkshire Motor Services managing director, Alan Stephenson. The business was split into smaller companies in December 1988, one of which became Harrogate & District Travel.

Following the deregulation of bus services in 1986, Harrogate Independent Travel was set up by a number of West Yorkshire Road Car Company drivers, in a bid to challenge their former employer. The company was subsequently purchased by AJS Group in April 1989.

In August 1991, Harrogate & District Travel was included in the purchase of AJS Group by Blazefield Group, following the sale of seven of the company's eight remaining bus firms at the time – a deal valued at £2.2 million.

In October 1996, the company further expanded, following the transfer of Cowie Group's operations in the cathedral city of Ripon.

In April 2005, the company was awarded the contract to operate service 767, which ran between Harrogate and Leeds Bradford Airport. The contract was subsequently awarded to Dales & District in April 2010. The route is now served by the Flyer A2 service, operated by Transdev York & Country. It was introduced in September 2020, as part of a joint partnership between Leeds Bradford Airport, Transdev Blazefield and West Yorkshire Combined Authority.

In January 2006, French-based operator Transdev acquired the Blazefield Group, along with 305 vehicles.

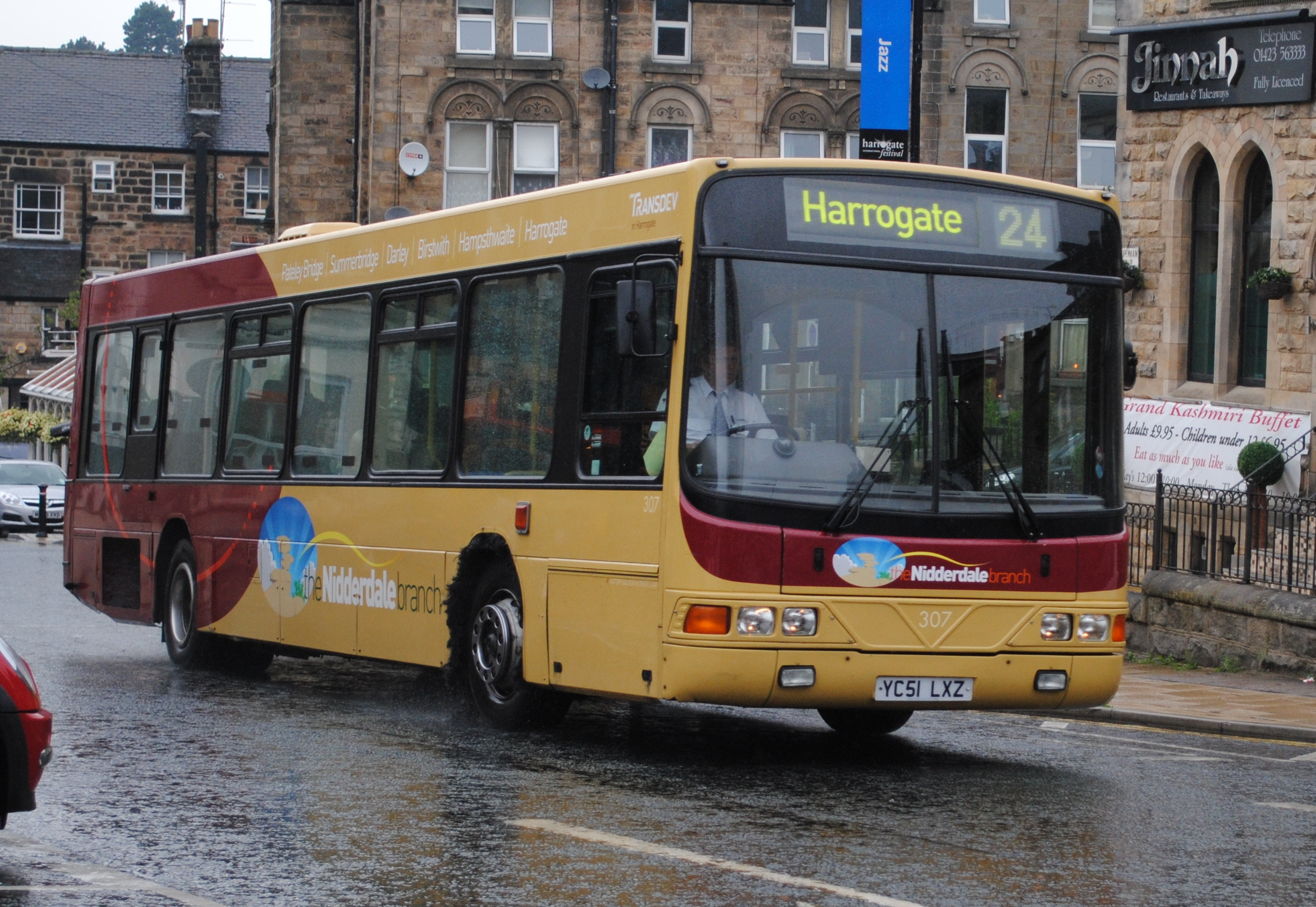
A Transdev in Harrogate Nidderdale Branch branded Wright Renown bodied Volvo B10BLE in Harrogate, operating service 24 in August 2011

In 2010, the company was rebranded under the name Transdev in Harrogate. As part of this, a new butterscotch and burgundy livery was introduced across the fleet, with the exception of the double-decker Wright Eclipse Gemini bodied Volvo B7TL vehicles dedicatedly branded for the company's Leeds to Harrogate and Ripon route 36, which received a revision to its original black, red and grey livery in 2009.

In 2011, the Wright Eclipse Gemini route 36 fleet underwent a refurbishment program. The route received a new identity – named ‘36 City Connect’ – and a new red and black livery was introduced, alongside the addition of new leather coach-style seats, and the introduction of a 2+1 seating arrangement behind the staircase upstairs. The buses were also fitted with new front fascias, as seen on their facelifted second generation model, and new powertrains.

The company also became involved in a bus war with local independent operator Connexionsbuses in 2011. It concerned bus services operating in and around the market town of Wetherby. In the same year, a retendering exercise by North Yorkshire County Council saw all of the company's council contracted routes transferred to other operators. An exception was service X59, which operated between Harrogate and Skipton via Bolton Abbey. Initially, the service was operated commercially and at a reduced frequency, prior to its eventual withdrawal in March 2013.

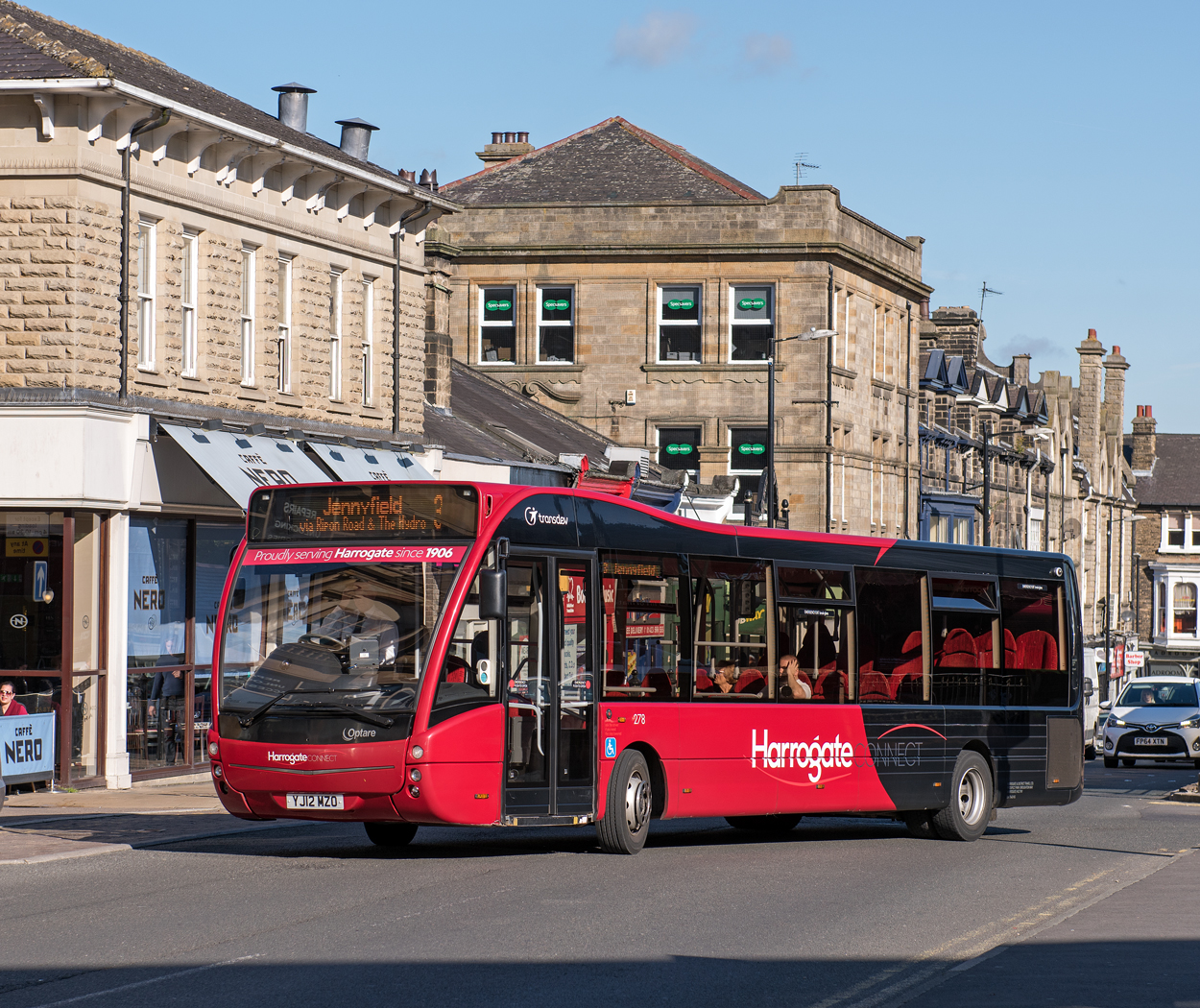
A Harrogate Connect branded Optare Versa in Harrogate, operating service 3 in September 2015

In 2012, the company introduced eight brand-new single-decker Optare Versa vehicles to serve local routes within Harrogate. These buses operated on routes 2 (to Bilton), 3 (to Jennyfield), and 6 (to Pannal Ash) under the new brand name Harrogate Connect, with the original butterscotch and burgundy livery being revised and replaced by a new red and black colour scheme. During 2013, the remainder of the fleet underwent a transformation. All services (except for the dedicatedly branded route 36) adopted the Harrogate Connect identity.

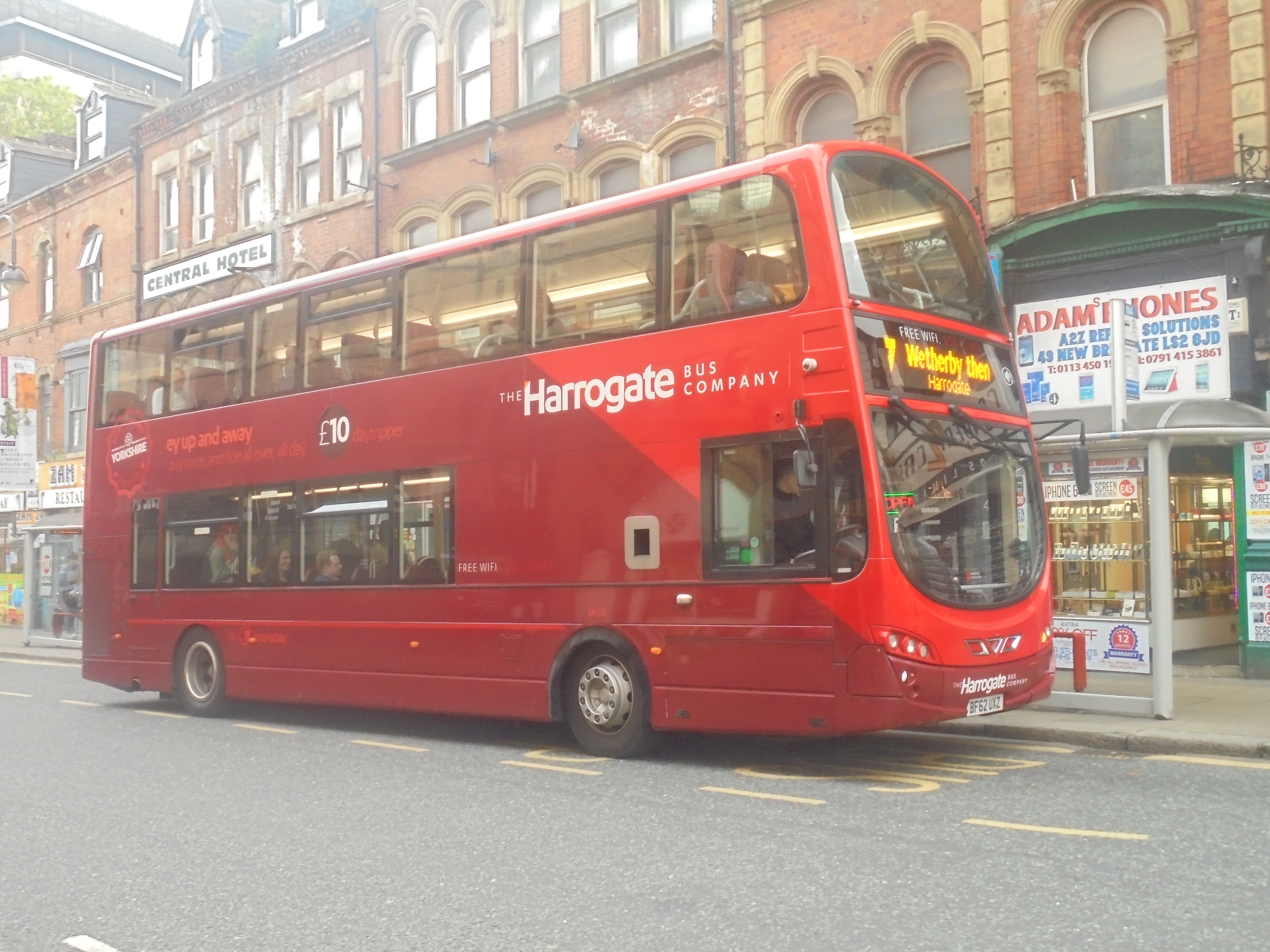
A Harrogate Bus Company branded Wright Eclipse Gemini 2 bodied Volvo B9TL in Leeds, operating service 7 in May 2018

In 2016, the company underwent a significant transformation. As part of this, the company rebranded as The Harrogate Bus Company, and initiated a fleet modernisation program. The first phase involved the delivery of fourteen brand new high-specification Wright Gemini 3 bodied Volvo B5TL double-decker buses for operation on route 36. These new buses replaced older Wright Eclipse Gemini vehicles, and the route received a new identity – named ‘Riding Redefined’ – along with a new two-tone red and black livery. The new fleet entered service in late January.

Later that year, a new two-tone red livery was also introduced for the standard fleet, and ten Wright Eclipse Urban bodied Volvo B7RLE single-deckers were refurbished for operation on route 1, including six existing buses and four new transfers from other Transdev subsidiaries. These, along with two Wright Eclipse Gemini bodied Volvo B7TL and B9TLs recently replaced from the 36 fleet, were upgraded with modern passenger amenities such as WiFi connectivity, USB charging capabilities and audio/visual next stop information, and were also fitted with superchargers to reduce NOx emissions. Additionally, the Eclipse Urbans were equipped with new front fascias, as seen on their facelifted second generation model. The refurbished Wright Eclipse Geminis entered service in June 2016, while the Eclipse Urbans entered service on route 1 on 17 July, replacing older Wright Renown bodied Volvo B10BLE single-deckers that were branded for the route.

In July 2017, a new brand was introduced for the route 770/771, resulting in the services being renumbered and rebranded as the “Superior 70/71”. The fleet underwent significant upgrades, with Wright Eclipse Urban 2 bodied Volvo B7RLE single-deck vehicles transferred from Transdev’s Burnley operations and refurbished to match the WiFi connectivity, USB charging capabilities, and audio/visual next stop information features as seen on the refurbished route 1 buses. On 23 July, the new fleet commenced service on the route, gradually replacing the entire existing fleet of Volvo B10BLE Wright Renown vehicles, which were phased out of service in Harrogate by 2018. However, in April 2018, due to the loss of council funding for the 70 to Connexionsbuses, the 71 was once again renumbered and rebranded, now operating as the “Simple 7".

In partnership with DalesBus, the service between Harrogate and Skipton was reintroduced in May 2021 – the first direct service between the two towns for eight years. (Note: The service was reintroduced as service 59.). Four return journeys operate every Saturday.

From 2 October 2022 services X98/X99 between Leeds and Wetherby were operated, following the withdrawal of First Leeds from these routes. However from 31 August 2025 these services were taken over by Procters, branded as Go-Ahead West Yorkshire.

In 2024/25, much of the fleet was converted to operation with battery-electric buses. Partially funded by the UK government's Zero Emission Bus Regional Areas (ZEBRA) scheme, 20 Mercedes-Benz eCitaro single-deck vehicles and 19 Alexander Dennis Enviro400EV double-deck vehicles – worth £21 million collectively – were ordered, with the first Enviro400EV revealed at an unveiling event in June. They entered service between late 2024 and early 2025 for the 36 and for other routes. The first five eCitaros entered service on 18 November 2024. As a result of the new vehicles arriving, the branding has changed from "The Harrogate Bus Company" to just "Harrogate Bus Company", dropping the "The" prefix.

2024 also saw the introduction of route 4, a service linking King Edwin Park housing estate with Harrogate. In October 2024, route 1D to The Pastures estate of Knaresborough was merged with the Carmires route 1C.

== Services and branding ==
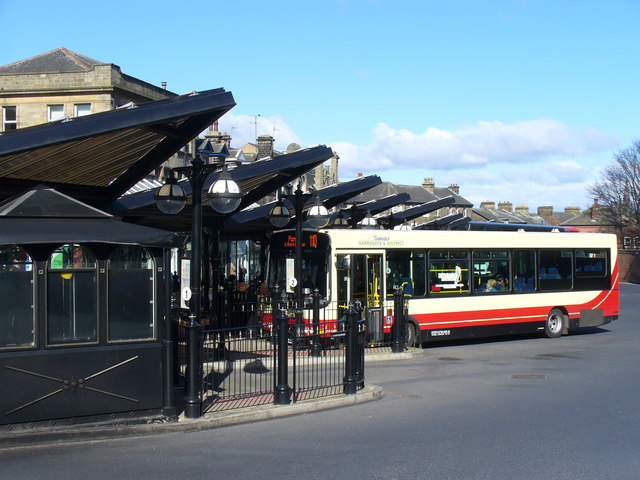
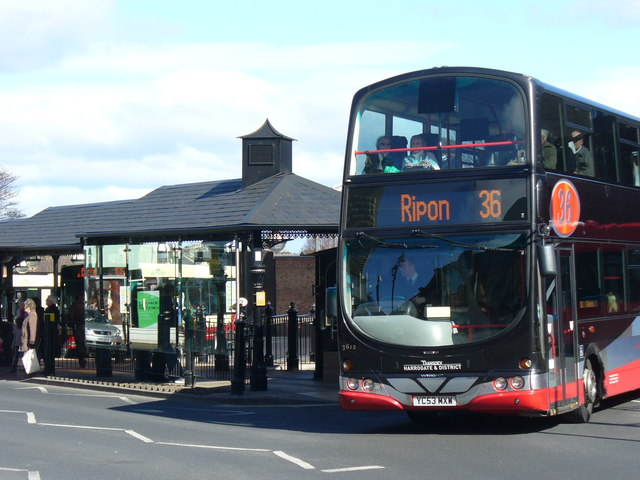
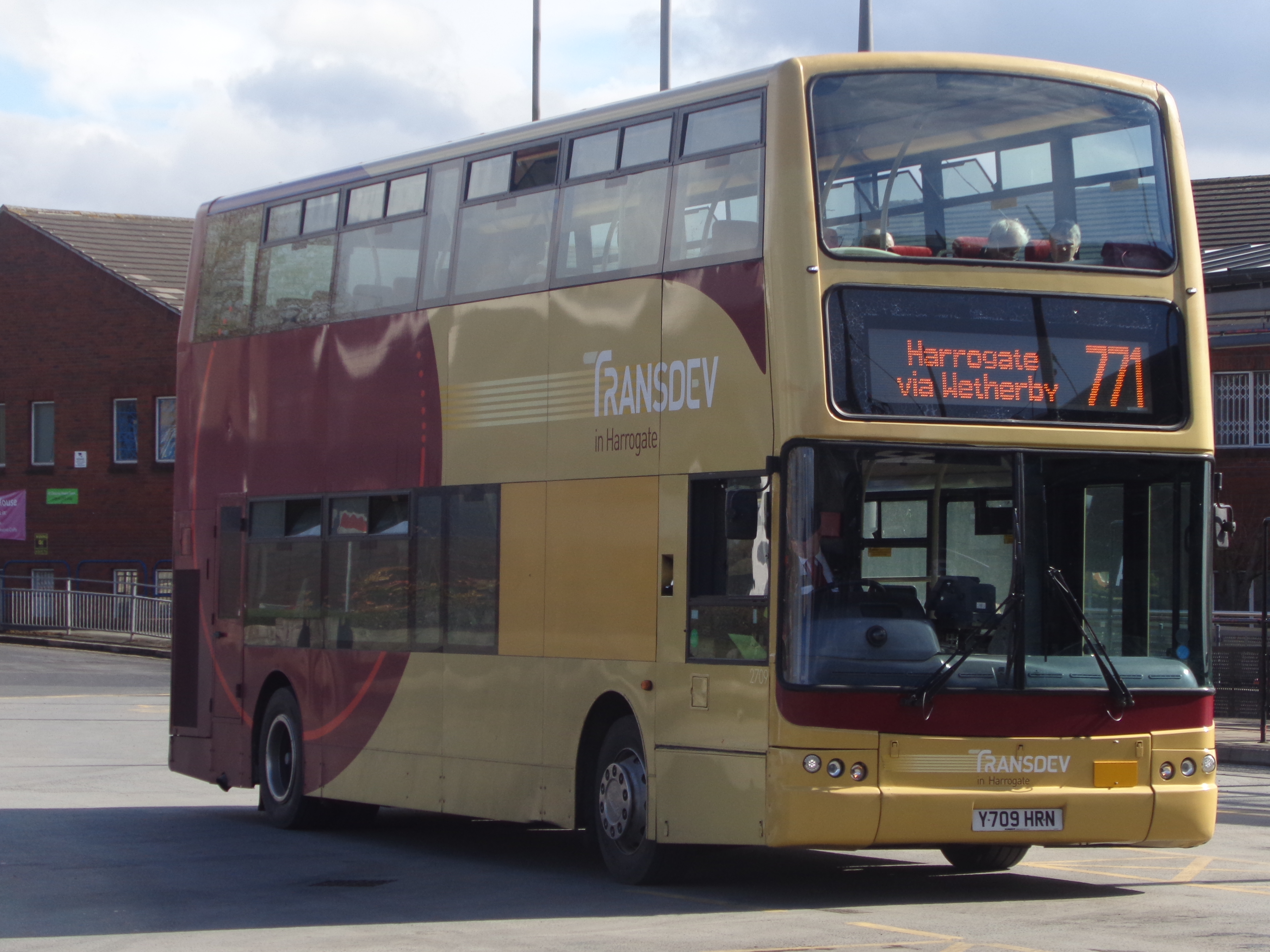
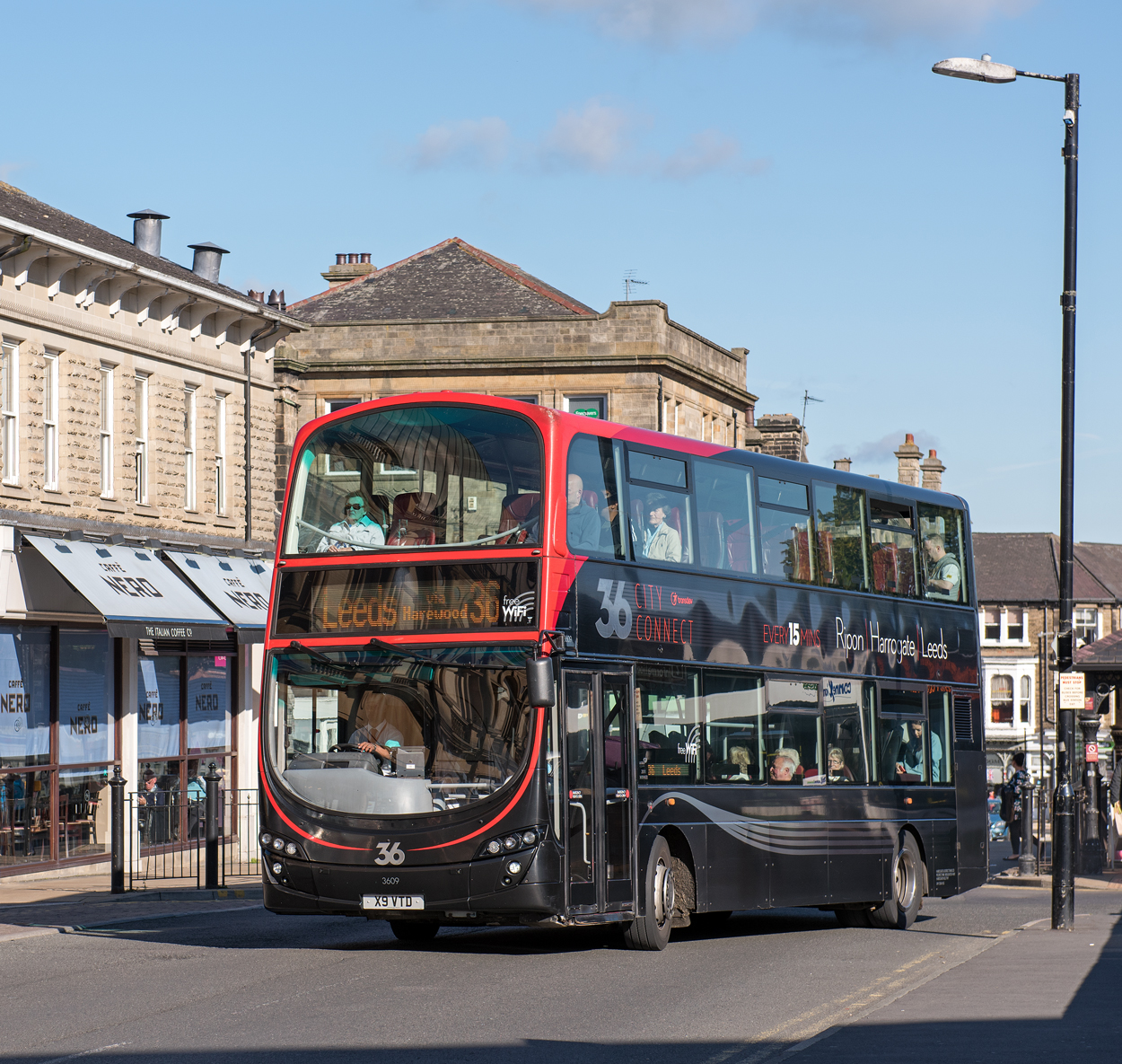
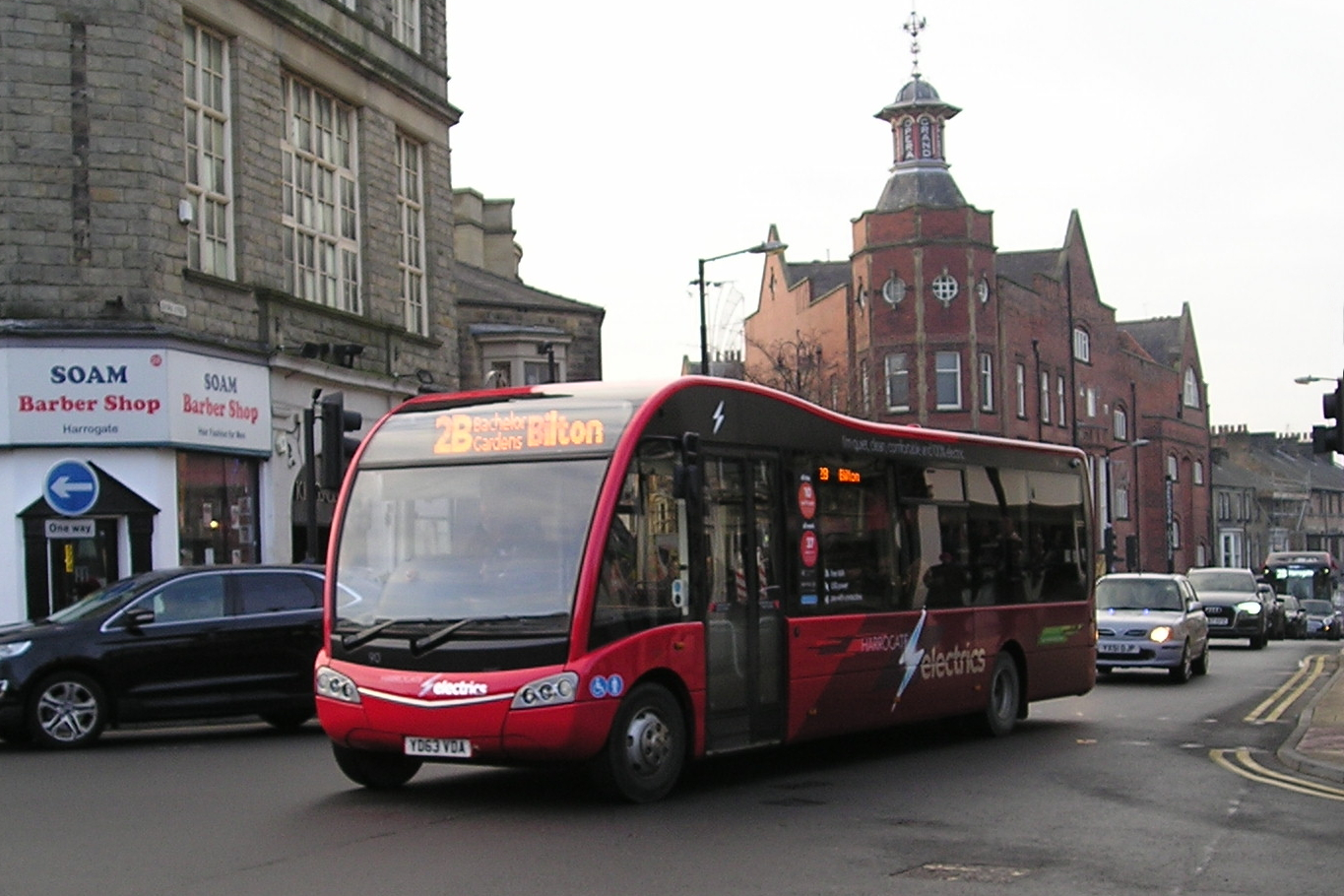
A selection of historic buses and liveries

=== The Harrogate Bus Company ===
Following the rebrand of the company in 2016, a two-tone red livery was introduced for local bus services in and around the spa town of Harrogate. As well as serving as a corporate livery, it was also used as a base for dedicated route brands such as the 1, the 7, and the Harrogate Electrics network.

In November 2024, the Harrogate Bus Company brand underwent a refresh. As part of this, a fleet of battery-electric Mercedes-Benz eCitaros were introduced, replacing the company's diesel powered Wright Eclipse vehicles. Additionally, a new logo and standard red livery was adopted, and dedicated route-specific branding for routes 1 and 7 was discontinued.

Alongside routes 1, 7 and Harrogate Electrics network, the company operates several other services including the 21 (Knaresborough to Boroughbridge and Roecliffe), the 24 (Harrogate to Pateley Bridge) and the 59 (Harrogate to Skipton, previously the X59).

=== Harrogate Electrics ===
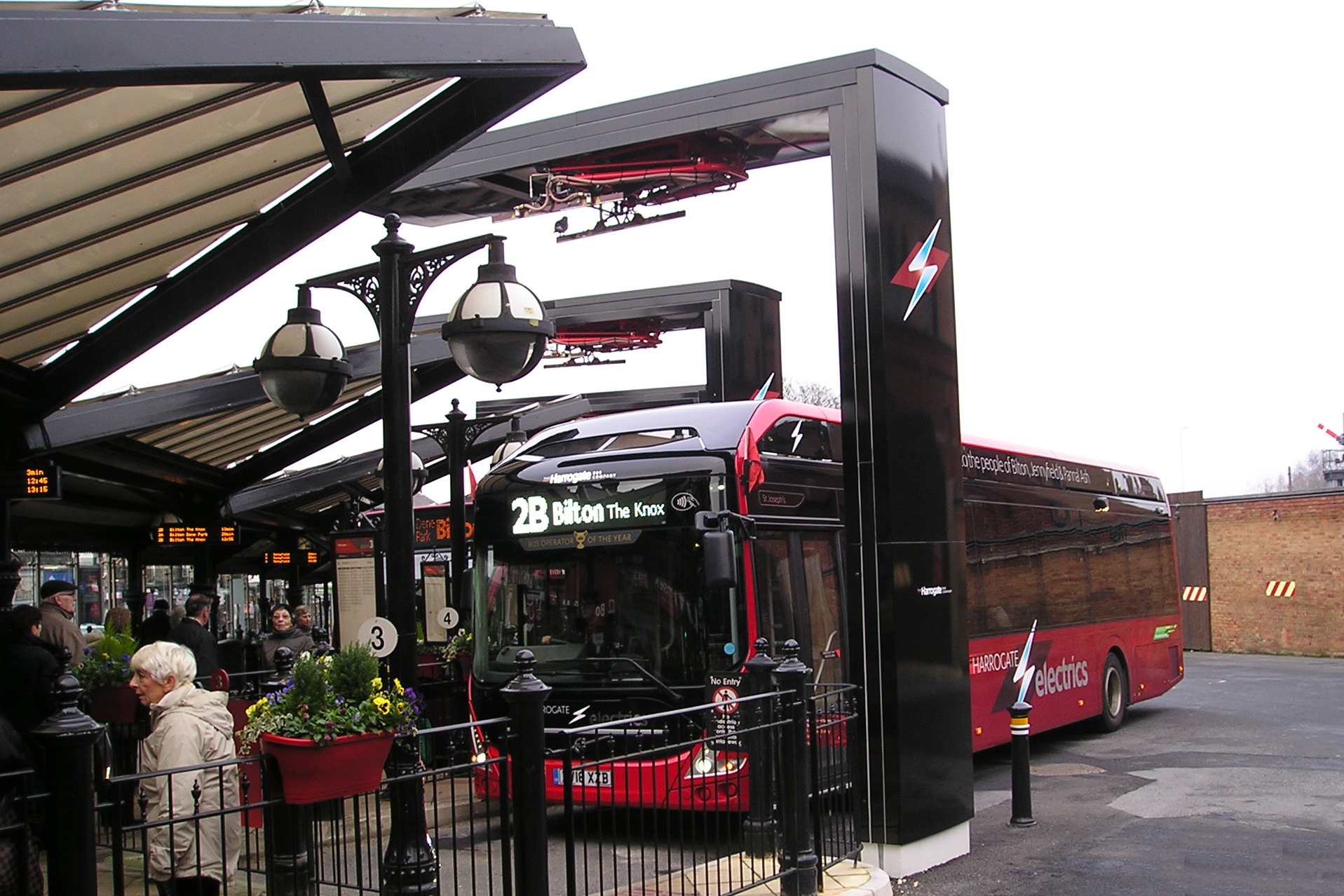
A Harrogate Electrics branded Volvo 7900e at Harrogate Bus Station, in January 2019

Local services operating in and around Harrogate were first electrified by a fleet of eight high-specification, battery-electric Volvo 7900 single-deck vehicles in dedicated branding. The vehicles, which were announced in February 2017, were introduced into service in July 2018. The project was funded partly by Transdev (£1.7 million), with a further £2.25 million of funding granted from the Government's Low Emission Bus Scheme. Features included free WiFi, USB charging and audio-visual next-stop announcements. These buses were withdrawn from service during 2025, largely being replaced by the fleet of Mercedes-Benz eCitaros.

The Harrogate Electrics network encompasses the company's local routes within Harrogate – the 2 to Bilton, the 3 to Jennyfield, the 4 to King Edwin Park, and the 6 to Pannal Ash and Beckwith Knowle Business Park. The 2 and 3 operate at a frequency of every 20 minutes, the 4 operates every hour, and the 6 operates every 30 minutes.

In October 2018, the 24 to Pateley Bridge became mainly electric-bus operated, with 2 battery-electric Optare Solo SR EVs branded in the Harrogate Electrics livery allocated for the route, however these buses have since been withdrawn from use and sold to the Big Lemon. As of 2025, many journeys on this route are provided by Mercedes-Benz eCitaros.

=== The1 ===
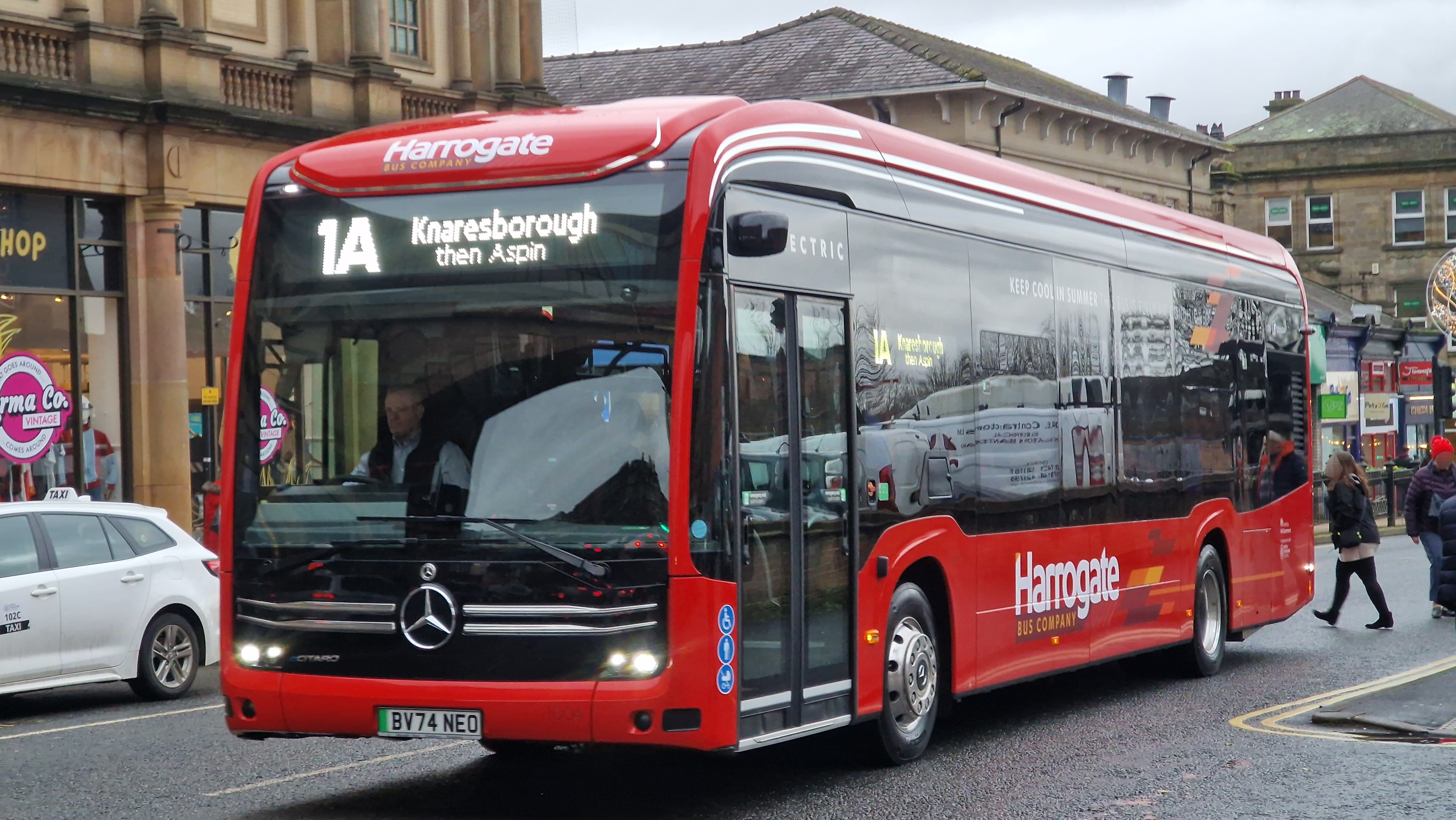
Mercedes-Benz eCitaro on route 1A in Harrogate in December 2024

The 1 brand encompasses a group of routes (1, 1A, 1B and 1C), which operate between Harrogate and Knaresborough via Starbeck. Routes operate at a combined ten minute frequency between Harrogate and Knaresborough, with services extending at a reduced frequency to housing estates within Knaresborough – Aspin (1A), Eastfield (1B), and Carmires/The Pastures (1C). The non-suffixed route 1 serves Harrogate, Starbeck, and Knaresborough only.

Since November 2024, services are operated by a fleet of Mercedes-Benz eCitaros in a red livery. Features include free WiFi, USB charging and audio-visual next-stop information.

=== The7 ===
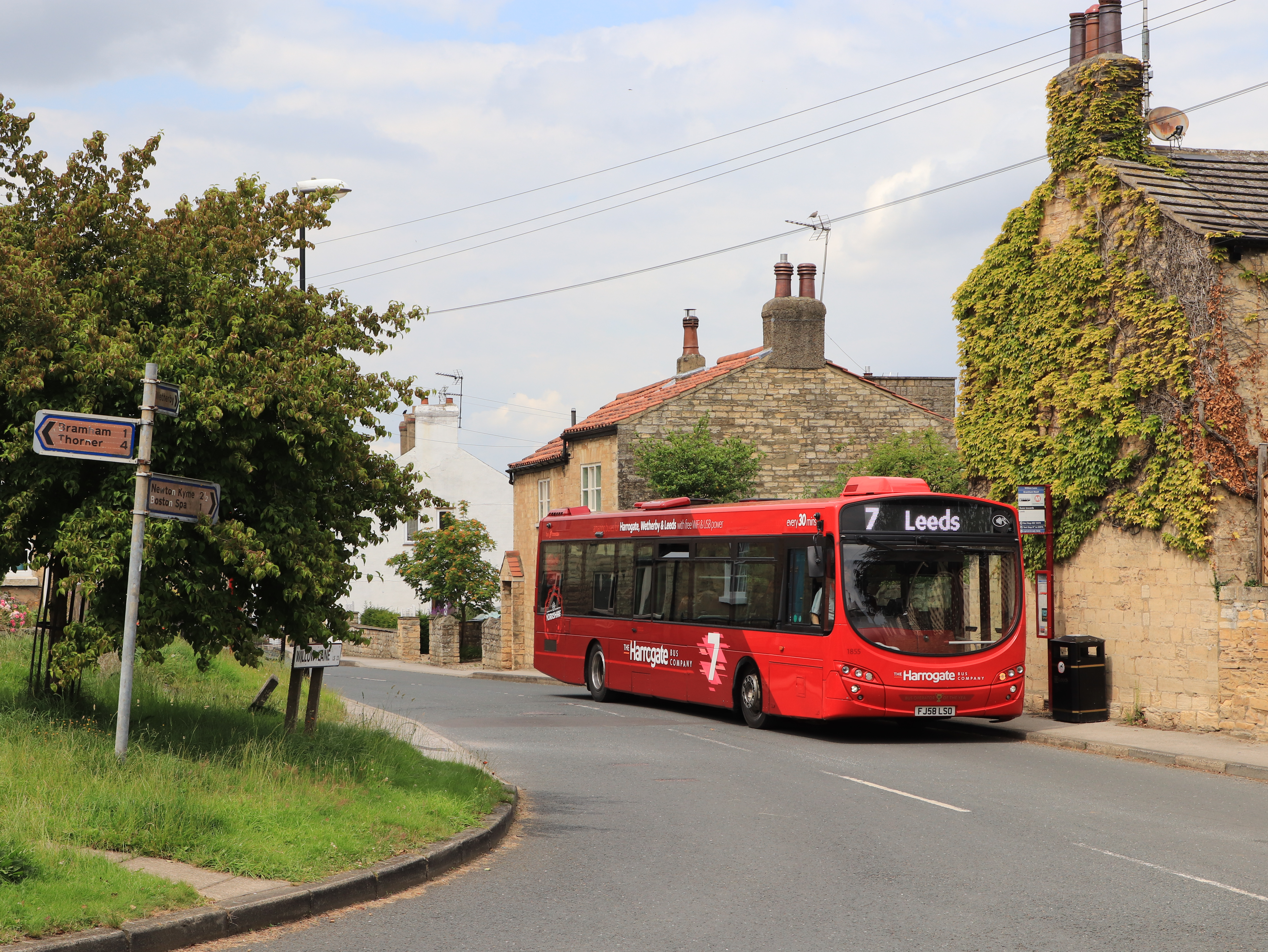
A route 7 branded Wright Eclipse Urban 2 in Clifford in July 2019

The 7 runs between Harrogate and Leeds via Wetherby, Boston Spa and Seacroft at an hourly frequency.

Since December 2024, services are operated by a fleet of Mercedes-Benz eCitaros in a red livery. Features include free WiFi, USB charging and audio-visual next-stop information.

=== The36 / 36 Electric ===
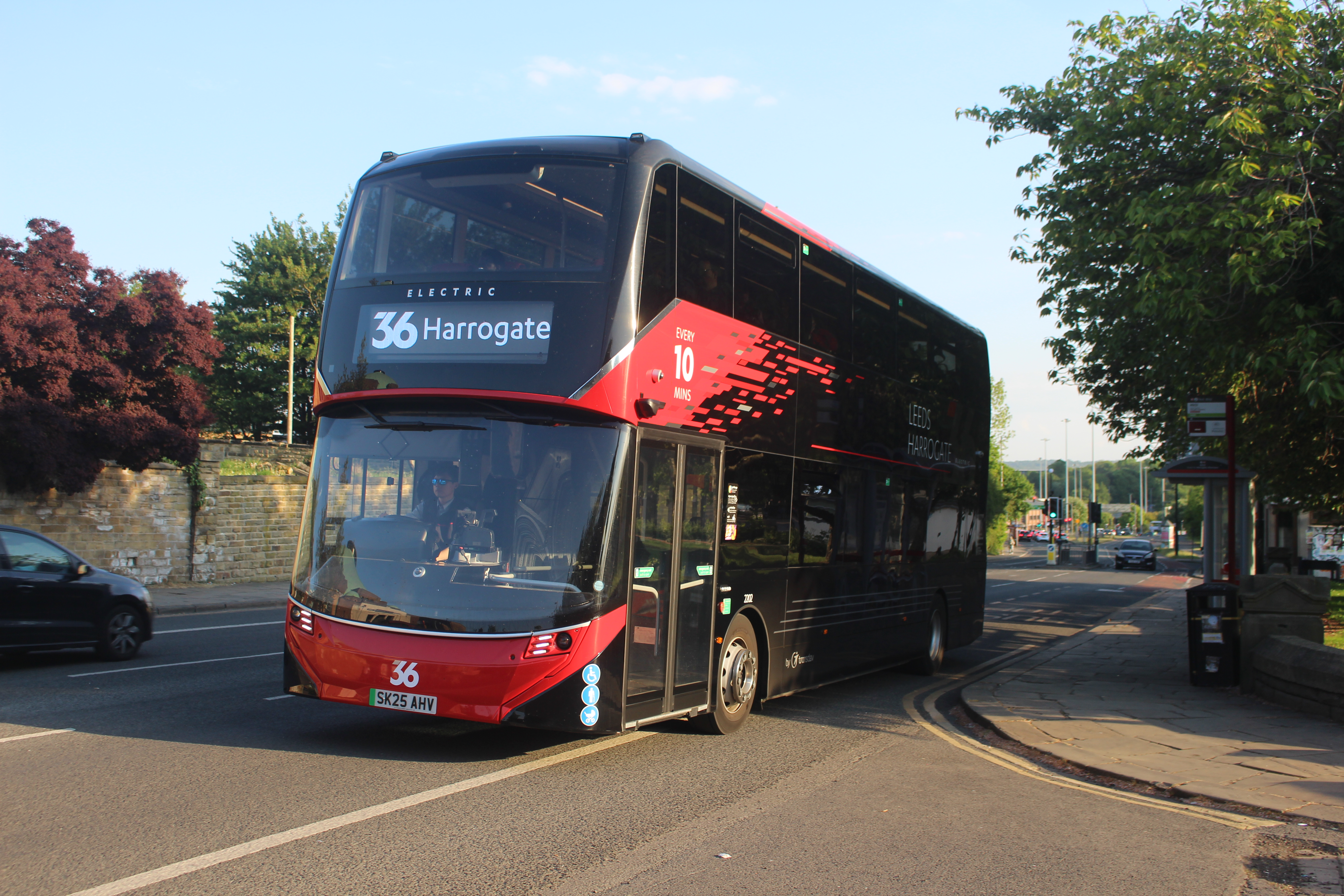
A route 36 branded Alexander Dennis Enviro400EV in Harrogate in May 2025

The 36 is one of the group's flagship services, running between Leeds and Harrogate via Harewood up to every ten minutes, and extending to Ripon via Ripley every 30 minutes.

Services are operated by a fleet of high-specification Alexander Dennis E400EV double-deck vehicles, dedicatedly branded for the route in a two-tone black and red livery. Features include free WiFi, USB charging, coach-style seating with a 2+1 arrangement upstairs, an on-board library and audio-visual next stop information.

== Fleet and operations ==
=== Depots ===
The former West Yorkshire Road Car Company depot at Grove Park in Harrogate was sold for redevelopment in the early 1990s. Following which Harrogate & District Travel operated from two depots; minibuses being based at Camwal Road in Starbeck and conventional buses at Manse Lane in Knaresborough.

Both depots soon became too small to accommodate an increasing fleet and the former Vibroplant depot on Prospect Road in Starbeck was purchased. The whole fleet was then operated from a single site, with the exception of one vehicle that remained out-stationed at Upper Nidderdale High School in Pateley Bridge.

As of June 2024, the company continues to operate from the single depot on Prospect Road in Starbeck.

=== Vehicles ===
As of June 2024, the fleet consists of 57 diesel-powered and battery-electric single and double-deck buses, manufactured by Mercedes-Benz, Optare, Volvo, Wrightbus/Volvo, and East Lancs/Scania.
