= Listed buildings in Harrogate (Bilton Ward) =

Bilton is a ward in the town of Harrogate, North Yorkshire, England. It contains 13 listed buildings that are recorded in the National Heritage List for England. Of these, one is listed at Grade II*, the middle of the three grades, and the others are at Grade II, the lowest grade. The ward is a suburb of the town, to the northeast of its centre. It is largely residential, although the part of it to the northeast of the railway is rural. The listed buildings include houses and cottages, former farmhouses and farm buildings, a public house, a former school, a church, its former hall and vicarage, and a lamp post.

== Key ==
Grade	Criteria
II*	Particularly important buildings of more than special interest
II	Buildings of national importance and special interest

== Buildings ==
Name and location	Photograph	Date	Notes	Grade
Gardeners Arms; 54.01415°N 1.51981°W		Early 18th century	The public house is in gritstone, and has a stone slate roof with coped gables and kneelers. There are two storeys and two bays. The central doorway has an architrave and a bracketed hood, and the windows are mullioned with three lights, and contain sashes.	II
Gardener's Arms Cottages; 54.01402°N 1.52124°W		Early 18th century	A terrace of three cottages in gritstone, with a Welsh slate roof, a stone ridge and kneelers. There are two storeys, each cottage has one bay, and on the right is an outshut. The doorways have chamfered reveals, and above the main doorway is a dated plaque. The windows are Yorkshire casements with chamfered heads and sills.	II
2 Bachelor Gardens; 54.01072°N 1.54084°W	—	Early to mid 18th century	The cottage is in gritstone, and has a Welsh slate roof with coped gables and kneelers. There are two storeys and two bays, with the gable end facing the road. The doorway has a plain surround, and the windows are horizontally-sliding sashes.	II
Red Cat Cottage; 54.01062°N 1.54086°W	—	Early to mid 18th century	The cottage is in gritstone, and has a Welsh slate roof with coped gables and kneelers. There are two storeys and three bays, with the gable end facing the road. Most of the windows are slightly recessed sashes.	II
Barn west of Gardener's Arms; 54.01423°N 1.52019°W		18th century	The barn is in gritstone, partly rendered, and has a roof of stone slate and pantile, with coped gables and kneelers. It contains a cart entrance with an arched head, two doorways and two windows.	II
Knox House Farmhouse; 54.01155°N 1.54246°W	—	Late 18th century	The farmhouse is in gritstone, and has a Welsh slate roof with coped gables and kneelers. There are two storeys and two bays. The central doorway and the windows, which are sashes, have plain lintels marked as gauged arches.	II
Barn north of Knox House Farmhouse; 54.01177°N 1.54225°W	—	Late 18th century	The barn is in gritstone, and has a Welsh slate roof with coped gables and kneelers. It contains an entrance that has a segmental-arched head with gauged voussoirs.	II
Prospect House; 54.01558°N 1.51934°W	—	Late 18th century	The house is in red brick, with stone dressings, and a stone slate roof with coped gables and kneelers. There are two storeys and two bays, a lower two-bay extension to the west, and a single-bay extension to the east. On the front is a gabled porch, above which is a blocked window, and the other windows are sashes with gauged flat red brick arches and keystones.	II
Former endowed school 54.01308°N 1.53647°W		1793	The school, later a private house, is in gritstone, and has a stone slate roof with gable kneelers. There are two storeys and five bays. The central doorway has a fanlight, above it is an inscribed plaque, and the windows are sashes. South of the building is a low wall containing a round-arched doorway with pilasters, an archivolt, and a keystone.	II
St Johns Church Hall; 54.00784°N 1.53733°W		c. 1847	The church hall is in gritstone, with gabled buttresses, and a green slate roof with coped gables and kneelers. It is in Perpendicular style. There is a single storey and five bays, the middle bay a projecting gabled porch. The windows are mullioned and transomed, and in the east gable end is a carved dated coat of arms. On the centre of the roof is a wooden flèche with a lead dome.	II
Lamp post 54.00771°N 1.53660°W		Mid 19th century	The lamp post on the east side of the road leading to St John's Church is in cast iron. It has a standard with trefoil arcading and ladder bars, and originally had a Windsor lantern.	II
Former Regional Library; 54.00769°N 1.53609°W		Mid 19th century	The vicarage, later used for other purposes, is in gritstone, and has a green slate roof with coped gables. There are two storeys and three bays, the outer bays are gabled, the right bay projects and is larger. In the middle bay is a projecting portico containing an arched doorway with a fanlight, and a parapet with stylised foliage bracketing. The upper floor windows have two lights and recessed arches, The ground floor windows have mullions, and in the left return is a splayed bay window.	II
St John's Church; 54.00824°N 1.53681°W		1851–57	The church, designed by George Gilbert Scott, is in gritstone, with stone dressings in a contrasting colour, and a green slate roof with corbelled eaves. It consists of a nave with a clerestory, north and south aisles, a south porch, a chancel and a west tower. The aisle windows are lancets, in the clerestory are two-light windows, and at the east end are three tall lancets.	II*
