= Nidd Viaduct =

Railway viaduct in North Yorkshire, England

Coordinates: 54.0203°N 1.5329°W

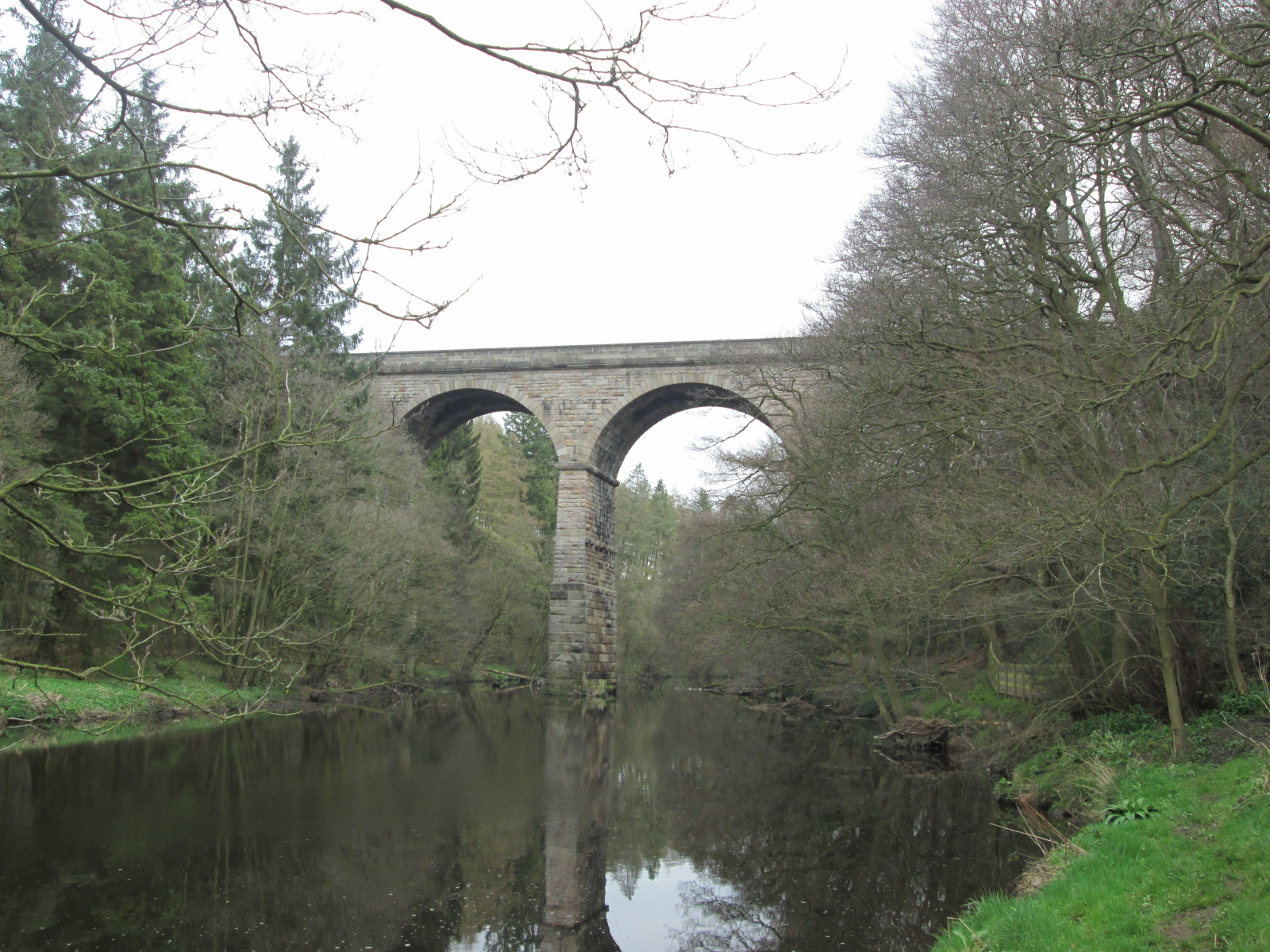
The viaduct, in 2014

The Nidd Viaduct, also known as the Bilton Viaduct, is a former railway bridge in Bilton (just north of Harrogate), a village in North Yorkshire, northern England. It crosses the River Nidd and its gorge. It opened in 1847 and closed to trains in the 1960s. It is now a listed building and carries a cycling trail.

== History ==
In 1845, the Leeds and Thirsk Railway received permission in the Leeds and Thirsk Railway Act 1845 (8 & 9 Vict. c. civ) to construct a line north from Leeds Wellington railway station to Thirsk railway station. At Bilton, the line had to cross the Nidd Gorge, and work on a viaduct started in 1846, designed by John Cass Birkinshaw. It was constructed of gritstone slabs quarried from the side of the gorge. The viaduct was completed in 1847, and the first train crossed it in 1848. The line closed in 1969, but the viaduct was retained. It was designated a Grade II listed building in May 1987, giving it legal protection. It now carries the Nidderdale Greenway cycle route and is maintained by Sustrans as part of the National Cycle Network.

== Description ==
The viaduct crosses the River Nidd. It is built of ashlar and gritstone in large, coursed blocks. It consists of seven round arches, three of which cross the river and each spanning 50 feet (15 metres). The piers are in two halves, tapering at the top half, and retain the corbels which were used for the centring during construction. They have rusticated quoins. The arches spring from prominent imposts and have massive stepped voussoirs. There are moulded bands at the impost and a roll cornice at track level. The parapet has flat moulding, and the end piers have projecting coping. The viaduct reaches a maximum height of 104 feet (32 metres) and is 448 feet (137 m) long.

== See also ==
- Listed buildings in Harrogate (Killinghall Ward)
