= Listed buildings in Harrogate (Killinghall Ward) =

Killinghall is a ward in the town of Harrogate, North Yorkshire, England. It contains two listed buildings that are recorded in the National Heritage List for England. Both the listed buildings are designated at Grade II, the lowest of the three grades, which is applied to "buildings of national importance and special interest". The parish is a rural area to the north of the town, and the listed buildings consist of a former packhorse bridge and a railway viaduct.

== Buildings ==
| Name and location | Photograph | Date | Notes |
|---|---|---|---|
| Spruisty Bridge; 54.01501°N 1.55166°W | | 17th or 18th century | A packhorse bridge over Oak Beck, it is in stone with modern concrete footing, and consists of a single slightly pointed arch. The bridge has a plain parapet and end piers with pyramidal caps. |
| Nidd Viaduct; 54.02019°N 1.53273°W | | 1847 | The viaduct was built by the Leeds and Thirsk Railway to carry its line over the River Nidd at Nidd Gorge. It is in gritstone, and consists of seven round arches, three of them over the river. The piers have plinths and rusticated quoins. The arches have massive voussoirs, and there are moulded bands at impost and track levels. The parapet has flat moulding, and the end piers have projecting coping. |
