= Killinghall =

Village and civil parish in North Yorkshire, England

Coordinates: 54°01′22″N 1°33′50″W

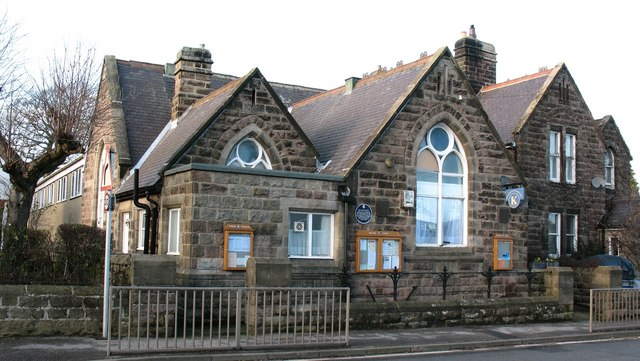
- The village hall in Killinghall

- Location within North Yorkshire
- Population: 4,132 (2011 census)
- OS grid reference: SE285585
- Civil parish: Killinghall
- Unitary authority: North Yorkshire
- Ceremonial county: North Yorkshire
- Region: Yorkshire and the Humber
- Country: England
- Sovereign state: United Kingdom
- Post town: HARROGATE
- Postcode district: HG3
- Dialling code: 01423
- Police: North Yorkshire
- Fire: North Yorkshire
- Ambulance: Yorkshire
- UK Parliament: Harrogate and Knaresborough

Killinghall is a village and civil parish in the county of North Yorkshire, England. The civil parish population taken at the 2011 census was 4,132.

The village is situated approximately 3 miles (5 km) north of Harrogate, extending south from the bridges on the A61 road over the River Nidd. The undeveloped area between Killinghall and Harrogate is known as Killinghall Moor some of which has been developed into Jenny Fields Estate. The village of Ripley lies 1 mile (1.6 km) to the north and Hampsthwaite 2 miles (3.2 km) to the west. Killinghall's position on the A61 links the village to Harrogate and Ripon. Harrogate bus route 36 between Ripon, Harrogate and Leeds stops in Killinghall.

Until 1974 it was part of the West Riding of Yorkshire. From 1974 to 2023 it was part of the Borough of Harrogate, it is now administered by the unitary North Yorkshire Council.

Killinghall is primarily a commuter village, currently without a public house, the Three Horseshoes and the Greyhound pub have closed, with the former set for demolition and converted into a local convenience store. Within the parish, but outside the village is one other: Old Spring Well - formerly the Travellers' Rest, with a second, The Nelson Inn, just outside the boundary, Killinghall CE Primary School, the Church of St Thomas, Killinghall Methodist Church, a children's day nursery, doctor's office and a garden centre with nursery. The local area incorporates a number of farms.

== History ==
The village dates back before the Norman conquest of England, in fact, there is evidence that it dates back to Celtic times. In the Domesday Book the village is called Chenihalle, i.e. Kennelhall; probably a place where the hounds (which belonged to the Lord of the Manor) were kept. A nobleman in the county of Yorkshire had the power granted to him by one of the Saxon kings to keep Mastiff dogs for chasing wolves out of their territory. The name has also been suggested as deriving from Chillingehal, which means the place of Cylla's people in Old English.

In the 17th century, early settlers acquired land in the Hollins Hall site of Lund Lane. Known at that time as Yearwith Hollins, this was settled by 25 families; the site was chosen because it was inter common with Killinghall and Hampsthwaite, which meant it was not possessed by either village. The Yeoman held plots of land of various sizes between Hollins Hall and Hollins Farm and records show that five of the families were named Hardisty. These early settlements helped create the village. There were also rich families that used to live in the village such as the Pulleyns, Tancreds, and Bayns who all erected manor houses that have since been reduced to grassy steps, and sometimes built over.

During the English Civil War, after the Battle of Marston Moor in July 1644, Cromwell's Norwich Troop of horses were quartered at Killinghall Village. The oldest building in the area is the Kennel Hall farm. This building (according to the plaque that commemorates it) was used to house Parliamentary soldiers from Cromwell regiment. The buildings date back only to the 17th century when the village was being largely rebuilt.

Killinghall grew up as a river crossing over the River Nidd where a new bridge now stands (this was also a popular spot with many artists), but Killinghall found a new reputation with its quarries. The quarries have extracted their last lumps years ago, but many stone cutting businesses still exists in the area. A reminder of this is the lump of stone in the glebe that was quarried from the area. This stone also helped make many of Harrogate's structures.

On 5 July 2014, the Tour de France Stage 1 from Leeds to Harrogate passed through the village.

== Governance ==
The first parish meeting was held in 1895.

There is an electoral ward called Killinghall. This ward stretches north to Ripley and in the 2011 census had a total population of 3,306.

== Geography ==
=== River Nidd and Oak Beck ===
These are the rivers that cover the north, and half the south sides of the village. The River Nidd is crossed by two bridges directly next to each other; the biggest of which is for most traffic and leads to Ripley, the other is for small traffic and carries a road that comes from the main one (Ripon Road), and joins back onto it after the water. The Nidderdale Greenway joins this small road.

=== Killinghall Moor ===
The borders are not well defined but are roughly Jennyfields, Harlow Hill and the River Nidd. Killinghall Moor has no heather and looks particularly green as it is not a moor by definition but by name. It is a suburb of western Harrogate that is on the south edge of the A59 road. Killinghall Moor Conservation Group has been formed to protect the area around Killinghall Moor from development.

== Culture and community ==
=== Glebe ===
The glebe has been converted into a children's play area. It is located just outside the church. The land it stands on has had to be drained and reseeded in order to be made fit for purpose. Project finished on 30 April 2006.

=== Village hall ===
The villagers want for a village hall first gained momentum in the 1930s, and in 1937 residents bought an old board school. It was not until the coronation of George VI that volunteers pulled together and built one. The village hall is used by toddlers and the elderly alike for clubs, meetings, and groups.

=== Killinghall play group ===
Young children's day care.

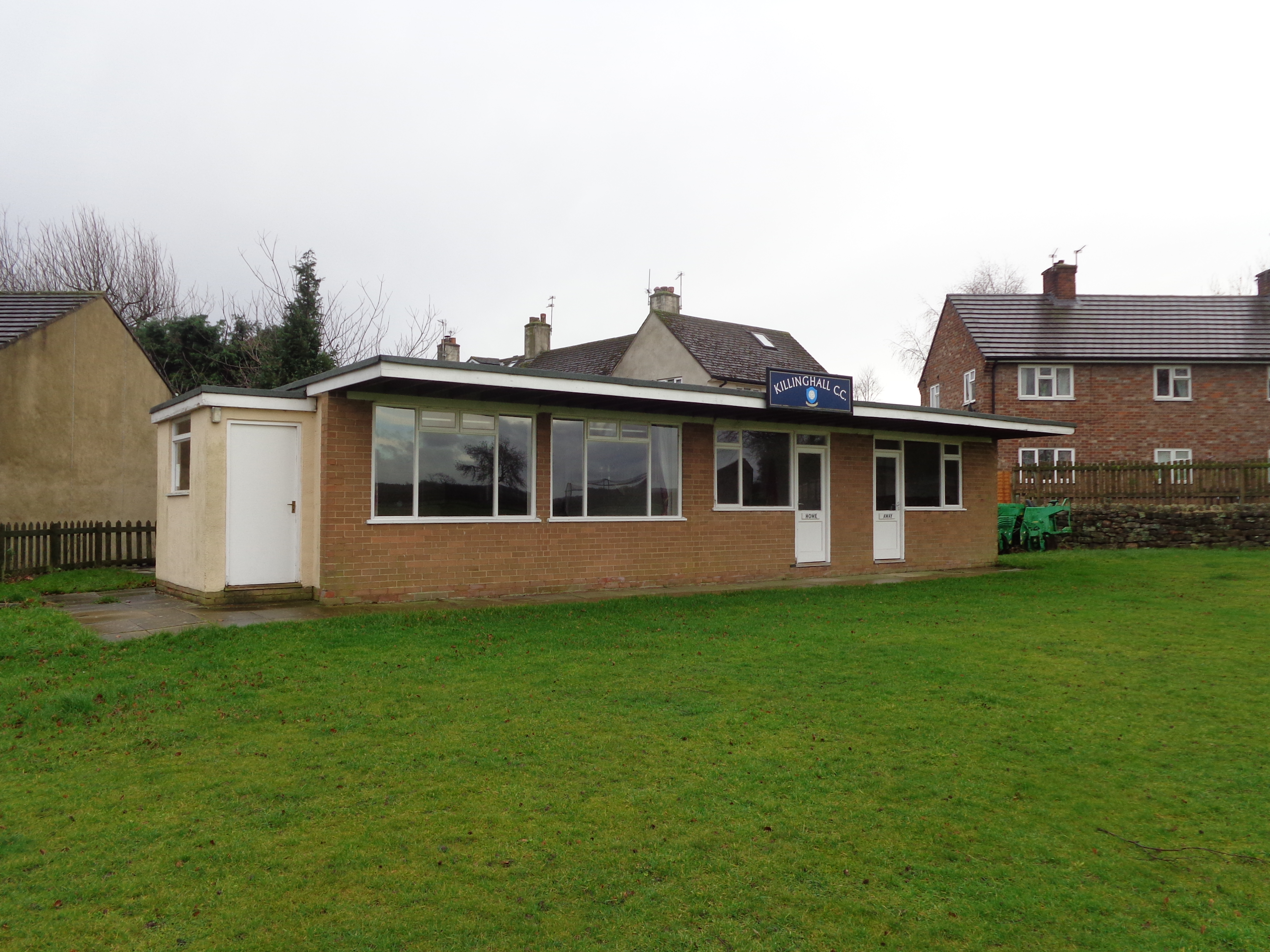
Killinghall Cricket Club, 2014

=== Sport ===
The village is represented by a cricket team who play in the Theakston Nidderdale League, a football team and a children's football team.

== Landmarks ==
=== Hazel Manor ===
Built in 1857, Hazel Manor has changed ownership many times, and is now a B&B.

== Transport ==
The village is bisected by the A61 road between Derby and Thirsk. The B6161 road from Pool-in-Wharfedale also ends at the centre of the village in north facing junction with the A61. Discussions about a Killinghall bypass have continued for some years. The road bridge over the River Nidd to the north of the village was built in the 1950s; the old bridge, which dates back to the 17th century and is grade II listed, is alongside the new bridge.

A bus service operates every 15 minutes on the route between Leeds, Harrogate and Ripon.

=== Nidderdale Greenway ===
The Nidderdale Greenway is a car–free cycle path that follows the route of a disused railway. It starts in Starbeck Harrogate, crosses the "Bilton triangle" (three railways of which two are disused that form a triangular shape), and then crosses Bilton Lane. After that the path goes over open fields until it reaches a 93 feet (28 m) high viaduct spanning the Nidd Gorge that was originally built in 1848. From there the path carries on across fields until in reaches the bridge next to Killlinghall. It then crosses Ripon Road then on to Ripley Castle. The greenway was opened in May 2013, almost a year before the Tour de France went past Ripley and Harrogate.

The railway that was originally along this route was primarily used to transport minerals, and later passengers until its closure in 1951. Killinghall was served by a railway station on the Nidd Valley Railway. The station was just west of Killinghall Bridge and in 1872, was renamed Ripley and then later, Ripley Valley. Whilst the station closed in 1951, the line remained open for goods traffic until 1964.

== Religious sites ==
=== St Thomas the Apostle Church ===
This church dates back to the creation of its parish in 1880 and graves are still being dug. Built in mock gothic.

=== Methodist chapel ===
Killinghall Methodist Church, part of the Nidd Valley Methodist Circuit, is situated on Ripon Road. Its minister is Reverend Ben Clowes. A chapel on this site was first erected in 1792, not long after Methodism began. It is currently being refurbished to reopen in January 2023.

== See also ==
- Listed buildings in Killinghall
