= Bilton Gala =

Community event in North Yorkshire, England

The Bilton Gala is a community event that takes place in Bilton, Harrogate, North Yorkshire on the first Bank Holiday in May each year.

The first Bilton Gala took place in 1977 to mark the Queen’s Silver Jubilee. Since then it has grown, and is now such a large event that it has spread to the fields adjoining Richard Taylor C of E School where it has traditionally been held. The Bilton Gala use the funds raised at the main event to donate to local charities, groups and organisations. In 2008, the Gala set up a Charitable Trust, the Bilton Community Fund, to manage the ever increasing funds raised each year. The funds are available in the form of grants and awards to groups, organisations and individuals in the Bilton area of Harrogate.

Billowby bear is the Gala mascot. Billowby enjoys visiting local schools and organisations, and often delivers grants to successful applicants in person.

== Gala Queen/King ==
The Gala is overseen by the Gala Queen and her two attendants who are elected each year by the committee and upstanding members of the local community. Children from local schools, or who live in the community, are encouraged to apply each year for the three coveted roles and it is a great honour to be selected. In 2008, the Gala decided to move with the times and widen its criteria in order to attract a potential Gala King. The Gala elected its first King in 2011 in Mark Nicholls.

The day starts with the Parade which is led by the Queen/King and their attendants in a chauffeur-driven car. Following them are usually the Harrogate sea cadet band from the Sea Cadet Corps (United Kingdom) and many colourful and elaborate floats that reflect each year's chosen theme, members of local sports clubs and organisations, local businesses, bands, majorettes and the Mayor/Mayoress of Harrogate. Children are also invited to join the parade in fancy dress. The parade snakes through the streets of Bilton which are lined with supporters. There is always a prize for the best float.

2013    Lily Robins
2012	Ella Hyde		2012    Lily Robins
2011	Mark Nicholls	        2011	Jasmine Tyler
2009	Lauren Woodhall	        2010	Joseph Atkinson
2008	Alice McAvoy	        2007	Amy Frost
2006	Amber Hardcastle	2005	Katie Small
2004	Charlotte Oxley	        2003	Elizabeth Cooper
2002	Katie Newton	        2001	Natalie Fulcher
2000	Tiffany Purchase	1999	Sarah McGrail
1998	Sarah Simpson	        1997	Rachel Simpson
1996	Sarah Morrell	        1995	Julia Bullock
1994	Anna Littlefair	        1993	Clair Jennings
1992	Kay Rushworth	        1991	Rachel Charlton
1990	Lynne Niddrie	        1989	Suzanne Smyth
1988	Samantha Thornell	1987	Fiona Thompson
1986	Wendy Leach	        1985	Sarah Foy
1984	Michelle McKenzie	1983	Michelle Johnstone
1982	Suzanne Johnstone	1981	Nicola Spruce
1980	Eunice Thompson	        1979	Maria Willmore
1978	Yvonne Ayres	        1977	Julie Tennyson

Once the parade has finished the day continues with the fancy dress competition which is judged by the Mayor/Mayoress in the main arena.

The arena then hosts an afternoon of entertainment which in the past has included stunt riders, bird of prey displays, bands, dance troops and aerial displays.

Around the arena and in the adjoining fields are many other attractions such as donkey rides, exotic animal displays, many stalls and games, the Army, magicians, food stalls and fairground rides.

Bilton Gala is one of the premier community events in Harrogate and the surrounding area.

The Gala is organised each year by a group of local volunteers.

== 2014 ==
Bilton Gala is one of the premier community events in Harrogate and the surrounding area, it provides first class professional entertainment and a host of stands and attractions to suit all tastes. The event continues to grow and become ever more popular providing an affordable day out for the whole family at only £1.50 per adult and 50p for under 16's. The 2014 event will take place on Monday 5 May.

The Gala seeks to provide entertainment to suit all tastes and next year will be no exception.
