= Gardeners Arms =

Pub in Harrogate, North Yorkshire, England

Coordinates: 54°00′51″N 1°31′11″W

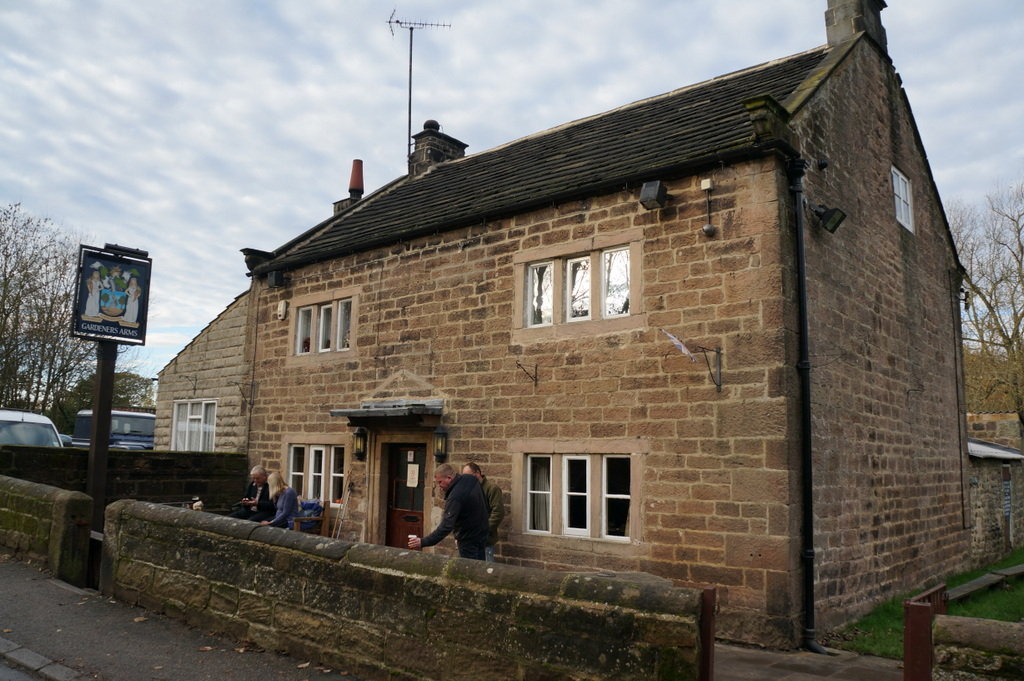
The pub, in 2013

The Gardeners Arms is a pub in Bilton, a suburb of Harrogate in North Yorkshire.

The pub was built, probably in 1698, for the Mountgarrett estate. It has retained its original layout, although the rear rooms have been converted from residential to pub use, and there is a 20th century extension at the west end. In the 1970s, the estate sold the pub to its tenant, Maurice Johnson. The pub was purchased by Sean Franklin in 1980, who set up a brewery on the premises, at which he pioneered the use of American hops in the United Kingdom. In 1988, Daleside Brewery moved in. The pub was later sold to Samuel Smith Old Brewery. It has lawns to the side and rear with numerous tables and seats, and trees and a stream behind. The pub was grade II listed in 1975, and it is rated two stars on the National Inventory of Historic Pub Interiors.

The public house is built of gritstone, and has a stone slate roof with coped gables and kneelers. There are two storeys and two bays. The central doorway has an architrave and a bracketed hood, and the windows are mullioned with three lights, and contain sashes. Inside, there is a central corridor with rooms either side. On the right is the parlour, with a serving hatch, and behind it is a small bar and snug. On the left is a room named the "piggery", with a large fireplace, and behind is a room named "Wrinkley Lodge". The floors have flagstones.

== See also ==
- Listed buildings in Harrogate (Bilton Ward)
