= St John's Church, Bilton =

Church in North Yorkshire, England

Coordinates: 54.0082°N 1.5369°W

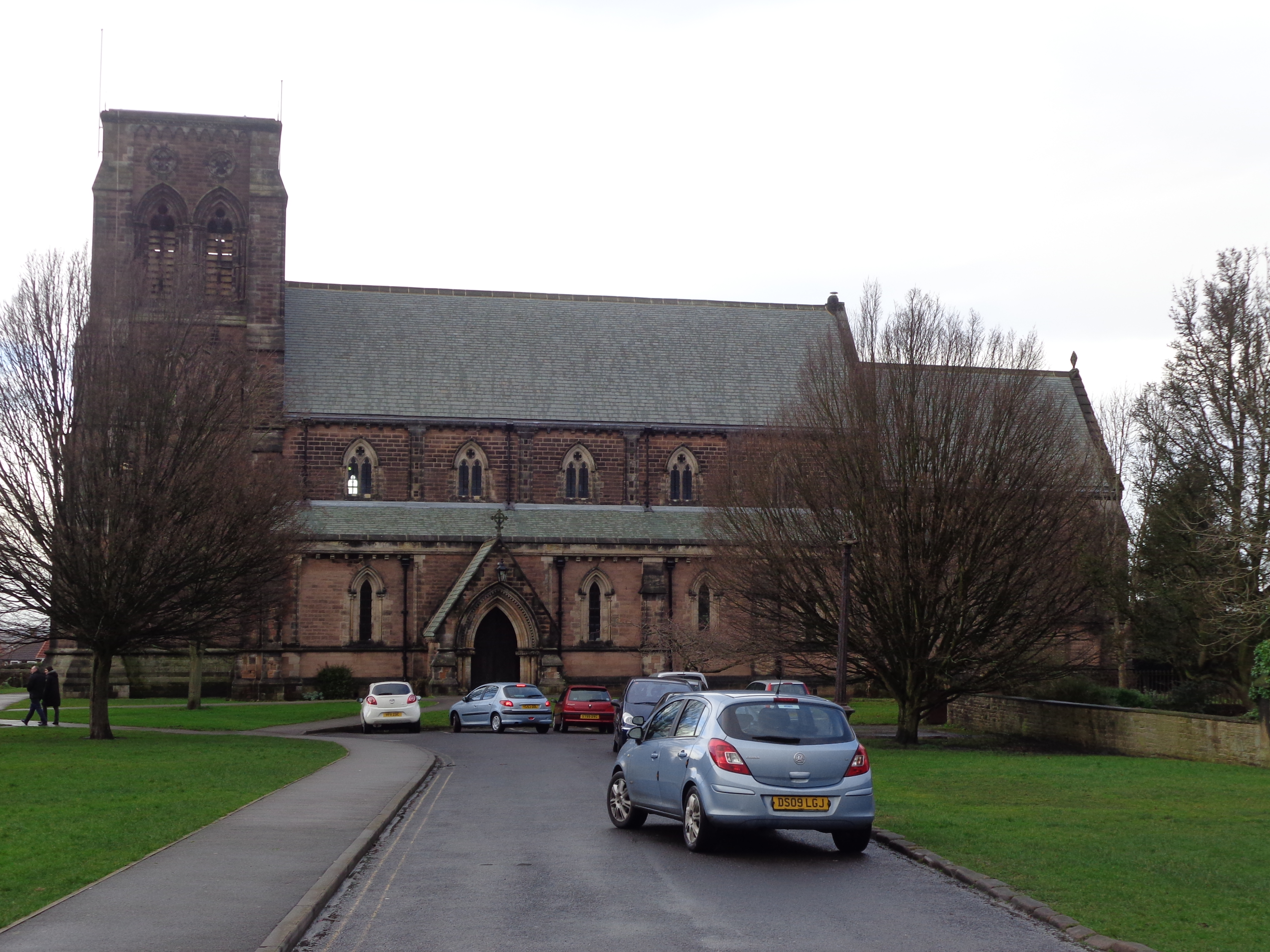
The church, in 2014

St John's Church is the parish church of Bilton, a suburb of Harrogate in North Yorkshire.

The church was constructed between 1851 and 1857, to a design by George Gilbert Scott. It is in the Early English style, and cost about £10,000 (equivalent to £1,383,006 in 2023). The work was funded entirely by William Sheepshanks, with his son becoming the first vicar. In 1858, the church was given its own parish. Although it was built with an organ installed, it proved too loud for many services, and a smaller organ was added in 1860. The church was reordered in about 1970, and in 1975 it was grade II* listed.

The church is built of gritstone, with stone dressings in a contrasting colour, and a green slate roof with corbelled eaves. It consists of a nave with a clerestory, north and south aisles, a south porch, a chancel and a west tower. The aisle windows are lancets, in the clerestory are two-light windows, and at the east end are three tall lancets.

== See also ==
- Grade II* listed churches in North Yorkshire (district)
- Listed buildings in Harrogate (Bilton Ward)
