= Red Cat Cottage =

Cottage in Harrogate, North Yorkshire, England

Coordinates: 54.011°N 1.541°W

The Red Cat Cottage (formerly Red Cat Inn), a Grade II listed building, is now a residence that sits at the top of Bachelor Gardens in Bilton, a district of Harrogate in North Yorkshire, England. At the time of Oliver Cromwell this house was an inn that sat on Dragon Lane. The earliest part of the house dates back to the 17th century, whilst the main body was added in the 18th century and the top of the house was built in the 20th century. A red dragon was painted on the outside of the inn as it was known as the Red Dragon. Over the years locals thought the Dragon resembled more of a cat and the Inn became known as the Red Cat. The Red Cat Inn is now known as the Red Cat Cottage and is still a residence to this day.

== See also ==
- Listed buildings in Harrogate (Bilton Ward)
