= Nidderdale Greenway =

Rail trail in North Yorkshire, England

Coordinates: 54.030°N 1.546°W

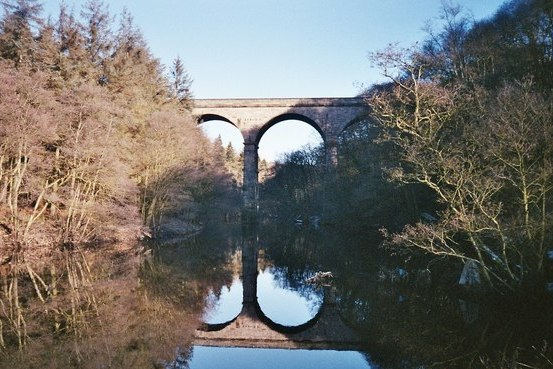
- Nidd Viaduct which carries the Nidderdale Greenway
- Length: 4 miles (6.4 km)
- Location: North Yorkshire
- Use: Cycling, pedestrians, runners, horse-riding.

The Nidderdale Greenway is a 4-mile (6.4 km) path that runs between Harrogate and Ripley in North Yorkshire, England. It uses a former railway line that ran between Harrogate and Pateley Bridge as its course. The route connects to other cycle paths including the Way of the Roses.

== Route ==
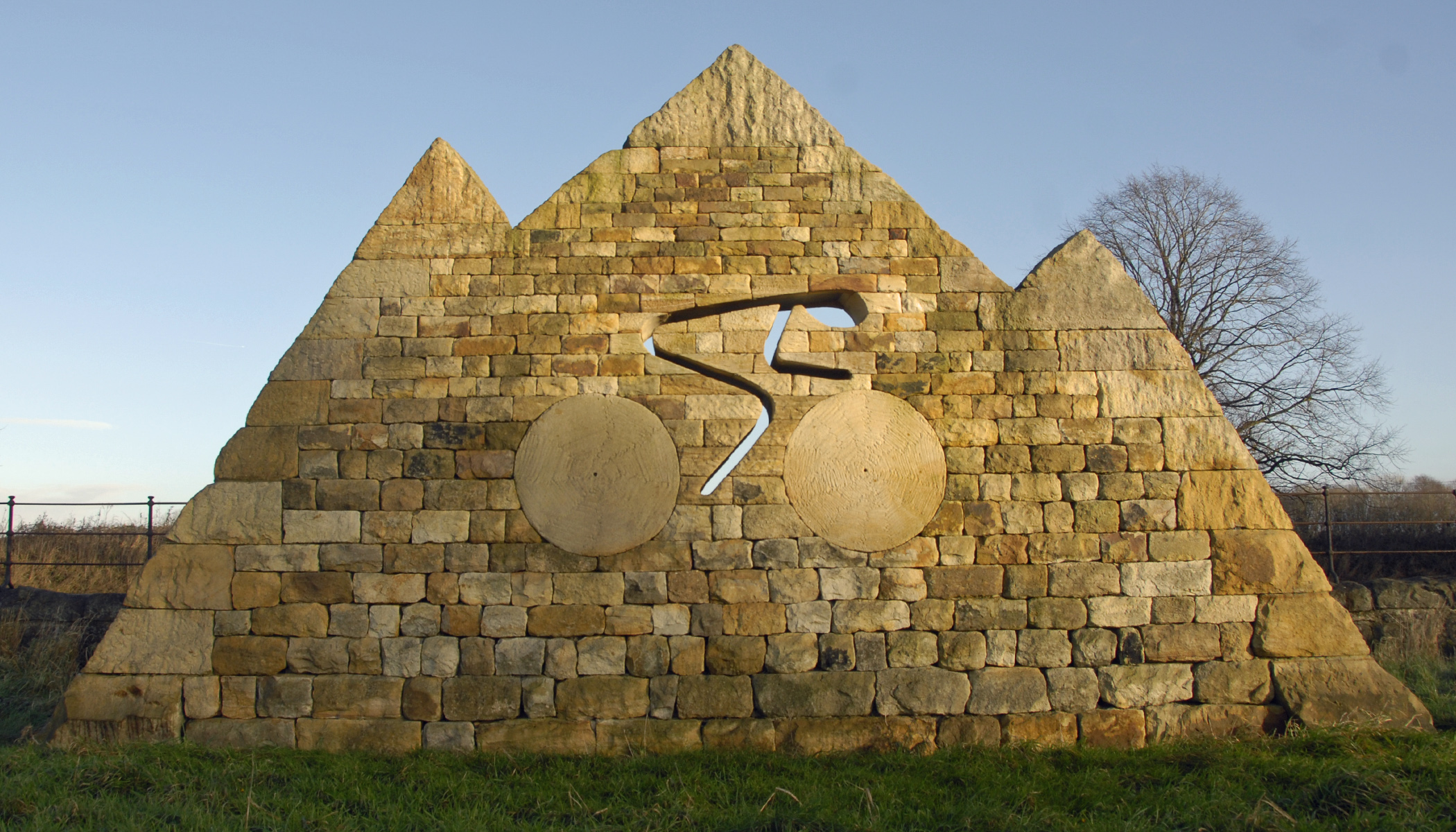
A bike sculpture at Ripley. It was built to celebrate the first Tour de Yorkshire

The former Nidd Valley Railway closed completely in 1964 and Leeds-Thirsk railway line was closed in 1969. The Nidderdale Greenway makes use of both of these former railways to provide a traffic-free walking and cycle zone that extends from Bilton (in north eastern Harrogate) to the village of Ripley, which is 4 miles (6.4 km) further north. The Greenway was first proposed in the 1990s and after land purchases, public inquiries and a lottery grant, was officially opened in May 2013. The route is very popular and is used by pedestrians, cyclists, runners and horse-riders.

Starting at Bilton (which is on the southern link of the Way of the Roses cycle route), the route heads north-westerly on the former Leeds-Thirsk railway line. At Bilton Beck Wood, it crosses the River Nidd on the grade II-listed seven-arch Nidd Viaduct. The viaduct is at the western end of the Nidd Gorge, where the waters of the River Nidd are funneled into a steep ravine. Just west of the village of Nidd, the route diverges onto the former Nidd valley Railway line until it reaches the A61 road at Killinghall Bridge. It then crosses the A61 by means of a Pegasus crossing and runs parallel to the road into Ripley on its own path. The last section into Ripley was donated by the owners of Ripley castle to allow safe passage into the village without cyclists having to resort to using the A61.

The greenway is part of the National Cycle Route 67 which runs from Long Eaton to Northallerton, although parts of it are as yet to be completed. At both ends, the path links into other paths and long distance cycles routes to Brimham Rocks, Fountains Abbey, Knaresborough, and Starbeck. The route is maintained by Sustrans Rangers and in May 2017, a redundant Millennium Milepost was installed on the Greenway carrying information about the route on it. Harrogate Borough Council are working on extending the path from Bilton by a further 0.62 miles (1 km) to the south-west which will connect that part of the route with Harrogate railway station.

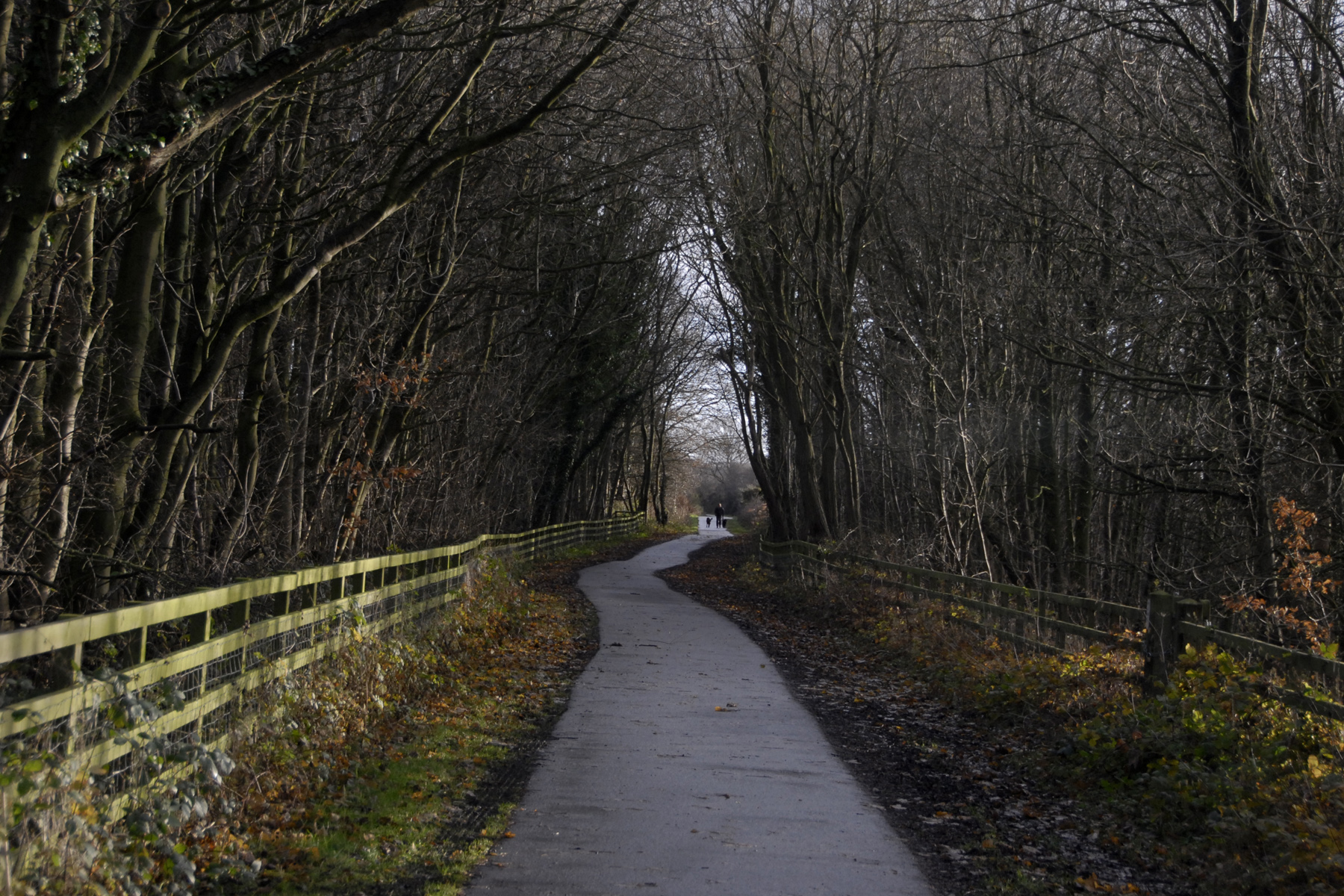
This view is looking south from the former Nidd Junction on the Leeds & Thirsk Railway, now used as the Nidderdale Greenway.

A bike sculpture made of stones was unveiled just south of Ripley alongside the greenway to celebrate the 2014 Tour de France which passed by Ripley. There is also a portrait bench at the Bilton end of the Greenway which depicts local cycling heroes. The bench is part of a national scheme operated by Sustrans to promote local cycling heroes on the National Cycle Routes.

The route may be under threat by a proposal to build a bypass for the A61 which would go from the east side of Harrogate and re-join the existing A61 east of Ripley. This would avoid the road going through Killinghall, but as yet, the plans have not been published. The greenway is also under threat of a possible resurgent railway between Harrogate and Ripon, as Bilton Viaduct would need to be utilized in any re-opened railway line.

== Extension ==
An extension to the greenway was added in 2014. This allows users at the north end to go further on than Ripley towards the village of Clint. A further extension on the trackbed of the Nidd Valley railway to Pateley Bridge has been proposed to avoid the necessity for cyclists using the narrow and winding B6165.
