= Harrogate bus route 36 =

Leeds to Harrogate and Ripon bus

The Harrogate Bus Company Route 36

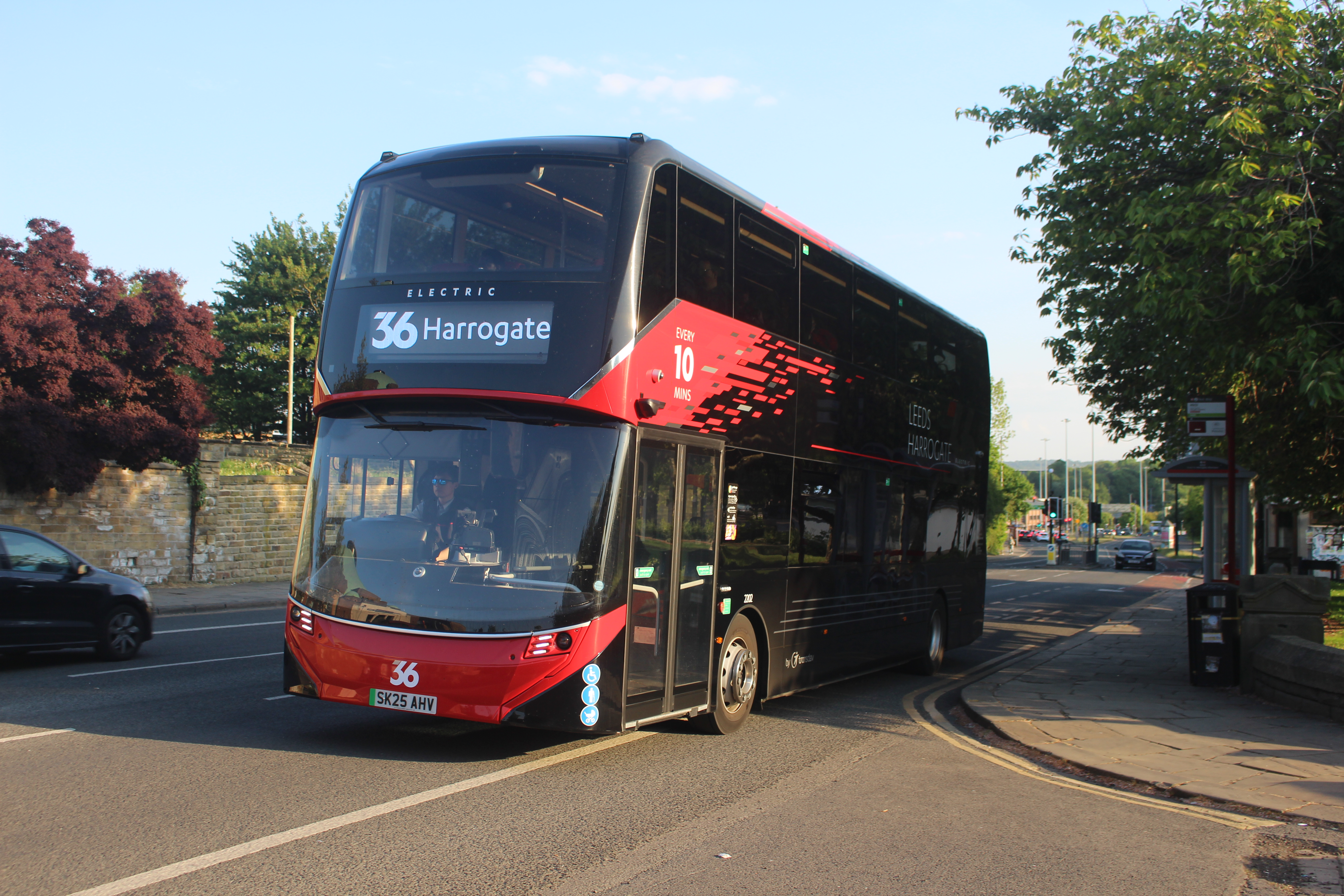

Overview
- Operator: The Harrogate Bus Company
- Depot: Starbeck
- Vehicle: Wright Gemini 3 bodied Volvo B5TL (2016–2024); Alexander Dennis Enviro400EV (2024–Present)

Route
- Locale: North Yorkshire; West Yorkshire
- Termini: Leeds; Harrogate; Ripon

Service
- Frequency: Every 10 minutes (Leeds to Harrogate) Every 30 minutes (Leeds to Ripon)

The 36 is a bus service operated by The Harrogate Bus Company, which links Leeds, Harewood and Harrogate with Killinghall, Ripley and Ripon. It is operated by a fleet of high-specification Alexander Dennis Enviro400EV double-deck vehicles, branded in a red and black livery.

The service is an example of a premium service characterised by more luxurious vehicles compared to those used on other commuter lines, which in combination with a high service frequency has significantly increased ridership and influenced the modal split in favour of public transport.

== History ==
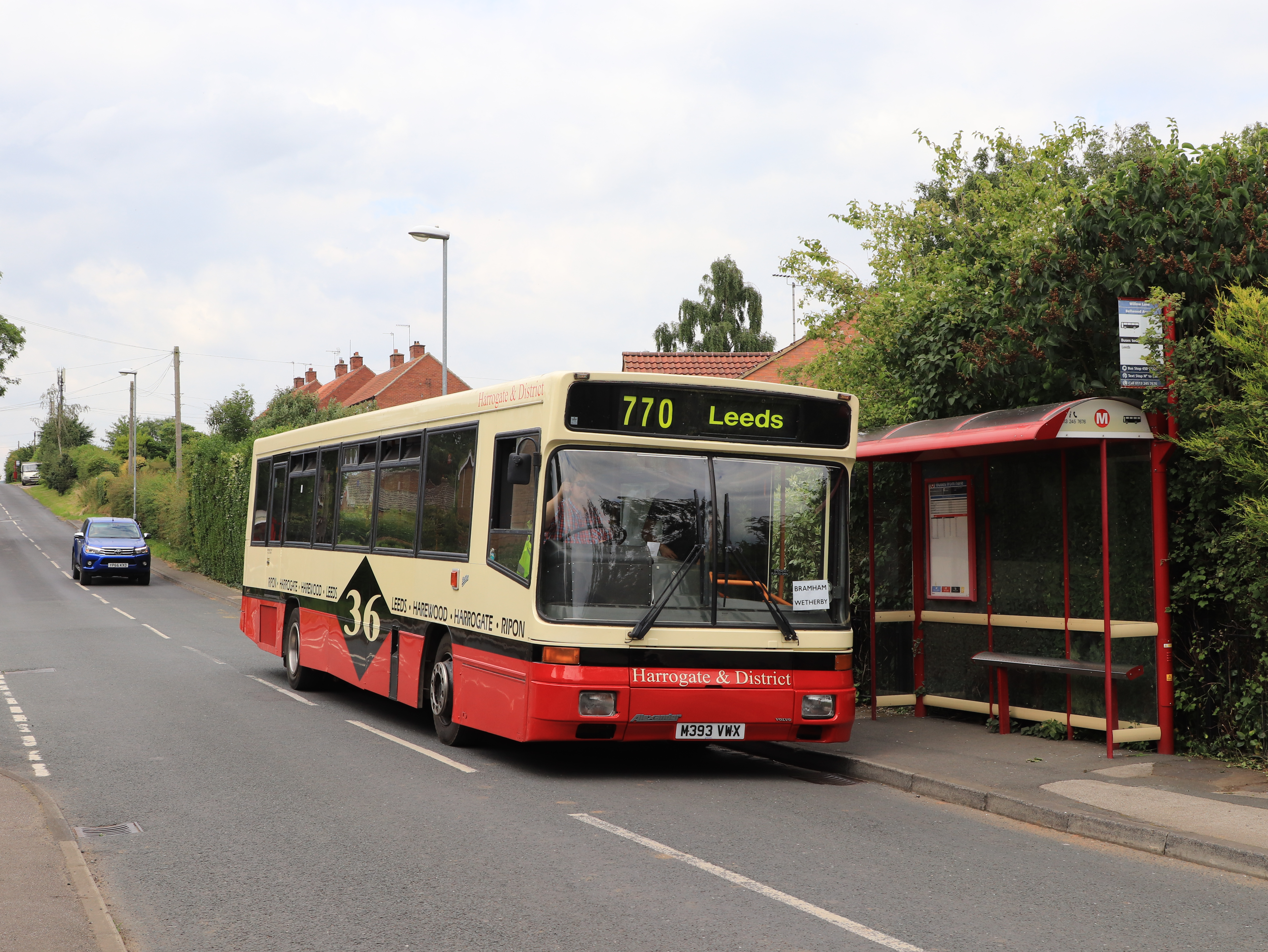
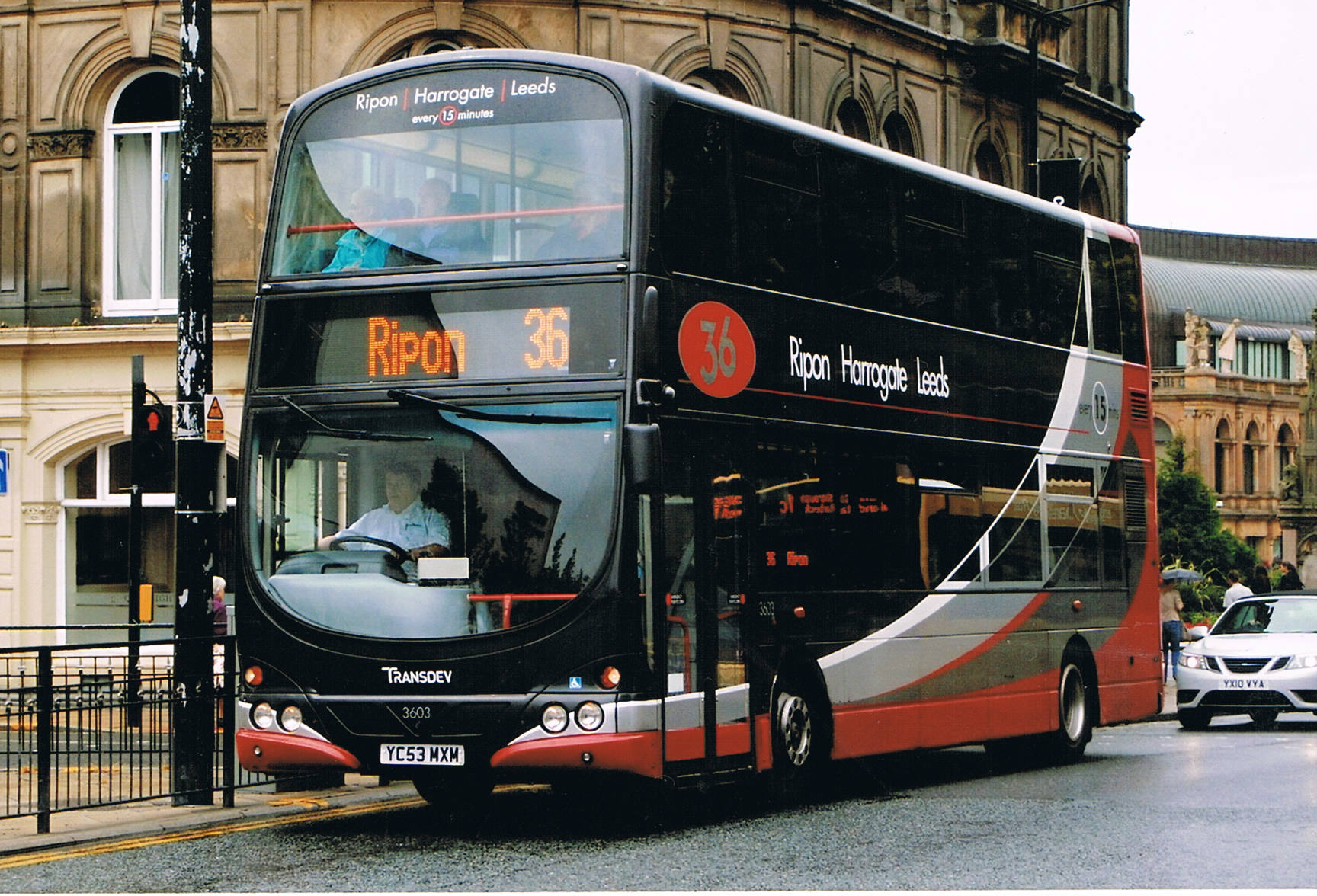
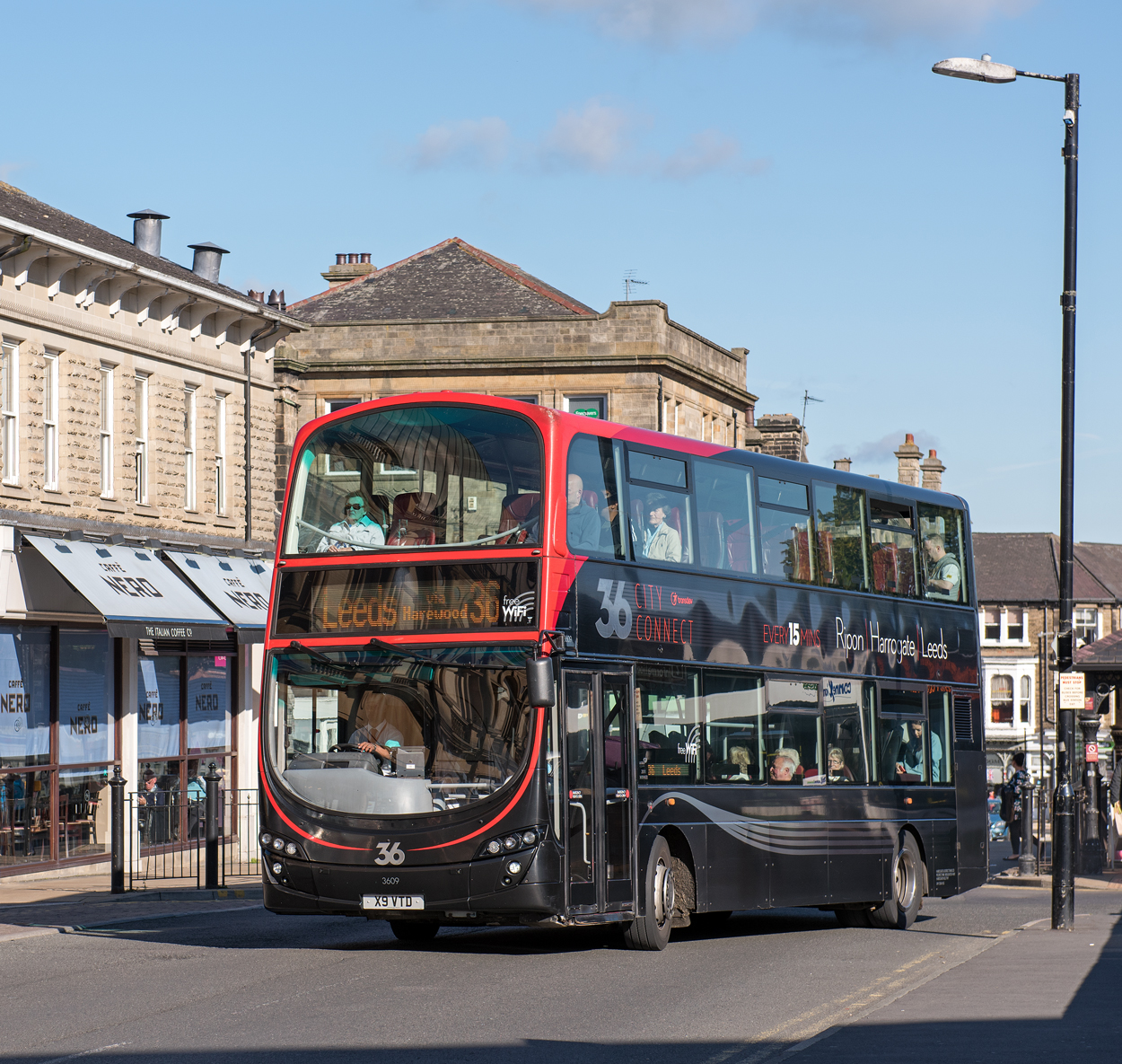
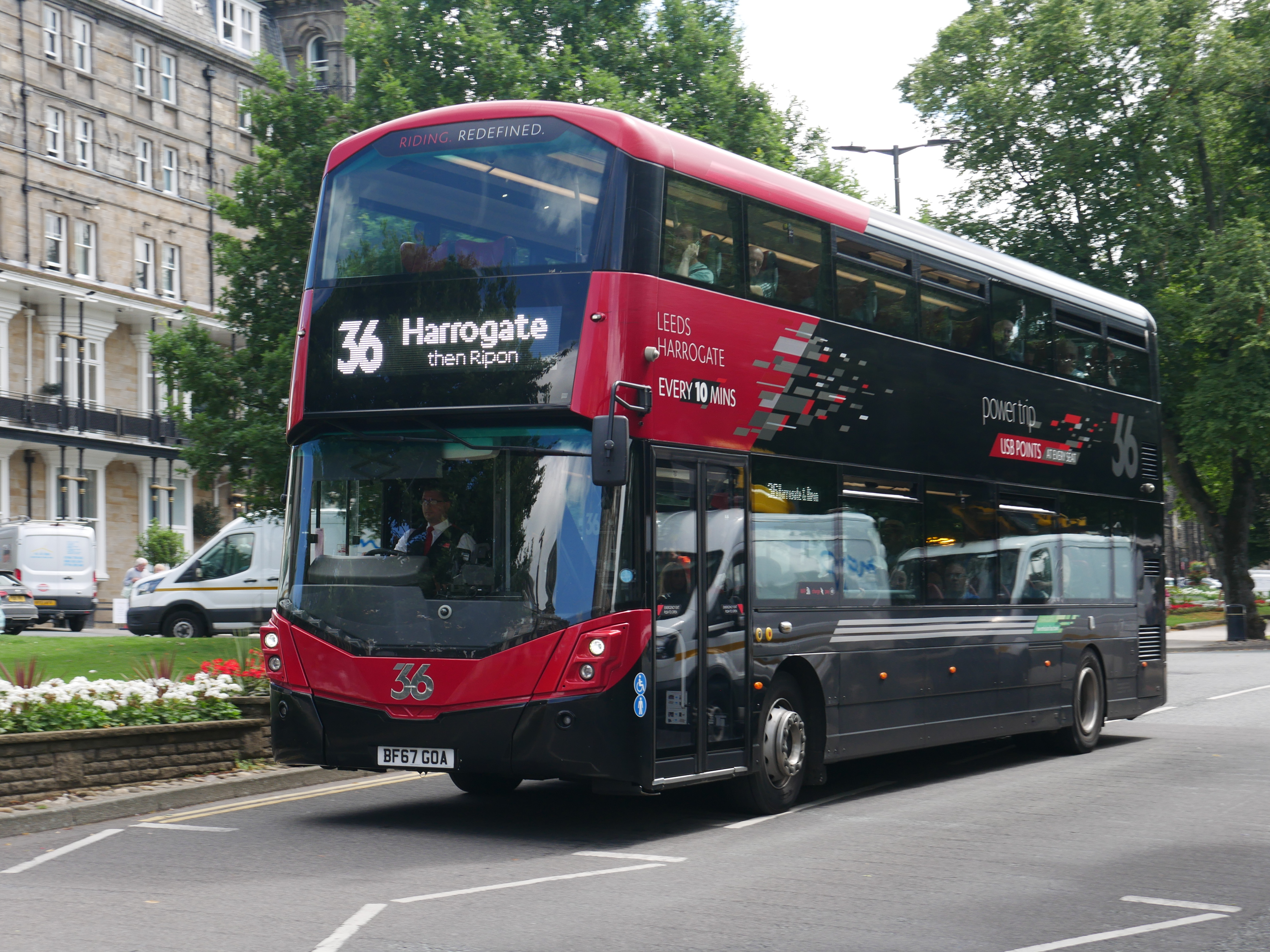
A selection of historic buses and liveries

Trains on the Leeds to Northallerton Railway had provided the main service between Leeds and Ripon between 1848 and 1967, until passenger services were cut back to Harrogate, following the infamous Beeching cuts. Since then, Ripon has only been served by bus services, with Harrogate and Knaresborough being the nearest rail stations to the city.

The 36 was originally operated by the West Yorkshire Road Car Company from the mid-1960s, with the route running between Vicar Lane in Leeds and Ripon Railway Station. However, most journeys only operated between Leeds and Harrogate.

Route 36 began operating using a fleet of Leyland Lynxes. In the 1990s, they were replaced by a fleet of Alexander Strider and Wright Endurance bodied Volvo B10Bs, Wright Renown bodied Volvo B10BLEs and Alexander Royale bodied Volvo Olympians.

In October 2003, Harrogate & District relaunched route 36 with fourteen Wright Eclipse Gemini bodied Volvo B7TLs with leather seats. The improvements lead to an increase in patronage by 18% in 2006 alone.

In 2011, the 36 fleet underwent a refurbishment program. The route received a new identity – named ‘36 City Connect’ – and a new red and black livery was introduced, alongside the addition of new leather coach-style seats, and the introduction of a 2+1 seating arrangement behind the staircase upstairs. The buses were also fitted with new front fascias, as seen on their facelifted second generation model, and new powertrains.

In January 2016, route 36 was again relaunched with fourteen new Wright Gemini 3 bodied Volvo B5TLs, fitted with coach-style leather seating and passenger amenities such as WiFi connectivity, USB charging points, an on-board library and audio-visual next stop information. It also launched under a new brand name – "The 36: Riding Redefined".

In October 2017, a new timetable for route 36 was introduced, increasing the frequency from every 15 minutes to every 10 minutes between Leeds and Harrogate. To accommodate the increased service, three additional Wright Gemini 3 buses were added to the fleet.

In September 2021, a night service was reintroduced on Saturdays.

Funding from the UK Government's Zero Emission Bus Regional Area (ZEBRA) scheme was secured in May 2022 to aid Transdev Blazefield and North Yorkshire County Council in the electrification of the 36, which will see nineteen Alexander Dennis Enviro400EV battery electric double-decker buses with pantograph chargers delivered to replace the existing diesel Volvo B5TLs on the service. The first Enviro400EV was revealed at an unveiling event in June. They were announced to be expected to start entering service from early September.
