= Listed buildings in Killinghall =

Killinghall is a civil parish in the county of North Yorkshire, England. It contains 17 listed buildings that are recorded in the National Heritage List for England. All the listed buildings are designated at Grade II, the lowest of the three grades, which is applied to "buildings of national importance and special interest". The parish contains the village of Killinghall and the surrounding countryside. The listed buildings consist of houses, cottages, farmhouses, two bridges, a milestone, boundary stones and mileposts.

== Buildings ==
| Name and location | Photograph | Date | Notes |
|---|---|---|---|
| Kennel Hall Farmhouse; 54.02554°N 1.56357°W | | Early 17th century (probable) | The farmhouse is in pink-grey gritstone on a plinth, with quoins, a string course, a moulded eaves cornice, and a stone slate roof with gable copings and shaped kneelers. There are two storeys and three bays, and a lower two-storey two-bay range recessed on the left. The doorway has a fanlight, and throughout there are recessed chamfered mullion windows. |
| Killinghall Bridge; 54.03227°N 1.56288°W | | 17th century (or earlier) | The bridge, which crosses, the River Nidd has been replaced by a later bridge upstream. It is in gritstone and consists of two segmental arches crossing the river, and four similar arches to the north. There is a massive cutwater on the upstream side rising as a pilaster, and similar pilasters between most arches. The parapet projects slightly, and has flat coping. |
| Levens Hall; 54.01681°N 1.58445°W | — | 17th century | The house is in pink-grey gritstone, with quoins, and a stone slate roof with gable copings and shaped kneelers. There are two storeys and three bays, and a rear single-storey bay. The windows are mullioned, and at the rear is a mullioned and transomed stair window. |
| Spruisty Bridge; 54.01501°N 1.55165°W | | 17th or 18th century | A former packhorse bridge crossing Oak Beck, it is in stone, and consists of a singe slightly pointed arch. The bridge has a plain parapet, and end piers with pyramidical caps. |
| Low Hall, wall, railing and gates 54.02624°N 1.56410°W | — | 1701. | The house is in pink-grey gritstone with stone slate roofs. The oldest part is the left bay, and the main block was added in 1750. The older bay has two storeys, and contains a doorway with a moulded surround and a triangular dated lintel. The main block has two storeys and an attic, and three bays. There is a chamfered plinth, rusticated quoins, a string course, a moulded eaves cornice, and gable copings. On the right return is a porch with Tuscan columns, an entablature and a cornice, and the windows in both parts are mullioned. Along the front are wrought iron railings and gates, the gate piers in stone and chamfered. |
| Crag Hill Farmhouse; 54.02692°N 1.57815°W | | Early 18th century | The house, which was later extended, is in pink-grey gritstone, and has stone slate roofs with gable copings and kneelers. There are two storeys, and it consists of a main bay, a lower recessed bay on the right, and a two-bay wing at right angles. The main bay has rusticated quoins, a string course, and a moulded eaves cornice. The doorway on the right has an architrave, an entablature with S-scrolls, and a triangular pediment, and on the left are two-light windows. The windows in the wing are horizontally-sliding sashes. |
| Hollins Hall Farmhouse; 54.01731°N 1.58983°W | — | 1732 | The house is in gritstone, with quoins, a wooden fascia board, and a purple slate roof. There are two storeys and five bays. On the front is a two-storey gabled porch containing a doorway with a moulded quoined surround, a triangular head, and a dated and initialled lintel, and to the left is a doorway with a similar surround. Throughout, there are recessed chamfered mullion windows. |
| Milestone; 53.99608°N 1.60658°W | | 1738 | The combined milestone and constabulary boundary stone is about 26 centimetres (10 in) square and 188 centimetres (74 in) high. There are inscriptions on the north and west faces, including the date, the distances in Roman numerals to Skipton and Knaresborough, and pointing hands. |
| Boundary stone (northwest); 54.01806°N 1.59453°W | — | Late 18th century | The boundary stone is in gritstone, and consists of a short rectangular post with a rough carved top. One side is inscribed with "K". |
| Boundary stone (southwest); 54.01705°N 1.59432°W | — | Late 18th century | The boundary stone is in gritstone, and consists of a short rectangular post with a rough carved top. One side is inscribed with "H". |
| Low Hall Cottage, Holly Cottage and Pear Tree Cottage; 54.02587°N 1.56398°W | — | Late 18th century (probable) | A terrace of cottages in gritstone, with quoins, and a stone slate roof with gable coping and shaped kneelers. There are two storeys and five bays. Each cottage has a doorway, and the windows are horizontally-sliding sashes. |
| Rose Cottage; 54.02285°N 1.56613°W | — | c. 1800 | The house is in gritstone, with quoins, and a stone slate roof with gable copings and shaped kneelers. There are two storeys and two bays. The doorway is in the centre, and the windows are horizontally-sliding sashes. |
| Milepost at SE 2717 5702; 54.00873°N 1.58691°W | — | Mid 19th century | The milepost is on the north side of Skipton Road (A59 road), and is in gritstone with a cast iron plate. It has a triangular plan and a rounded top. On the top is inscribed "SKIPTON & KNARESBOROUGH ROAD" and "KILLINGHALL", on the left face are the distances to Harrogate and Knaresborough, and on the right face to Skipton. |
| Milepost at SE 2721 5498; 53.99012°N 1.58664°W | | Mid 19th century | The milepost is on the east side of Oaken Bank (B6161 road), and is in gritstone with a cast iron plate. It has a triangular plan and a rounded top. On the top is inscribed "DUDLEY HILL KILLINGHALL & HARROGATE ROAD KILLINGHALL", on the left face is the distance to Bradford, and on the right face to Killinghall. |
| Milepost at SE 2767 5672; 54.00588°N 1.57960°W | | Mid 19th century | The milepost is on the west side of Oaken Bank (B6161 road), and is in gritstone with a cast iron plate. It has a triangular plan and a rounded top. On the top is inscribed "DUDLEY HILL KILLINGHALL & HARROGATE ROAD KILLINGHALL", on the left face is the distance to Killinghall, and on the right face to Bradford. |
| Milepost at SE 2833 5818; 54.01915°N 1.56888°W | | Mid 19th century | The milepost is on the west side of Otley Road (B6161 road), and is in gritstone with a cast iron plate. It has a triangular plan and a rounded top. On the top is inscribed "DUDLEY HILL KILLINGHALL & HARROGATE ROAD KILLINGHALL", on the left face is the distance to Killinghall, and on the right face to Bradford. |
| Milepost at SE 2882 5807; 54.01804°N 1.56152°W | | Mid 19th century | The milepost is on the northeast side of Warren Bank (A61 road), and is in gritstone with a cast iron plate. It has a triangular plan and a sloping head, and is about 60 centimetres (24 in) high. On the head is the distance to Leeds, and on the sides are pointing hands, with the distance to Harrogate on the left side, and to Ripon on the right side. |
