= Nidd Gorge =

River gorge in North Yorkshire, England

Coordinates: 54.014°N 1.487°W

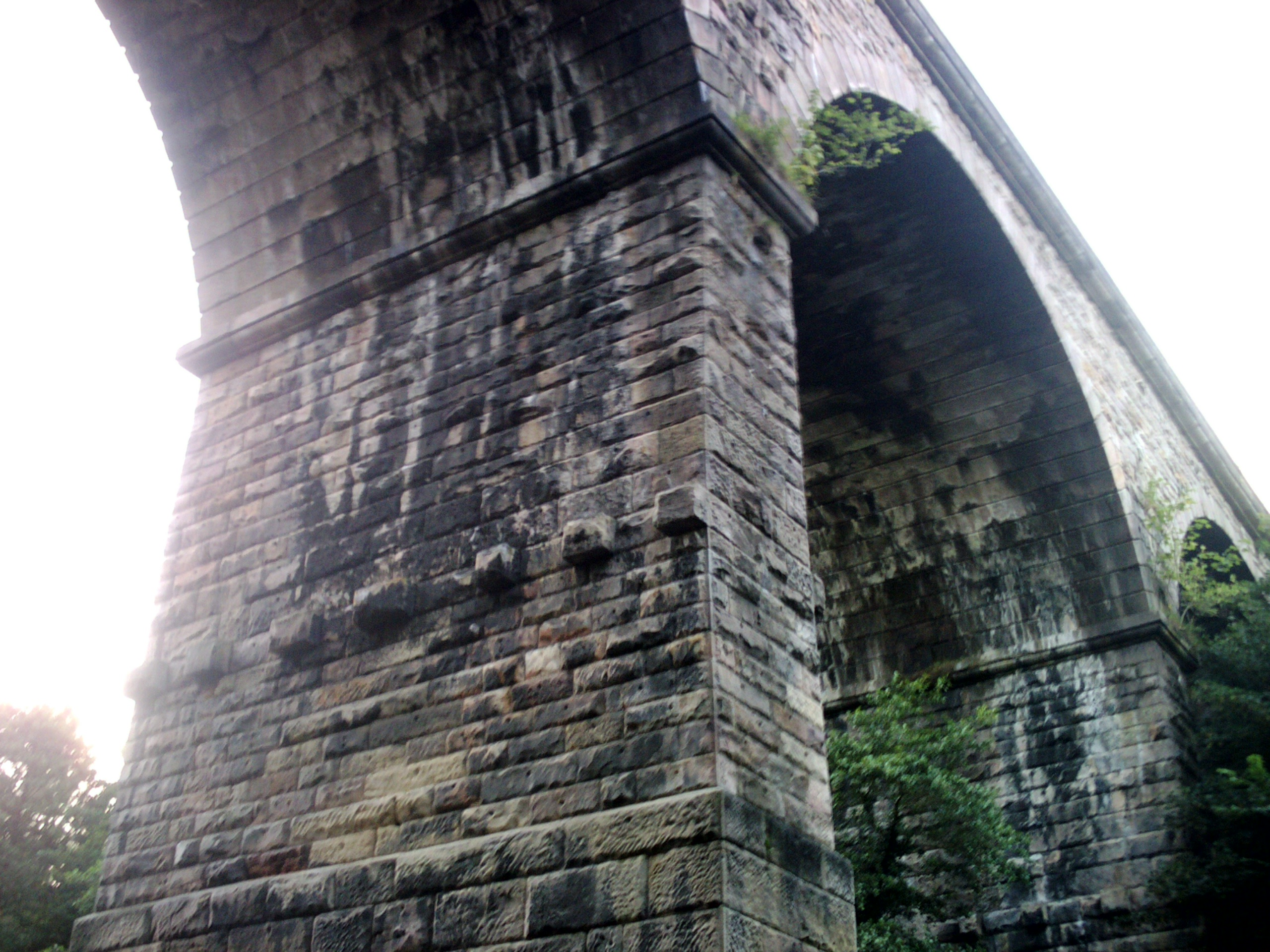
The Nidd Viaduct at Bilton which stands at 104 feet above the river was built in 1848 and was part of the now defunct railway line which used to run to Ripley, Ripon and Thirsk, carrying freight (mainly coal and later gas) and passengers until it closed in 1967.

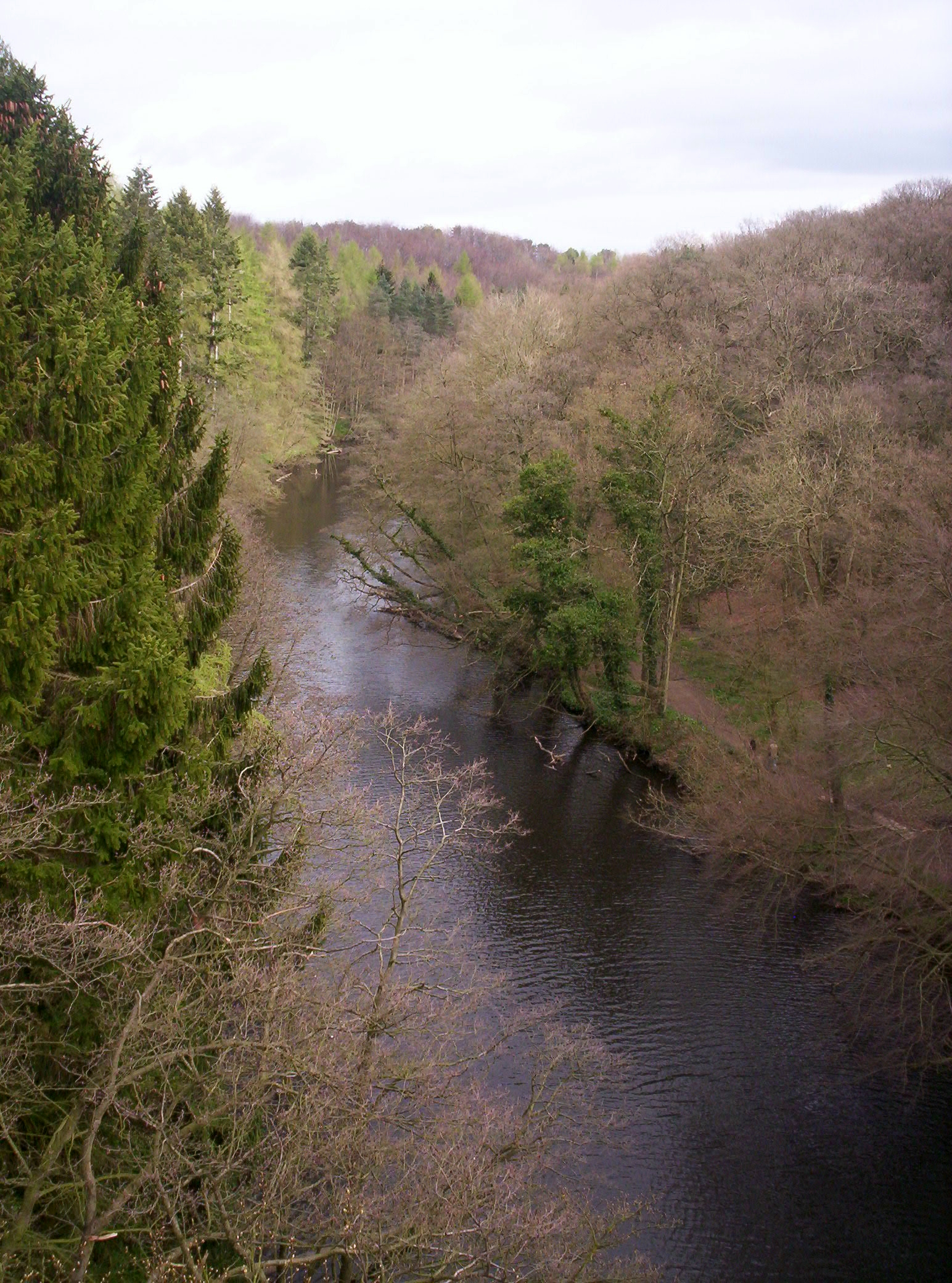
Nidd Gorge looking downstream from the Bilton viaduct. The path which runs alongside the river can be seen in the middle right of the photograph.

Nidd Gorge makes up a section of the River Nidd in North Yorkshire, England, in which the river enters a deep ravine with sheer tree-covered valley sides. The river as a whole flows from its source near Great Whernside in Nidderdale (part of the Yorkshire Dales), to its confluence with the River Ouse near Nun Monkton. Nidd Gorge makes up approximately 3 miles (4.8 km) of the entire length of the river, and stretches from the now defunct Nidd viaduct at Bilton in Harrogate to Grimbald Bridge, just south of Knaresborough.

== Background ==
The 120 feet (37 m) gorge was cut out of the soft sandstone during the last Ice Age. Humans were first active in this area around 5,000 years ago, but the extensive woodland has been there only since the early 17th century.

During the 18th century and the advent of the Industrial Revolution, mills began to operate along this stretch of the river, using the force of the water to drive the machinery. Scotton Flax mill was erected in 1798 and run by the company Eteson Dearlove until it ceased operation in 1851. Although this mill was classified as being in Bilton, there was actually another Bilton mill on the other side of the weir, which shared the Scotton weir with Scotton Flax mill as its source of power. Most evidence of this mill has since disappeared, while the 'Scotton' mill still stands, although it has been deindustrialised and now exists as a private residence.

== Management ==
In 1982, Harrogate Borough Council set up the Nidd Gorge Management Project in a bid to make the 68 acres (28 ha) area more accessible to hikers and cyclists, as the path along the river became treacherous and often impassable when there had been heavy rain. In areas in which the path was particularly susceptible to becoming impassable after heavy rain, the council placed duck boards which enable users of the route to easily negotiate any areas of the path which are likely to become particularly muddy.

Since this work has been carried out, the route is now popular among hikers and cyclists from all over Yorkshire, and the United Kingdom as a whole. The woodland in this area is also popular among birdwatchers, who come to observe the variety of species which inhabit the gorge. The project keeps a very close watch on the wildlife in this area as well as maintaining the route for hikers and cyclists, and as such is largely responsible for keeping the gorge an idyllic route for all members of the public. The woodland which surrounds Nidd Gorge is cared for by Woodland Trust who currently manage over 1000 areas of woodland within the United Kingdom.

The Nidd viaduct at the western end of the gorge, used to carry a railway between Harrogate and Pateley Bridge, Northallerton and Thirsk, and was closed in 1967. It now carries the Nidderdale Greenway, a tarmac path that allows walkers, cyclists, and those in wheelchairs or mobility scooters to travel the 4 miles (6.4 km) between the Bilton area of Harrogate and Ripley. The gorge and the greenway itself are under threat from a proposed new inner ring road linking Knaresborough and the north end of Harrogate.

== Wildlife ==
A wide variety of wildlife inhabits the gorge. The area is especially known among local entomologists for the diverse range of butterflies and high number of rare species of ladybirds. There are also many species of birds that live in the mixture of deciduous and coniferous woodland, such as treecreepers, nuthatches, and even the lesser spotted woodpecker.
