= Bilton, Harrogate =

Suburb in North Yorkshire, England

Coordinates: 54°00′32″N 1°32′00″W

Bilton
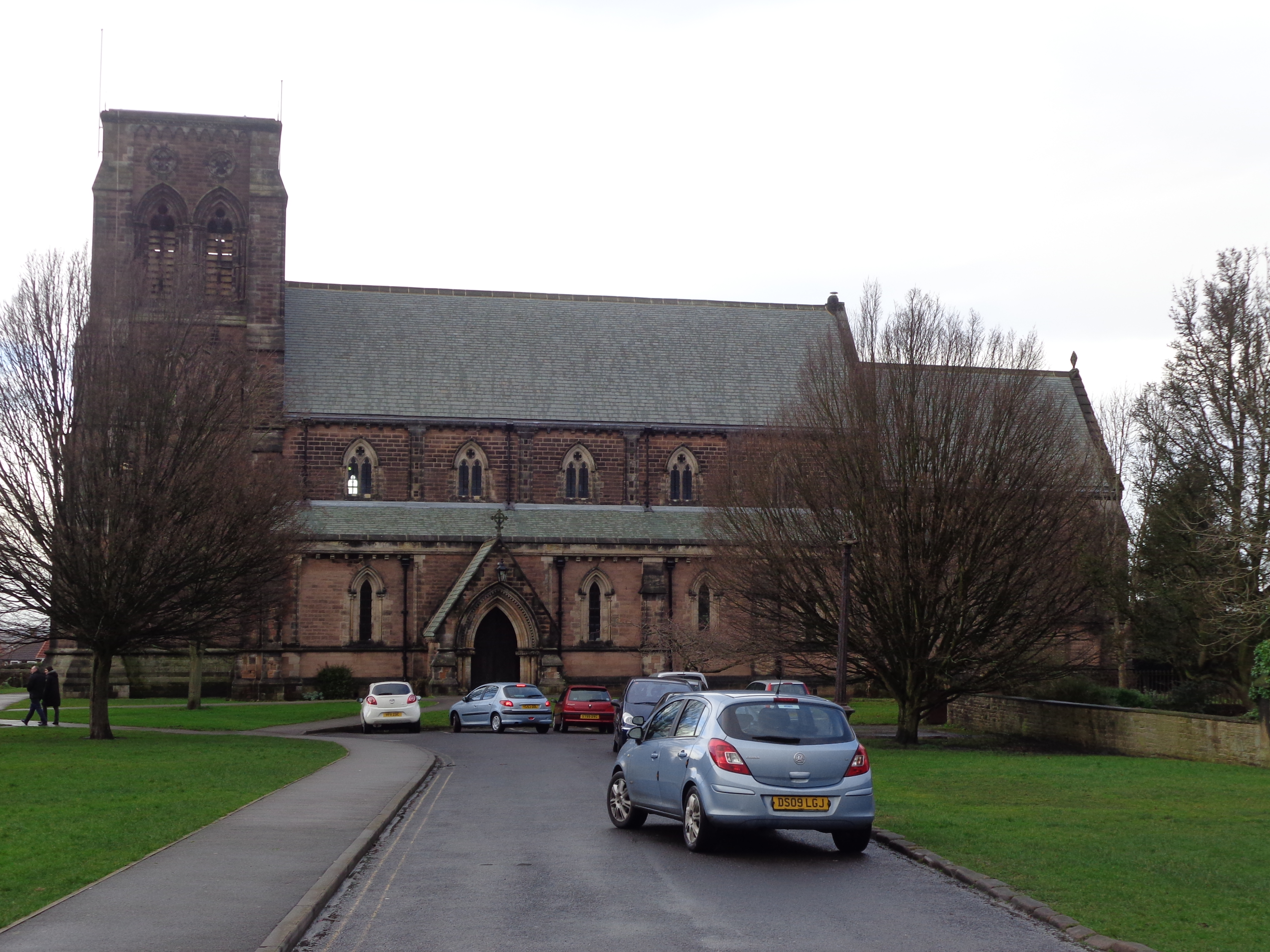
- St John the Evangelist Church

- Location within North Yorkshire
- Population: 5,409 (2011 census. Ward)
- OS grid reference: SE305572
- Civil parish: Harrogate
- Unitary authority: North Yorkshire
- Ceremonial county: North Yorkshire
- Region: Yorkshire and the Humber
- Country: England
- Sovereign state: United Kingdom
- Post town: HARROGATE
- Postcode district: HG1
- Police: North Yorkshire
- Fire: North Yorkshire
- Ambulance: Yorkshire

Bilton is a suburb of Harrogate, North Yorkshire, England, situated to the north-east of the town centre.

== History ==
Bilton was first recorded (as Billeton) in the Domesday Book in 1086. The name is of Old English origin and means "farmstead of a man named Billa".

Bilton was historically in the parish of Knaresborough in the West Riding of Yorkshire. It formed a township with Harrogate, and in 1866 the township of Bilton with Harrogate became a civil parish. When Harrogate became a municipal borough in 1894, Bilton remained outside the borough and became a separate civil parish on 31 December. In 1896, Starbeck was separated from Bilton to form a new civil parish. On 1 April 1938 the civil parish was abolished, and most of Bilton was added to Harrogate, part also went to Knaresborough. In 1931 the parish had a population of 447. From 1974 to 2023 it was part of the Borough of Harrogate. It is now administered by the unitary North Yorkshire Council.

In 1848 the Leeds and Thirsk Railway was opened through Bilton, although no station was built there. The line crossed the River Nidd on the northern boundary of Bilton by a stone viaduct. In 1908 the Harrogate Gasworks Railway was constructed from the main line to carry coal to the gasworks next to the Little Wonder roundabout. The line was closed in 1956, and with the tracks having been removed the only remains of the line are some walls and the tunnels that carried the trains. A small museum was opened in the neighbouring New Park School, where the line used to come out above ground. Between 2007 and 2008 the school created a garden, known as "The Secret Railway Garden", to commemorate the line.

The area of Bilton west of the railway line was developed in the 19th and 20th centuries. The parish church, St John's Church, Bilton, designed by Gilbert Scott, was built between 1851 and 1857. It is now a Grade II* listed building.

The area east of the railway has remained rural, with scattered houses now known as Old Bilton. The main railway line through Bilton was closed in 1969. In 2013 it was reopened as a cycle way and bridleway known as the Nidderdale Greenway.

Bilton Hall is a large former country house lying to the east of Old Bilton on a hill facing Knaresborough. Built on the site of a hunting lodge constructed on the orders of John O'Gaunt in 1380. William Slingsby, who discovered the first spa well in Harrogate, once resided at the Hall. Bilton Hall became the seat of the Stockdale family from 1631, with three members of that family serving as Members of Parliament for Knaresborough. It later passed into institutional use and is now a care home.

== Community ==
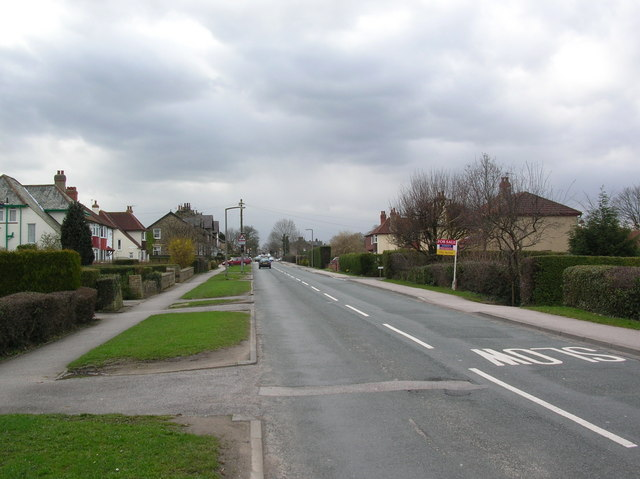
Bilton Lane

Prior to the gala ending in the late 2010s, on the first May Bank Holiday each year the Bilton Gala took place. The first Gala was held in 1977 and the event, which was attended by local families, raised money for groups and organisations within the local community.

Bilton has three churches, four primary schools and its own library. There are a number of shops, including seven convenience stores. The Library closed but has now re-opened on the site of Woodfield Primary School (School now closed, as of December 2022; but the library remains open). Bilton has its own online community page, called the Bilton Community Group on Facebook. Started in lockdown to bring a larger 'sense of community to the area’ and currently hosting over 7000 members.

There are three public houses: the Gardeners Arms, in Old Bilton, Bilton Club (formerly Bilton Working Men’s Club) on Skipton Road and the Knox. The Skipton (formerly the Dragon) on Skipton Road closed in February 2014 and re-opened as a Co-op Convenience Store. The Red Cat Cottage (formerly Red Cat Inn), a Grade II listed building is located in the area. It is situated close to the Nidd Gorge conservation area.

== Transport ==
Roads out of Bilton lead to Skipton Road, the major artery across northern Harrogate, resulting in very heavy congestion at peak times, and heavy traffic throughout the day.

The number 2 bus route runs between Bilton and Harrogate bus station. Previously split into two routes for the Woodfield side and the Knox Side, the routes were merged in early 2023 much to the residents' dismay.

A railway station is proposed on the Harrogate Line at Bilton.
