= Arnold Shaw =

Arnold Shaw may refer to:

- Arnold Shaw (politician) (1909–1984), British politician
- Arnold Shaw (writer) (1909–1989), American music writer
- Arnold Shaw (cricketer), English cricketer and British Army officer
