= Harrogate =

Town in North Yorkshire, England

Coordinates: 53°59′31″N 01°32′16″W

- Town
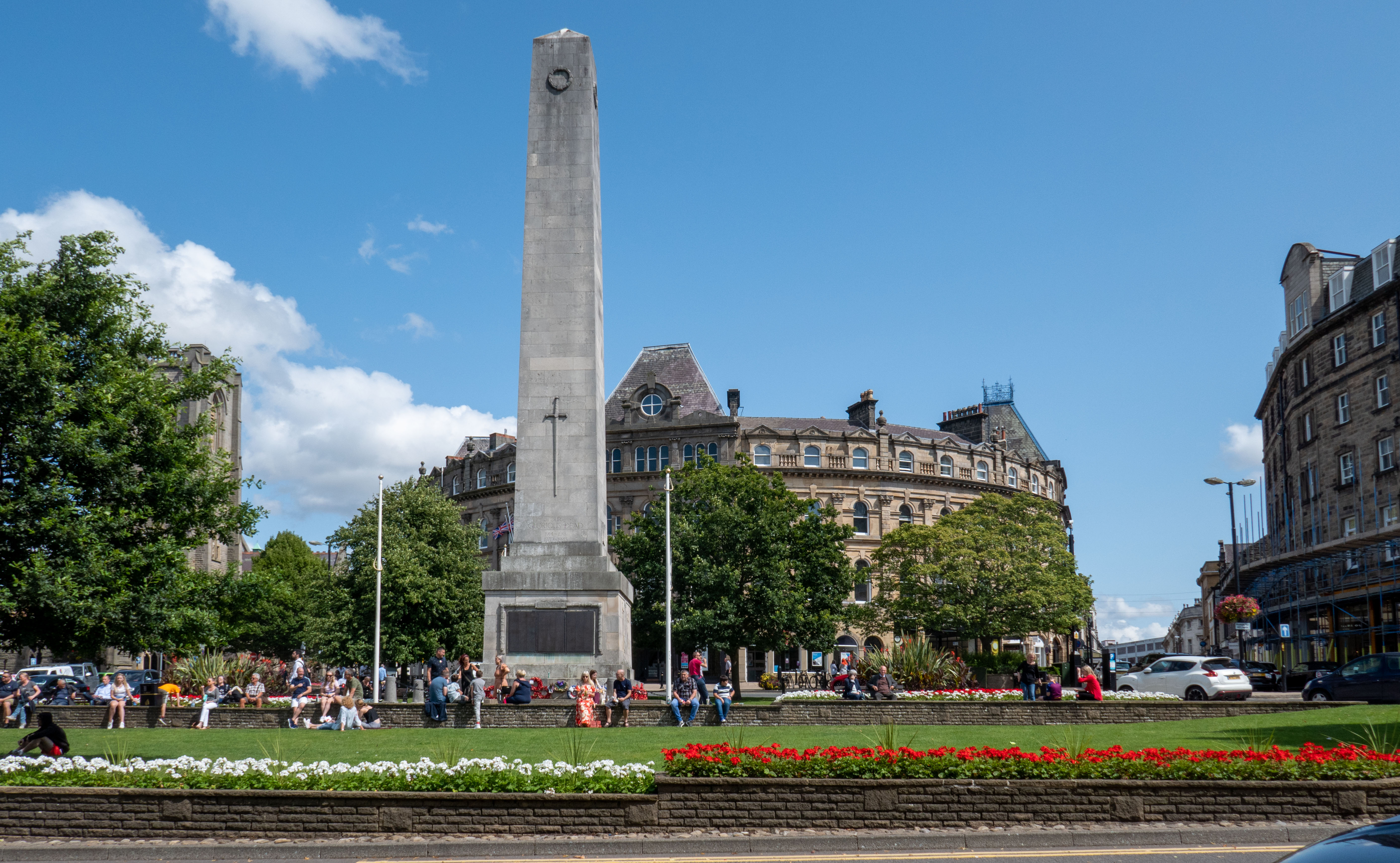
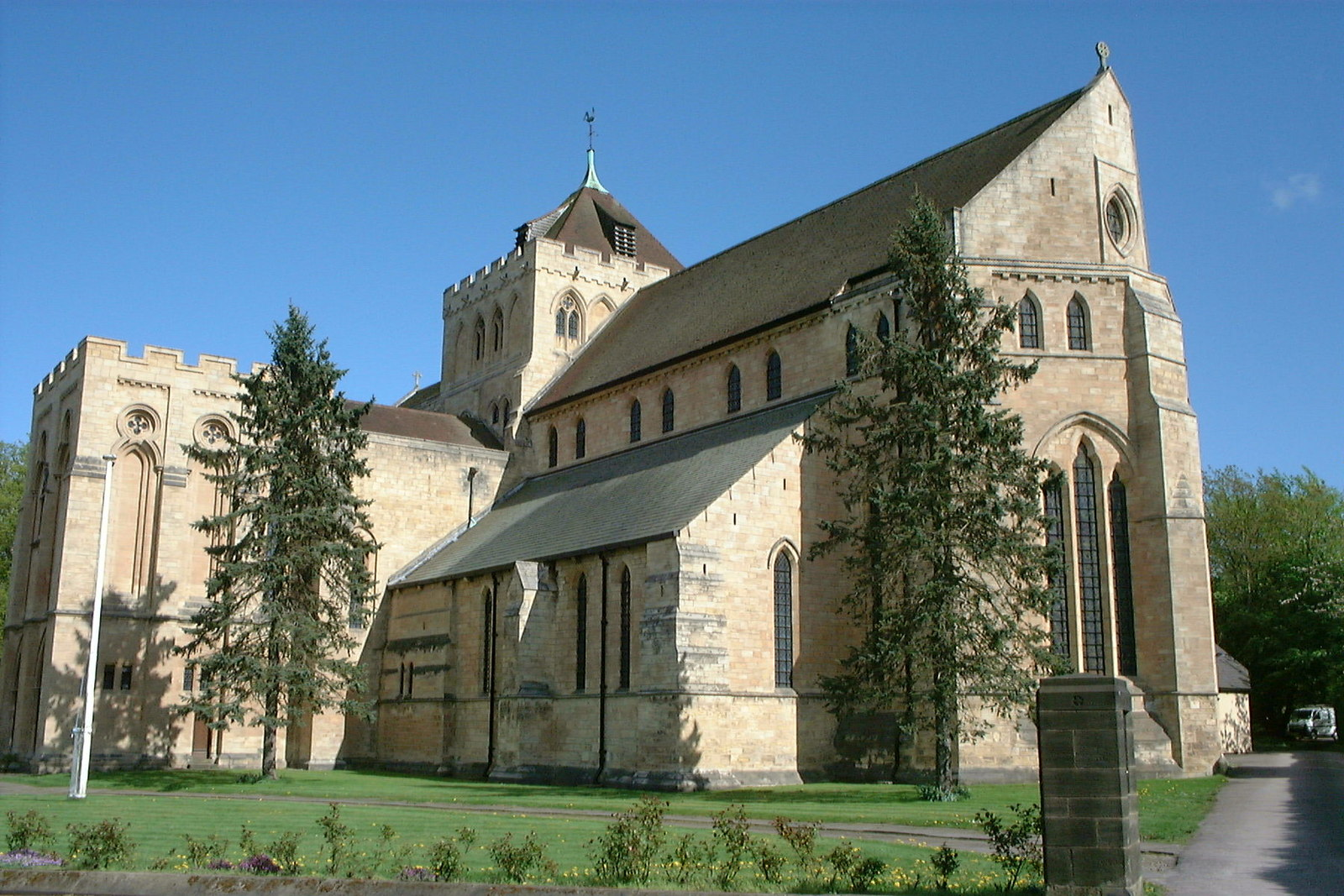
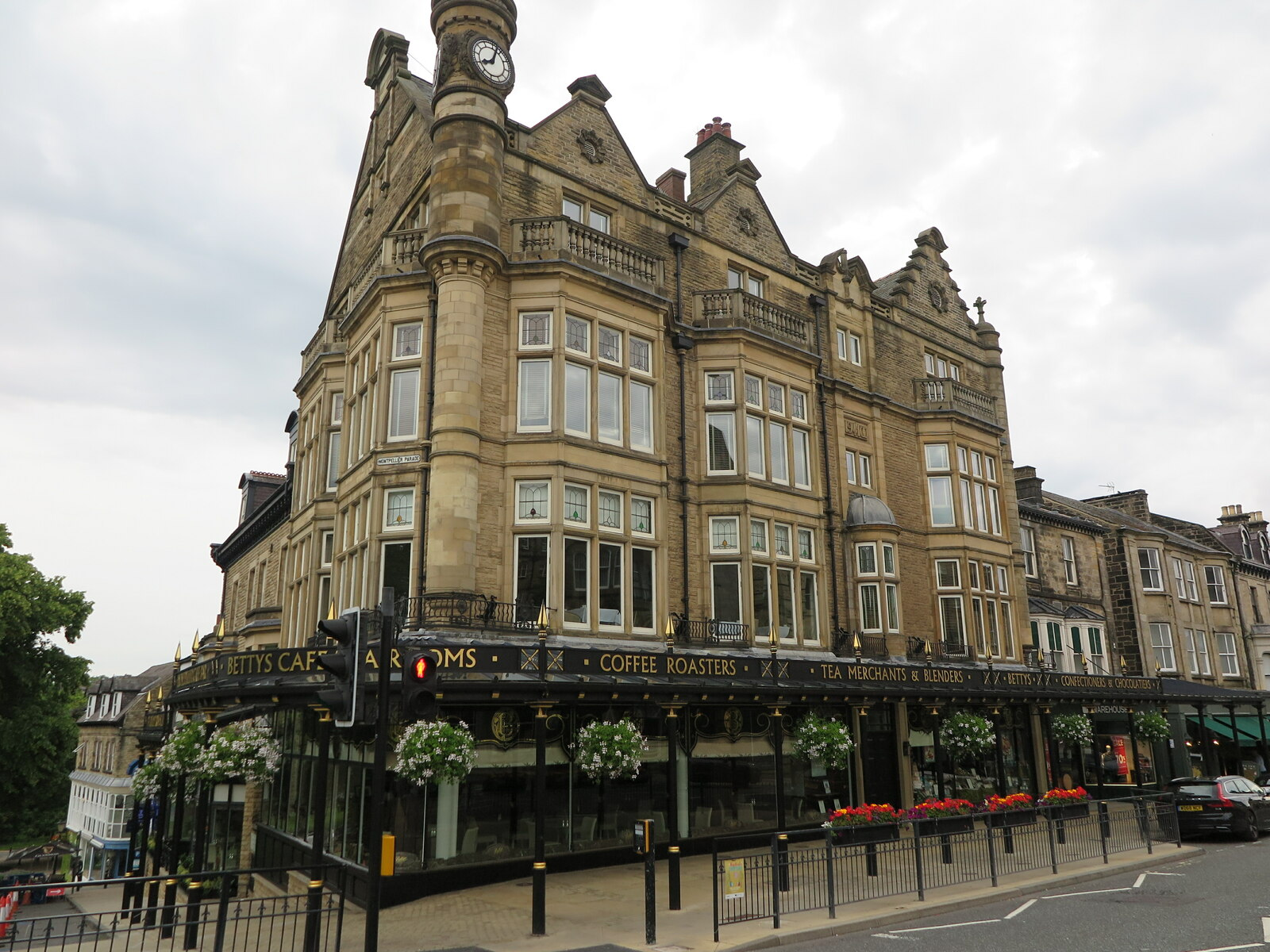
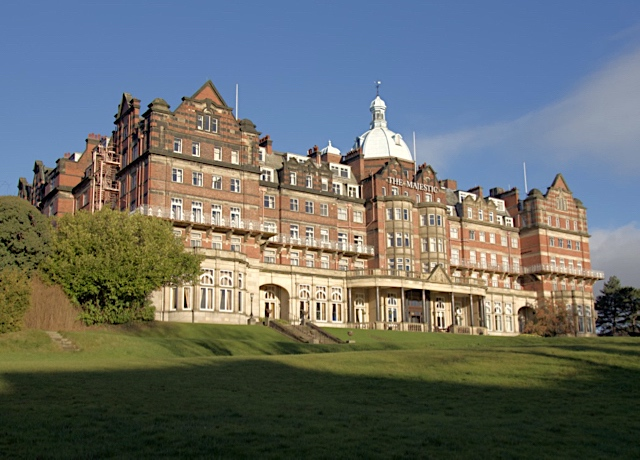
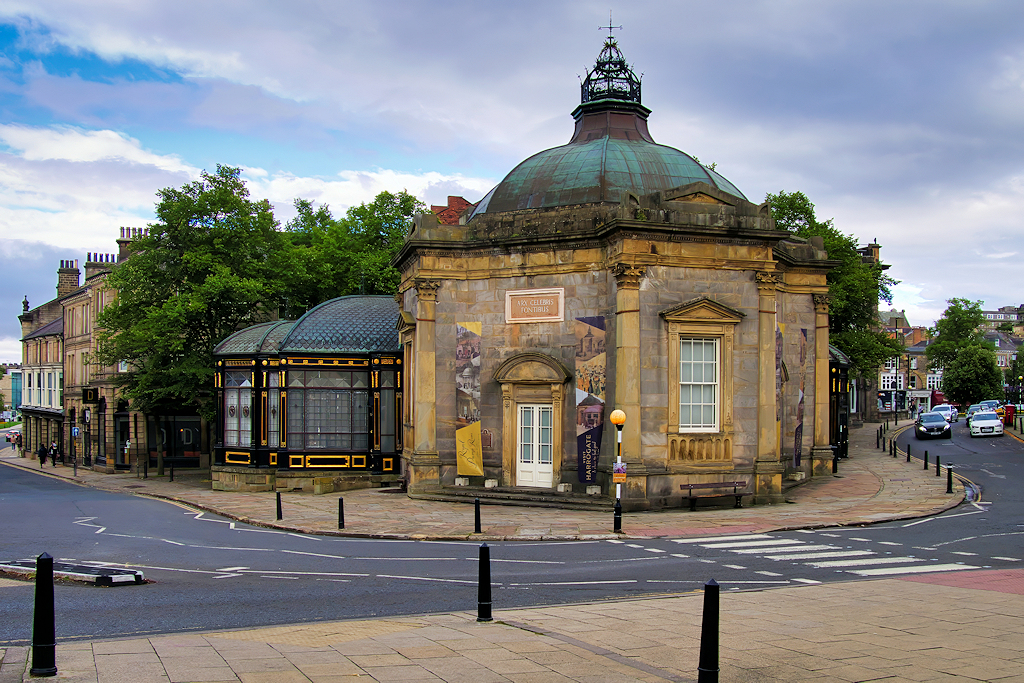
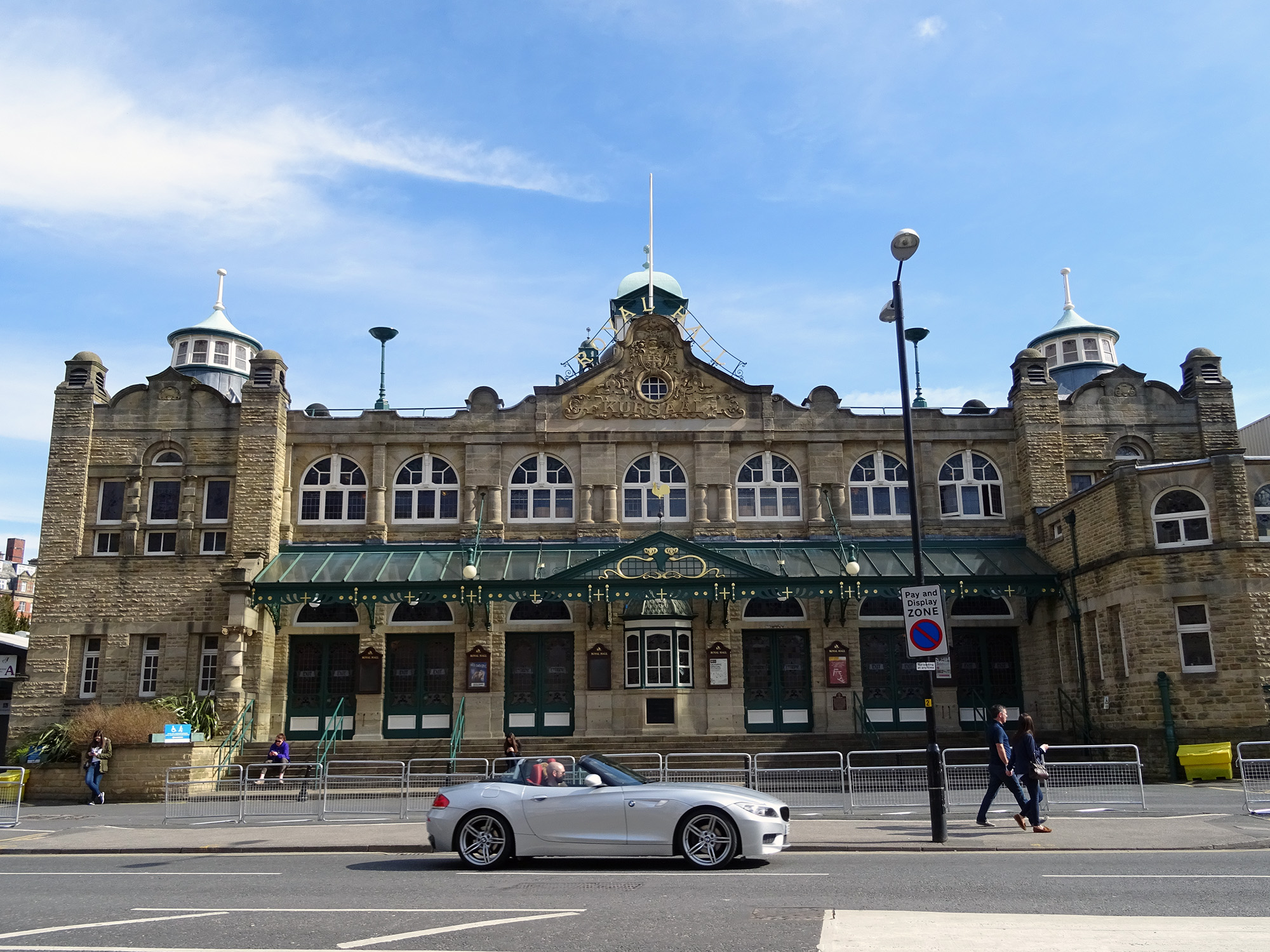
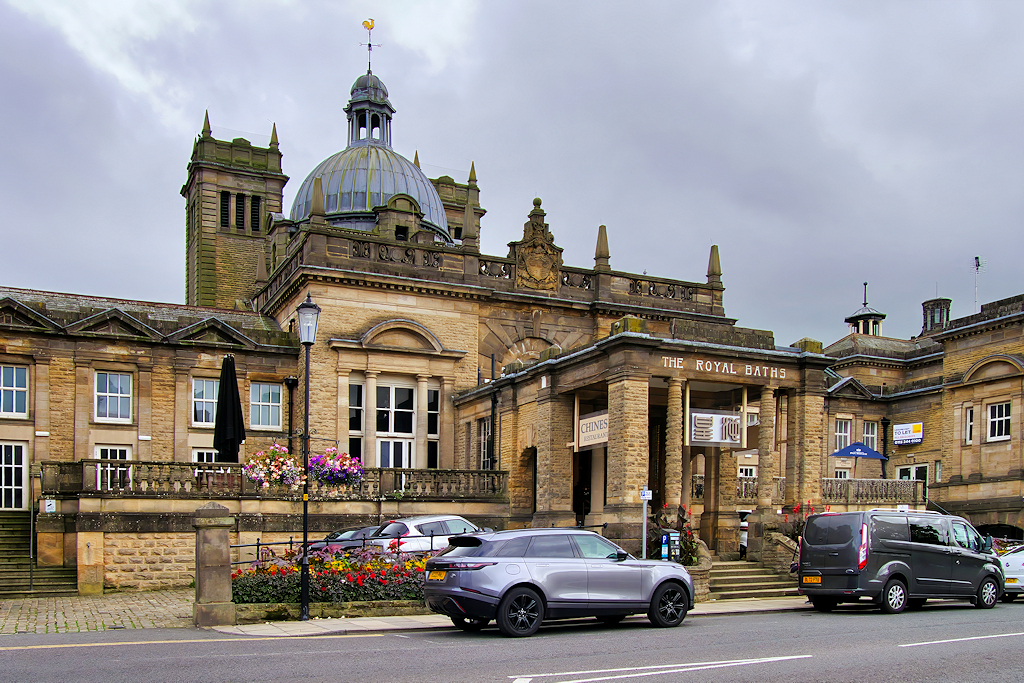
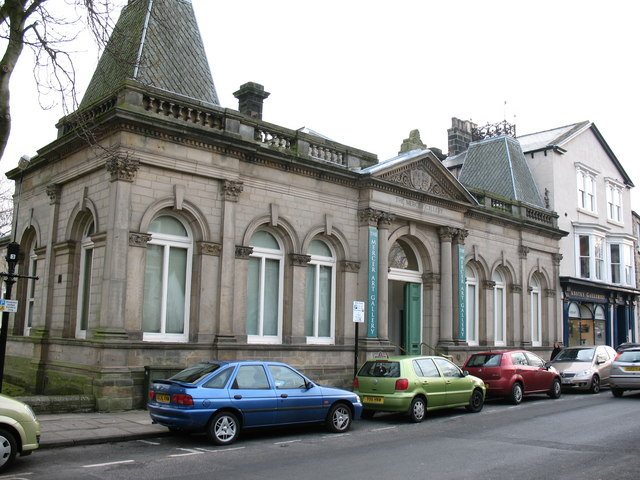
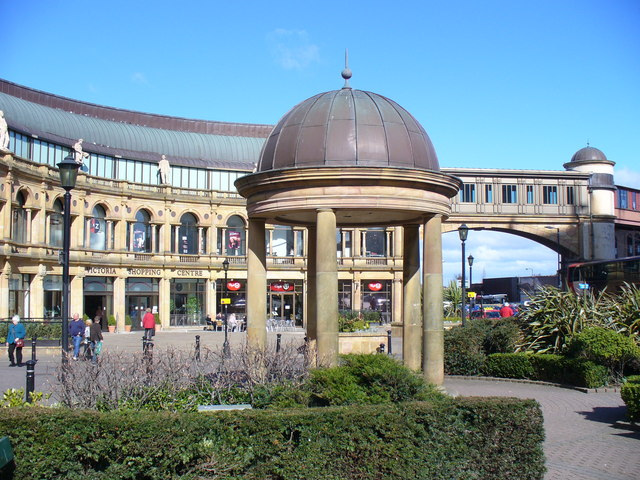
- Harrogate Cenotaph St Wilfrid's Church Bettys Tearoom Majestic Hotel Royal Pump Room The Kursaal Royal Bath Mercer Gallery Victoria Shopping Centre

- Location within North Yorkshire
- Population: 75,070 (mid-2016 ONS estimate)
- OS grid reference: SE303550
  - London: 180 mi (290 km) SSE
- Civil parish: Harrogate
- Unitary authority: North Yorkshire
- Ceremonial county: North Yorkshire
- Region: Yorkshire and the Humber
- Country: England
- Sovereign state: United Kingdom
- Areas of the town: List: Bilton; Harlow Hill; Oatlands; Starbeck
- Post town: HARROGATE
- Postcode district: HG1, HG2, HG3
- Dialling code: 01423
- Police: North Yorkshire
- Fire: North Yorkshire
- Ambulance: Yorkshire
- UK Parliament: Harrogate and Knaresborough
- Website: www.northyorks.gov.uk

Harrogate (/ˈhærəɡət, -ɡeɪt, -ɡɪt/) is a spa town and civil parish in North Yorkshire, England, historically part of the West Riding of Yorkshire.

It developed as a spa resort after the discovery of its mineral waters in the 16th century, becoming a fashionable destination during the Georgian era. Its historic spa heritage remains an important part of the town's identity, alongside its gardens, architecture and cultural attractions.

In the 17th century, Harrogate grew out of two smaller settlements, High Harrogate and Low Harrogate. The town became known as 'The English Spa' in the Georgian era, famous for its chalybeate waters containing iron, sulphur, and common salt (NaCl). In the 17th and 18th centuries these waters a popular health treatment, and the influx of wealthy but sickly visitors contributed significantly to the wealth of the town.

Visitor attractions include Bettys tea rooms, RHS Harlow Carr gardens and the Royal Pump Room Museum, which explores the town's spa heritage. The Yorkshire Dales National Park and Nidderdale AONB are 13 miles (21 km) from the town centre. For three consecutive years (2013–2015), polls voted the town as "the happiest place to live" in Britain.

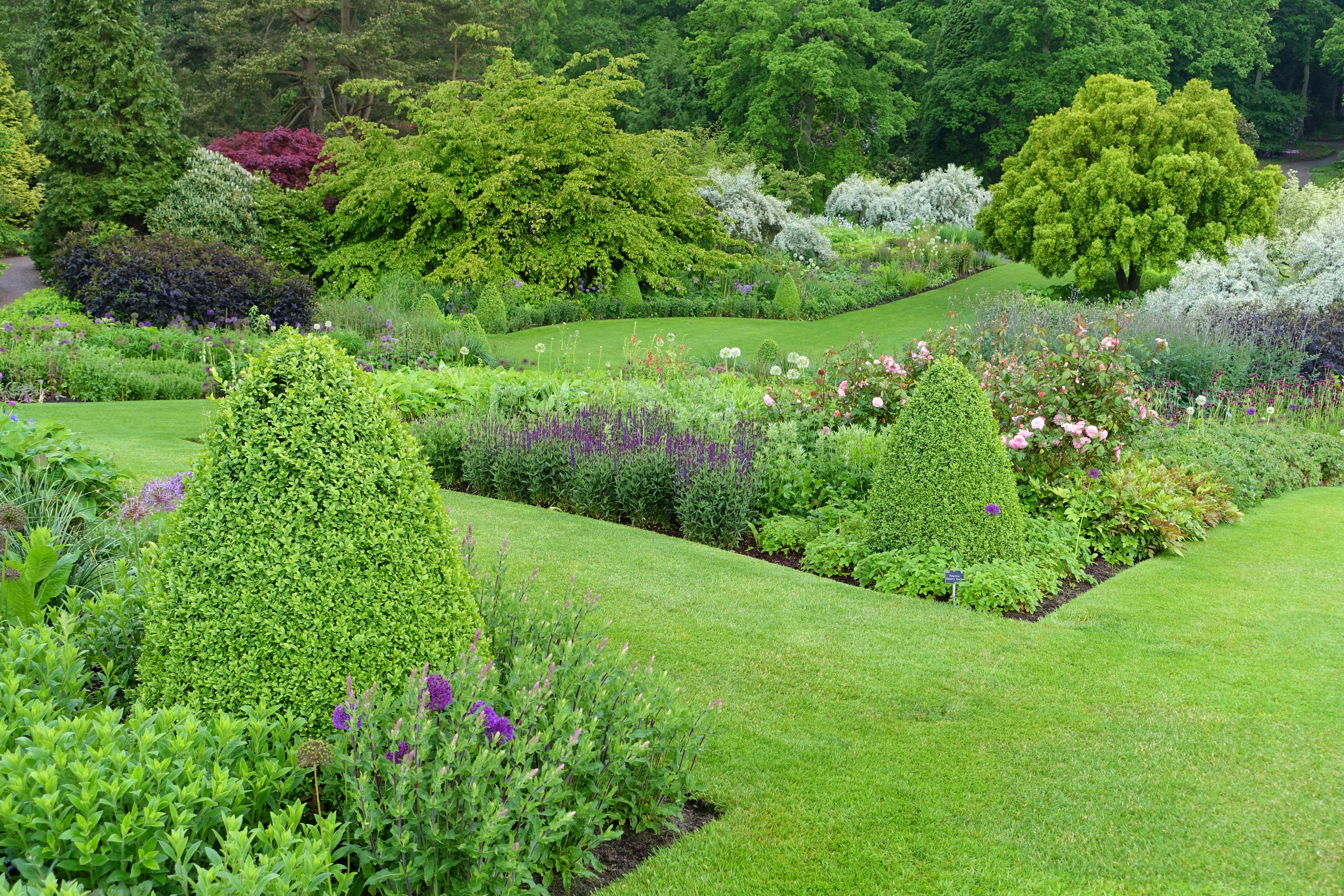
RHS Garden Harlow Carr

Harrogate railway station and Harrogate bus station in the town centre provide transport connections. Leeds Bradford Airport is 10 miles (16 km) southwest of Harrogate. The main roads through the town are the A61, connecting Harrogate to Leeds and Ripon, and the A59, connecting the town to York and Skipton. Harrogate is also connected to Wetherby and the A1(M) by the A661, while the A658 from Bradford forms a bypass around the south of the town. Harrogate had a population of 73,576 at the 2011 UK census; the built-up area comprising Harrogate and nearby Knaresborough had a population of 89,060, while the figure for the much wider Borough of Harrogate, comprising Harrogate, Knaresborough, Ripon, as well as a number of smaller settlements and a large rural area, was 157,869.

The town motto is Arx celebris fontibus, which means "a citadel famous for its springs".

== Toponym ==
The name Harrogate is first attested in the 1330s as Harwegate, Harougat and Harrowgate. The origin of the name is uncertain. It may derive from Old Norse hǫrgr 'a heap of stones, cairn' + gata 'street', in which case the name presumably meant 'road to the cairn'. Another possibility is that the name means "the way to Harlow". The form Harlowgate is known from 1518, and apparently in the court rolls of Edward II.

== History ==
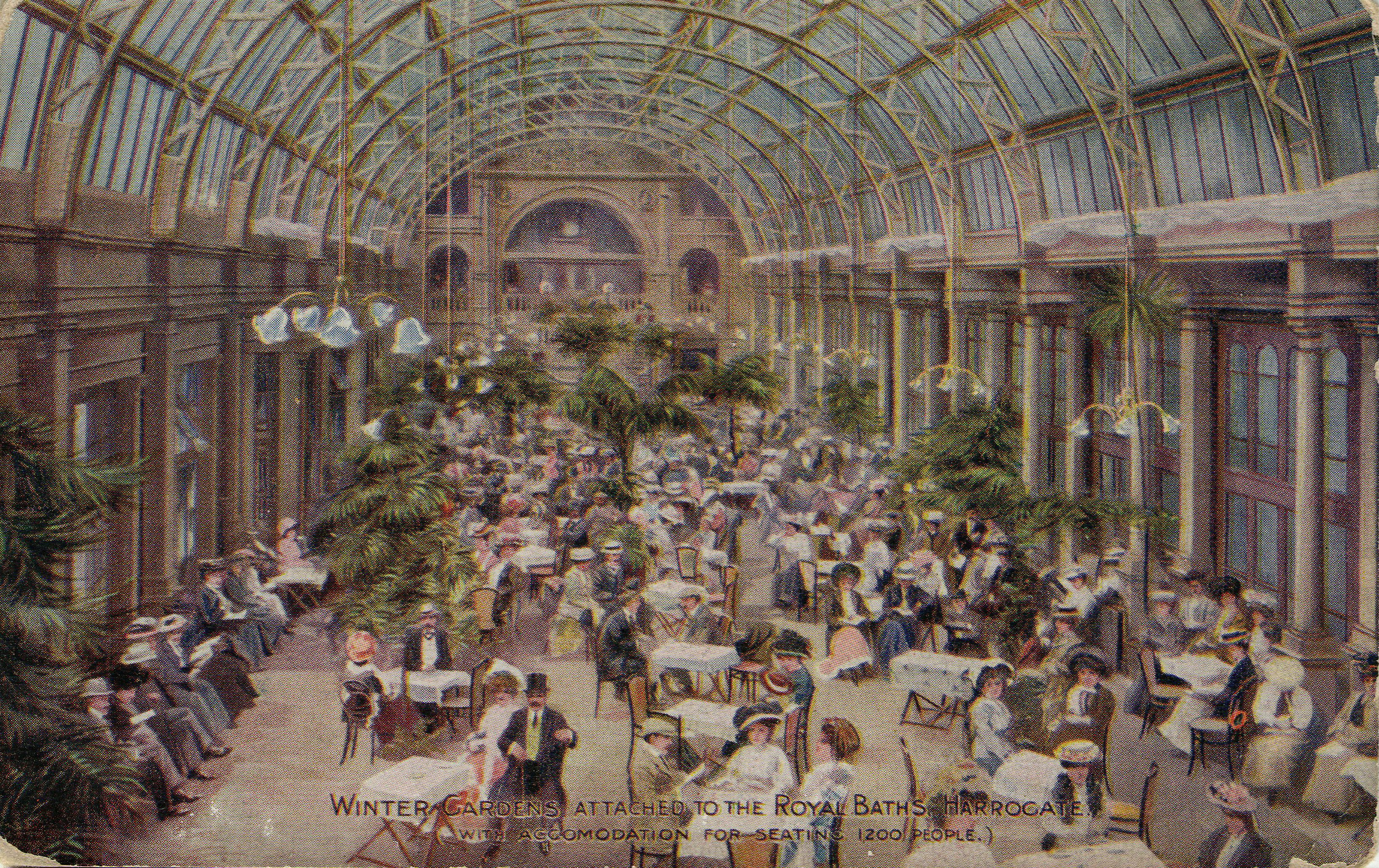
Opened in 1897, The Winter Gardens Baths are historically one of the town's most famous landmarks. The building still stands and is now owned by North Yorkshire Council, however the premises are leased to JD Weatherspoon.

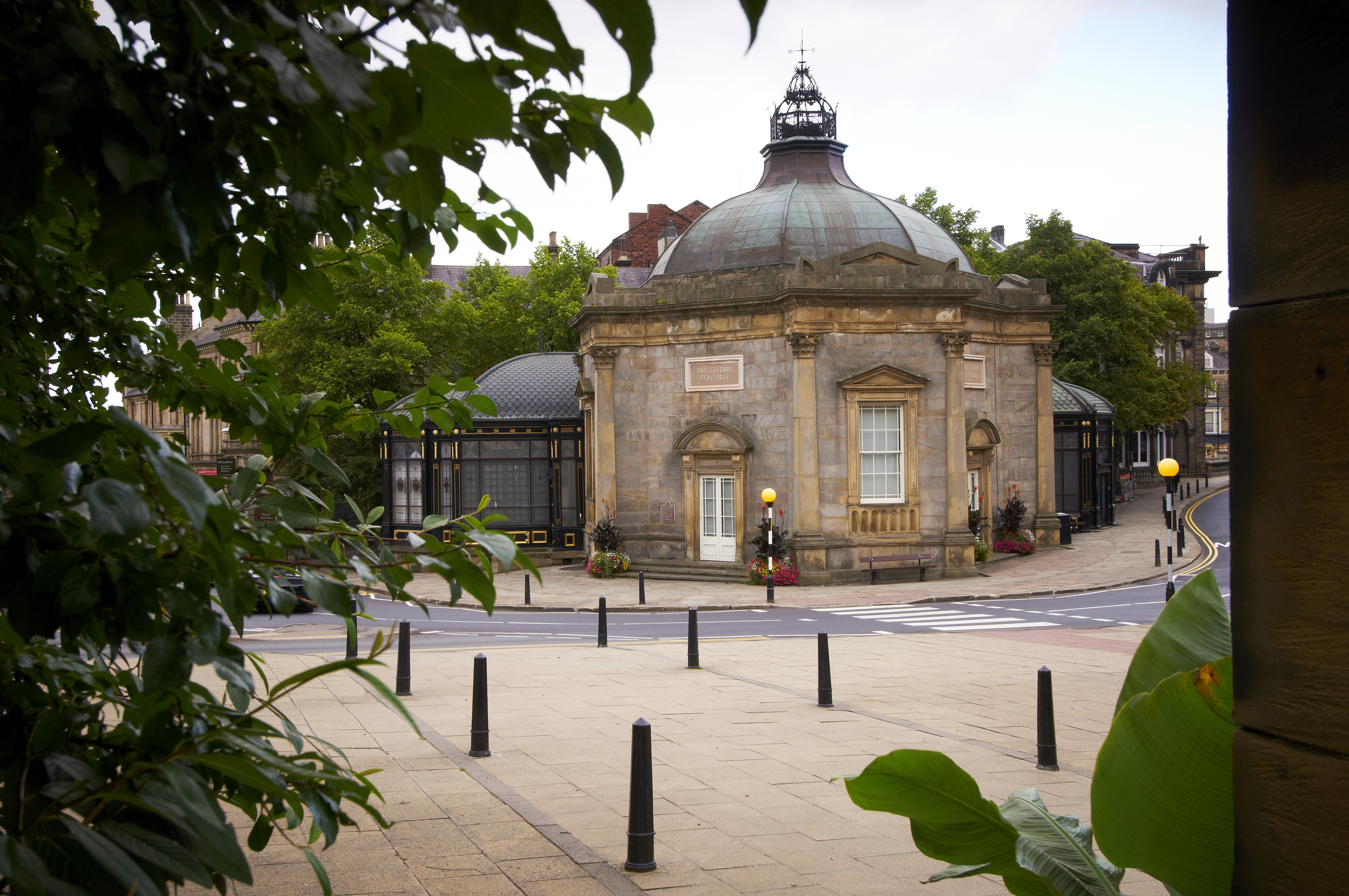
The Royal Pump Room

In medieval times Harrogate was a place on the boundary of the township of Bilton with Harrogate in the ancient parish of Knaresborough, and the parish of Pannal, also known as Beckwith with Rossett. The part within the township of Bilton developed into the community of Low Harrogate, and the part within Pannal developed into the community of High Harrogate. Both communities were within the Royal Forest of Knaresborough. In 1372 King Edward III granted the Royal Forest to his son John, Duke of Lancaster (also known as John of Gaunt), and the Duchy of Lancaster became the principal landowner in Harrogate.

Harrogate's development is due to the discovery of its chalybeate- and sulphur-rich spring water from the 16th century. The first mineral spring was discovered in 1571 by William Slingsby, who found that water from the Tewit Well in High Harrogate possessed similar properties to that from springs in the Belgian town of Spa, which gave its name to spa towns. The medicinal properties of the waters were publicised by Edmund Deane; his book, Spadacrene Anglica, or the English Spa Fountain was published in 1626.

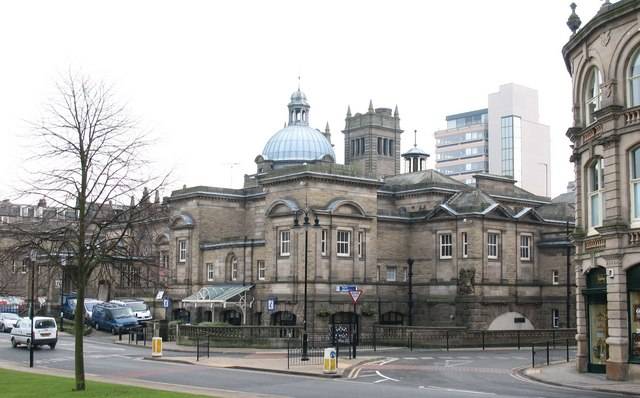
The Royal Bath House

In the 17th and 18th centuries further chalybeate springs were discovered in High Harrogate, and both chalybeate and sulphur springs were found in Low Harrogate. The two communities attracted many visitors. A number of inns were opened for visitors in High Harrogate in the 17th century (the Queen's Head, the Granby, the Dragon and the World's End). In Low Harrogate, the Crown Hotel was open by the mid-18th century, and possibly earlier.

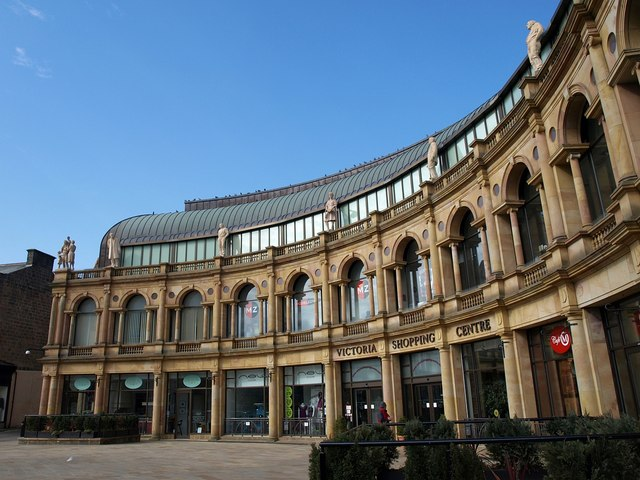
Victoria Shopping Centre

In accordance with the Forest of Knaresborough Inclosure Act 1770 (10 Geo. 3. c. 94 Pr.), promoted by the Duchy of Lancaster, the Royal Forest of Knaresborough was enclosed. The Enclosure award of 1778 clarified ownership of land in the Harrogate area. Under the award, 200 acres (81 ha) of land, which included the springs known at that time, were reserved as a public common, The Stray, which has remained public open space. The Enclosure Award facilitated development around the Stray. During the 19th century, the area between High Harrogate and Low Harrogate, which until then had remained two separate communities a mile apart, was developed, and what is now the central area of Harrogate was built on high ground overlooking Low Harrogate. An area to the north of the developing town was reserved to the Duchy of Lancaster, and was developed for residential building. To provide entertainment for the increasing numbers of visitors the Georgian Theatre was built in 1788. Bath Hospital (later the Royal Bath Hospital) was built in 1826. The Royal Pump Room was built in 1842. The site of Tewit Well is marked by a dome on the Stray. Other wells can be found in the Valley Gardens and Royal Pump Room museum.

In 1870, engineering inventor Samson Fox perfected the process of creating water gas, in the basement laboratory of Grove House. After constructing a trial plant at his home on Skipton Road, making it the first house in Yorkshire to have gas lighting and heating; he built a plant of suitable size to supply the whole town. When Parliament Street became the world's first route to be lit by water-gas, newspapers commented: "Samson Fox has captured the sunlight for Harrogate." After donating the town's first fire engine, and building the town's theatre, he was elected mayor for three successive years (1890–92), a record never equalled since.

In 1893, Harrogate doctor George Oliver was the first to observe the effect of adrenaline on circulation.

Like many spa towns all over Europe, Harrogate's popularity declined after the First World War. During the Second World War, Harrogate's large hotels accommodated government offices evacuated from London, paving the way for the town to become a commercial, conference, and exhibition centre.

Former employers in the town were the Central Electricity Generating Board (CEGB), the Milk Marketing Board and ICI who occupied offices and laboratories at Hornbeam Park where Crimplene was invented in the 1950s and named after the nearby Crimple Valley and beck.

In 2007, two metal detectorists found the Harrogate hoard, a 10th-century Viking treasure hoard, near Harrogate. The hoard contains almost 700 coins and other items from as far away as Afghanistan. The hoard was described by the British Museum as the most important find of its type in Britain for 150 years.

== Governance ==
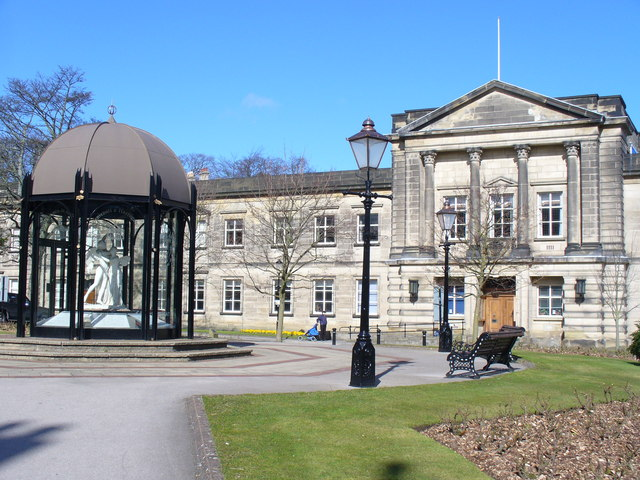
Harrogate Council Offices

In 1884 the Municipal Borough of Harrogate was created, taking High Harrogate from the civil parish of Bilton with Harrogate and Low Harrogate from the civil parish of Pannal, from 1894 the district contained only the parish of Harrogate. The borough absorbed neighbouring areas in subsequent years, including the whole of the civil parishes of Bilton and Starbeck, and a large part of the civil parish of Pannal, including the village of Pannal, in 1938. The municipal borough and parish were abolished on 1 April 1974, when Harrogate was transferred from the West Riding to North Yorkshire and became part of the wider non-metropolitan district of Harrogate. No successor parish was formed so it became an unparished area, with no local government of its own.

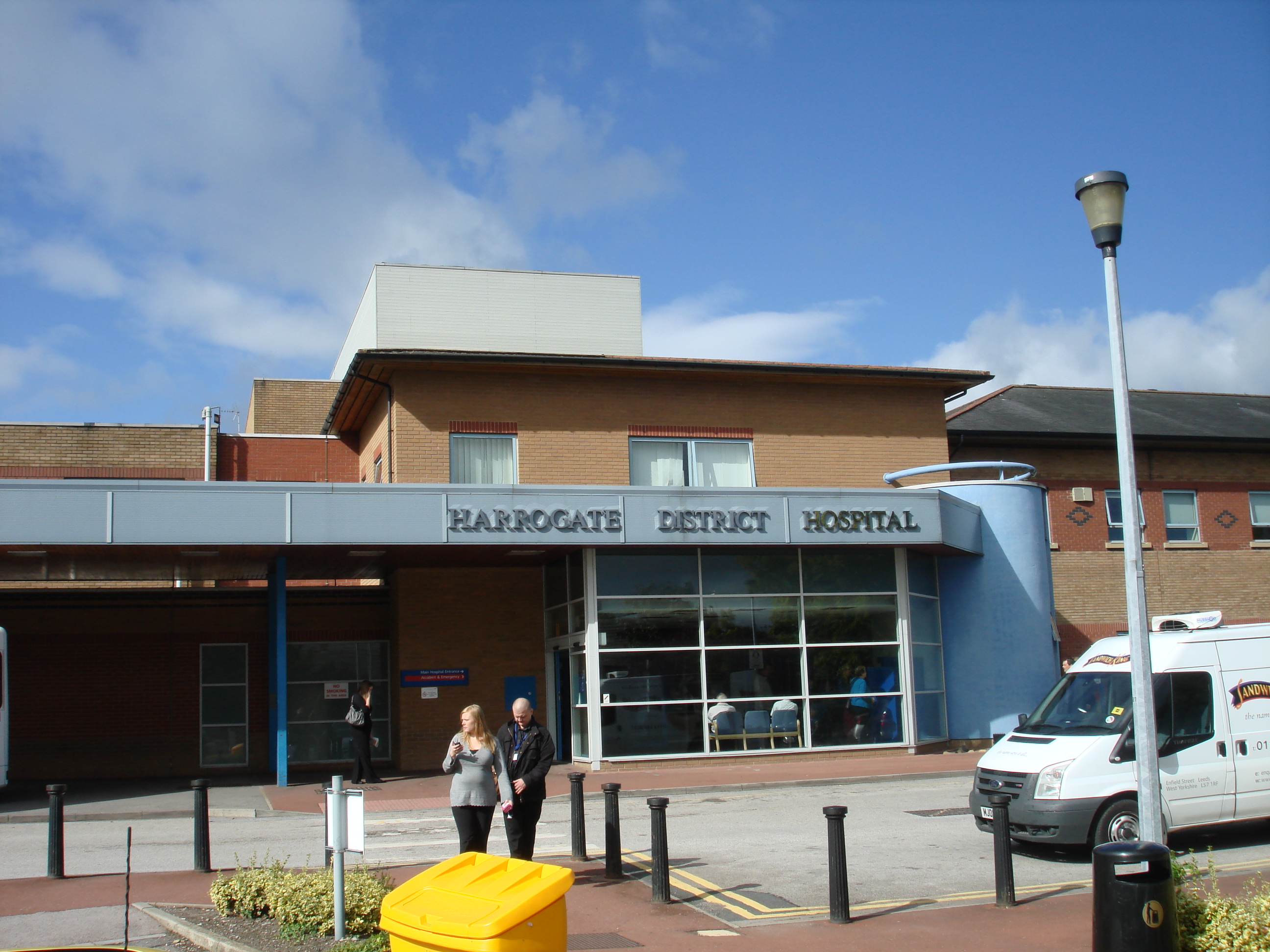
Harrogate District Hospital

On 1 April 2016 a new civil parish was formed in the south of the unparished area for Pannal and the neighbouring village of Burn Bridge, known as Pannal and Burn Bridge.

The MP for the Harrogate and Knaresborough constituency is Tom Gordon, a Liberal Democrat. He was elected in 2024, ousting the incumbent Conservative who had served since 2010. On 1 April 2023 Harrogate district was abolished and became part of North Yorkshire unitary authority area, a charter trustees was formed.

The remaining unparished area of Harrogate was subsequently reparished, on 1 April 2025 with a town council with the charter trustees moved to the town council, which was elected on 1 May 2025 with a Liberal Democrat majority and met for the first time on 15 May. In June 2025 the town council resolved to apply for the transfer of the armorial bearings of the Municipal Borough of Harrogate granted in 1884 and which been out of use since 1974. In November 2025 the town council was granted a royal licence to use the 1884 arms.

=== Twin towns ===
The Borough of Harrogate was twinned with:

- Bagnères-de-Luchon, France (since 1953)
- Barrie, Canada (since 2013)
- Montecatini Terme, Italy (since 1963)
- Wellington, New Zealand (since 1953)

== Geography ==
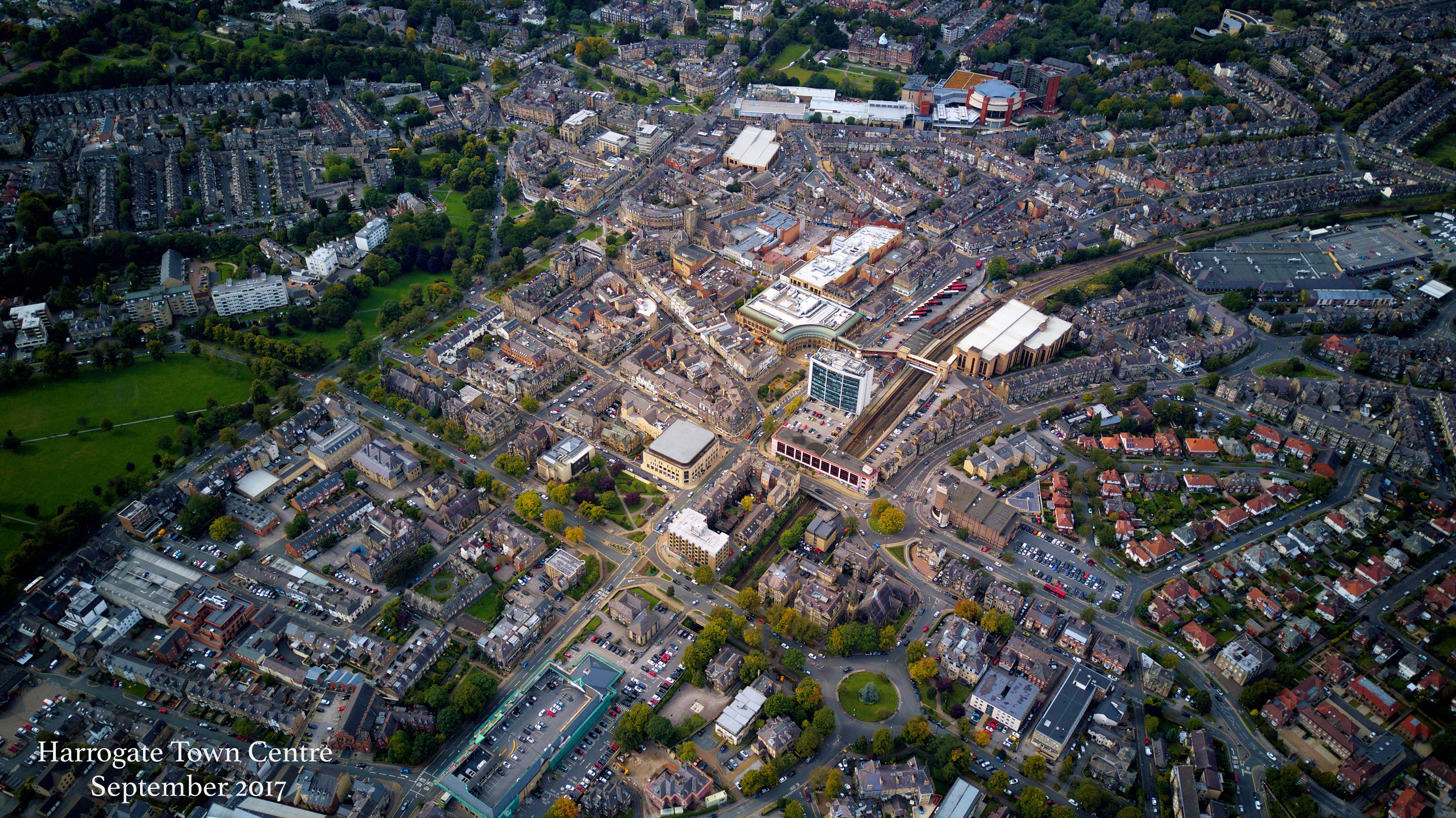
Harrogate centre

The town has good commuter services for people who work in the City of Leeds, City of Bradford, York and North Yorkshire in general. Harrogate is prosperous and has some of the highest property prices in England, with many properties in the town and surrounding villages valued at £1 million or more, it is generally considered the most expensive place to live in the North of England. Fulwith Mill Lane in Harrogate is the most expensive street in Yorkshire.

Harrogate is situated on the edge of the Yorkshire Dales, with the Vale of York to the east and the upland Yorkshire Dales to the west and north-west. It has a dry and mild climate, typical of places in the rain shadow of the Pennines. It is on the A59 from Skipton to York. At an altitude of between 100 and 200 metres (330 and 660 ft), Harrogate is higher than many English settlements. It has an average minimum temperature in January of slightly below 1 °C (34 °F) and an average maximum in July and August of 21 °C (70 °F).

=== Climate ===
Harrogate's climate is classified as warm and temperate. Rain can occur at any time of year, though precipitation tends to be light. There are significantly more dry days than those with precipitation. In a year, the average rainfall is 671 millimetres (26.4 in). The Köppen-Geiger climate classification is Cfb. The average annual temperature in Harrogate is 9.7 °C (49.5 °F).

The highest temperature on record between 1959 and 2003 in Harrogate was 33.1 °C (91.6 °F) on 2 August 1990 and the lowest was −16.9 °C (1.6 °F) on 18 December 1981.

Climate data for Harrogate (1991-2020, extremes 1959-2003)
| Month | Jan | Feb | Mar | Apr | May | Jun | Jul | Aug | Sep | Oct | Nov | Dec | Year |
|---|---|---|---|---|---|---|---|---|---|---|---|---|---|
| Record high °C (°F) | 14.0 (57.2) | 16.8 (62.2) | 22.2 (72.0) | 22.1 (71.8) | 27.1 (80.8) | 30.1 (86.2) | 29.6 (85.3) | 33.1 (91.6) | 26.2 (79.2) | 25.6 (78.1) | 17.4 (63.3) | 16.0 (60.8) | 33.1 (91.6) |
| Mean daily maximum °C (°F) | 7.0 (44.6) | 7.9 (46.2) | 10.2 (50.4) | 13.1 (55.6) | 16.1 (61.0) | 19.0 (66.2) | 21.3 (70.3) | 20.7 (69.3) | 17.9 (64.2) | 13.9 (57.0) | 9.8 (49.6) | 7.2 (45.0) | 13.7 (56.6) |
| Mean daily minimum °C (°F) | 1.1 (34.0) | 1.1 (34.0) | 2.2 (36.0) | 3.9 (39.0) | 6.6 (43.9) | 9.5 (49.1) | 11.5 (52.7) | 11.4 (52.5) | 9.3 (48.7) | 6.6 (43.9) | 3.3 (37.9) | 1.0 (33.8) | 5.6 (42.1) |
| Record low °C (°F) | −16.0 (3.2) | −13.9 (7.0) | −12.8 (9.0) | −5.2 (22.6) | −2.3 (27.9) | −0.7 (30.7) | 2.8 (37.0) | 2.2 (36.0) | −0.2 (31.6) | −4.8 (23.4) | −7.9 (17.8) | −16.9 (1.6) | −16.9 (1.6) |
| Average precipitation mm (inches) | 54.7 (2.15) | 45.6 (1.80) | 41.8 (1.65) | 46.0 (1.81) | 46.5 (1.83) | 58.3 (2.30) | 58.0 (2.28) | 66.2 (2.61) | 57.2 (2.25) | 66.5 (2.62) | 68.4 (2.69) | 61.8 (2.43) | 671 (26.42) |
| Average precipitation days | 11.9 | 10.2 | 9.1 | 8.7 | 9.4 | 9.7 | 9.7 | 10.3 | 8.9 | 11.2 | 12.3 | 12.2 | 123.6 |
| Mean monthly sunshine hours | 65.7 | 79.7 | 114.5 | 166.9 | 197.9 | 166.4 | 188.5 | 172.6 | 135.6 | 95.3 | 61.2 | 47.4 | 1,491.7 |
Source 1: Met Office
Source 2: Starlings Roost Weather

=== Divisions ===
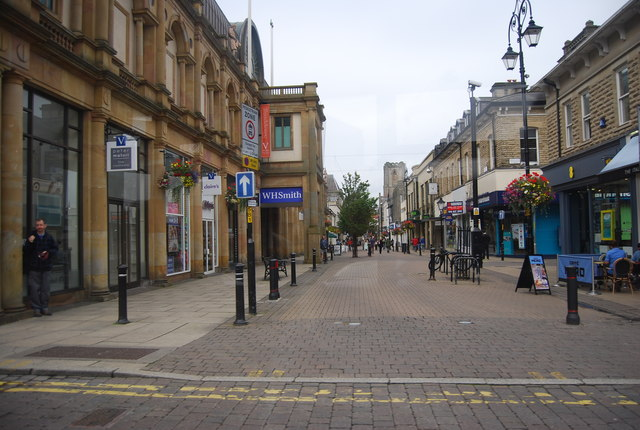
Cambridge Street

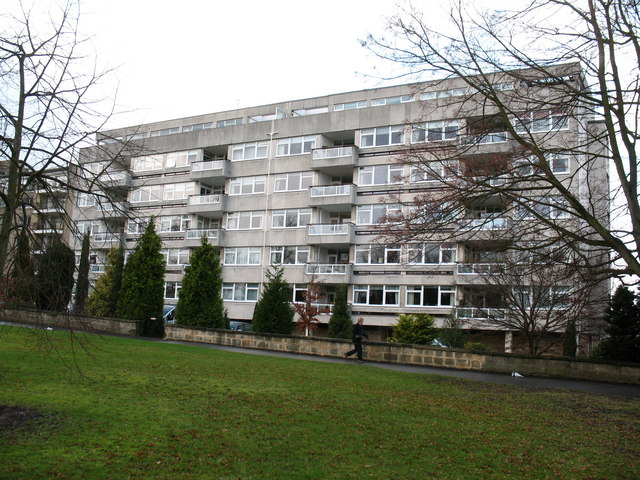
Apartment block on West Park

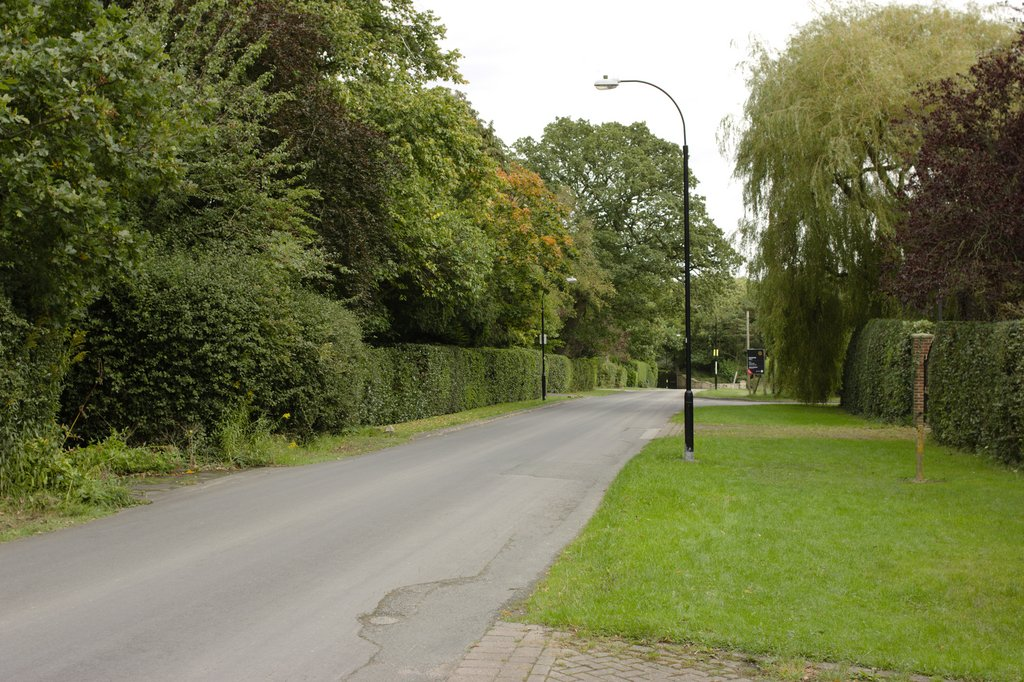
Fulwith Mill Lane

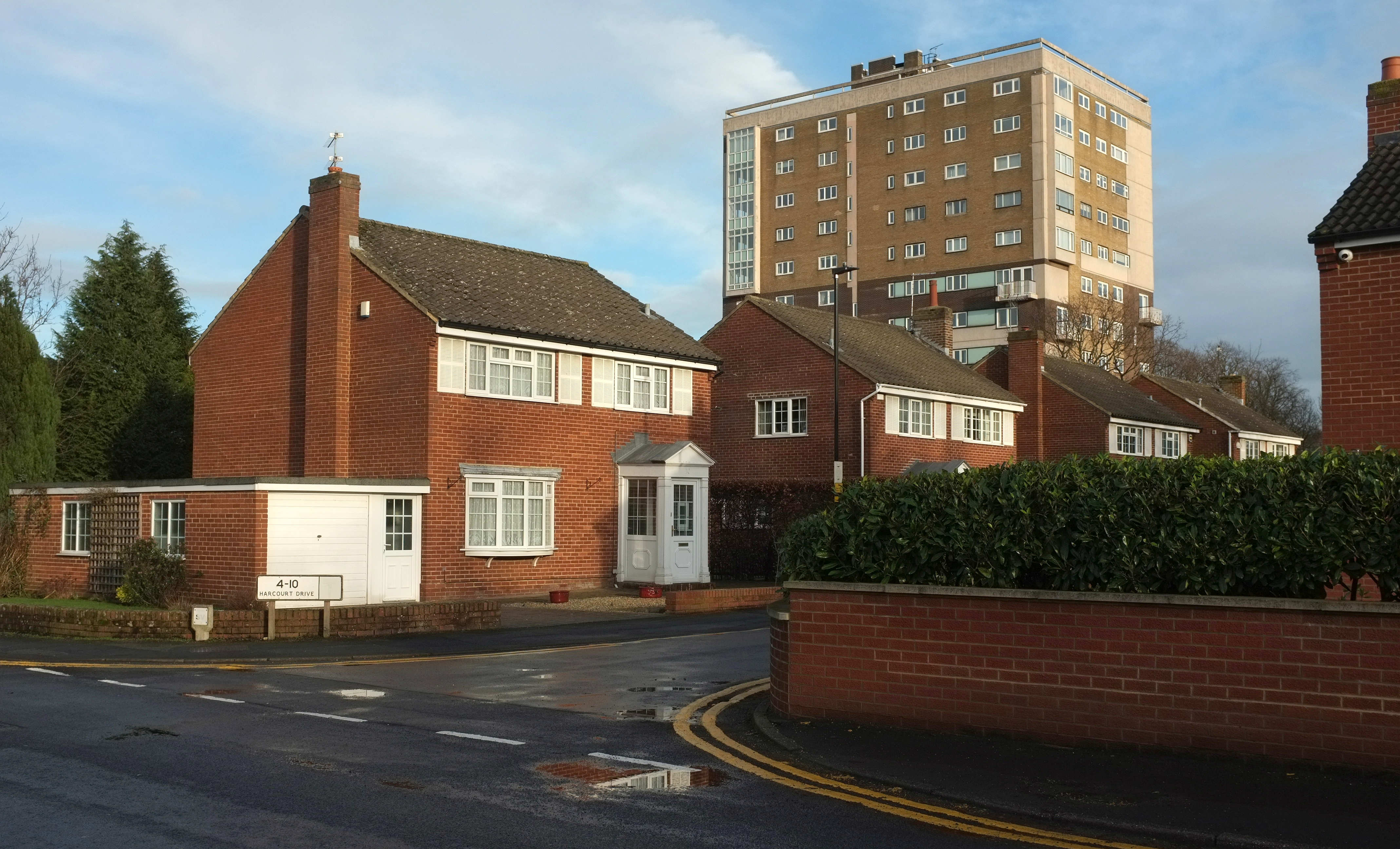
Harcourt Drive

- Central Harrogate is bounded by 'the Stray' or 'Two Hundred acres' to the south and west, and borders High Harrogate and the Duchy estate to the east and north respectively. It is a district centre for retail and the Victoria Shopping Centre houses a number of major chains. Pedestrianised Cambridge Street and Oxford Street are the main high streets, and Harrogate Theatre is on Oxford Street. Parliament Street, Montpellier and James Street offer designer shopping and upmarket department stores. An Odeon cinema is located on the edge of central Harrogate, as are Asda and Waitrose supermarkets. Marks and Spencer has a large food hall in its store on Oxford Street. A number of bars and restaurants can be found on Cheltenham Crescent and John Street, while the Royal Baths and Parliament Street are at the centre of the town's nightlife. The southern end of central Harrogate consists largely of detached houses that have been converted to offices, although Harrogate Magistrates' Court and Harrogate Central Library can be found on Victoria Avenue. Some upmarket boutiques are situated along the Stray in central southern Harrogate.
- Oatlands is a wealthy area in the south of Harrogate. It includes two schools, Oatlands Junior School and Oatlands Infant School, and some allotments.
- Woodlands is a large area in south-east Harrogate which adjoins Starbeck/Knaresborough Road. It is home to Harrogate Town A.F.C., Willow Tree Primary School, Morrisons and Sainsbury's supermarkets as well as the Woodlands pub.

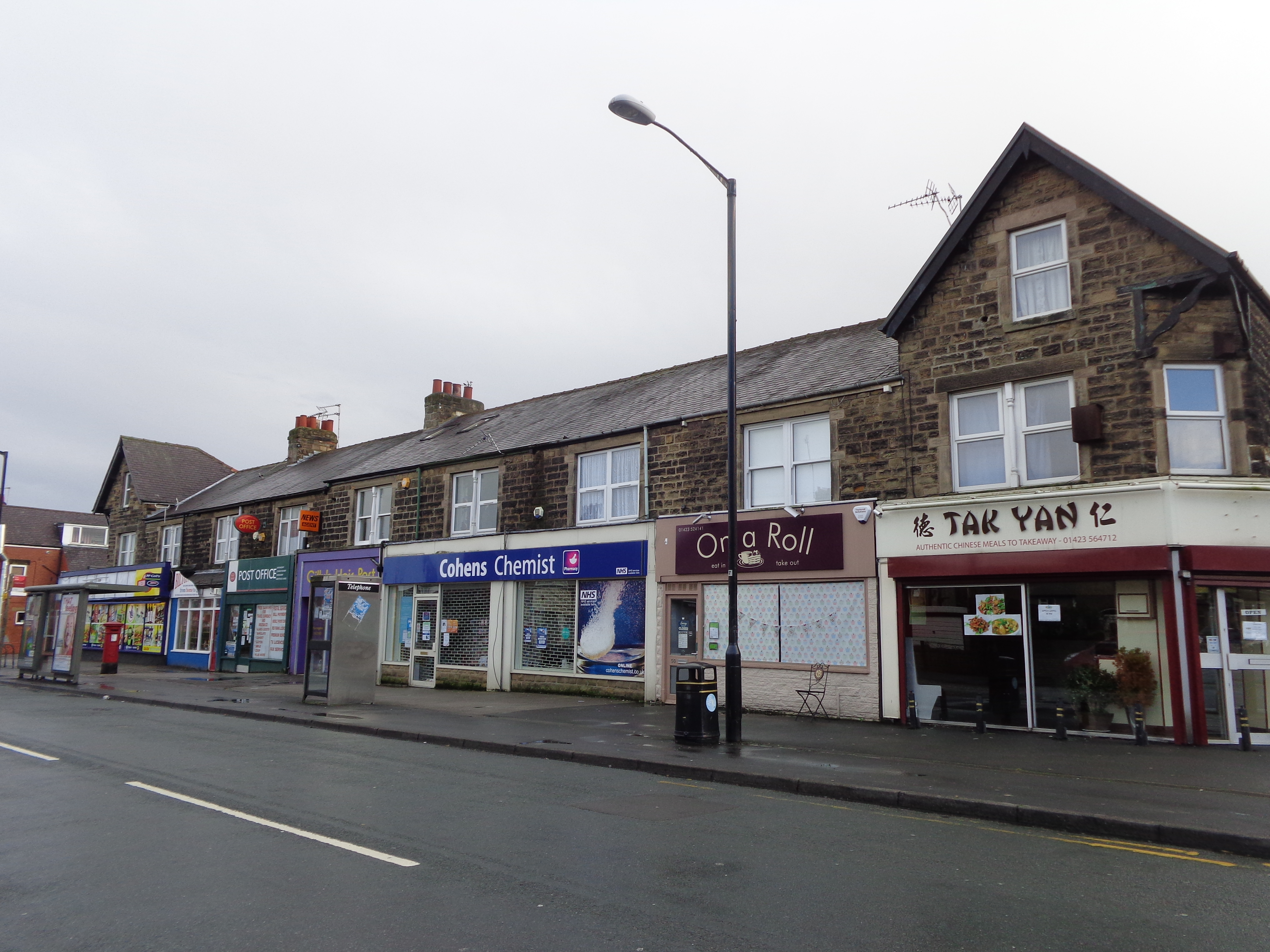
King Edward's Drive, Bilton

- Bilton is a large area of Harrogate with many churches, stores and schools. It has several schools, Richard Taylor School, Woodfield and Bilton Grange. Poets' Corner is known for its 'poetic' street names and expensive housing. On the first May bank holiday each year the Bilton Gala takes place. The first gala was held in 1977 and the event raises money for local groups and organisations.
- Jennyfields is a large, modern area in the north west of Harrogate, it has two schools, Saltergate Infant School and Saltergate Primary School. The town's main public swimming pool is located on the edge of Jennyfield.
- The Duchy estate is an area close to central Harrogate where most houses are large detached homes or large detached homes converted into flats. There are several private schools, notably Duchy College, Harrogate, formerly Harrogate Ladies' College. There is a golf club and open countryside for walking.

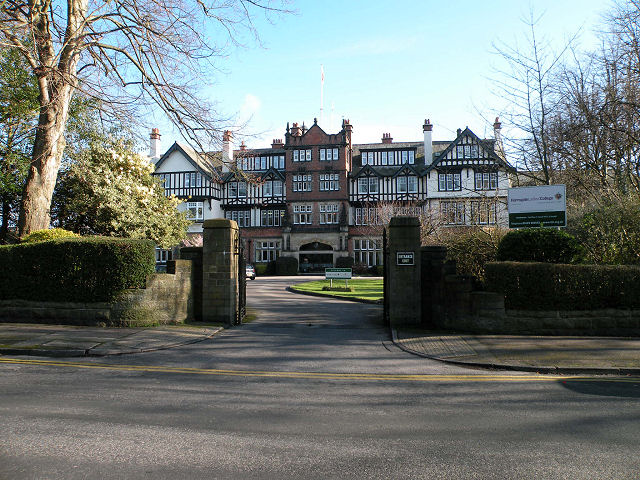
Harrogate Ladies' College

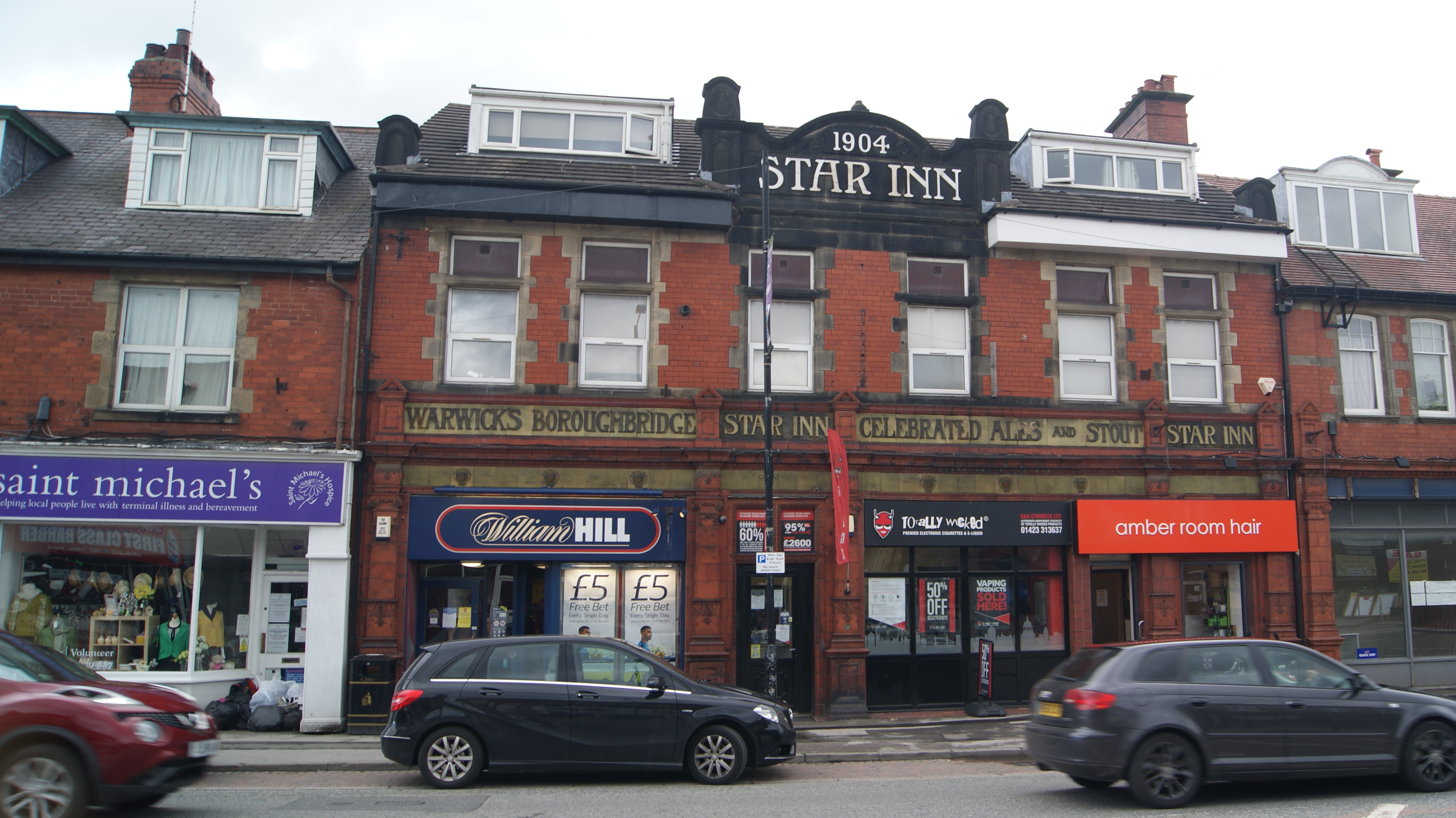
High Street, Starbeck

- Starbeck is a large area to the east of Harrogate with a railway station with trains to elsewhere in Harrogate on to Leeds, Knaresborough and York. A frequent bus service links Starbeck to Harrogate and Knaresborough. A number of schools, churches and shops are situated in Starbeck.
- Pannal is to the south of Harrogate, off the A61 road. It retains much of its village character. Pannal railway station links it to Leeds and to Harrogate, Knaresborough and York.
- High Harrogate is an inner section to the east of the town centre. It is focused on Westmoreland Street and the A59 Skipton Road, where a number of shops and cafés are located. Expensive terraced houses line the Stray, which stops in High Harrogate.
- Low Harrogate is an inner section to the west of the town centre. It is the focus of most tourist activity in the town, with the Royal Pump Room, Mercer Art Gallery and the Valley Gardens.
- Harlow Hill is a district to the west of the town, accessed by Otley Road. It has a number of new developments and an office park. It is known for RHS Harlow Carr Gardens. Harrogate Spring Water bottling plant is on Harlow Hill, as is a water treatment centre.

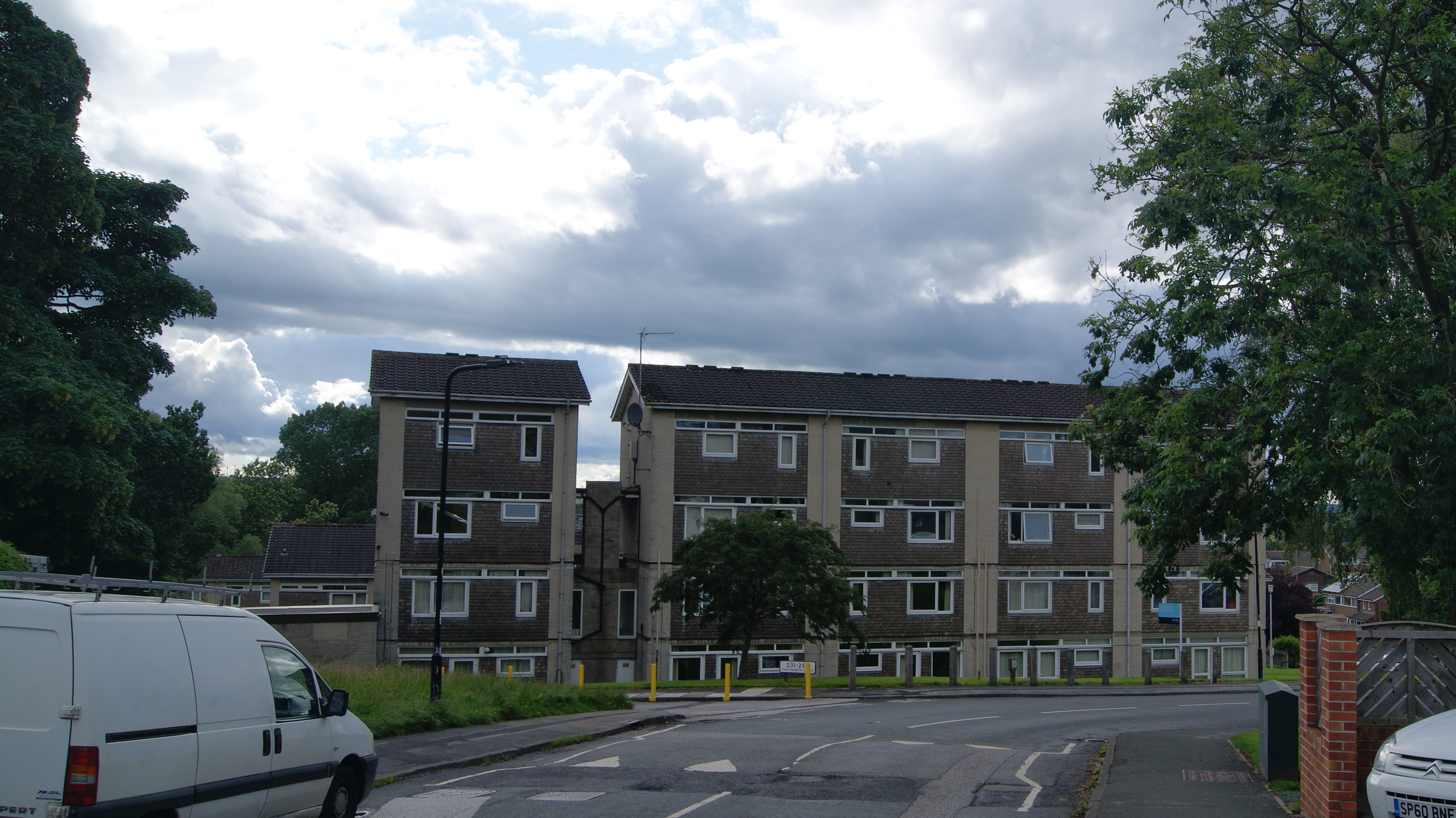
Chatsworth Grove, New Park

- New Park is a small area to the north of Harrogate with a primary school. There are a number of terraced houses and some light industrial and commercial premises.
- Wheatlands is a wealthy district south of the Stray. It is residential and has two high schools, St Aidan's and St John Fisher's.

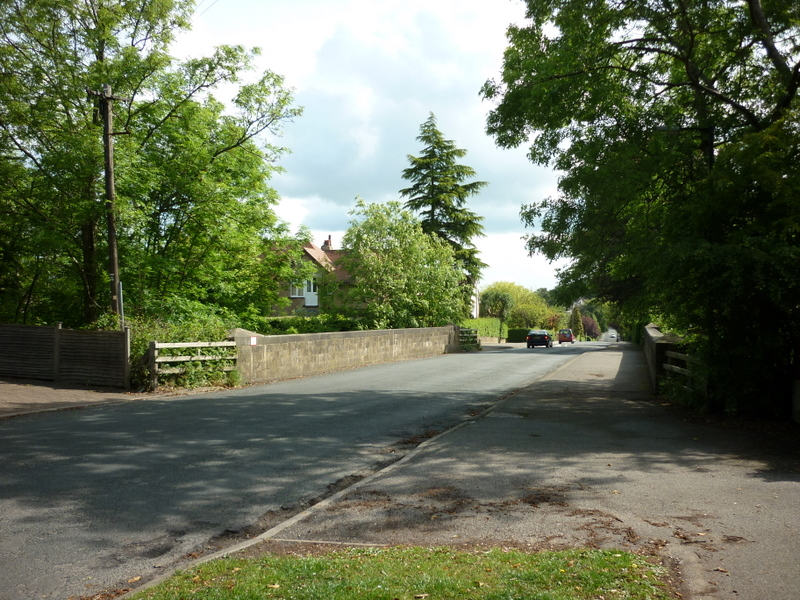
Wheatlands Road, Harrogate

- Knox, north of the town, is separated from Bilton by greenbelt. It straddles Oak Beck, which vehicles used to be able to cross via a ford. This route was blocked in the 1980s and the beck can now be crossed only by pedestrians and cyclists using the adjacent Spruisty packhorse bridge. Cars must go via the A61 (Ripon) road.
- Hornbeam Park is a small, recently developed area accessed only by Hookstone Road. It was developed as an office park and retains many offices, and is also home to Harrogate College (formerly part of Hull College Group, but part of Luminate Education Group, previously known as Leeds City College, since 1 August 2019), a Nuffield fitness and wellbeing centre, Travel Inn and restaurant, hospice and some small warehouses. It is served by Hornbeam Park railway station with trains to Harrogate and Leeds.
- In 2018, 2019, 2020, 2022 and 2023, Fulwith Mill Lane was labelled the most expensive road in Yorkshire. It is located within the Golden Triangle on the south side of Harrogate and the average house price on Fulwith Mill Lane is £1.9 million, with some properties worth in excess of £3 million.

== Economy ==
=== Shopping and dining ===
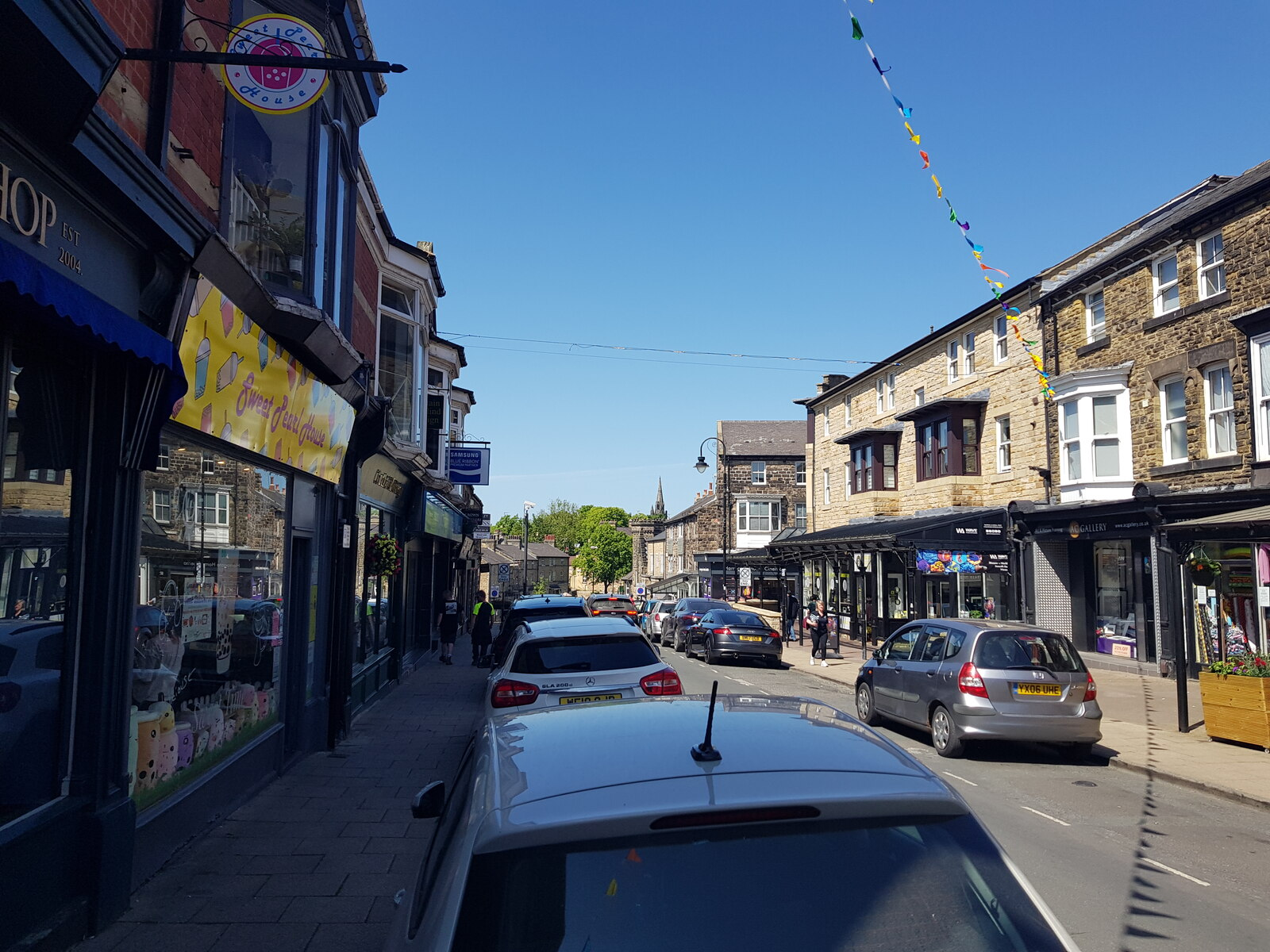
Commercial Street

Harrogate has a strong and varied economy. The town's main shopping district is focused on Cambridge Street, Oxford Street, Beulah Street and James Street where most of the high street shops can be found. There is a wide range of boutique and designer shopping on Parliament Street and in the Montpellier Quarter, as well as independent shopping around Commercial Street.

Eating out is popular in Harrogate, and the town is well served by restaurants. Parliament Street and Cheltenham Parade are lined with many independent and chain restaurants, while there is a concentration of chain restaurants on John Street and Albert Street.

=== Conference and exhibition ===
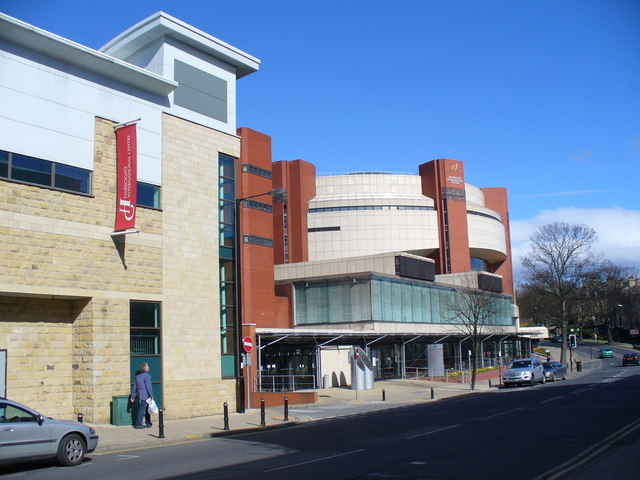
Harrogate International Centre

The conference and exhibition industry is the focus of the town's business, with Harrogate International Centre the third largest fully integrated conference and exhibition centre in the UK, and one of the largest in Europe. Harrogate draws numerous visitors because of its conference facilities. In 2016 such events alone attracted 300,000 visitors to Harrogate. The convention centre was developed in 2020 to be used as a Nightingale Hospital. However, whilst it has been used in an NHS capacity, it has not treated any Coronavirus patients (as of late January 2021) because the conventional hospitals had not run out of capacity.

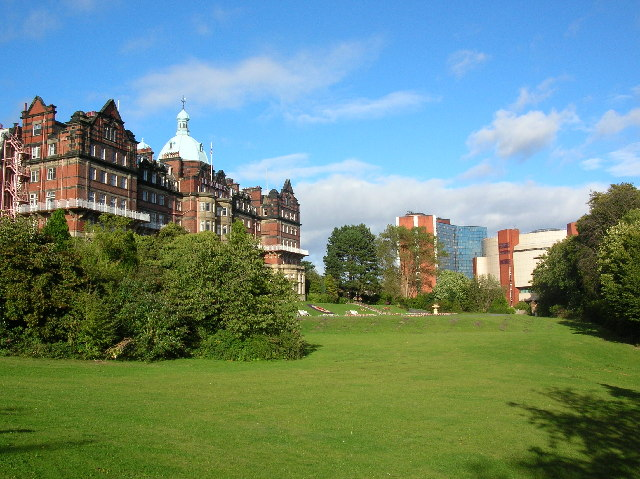
Hotels such as the Majestic now serve Harrogate's conference industry.

It brings in over £150 million to the local economy every year and attracts in excess of 350,000 business visitors annually. The town is home to the Great Yorkshire Showground and Pavilions of Harrogate, which are major conference destinations. The Great Yorkshire Showground is the hub of the regional agricultural industry, hosted by the Yorkshire Agricultural Society. The Great Yorkshire Show, Countryside Live and the twice yearly Harrogate Flower Shows take place there annually. The many business visitors to Harrogate sustain a number of large hotels, some originally built for visitors to the Spa.

=== Companies based in the town ===
Harrogate is the home of Yorkshire Tea, exported by Taylors of Harrogate, as well as internationally exported Harrogate Spring Water. The town also exports Farrah's Toffee and Harrogate Blue cheese.

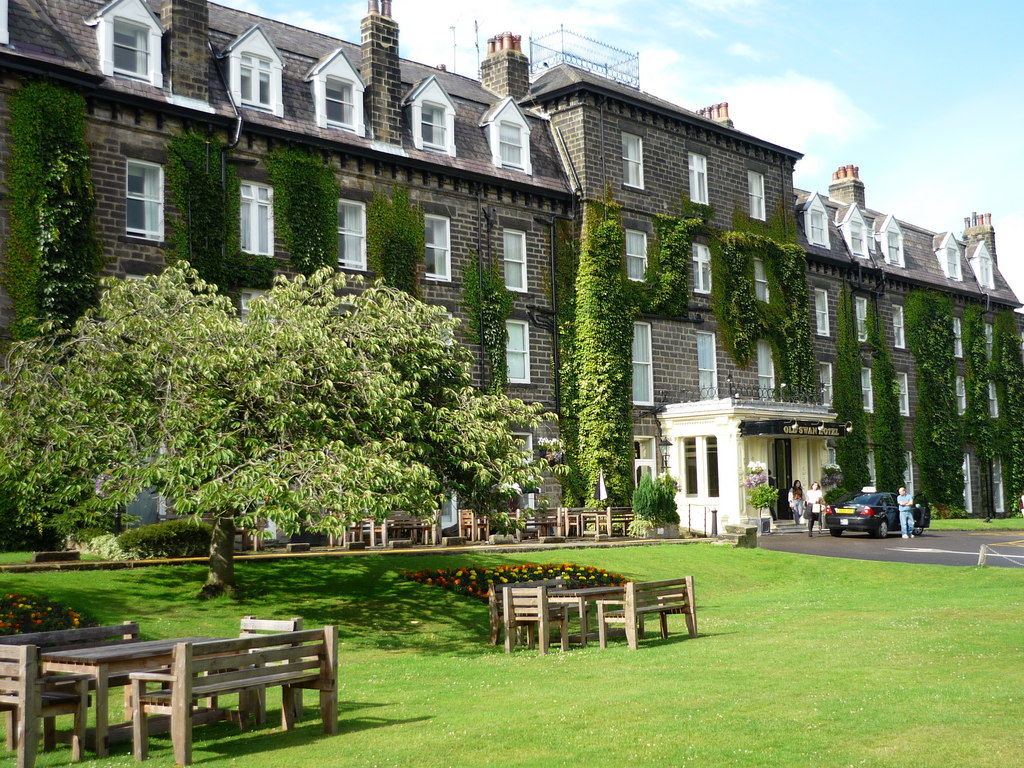
The Old Swan Hotel

=== Military ===
Two military installations are located to the west of Harrogate, the Army Foundation College and RAF Menwith Hill, an electronic monitoring station. There used to be a Royal Air Force supply depot and logistics centre on St George's Road in the south-west of the town, but this closed down in 1994. During the Second World War, RAF Harrogate was used as a training establishment for medical staff and recruit training for the Women's Auxiliary Air Force.

== Landmarks ==
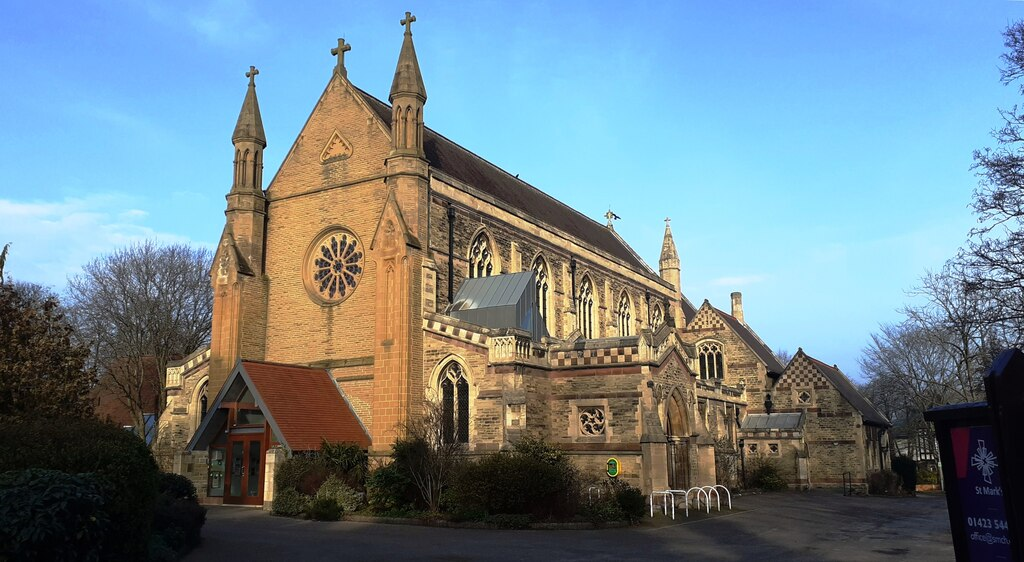
St Mark's Church

There are many fine examples of architecture about the town. The only Grade I listed building in Harrogate is St Wilfrid, Duchy Road, which was designed by the architect Temple Lushington Moore and is often considered to be his masterpiece. In Station Parade stands the Jubilee Memorial, commemorating Queen Victoria's 1887 golden jubilee.

=== Montpellier Quarter ===
An imposing cenotaph is an important landmark in the centre of the town. Bettys are tea rooms established in 1919 owned by Bettys and Taylors of Harrogate – the same company that markets Yorkshire Tea. Bettys has a second tea room at the RHS Harlow Carr Gardens.

The Mercer Art Gallery, now operated by North Yorkshire Council, is home to a collection of some 2,000 works of art, mainly from the 19th and 20th centuries. The collection includes works by William Powell Frith, Atkinson Grimshaw, Sir Edward Burne-Jones, Dame Laura Knight and Alan Davie.

=== Buildings on Crescent Gardens ===
Crescent Gardens is a small open area in central Harrogate surrounded by some of the town's main tourist attractions including the Royal Pump Room, Royal Baths, Royal Hall and the Harrogate Council Offices; Hall M of the Harrogate International Centre fronts onto Crescent Gardens.

The Royal Hall theatre, a Grade II listed building designed by Frank Matcham. As the only surviving Kursaal in Britain, the Royal Hall is an important national heritage building. Restoration work was completed in 2007, and the hall was reopened on 22 January 2008, by the Prince of Wales.

The Royal Pump Room, just off the gardens, houses Europe's strongest sulphur well; it is now a museum showcasing the town's spa history.

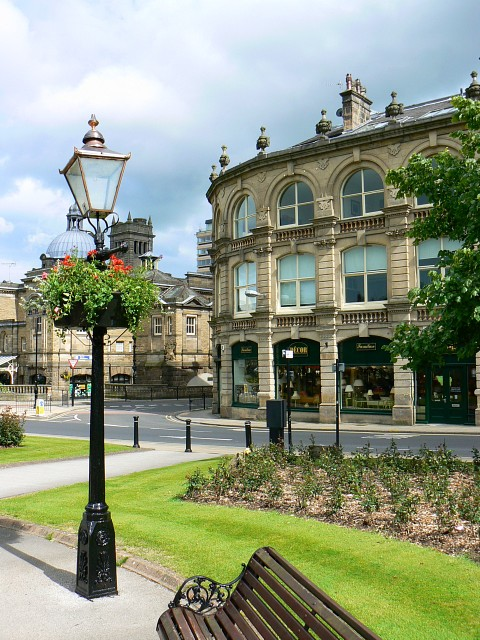
Montpellier Road

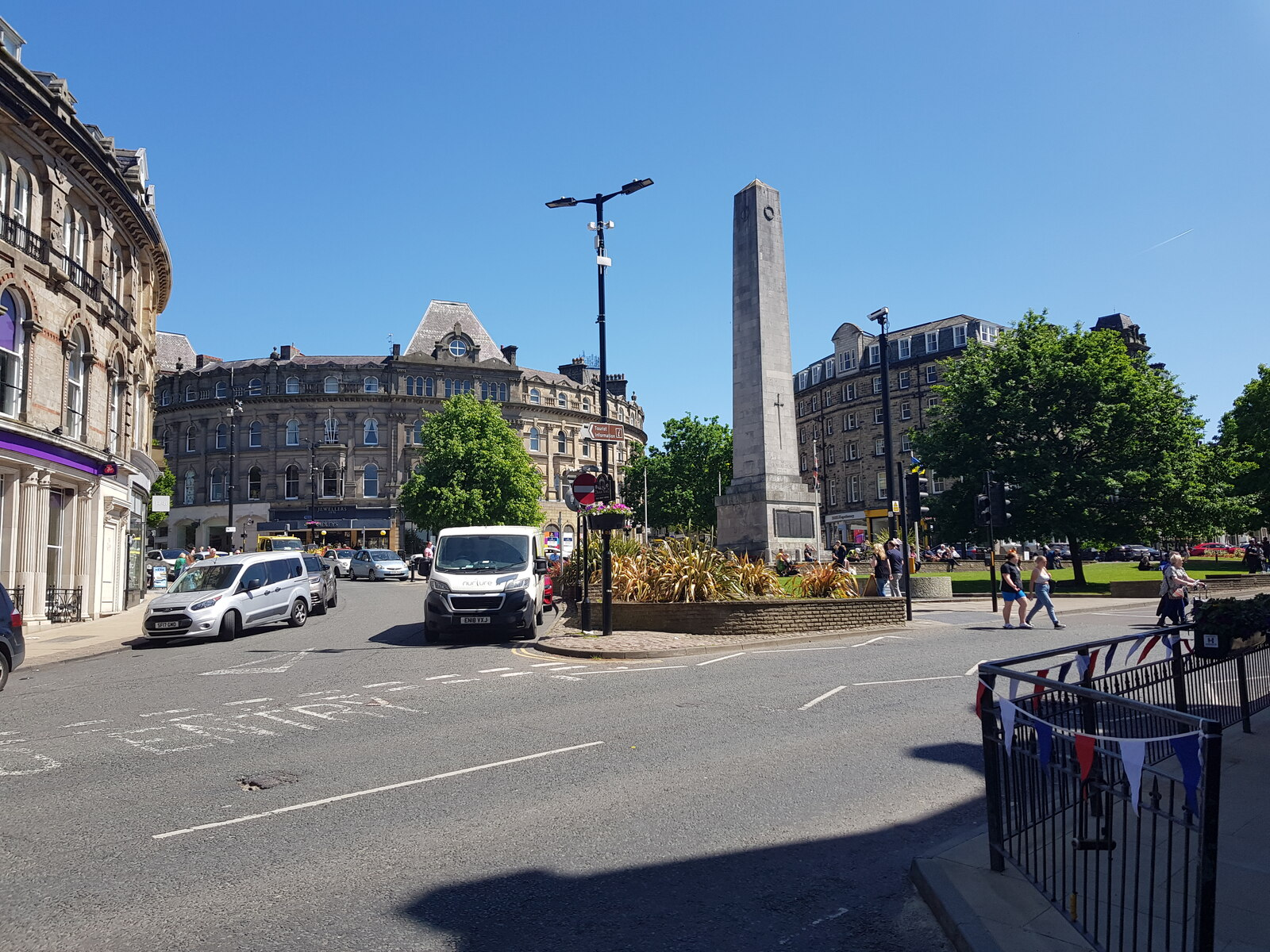
Harrogate war memorial, by Ernest Prestwich

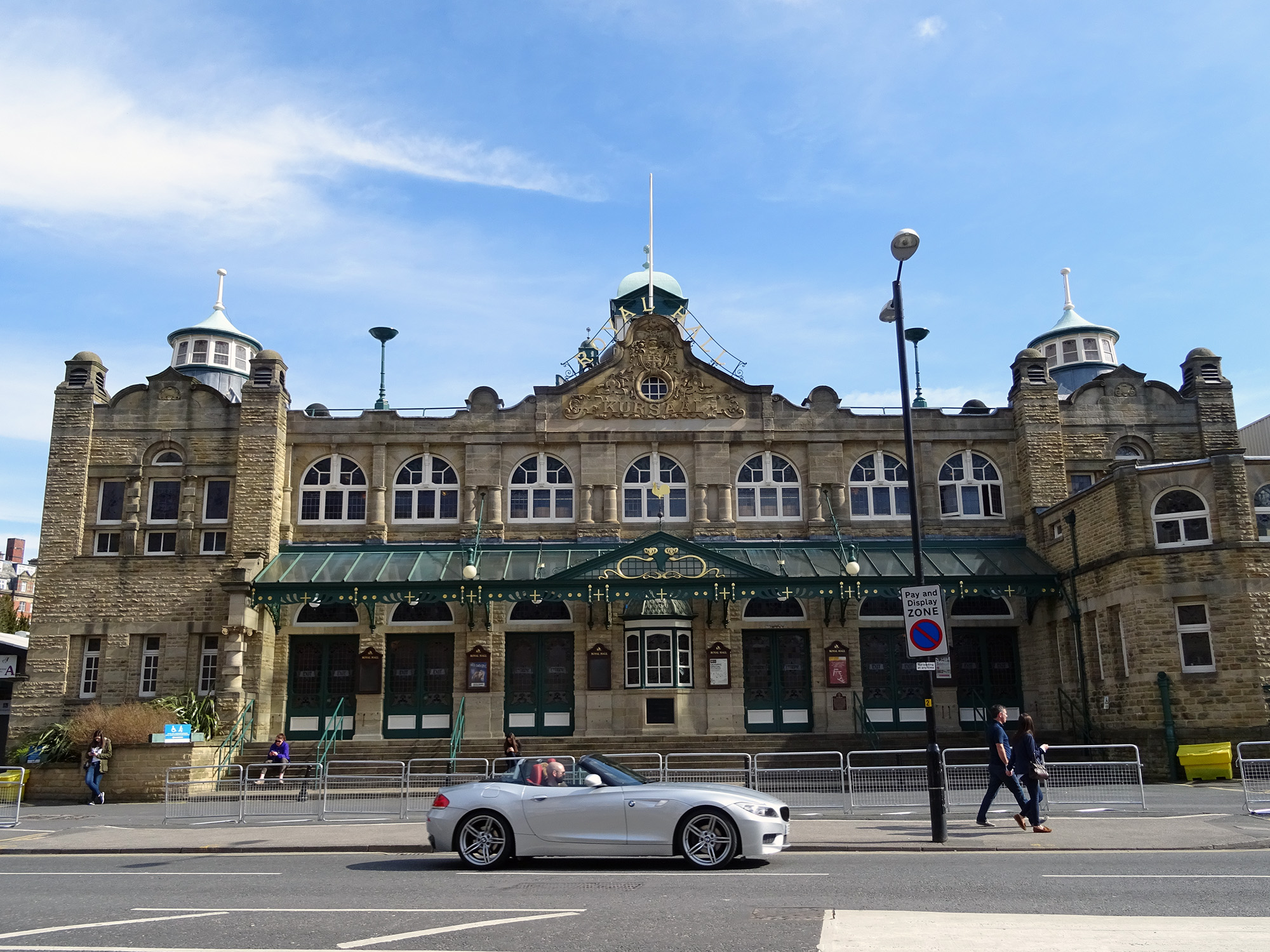
The Kursaal (the Royal Hall)

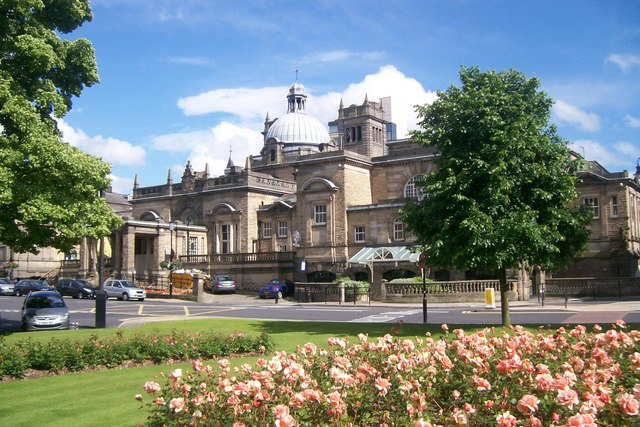
The Royal Baths

=== Parks and gardens ===
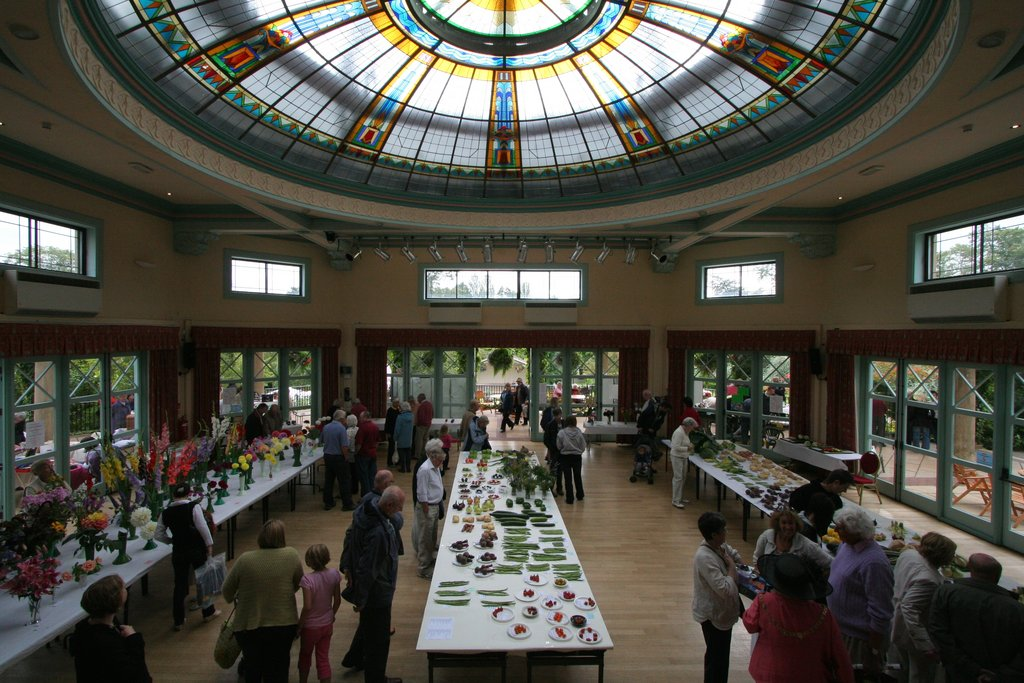
Sun Pavilion, Valley Gardens

Valley Gardens, in Low Harrogate, is the town's main park and covers much of the area originally known as 'Bogs Field', where a number of springs were discovered. Valley Gardens has an ice-cream parlour, children's play area with outdoor paddling pool, a skate park, frisbee golf, crazy golf and mini golf. The Sun Pavilion at the northern edge of the park can be privately hired for weddings. Tennis courts and a bowling green are in the west of the park. The Friends of Valley Gardens group was formed in 2009 to support the park. It works in partnership with Harrogate Borough Council to guide the park's development.

The Stray is an area of open green space that wraps around three sides of the town centre. It was created in 1778 to link most of Harrogate's springs in one protected area by an act of Parliament, which fixed its area as 200 acres (81 ha). The Stray is heavily defended and even now when part is removed, e.g. due to road widening, it must be replaced elsewhere. It has been used for many purposes throughout history, including as an aircraft landing site and farm in wartime, a racecourse during the Victorian period and more recently for cultural and sporting events including the 2014 Tour de France.

RHS Harlow Carr gardens, on the western edge of Harrogate, are award-winning themed gardens and are the Royal Horticultural Society's flagship garden in the North of England.

The town has several smaller parks and gardens, such as Jubilee Gardens and Victoria Gardens on the eastern side of central Harrogate. Other significant green spaces can be found outside the town centre including at The Oval and Coppice Valley.

== Culture ==
On 11 January 1900, Harrogate Grand Opera House, now Harrogate Theatre, opened with a charity gala in aid of British soldiers fighting the Boer War in South Africa; this was followed, on 13 January 1900, by J Tully's pantomime Dick Whittington.

In 1966, the Harrogate Festival of Arts & Science was established, now known as the Harrogate International Festivals, and is recognised as the North of England's leading arts festival; it incorporates a number of festivals within the portfolio including the Theakstons Old Peculier Crime Writing Festival & Theakston's Old Peculier Crime Novel of the Year Award, Raworths Harrogate Literature Festival, Harrogate Music Festival and a number of year-round events.

The town hosted the Eurovision Song Contest 1982 in the Harrogate International Centre.

Harrogate won the 2003 and 2016 Britain in Bloom in the category of 'Large Town' and the European Entente Florale in 2004, reprising its win in the first Entente Florale in 1977. Harrogate was a gold medal winner of Europe in Bloom in 2004. In 2005, a Channel 4 TV show listed Harrogate as the UK's third best place to live; in 2006, it came fourth in the same league, where the programme claimed that it placed lower due to "a slight dip in exam results", although presenter Phil Spencer noted that it was his personal favourite.

Harrogate has two orchestras: Harrogate Symphony Orchestra and Harrogate Philharmonic Orchestra.

The town is also home to an underground music scene that has produced heavy metal and punk rock groups including Workshed, Acid Reign and Blood Youth.

== Sport ==
=== Cycling ===
On 5 July 2014, Harrogate served as the finish line of the first stage of the Tour de France. The event attracted record crowds to the town centre and was televised to a global audience. British cyclist Mark Cavendish was forced to drop out of the race, when he crashed a few metres from the finish line and suffered a dislocated shoulder. The town has since been the focal point for finishing stages of the Tour de Yorkshire in 2017. Each event of the 2019 UCI Road World Championships finished in the town, although the entire historic county of Yorkshire was the official host.

=== Football ===
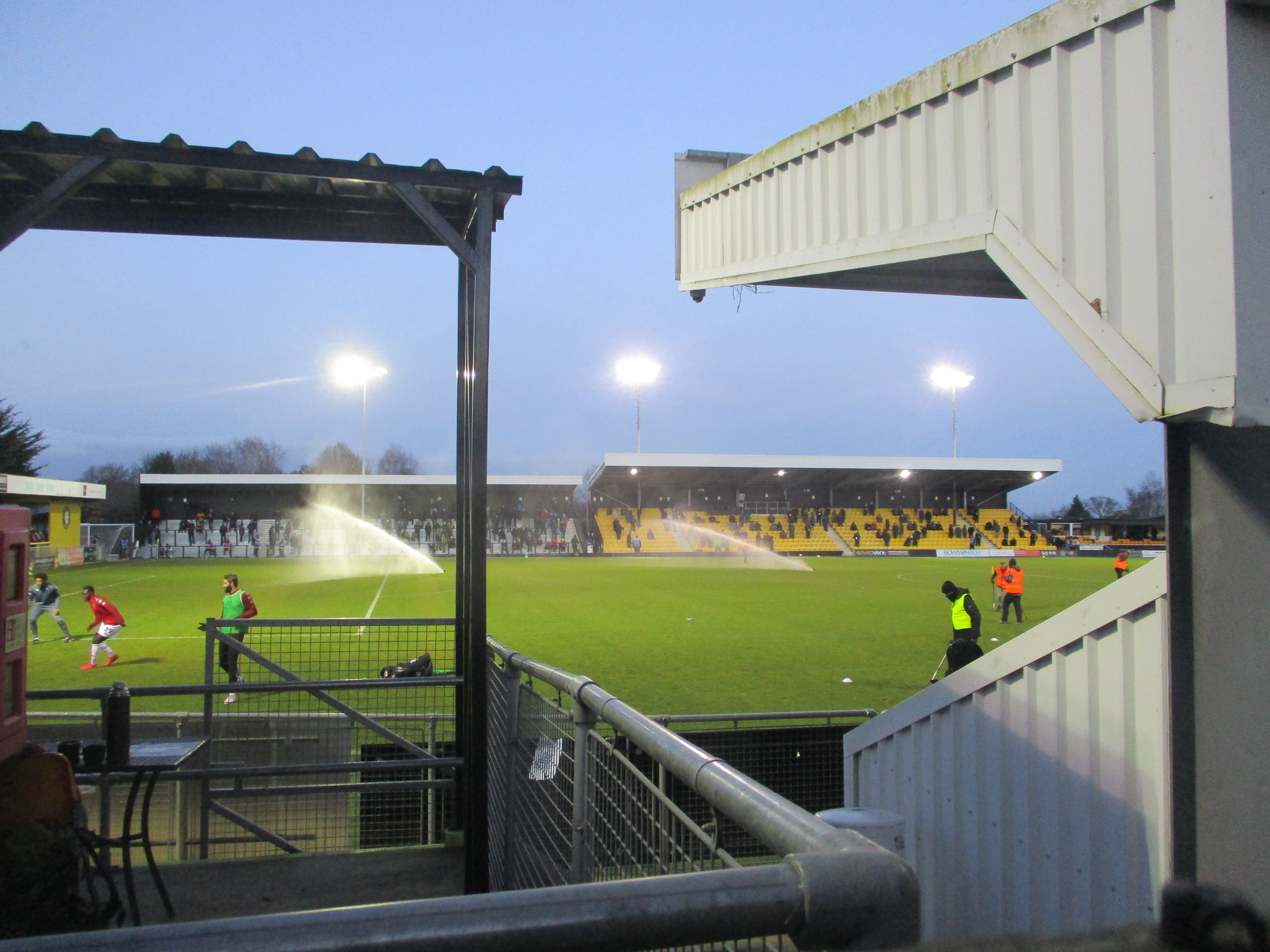
Wetherby Road Stadium

Harrogate Town AFC play at Wetherby Road Stadium. The club competed in League Two, the fourth tier of English football, between 2020 and 2026, having been promoted to the English Football League via the 2019–20 National League Play-offs. They have a historical rivalry with Harrogate Railway Athletic F.C., of the Northern Counties East Football League, located at Station View.

Harrogate RUFC is a North Premier team and formerly based at The County Ground, on Claro Road, but relocated to Rudding Lane on the south side of the town.

=== Cricket ===
Harrogate Cricket Club is to be the home of Yorkshire Women cricket team. Until 1995, the town hosted one Yorkshire county game per year at St George's Road cricket ground. Since 2022, the ground has been sponsored by Kirbys Solicitors. In 2008, a fire destroyed the historic old pavilion at the ground, but it has since been re-built with a modern pavilion, bar, function room and changing rooms.

Harrogate Cricket Club has 4 Saturday teams:

- 1st XI play in the Yorkshire Premier League North; they were the league's inaugural champions in 2016 and is one of the teams eligible to play in the Yorkshire championship whenever the team wins the league. The team formerly played in the Yorkshire ECB County Premier League until 2016.
- 2nd XI play in York Senior League – Division 2
- 3rd XI (also known as Harrogate Strays) play in Nidderdale League Division 1
- 4th XI (also known as Harrogate Devs) play in Nidderdale League Division 5

Bilton Cricket Club, off Bilton Lane, provides opportunities for players of all ages to play in local league cricket; they beat Harrogate Cricket Club at St George's Road in the Black Sheep Trophy of 2006.

=== Field hockey ===
Harrogate Hockey Club is a field hockey club that competes in the Women's England Hockey League, the North Hockey League and the Yorkshire & North East Hockey League.

=== Other ===
According to designer Thomas Heatherwick, the Olympic Cauldron for the 2012 London Olympics was built in a 'Bond Gadget Workshop' in Harrogate.

Harrogate Harriers run from Harrogate Squash & Fitness Centre on Hookstone Drive and Nidd Valley Road Runners share their premises with Harrogate Hockey Club. Harrogate District Swimming Club is at amateur level and has had teams compete at national level. Rock climbing is a sport in and around Harrogate, indoors at the Harrogate Climbing Centre and at Almscliffe Crag and Brimham Rocks.

== Transport ==
=== Railway ===
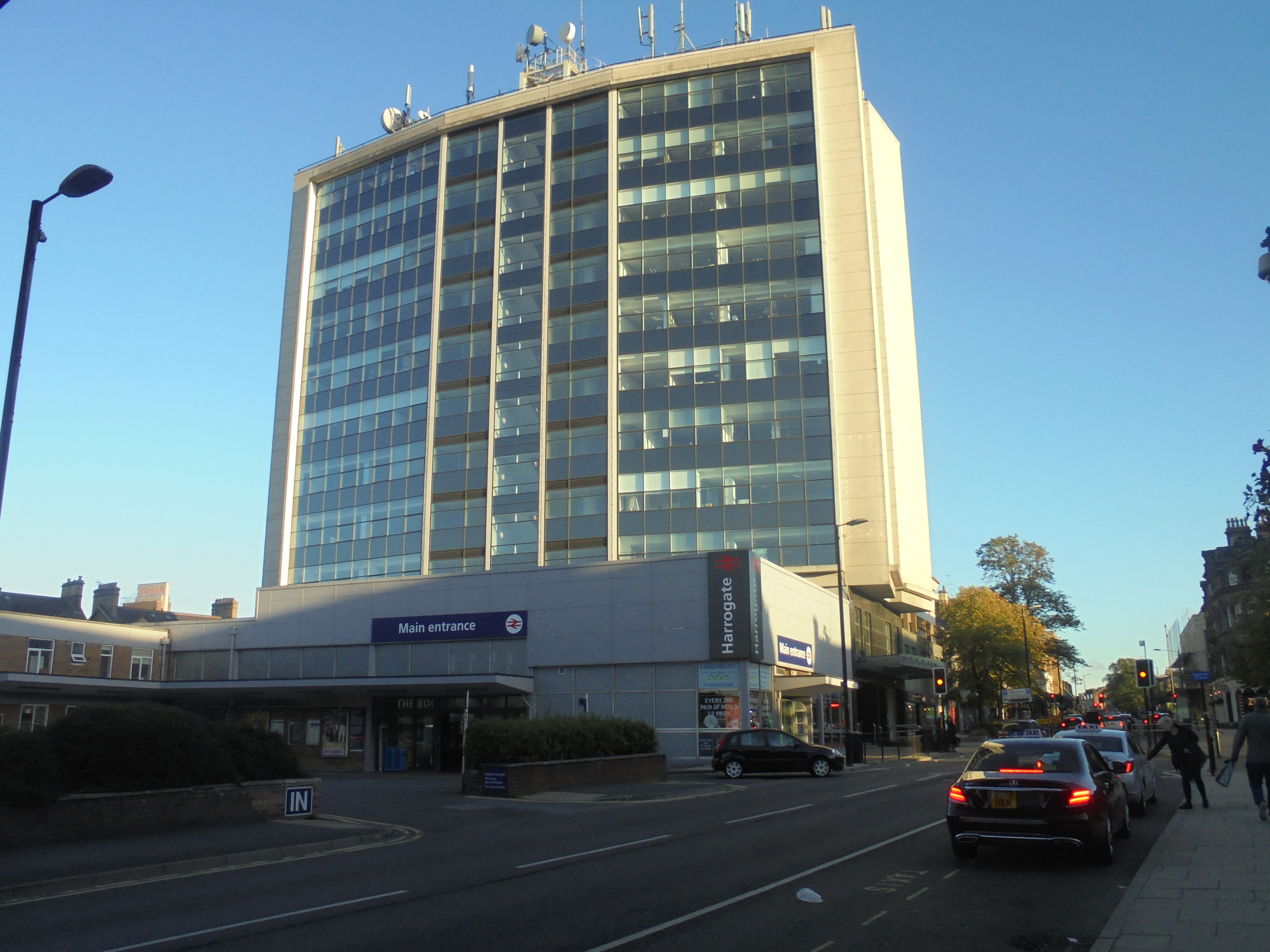
The Exchange, above Harrogate railway station

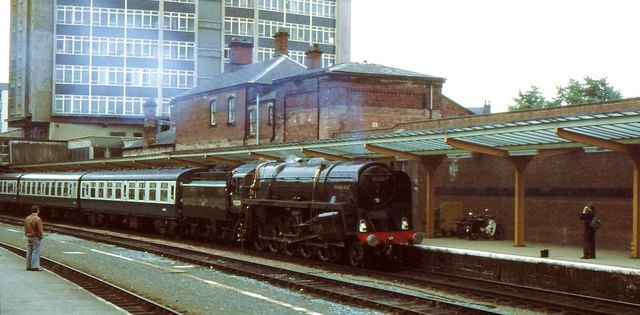
The Evening Star at Harrogate station, 1978

The town is served by four railway stations on the Harrogate Line: Harrogate, Hornbeam Park, Pannal and Starbeck; services on this line run half-hourly to Leeds and York and are operated by Northern Trains. Services to Leeds increase to 4 trains per hour at peak times, complemented by a London North Eastern Railway fast service to Leeds and London King's Cross every two hours.

The former railway lines to Tadcaster and Wetherby were dismantled in the 1960s.

==== Former line to Ripon ====
The Ripon line was closed to passengers on 6 March 1967 and to freight on 5 September 1969 as part of the wider Beeching Axe, despite a vigorous campaign by local campaigners, including the town's MP.

Today, much of the route of the line through the city is now a relief road; however, the former station still stands and it is now surrounded by a new housing development. The issue remains a significant one in local politics and there are movements to restore the line. Reports suggest the reopening of a line between Ripon and Harrogate would be economically viable, costing £40 million and could initially attract 1,200 passengers a day, rising to 2,700. Campaigners renewed their calls on MPs to restore the railway link in 2015.

=== Buses ===
Bus services are operated predominantly by The Harrogate Bus Company and Connexions Buses. Key routes include:

- Route 36: Buses run every 10 minutes between Harrogate, Leeds (via Harewood, Moortown and Chapel Allerton) and every 30 minutes to Ripon
- Route 1: Buses are also every 10 minutes to Knaresborough via Starbeck
- Routes 2, 3, 4, 6: Urban routes to Bilton, Jennyfield, King Edwin Park and Pannal via Harlow Hill respectively
- Route 7: Runs to Leeds via Wetherby, Boston Spa and Seacroft, as well as other parts of semi-rural Leeds
- Other routes connect the town to Bradford via Leeds Bradford Airport, Otley, Pateley Bridge and Boroughbridge

Harrogate bus station is sited in the town centre. It is managed by The Harrogate Bus Company; the 13 stands are also used by other local operators, Flyer and National Express.

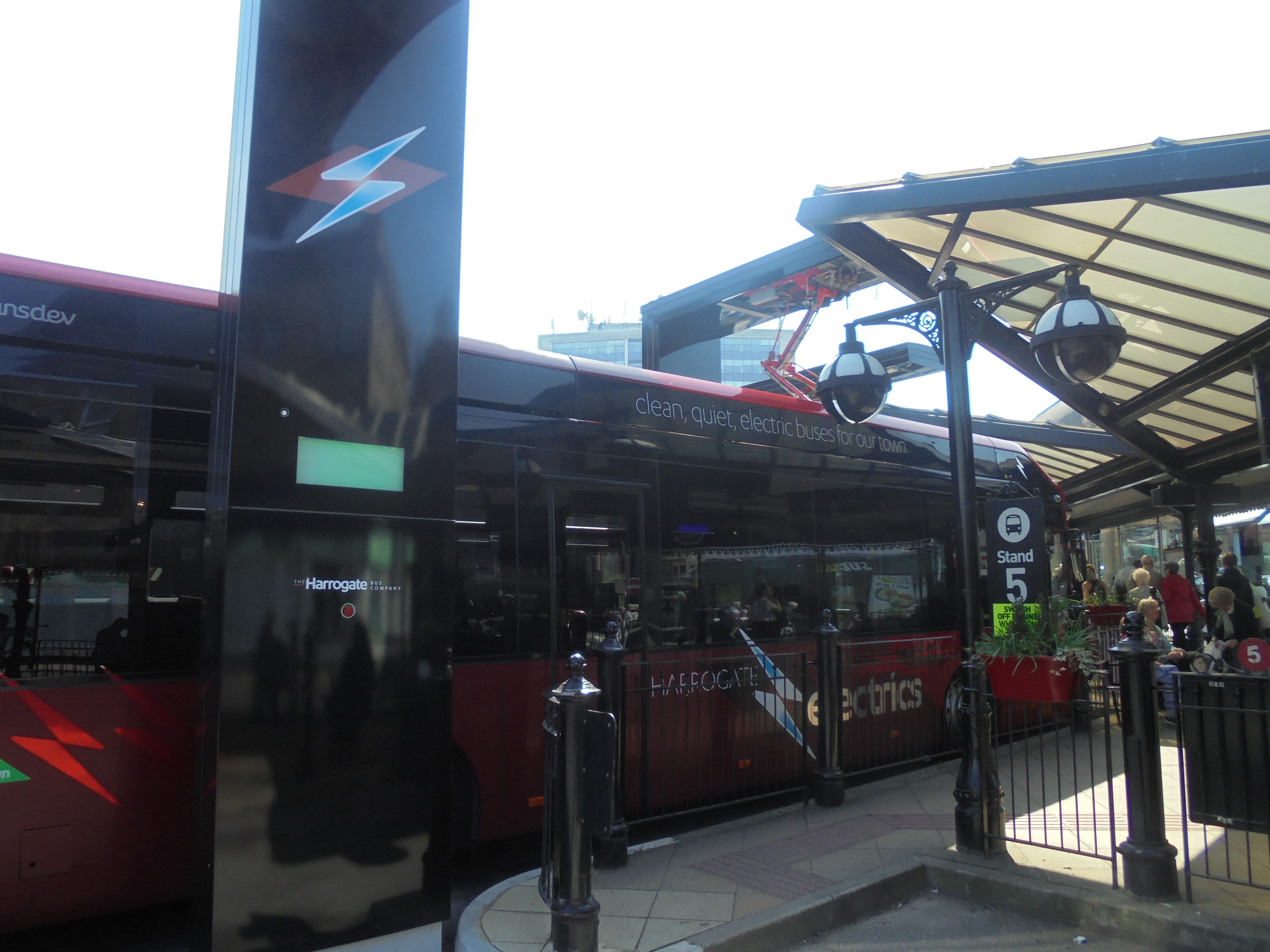
An electric bus charging at Harrogate bus station in April 2019

All Harrogate Bus Company buses are electric, with the first routes converted in 2018. The scheme is part funded by the government's Low Emission Bus Scheme.

=== Roads ===
Road transport to Leeds is via the A61 (north and central Leeds), A658 (north-west Leeds/Leeds Bradford Airport) and A661 (north-east Leeds). The A61 continues northwards to Ripon, while the A658 connects to Bradford after passing through north-west Leeds. The A658 also forms the Harrogate by-pass that skirts the south and east of the town, joining the A59 linking York and the A1(M) to the east and Skipton to the west with Harrogate. The A6040 forms a short connection between the A59 and A61 on the southern edge of the town centre.

=== Airports ===
The nearest airport is Leeds Bradford, 10 miles (16 km) to the south-west, to which there are bus services on Flyer route A2 and train services on the Harrogate Line to Horsforth, one of the closest stations. Teesside and Manchester Airport are accessible by rail via Leeds.

== Education ==
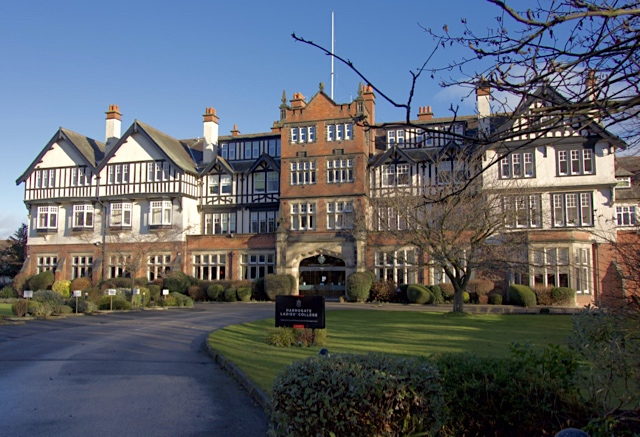
Harrogate Ladies' College

Harrogate has multiple colleges, schools and private schools:

- Ashville College
- Harrogate College, part of the Luminate Education Group
- Harrogate Grammar School, (An academy, part of the Red Kite Learning Trust) Specialist in Language and Technology
- Harrogate High School, a specialist Sports College rebuilt under a governmental scheme in mid-2017
- Harrogate Ladies' College
- Harrogate Tutorial College
- Rossett School a specialist computing and mathematics college
- St. Aidan's C of E High School, a specialist Language and Science School
- St John Fisher Catholic High School, a specialist arts and humanities school
- Army Foundation College

== Media ==
- The town's main printed news source is the Harrogate Advertiser, formerly part of Ackrill Media Group, now part of National World. The newspaper was first printed in 1836.
- The Stray Ferret is the main online news service for the Harrogate district.
- The Harrogate Informer publishes news online throughout the district.
- The local radio stations are BBC Radio York on 104.3 & 103.7 FM and Greatest Hits Radio Harrogate & The Yorkshire Dales on 97.2 FM.
- Local news and television programmes are provided by BBC Yorkshire and BBC North East & Cumbria on BBC One and ITV Yorkshire & ITV Tyne Tees on ITV.

== Notable statistics ==
In 2012, Harrogate had the highest concentration of drink-drivers in the UK. A March 2013 survey from the British property website Rightmove ranked Harrogate as the "happiest place" to live in the United Kingdom; the same result was seen in 2014 and 2015. In 2014, Harrogate District Hospital had the best cancer care of any hospital in England.

== Notable people ==
- Olly Alexander (born 1990), singer and musician
- Kathleen Frances Barker (1901–1963), children's book illustrator and writer. Daughter of Wright Barker.
- Wright Barker (1863–1941), painter, specialising in animal portraits, landscapes, and portraits of people. Father of Kathleen Frances Barker.
- Donald Simpson Bell, (1890–1916), First World War Victoria Cross recipient
- Sir Dhunjibhoy Bomanji (1862–1937), shipping magnate, philanthropist.
- Paul Bottomley (born 1965), footballer
- Dewey Bunnell (born 1952), singer and songwriter with the band America
- Jim Carter (born 1948) actor
- Edward Chapman (1901–1977), actor
- Ben Coad, (1994), English cricketer
- Rachel Daly (1991), English Footballer
- Oliver Dingley (born 1992), Olympic diver
- Ian Douglas-Wilson (1912–2013), physician and editor of The Lancet
- Jenny Duncalf (born 1982), squash player
- Wilfrid Edgecombe (1871–1963), spa physician who was instrumental in the founding of Harrogate District Hospital.
- Richard Ellis (1820–1895), one of the first mayors of Harrogate.
- Bernard Walter Evans (1843–1922), landscape painter and watercolourist. Harrogate resident 1890s to 1911.
- John Farrah (1849–1907) grocer, confectioner, biologist, born in Harrogate.
- Gerald Finzi (1901–1956), composer
- Courtenay Foote (1879–1925), silent-film actor
- Samson Fox (1838–1903), engineer, industrialist, and philanthropist
- Leah Galton (born 1994), football player for Manchester United
- Luke Garbutt (born 1993), footballer for Blackpool, attended Harrogate Grammar School.
- Thom Sonny Green (born 1985), drummer for indie rock band Alt-J.
- H. L. A. Hart (1907–1992), legal philosopher
- Thomas Holroyd (1821–1904), portrait and landscape painter, co-owner of photographic studio T & J. Holroyd.
- Charles Hull (1890–1953), soldier who received the Victoria Cross.
- Garry Jennings, musician born in Harrogate.
- Mik Kaminski (born 1951), violinist and band member of ELO and Violinski
- Jack Laugher (born 1995), Olympic diver.
- Christina Le Moignan (born 1942), minister and academic, who served as President of the British Methodist Conference
- Peter McCormick (born 1952), solicitor, Chairman of the Premier League, Vice Chairman of The Football Association
- Fridel Meyer (1904–1982), Long-distance kayaker and businesswoman. German-born; later a Harrogate resident.
- Sarah Moore (born 1993), a racing driver who competes in the W Series
- Malcolm Neesam (1946-2022), historian, writer and archivist, specialising in the history of Harrogate
- David Nobbs (1935–2015) author and screenwriter, creator of Reginald Perrin
- Andy O'Brien (born 1979), footballer for the Vancouver Whitecaps.
- Jack Ogden, jewellery historian, grew up in Harrogate.
- Gord Pettinger (born 11 November 1911 in Harrogate, England – d. 12 April 1986) was a British professional ice hockey centre
- William Pope (1825–1905), clergyman and follower of the Oxford Movement, who seceded from Anglicanism to the Catholic Church and became rector of St Robert's Church, Harrogate.
- Richard Ridgeway (1848–1924), Victoria Cross recipient, lived his later life and died in Harrogate
- Ilona Rodgers (born 1942), actress
- Kathleen Rutherford (1896–1975). Physician, philanthropist, humanitarian aid worker, peace campaigner.
- Arnold Shaw (1896–1972), British Army officer and cricketer
- David Simpson (1860–1931), former freeman and four times mayor of Harrogate, and contractor who built the Grand Hotel in the town.
- John Smith (1797–1866), philanthropist, partner in Beckett's Bank, and founder of the Harrogate mansion "Belvedere", where he lived in retirement.
- Hugo Speer (born 1968), actor
- Harold Styan OBE (1895–1982), gymnast, sports teacher and youth worker.
- Jonny Tattersall (born 1994), cricketer
- Laura Veale (1867–1963), first qualified female doctor practising in Harrogate and the North Riding of Yorkshire.
- William John Seward Webber (1842–1919), sculptor
- Mark Wharton, musician born in Harrogate
- Shirley Wray, neuro-ophthalmologist and Professor at Harvard Medical School

== See also ==
- Listed buildings in Harrogate
- Association of Harrogate Apprentices
- Churches in Harrogate
- Harrogate power station
- Harrogate (Stonefall) Commonwealth War Graves Commission Cemetery
- Harrogate District Hospital
- List of public art in Harrogate
- List of spa towns in the United Kingdom
