= Paul Bottomley =

English footballer

Personal information
- Date of birth: 11 September 1965 (age 61)
- Place of birth: Harrogate, England
- Position: Central defender

Senior career*
Years	Team	Apps	(Gls)
1989–1992	Guiseley	77	(3)
1992–1993	Bridlington Town	?	(?)
1993	→ Doncaster Rovers (loan)	10	(1)
1993–1998	Guiseley	152	(7)
1998	Whitby Town	9	(1)
1998–1999	Harrogate Town	?	(?)
1999	Accrington Stanley	?	(?)
- * Club domestic league appearances and goals

Paul Bottomley (born 11 September 1965 in Harrogate) is an English former professional footballer who played on loan for Doncaster Rovers in the Football League as a defender. The club wanted to sign Bottomley on a permanent deal; however he opted to remain part-time when his loan spell expired.

== Career statistics ==
Club	Season	League			FA Cup		League Cup		Other		Total	
Club	Season	Division	Apps	Goals	Apps	Goals	Apps	Goals	Apps	Goals	Apps	Goals
Doncaster Rovers (loan)	1993–94	Division Three	10	1	—		2	0	1 (Note: Appearance(s) in Football League Trophy)	0	13	1
Guiseley	1993–94	Northern Premier League Division One	20	2	—		—		19 (Note: Eight appearances two goals in FA Trophy; one appearance in Northern Premier League Challenge Cup; four appearances one goal in Northern Premier League President's Cup; two appearances in Northern Premier League First Division Cup; four appearances in West Riding County Cup)	3	39	5
Guiseley	1994–95	Northern Premier League Premier Division	28	1	5	2	—		9 (Note: Three appearances in FA Trophy; one appearance in Northern Premier League Challenge Cup; one appearance in Northern Premier League President's Cup; four appearances in West Riding County Cup)	0	42	3
Guiseley	1995–96	Northern Premier League Premier Division	37	1	3	1	—		16 (Note: Four appearances in FA Trophy; one appearance in Northern Premier League Challenge Cup; six appearances in Northern Premier League President's Cup; five appearances in West Riding County Cup)	0	56	2
Guiseley	1996–97	Northern Premier League Premier Division	34	1	1	0	—		10 (Note: Four appearances in FA Trophy; four appearances in Northern Premier League Challenge Cup; two appearances one goal in West Riding County Cup)	1	45	2
Guiseley	1997–98	Northern Premier League Premier Division	33	2	3	0	—		8 (Note: One appearance in Northern Premier League Challenge Cup; four appearances in Northern Premier League President's Cup; three appearances in West Riding County Cup)	0	44	2
Guiseley	Total		152	7	12	3	—		62	4	226	14
Whitby Town	1998–99	Northern Premier League Premier Division	9	1	1	0	—		1 (Note: Appearance(s) in Northern Premier League Challenge Cup)	1	11	2
Career total			171	9	13	3	2	0	64	5	250	17
