= Harrogate Council Offices =

Municipal building in Harrogate, North Yorkshire, England

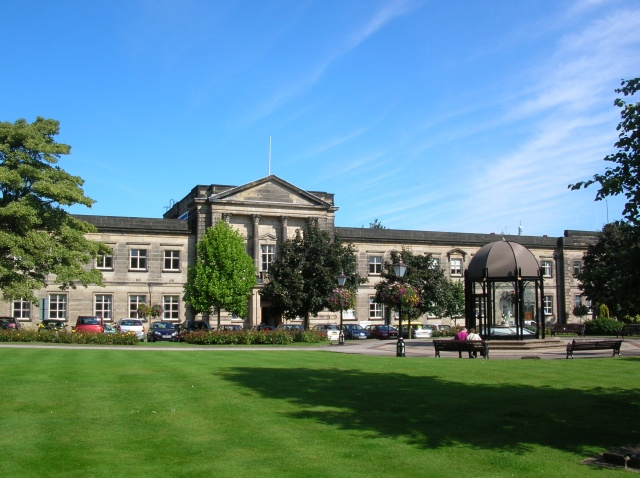
- Harrogate Council Offices

- Location within North Yorkshire
- 53.9949°N 1.5461°W
- Location: Harrogate

History
- Built: 1931

Site notes
- Architect: Leonard Clarke
- Architectural style: Neoclassical style

The Harrogate Council Offices is a municipal building in Crescent Gardens in Harrogate, North Yorkshire, England.

== History ==
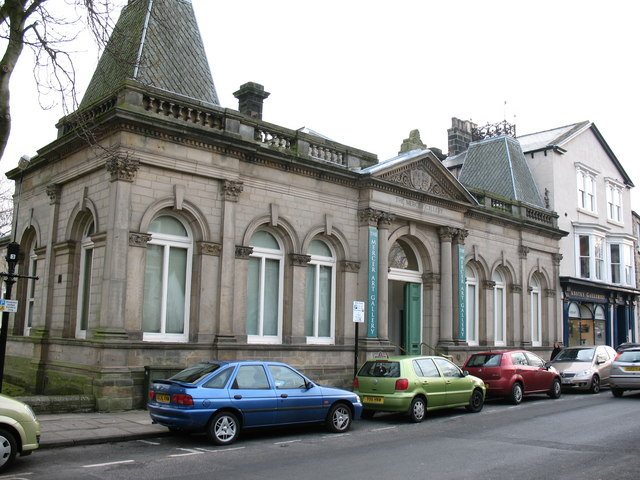
The old Town Hall in Swan Road

The council offices were commissioned to replace the old town hall in Swan Road which had been built in 1805. (Note: The building in Swan Road had originally been designed as assembly rooms and opened in 1805; the building was rebuilt to a design by J. Hiscox in the Neoclassical style and re-opened as a theatre in 1875. It hosted various well-known performers such as the actresses, Sarah Bernhardt and Lillie Langtry, as well as the playwright, Oscar Wilde. Following the incorporation of Harrogate as a borough in 1884, the building became the local town hall in 1900. Once the council offices had been completed in 1931, the old town hall became the rates and housing benefits office and, in 1985, it was converted to serve as the new Mercer Art Gallery, named after the watercolour painter, Sidney Agnew Mercer.) After finding that the old town hall was too cramped, civic leaders at Harrogate Borough Council decided to procure new council offices: the site they selected had been occupied by the old Victoria Baths which had been dismantled by the engineer, Samson Fox, and moved to his home, Grove House.

The new building was designed by Leonard Clarke, built at a cost of £40,000 and opened by Philip Cunliffe-Lister MP, the President of the Board of Trade, on 31 October 1931. The design involved a symmetrical main frontage with 28 bays facing onto the Crescent Gardens with the end bays slightly projected forwards; the central section of three bays, which also slightly projected forward, featured a doorway with a stone surround on the ground floor and the borough coat of arms above; there were three windows of the first floor flanked by Corinthian order columns with an entablature inscribed with the borough motto "Arx Celebris Fontibus" (English: "A citadel famous for its springs'") and a pediment above. Internally, the principal rooms were the council chamber, the mayor's parlour and the committee rooms.

Princess Elizabeth, accompanied by the Duke of Edinburgh, entered at the council offices and signed the visitor's book during a tour of the West Riding of Yorkshire in July 1949. In the 1980s a bunker was constructed under the building to protect civic leaders in the event of a nuclear attack.

After the council decided to procure a new civic centre in February 2015, a new building, which was designed by Farrell and Clark and built by Harry Fairclough (Construction) Limited at a cost of £11.5 million, was opened at Knapping Mount in November 2017. The council offices at Crescent Gardens were marketed by estate agents in January 2015, but discussions with the initial preferred bidder broke down after the bidder failed to submit a planning application on a timely basis. The building was then re-marketed and sold to another developer, Impala Estates, in January 2020. Impala Estates revealed proposals to convert the building into offices, together with a gym and a roof garden restaurant, in October 2020.
