= List of public art in Harrogate =

This is a list of public art in Harrogate, in North Yorkshire, England. This list applies only to works of public art accessible in an outdoor public space. For example, this does not include artwork visible inside a museum.

Image	Title / individual commemorated	Location	Date	Artist	Material	Coordinates
	Queen Victoria	Station Square	1887	William Webber (sculptor), H.E. and A. Brown (architects)	Marble	53.992314°N 1.538121°W
	Cupid and Psyche	Crescent Gardens	1861	Giovanni Maria Benzoni	Stone	53.99468°N 1.545569°W
	Giant's Spade	Harlow Carr	2005	Steve Blaylock	Steel	53.983379°N 1.576648°W
		Valley Gardens			Bronze	53.99048°N 1.55202°W
