= Arnold Shaw (cricketer) =

English cricketer and soldier (1896–1972)

Personal information
- Full name: Arnold Lupton Shaw
- Born: 19 January 1896; Harrogate, Yorkshire, England
- Died: 13 November 1972 (aged 76); Malton, Yorkshire, England
- Batting: Unknown
- Bowling: Unknown

Domestic team information
- Years: Team
- 1933/34–1935/36: Europeans
- 1934/35–1935/36: Madras

Career statistics
Competition	First-class
Matches	4
Runs scored	64
Batting average	9.14
100s/50s	–/–
Top score	35
Balls bowled	126
Wickets	5
Bowling average	12.00
5 wickets in innings	–
10 wickets in match	–
Best bowling	4/47
Catches/stumpings	3/–
- Source: ESPNcricinfo, 9 December 2022

Arnold Lupton Shaw DSO (19 January 1896 – 13 November 1972) was an English first-class cricketer and British Army officer.

Shaw was born at Harrogate in January 1896. He joined the British Army at the start of the First World War, serving as a non-commissioned officer in the 5th Royal Irish Lancers, where he saw action on the Western Front. He was present at the Battles of Aisne, Ypres, Somme, and Arras. Shaw transferred to the Yorkshire Regiment in September 1917, when he received a commission as a second lieutenant.

Following the war, he was promoted to lieutenant in March 1919, and served in British India in the Waziristan campaign. Shaw transferred to the Green Howards during the 1920s and was promoted to captain in November 1929. From 1930 to 1931, he served in the Shanghai Defence Force. By 1933, he was serving with the Green Howards and was seconded to the Auxiliary Force in India in January of that year. In India, he played first-class cricket on four occasions between 1934 and 1936, making two appearances for the Europeans cricket team in the Madras Presidency Matches and two appearances for Madras in the Ranji Trophy. He scored 64 runs in his four matches, with a highest score of 35. With the ball, he took 5 wickets at an average of 12.00, with best figures of 4 for 47.

Shaw left India in January 1936 and was restored to the Green Howards, with promotion to major following in August 1938. Shaw served in the Second World War, where he commanded the 1st Battalion, Green Howards. He was mentioned in dispatches in recognition of gallant and distinguished service during the Anglo-Iraqi War and the Anglo-Soviet invasion of Iran. In September 1943, he was promoted to lieutenant colonel, In November of the same year, he received the Distinguished Service Order. In the latter stages of the war, he was appointed to Military Commander of Lydda and Gaza Districts.

Shaw retired from the Green Howards following the war and upon exceeding the age for recall in December 1948, was granted the honorary rank of brigadier. He emigrated to Kenya Colony with his wife, Constance Smith (m. 1917), in January 1949 aboard the liner SS Matiana. There, he joined the Colonial Police in Nairobi, with the rank of assistant superintendent. He became a senior superintendent in 1956, policing there during the Mau Mau rebellion. He spent his final years in England, where he died in November 1972 at Malton, Yorkshire.
