= Listed buildings in Harrogate =

There are 190 listed buildings in the town of Harrogate that are recorded in the National Heritage List for England. These are included in the following lists, divided by ward of the former Borough of Harrogate (in effect between 2002 and 2018, see List of electoral wards in Harrogate):

- Listed buildings in Harrogate (Bilton Ward)
- Listed buildings in Harrogate (Granby Ward)
- Listed buildings in Harrogate (Harlow Moor Ward)
- Listed buildings in Harrogate (High Harrogate Ward)
- Listed buildings in Harrogate (Hookstone Ward)
- Listed buildings in Harrogate (Killinghall Ward)
- Listed buildings in Harrogate (Low Harrogate Ward)
- Listed buildings in Harrogate (Rossett Ward)
- Listed buildings in Harrogate (Starbeck Ward)
- Listed buildings in Harrogate (Stray Ward)
- Listed buildings in Harrogate (Woodfield Ward)
