= Churches in Harrogate =

Group of places of worship in Harrogate

The Churches in Harrogate, North Yorkshire, England, number around 30 (new ones start and some come and go). Almost every one is listed on the Churches Together website.

The theology, musical styles and churchmanship of the churches ranges from high and low Anglican with a smattering of liberal churches, with charismatic and evangelicals represented in various forms. The history of Christianity in Harrogate dates back to the 15th century with early chapels in the area which is now called The Stray (or 200 acres). St John's chantry chapel was founded in 1439, later becoming Christ Church. Its church bell is now in the tower of West Park United Reformed Church (previously the Victoria Avenue Congregational church).

== Anglican ==
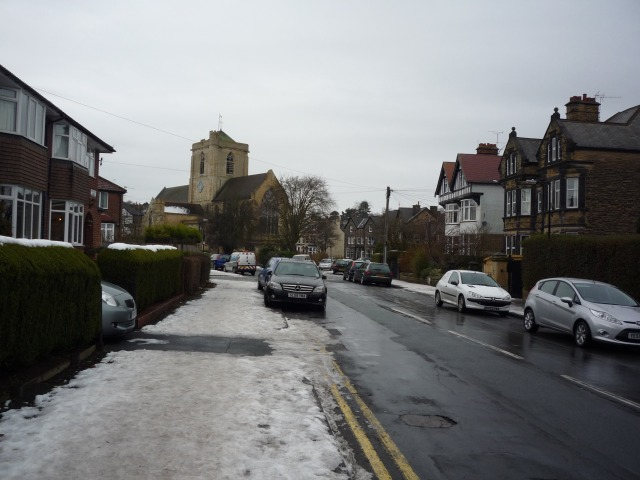
St Mary's Church

Although in the 1851 religious census, non-conformist denominations - particularly Methodism - were dominant in the town of Harrogate and in the wider borough, today the largest denomination is the Church of England (Anglican), represented by a wide range of churches.

Christ Church on the Stray was the first church building in Harrogate, originating as a church plant from St John's. Knaresborough, and then developing into a separate parish. Christ Church in turn planted St Peter's in the town centre, St John's, Bilton and St Andrew's, Starbeck - all of which today (like Christ Church itself) are thriving parish churches.

Over time as Harrogate grew further churches were planted, including St. Wilfrid's and St Mark's. In recent years both All Saints, Harlow Hill and St Mary's have closed and new fresh expression of church known as the Kairos Church has developed as a network church across the town.

The wider Anglican network (Deanery) also includes Birstwith and Wetherby, with churches in the villages of Hampsthwaite, Killinghall, Beckwithshaw, Kirby Overblow, Spofforth, Kirk Deighton and Little Ribston.

The Anglican churches in Harrogate today represent the largest denomination in the town, but are deeply committed to working with the widest range of churches regardless of denominational allegiance.

== Roman Catholic ==
The Roman Catholic churches play an important role in the life of the Christian community in Harrogate. St Robert's in the town centre (with a chapel at St John Fisher Catholic High School) is the largest single church in the town, and there are also Catholic church at St Aelred's in the Fairfax area and St Joseph's in the north of the town.

== Methodist ==
Methodism in Harrogate has been a very important part of the religious landscape. Today much of the energy of Methodism is to be seen in chapels such as Woodlands and Bar Chapel. The remarkable town centre Wesley Chapel has a special relationship with St Peter's, and Trinity Chapel on the Stray has been through a recent re-ordering to equip it for ministry in the future.

Traditional non-conformist churches Victoria Avenue in the town centre was designed as the home for a range of non-conformist churches, including today St Paul's and West Park United Reformed Churches, and Harrogate Baptist Church. The Quaker meeting house (Religious Society of Friends) is just round the corner on Queens Parade.

The town Mission on Mayfield Grove later became the Evangelical Free Church, then Mayfield Community Church and latterly Mowbray Community church, having sold the Victorian church premises.

== New churches ==
A wide range of new churches have grown up in Harrogate and make a significant contribution to the life of the town. These included New Life (meeting at the Cedar Court Hotel), Life Destiny Church (sharing premises with Starbeck Methodist Church), Jennyfields Evangelical Church, and several others.

== Churches Together ==
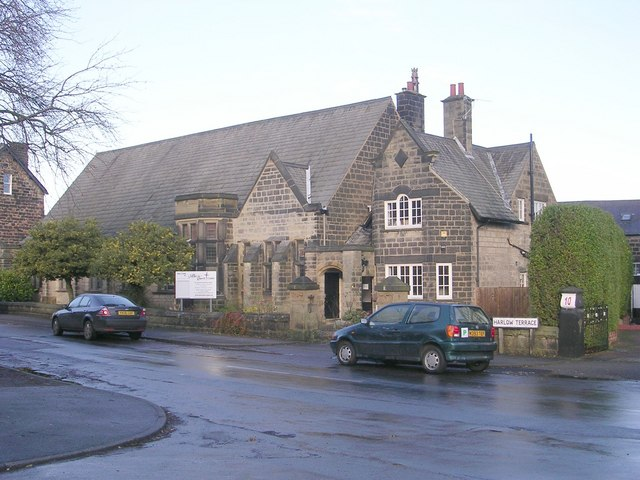
St Mary's Church Centre - Harlow Terrace

Churches Together in Harrogate is an umbrella organisation for the churches encouraging action together and seeking to help the churches become "post-tribal". It plays an important role in building relationships between the different churches, and ministers from across the many different churches meet regularly.

== See also ==
- List of places of worship in Harrogate
- Wesleyan Methodist Chapel, Grove Road, Harrogate
