= List of places of worship in Harrogate =

Below is a list of places of worship in Harrogate, North Yorkshire by denomination.

== Baptist ==
- Harrogate Baptist Church

== Church of England ==
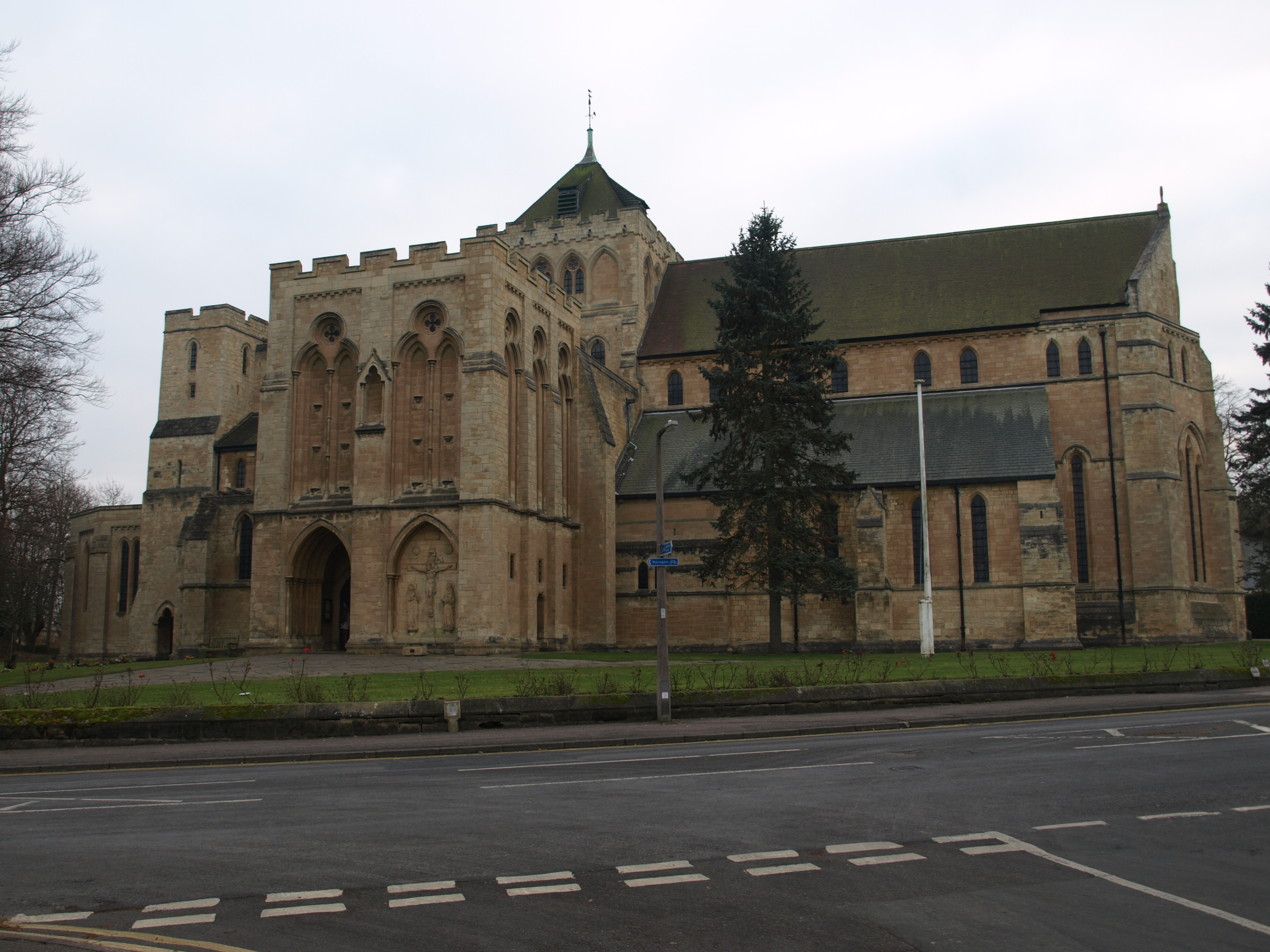
St. Wilfrid's Church, Harrogate

- Christ Church, High Harrogate
- St Aidan's High School Chapel
- St James' Church, Birstwith
- St John's Church, Bilton
- St Luke's Church, Bilton
- St. Mark's Church, Harrogate
- St. Mary's Church, Harrogate, now known as Kairos Church
- St. Peter's Church, Harrogate
- St Robert's Church, Pannal
- St. Wilfrid's Church, Harrogate

== Methodist ==
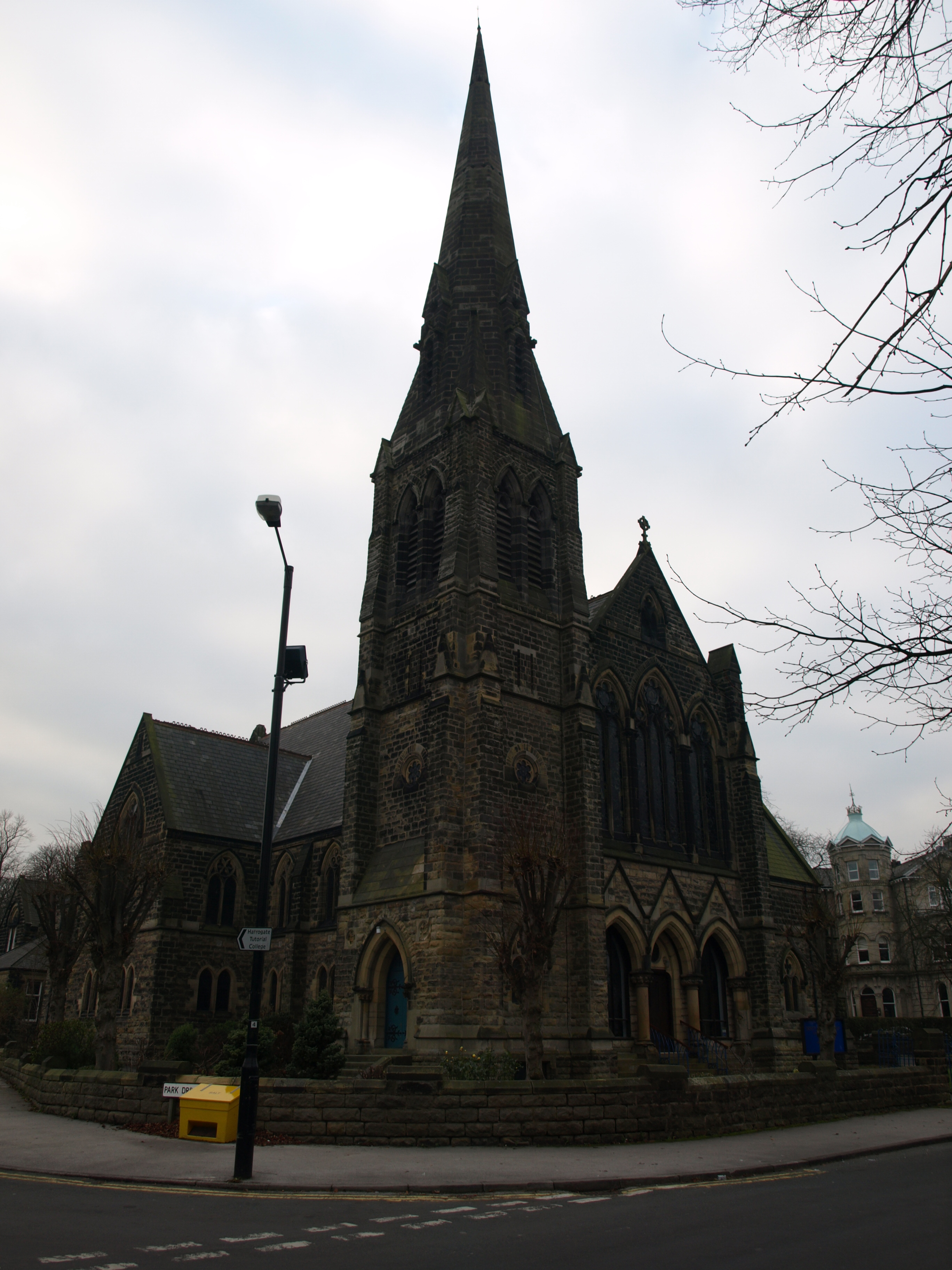
Trinity Methodist Church, Harrogate

=== Current churches ===
The Methodist churches in Harrogate are all part of the Nidd Valley Circuit in the Yorkshire North and East District, formerly (before 2017) part of the Leeds District.

- Bilton Area Methodist Church
- Harlow Hill Methodist Church
- Killinghall Methodist Church, Ripon Road
- Pannal Methodist Church
- Starbeck Methodist Church
- Trinity Methodist Church
- Wesley Chapel
- Woodlands Methodist Church

=== Former churches ===
- The property at 20 Park Parade was used as a Methodist chapel from 1796. It later became a club house, with other subsequent uses.
- The former Wesleyan Chapel on Grove Road, now a guest house, is a Grade II listed Italianate building, dating from 1896.

== Roman Catholic ==
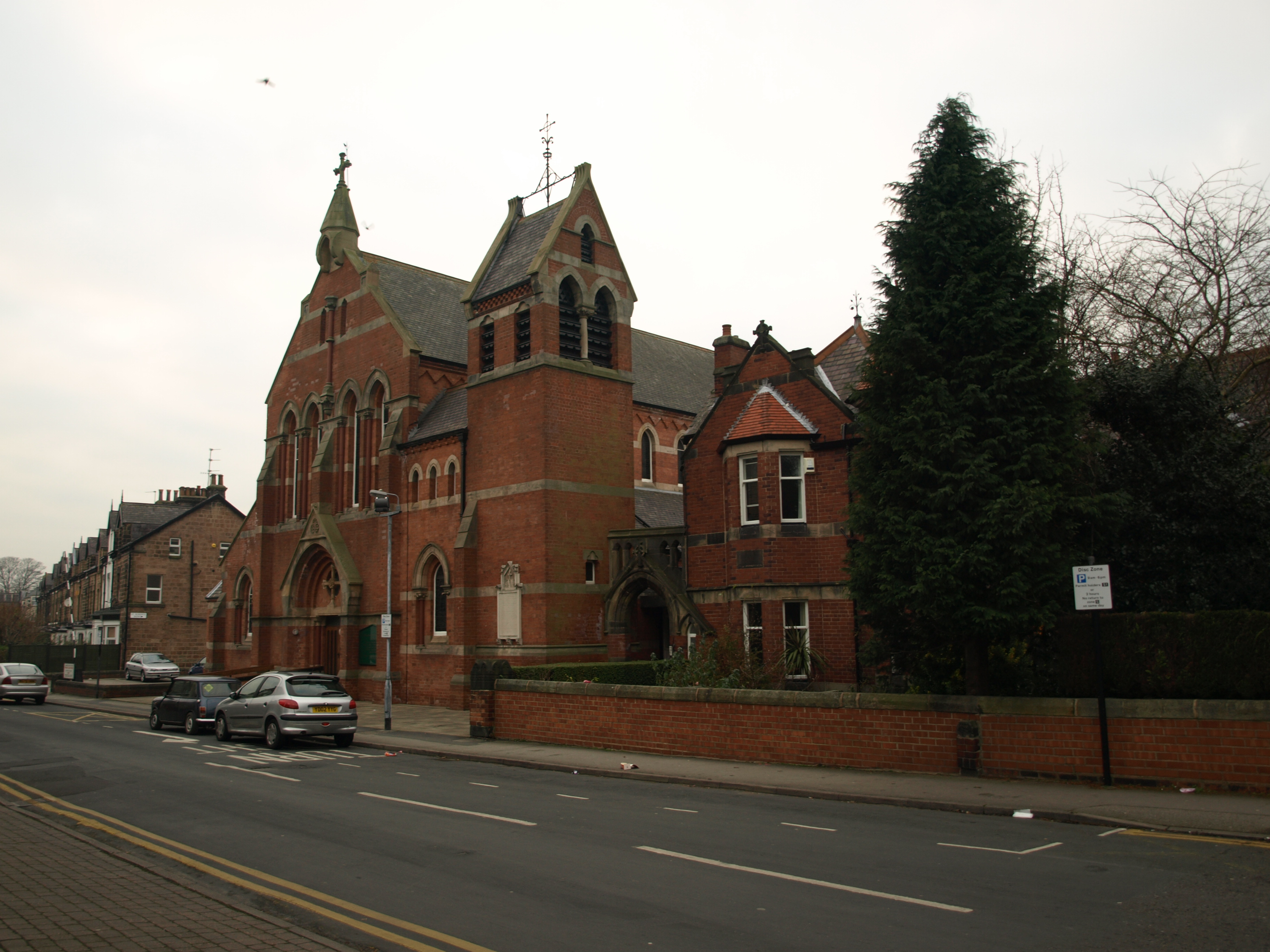
St. Robert's Church, Harrogate

- St. Aelred's Church, 71 Woodlands Drive
- St. Joseph's Church
- St. Robert's Church

== United Reformed ==
- Bilton Grange URC, Woodfield Road, founded in 1906 as a 'Church Plant' from Victoria Avenue Congregational Church, with services initially held in temporary premises on Skipton Road now known as the "Jehovah's Witnesses Hall".
- St. Paul's Church, Victoria Avenue
- West Park United Reformed Church, Harrogate

== Other ==
- Christadelphians, Pannal Memorial Hall, Station Road
- Harrogate District Hospital Chapel. The chapel is located on the ground floor of Harrogate District Hospital, near Littondale Ward.
- Harrogate Elim Church, Park View. An Elim Pentecostal Church, the church has been meeting in Harrogate since 1952 and is part of the Elim Foursquare Gospel Alliance.
- Harrogate Hebrew Congregation (Harrogate Shul), St Mary's Walk. The first Harrogate synagogue was established in 1918, using rooms over an antique shop in the Montpelier Quarter. The community moved to the current site (a former church school building) in 1925. The present building was opened in 1968.
- Harrogate New Life Church
- Latter Day Saints Chapel, Wetherby Road
- Life Destiny Church
- Mayfield Community Church
- Society of Friends Meeting House, Queen Parade
