= County Hotel =

Hotel in Harrogate, North Yorkshire, England

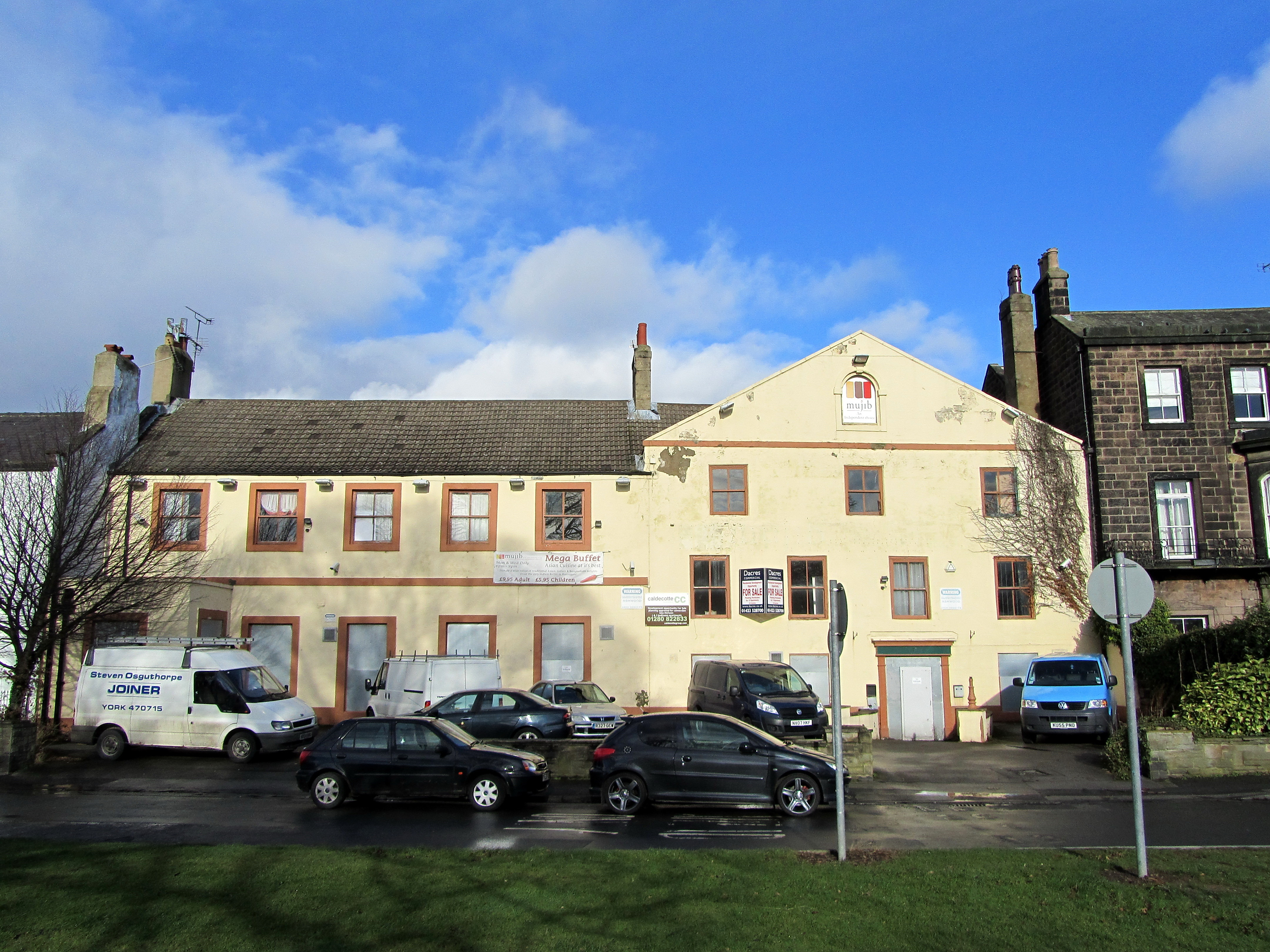
The building, in 2013

The County Hotel is a historic building in Harrogate, a town in North Yorkshire, in England.

The hotel was the fourth to open in Harrogate, and was built about 1700, when it was known as the "Salutation". It offered stabling, and was cheaper than its rivals: the Granby Hotel, Queen Hotel, and Dragon. It appears to have been rebuilt in about 1830, incorporating a neighbouring house. The hotel was later renamed the "Hope Inn", then in the 1820s as "Gascoigne's Hotel". It passed through many owners, and at various times hosted auctions, church services, and meetings of the Harrogate Gentleman's Club. It was grade II listed in 1975. In the 1990s, it was renamed the "County Hotel", but it later closed and was converted into housing.

The building is constructed of gritstone, and consists of two blocks. The left block has two storeys and five bays, a floor band and a slate roof. The right block has three storeys and an attic and four bays, a pedimented gable, and a tile roof. The doorway has a fanlight, the windows in both parts are sashes and in the tympanum of the pediment is a round-arched window with imposts and a keystone. The end bays have niches containing statues. There is a porch, which was added later.

Behind the former hotel is a separate building, also listed at grade II. It was long believed to be a gin store, but more recent work suggests that it was built in the late 19th century as a billiard room.

== See also ==
- Listed buildings in Harrogate (High Harrogate Ward)
