= Mansfield House =

Historic building in Harrogate, England

Coordinates: 53°59′41″N 1°31′26″W

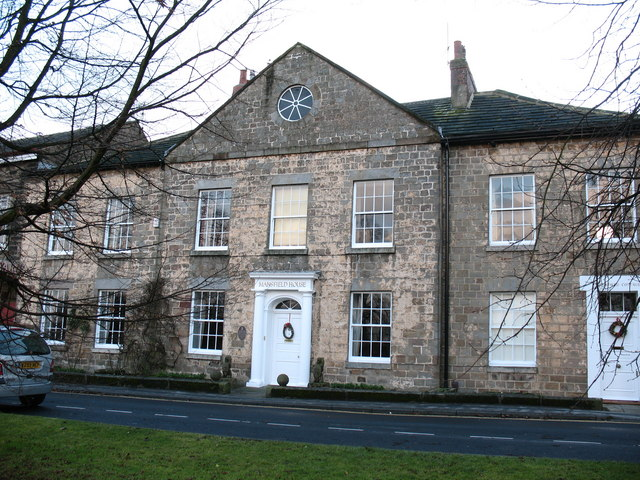
The building, in 2008

Mansfield House is a historic building in Harrogate, a town in North Yorkshire, in England.

The building was constructed in 1788, as the first purpose-built theatre in the town. Performances had previously been conducted in a nearby barn, behind the Granby Hotel. The theatre closed in 1830, and its interior was entirely altered, to serve as lodgings. It was later converted into three houses: Mansfield House in the central section, flanked by Mansfield Cottage and Mews Cottage. The entire building was grade II listed in 1975.

The building is constructed of gritstone, and has a stone slate roof with coped gables. There are two storeys and seven bays, the middle three bays projecting under a pediment containing a blind lunette window. In the centre is a Tuscan doorcase with a semi-elliptical head and a radial fanlight, and to the right is a doorway with a plain surround and a fanlight. The windows are recessed sashes.

== See also ==
- Listed buildings in Harrogate (High Harrogate Ward)
