= St Luke's Court =

Church building in Harrogate, North Yorkshire, England

Coordinates: 54°00′00″N 1°32′20″W

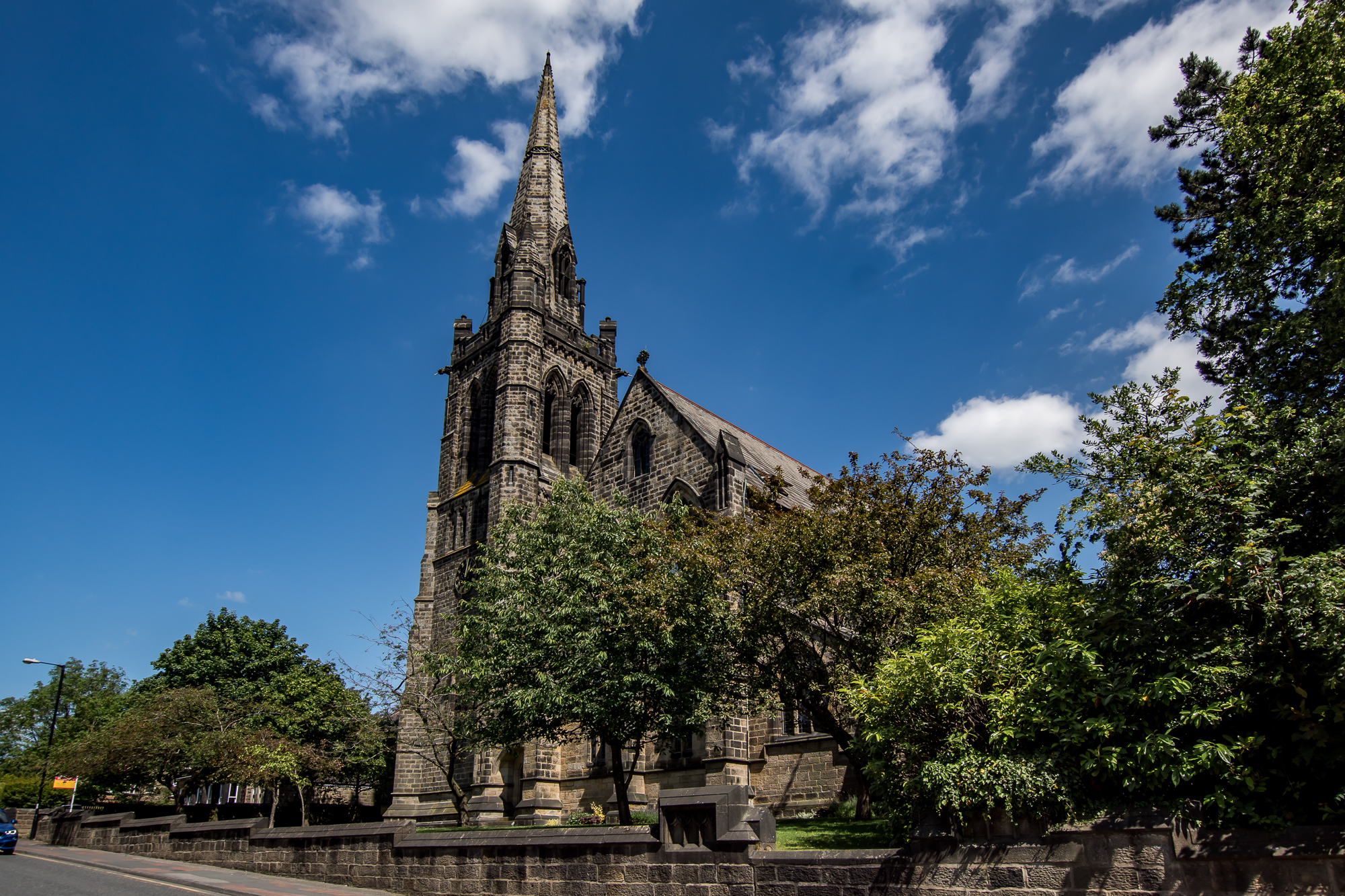
The church, in 2019

St Luke's Court is a historic building in Harrogate, a town in North Yorkshire, in England.

The population of the High Harrogate area grew in the late 19th century, and in the 1890s, it was decided to build a new church in the parish of Christ Church, High Harrogate. A site off Walker Road was purchased for £1,400, and a building was designed by Thomas and Francis Healey, in the Decorated Gothic style. Work started in 1895, and the church was consecrated on 18 October 1897. The church cost £8,000 to build, and could seat 500 worshippers. A tower and spire were added in 1902, and a clock in 1903. In 1974, a new St Luke's Church was constructed. The old church was grade II listed in 1975, but it was closed in 1980. The building was converted into 29 flats, with work completed in 1983.

The building is constructed of gritstone with a slate roof, and is in Decorated style. It consists of a nave with a clerestory, north and south aisles, a southwest porch, north and south transepts, a chancel, and a west steeple. The east window has five lights, and contains stained glass by Burlison and Grylls.

== See also ==
- Listed buildings in Harrogate (High Harrogate Ward)
