= Victoria Hotel =

Victoria Hotel or Hotel Victoria may refer to:

- Hotel Victoria (Toronto), Ontario, Canada
- Radisson Montevideo Victoria Plaza Hotel, Montevideo, Uruguay
- The Royal Victoria Hotel, Newport, Shropshire, England, UK
- Victoria Hotel, Adelaide, built by William Williams in 1840
- Victoria Hotel, Amsterdam, Netherlands
- Victoria Hotel, Darwin, Northern Territory, Australia
- Victoria Hotel, Menai Bridge, Wales
- Victoria Hotel (Toodyay), Western Australia

== See also ==
- The Empress Hotel
