= Empress Hotel =

Empress Hotel may refer to:

- Empress Hotel, Fitzroy North, Melbourne
- Empress Hotel (Toronto), destroyed by fire
- The Empress (hotel), Victoria, British Columbia
- The Empress Hotel (New Jersey), in Asbury Park
- Empress Hotel, Harrogate, in England
