= Listed buildings in Birstwith =

Birstwith is a civil parish in the county of North Yorkshire, England. It contains 14 listed buildings that are recorded in the National Heritage List for England. All the listed buildings are designated at Grade II, the lowest of the three grades, which is applied to "buildings of national importance and special interest". The parish contains the village of Birstwith and the surrounding countryside. The listed buildings include a country house converted into a school, its lodge, smaller houses, cottages and associated structures, farmhouses and farm buildings, a bridge and a church.

== Buildings ==
Name and location	Photograph	Date	Notes
Tang House and Cottage, wall and piers 54.01846°N 1.63848°W	—	17th century	The cottage is the older part, with the house dated 1754. They are in gritstone, the cottage has a cruck framed core and a thatched roof, and the house has a purple slate roof. The house has quoins, two storeys and two bays. In the centre is a doorway has an eared architrave and a pitched hood on stone brackets, the windows are mullioned with three lights, and above the doorway is an inscribed and dated plaque in an architrave. The cottage has a single storey and an attic, and two bays. The doorway is on the right, the windows are recessed with chamfered mullions, and on the left is a raised verge with coping and a kneeler. The garden wall is about 1.2 metres (3 ft 11 in) high, and it contains two pairs of gate piers and a corner pier, all square, with finials.
Oldstead; 54.01754°N 1.65412°W		Late 17th century	The house, which was later extended, is in gritstone, the original part has a pantile roof with gritstone slabs to the eaves, and the extension roof is in stone slate. There are two storeys, the original part has three bays, and the lower extension has two. In the centre of the original part is a gabled porch with a stone bench to the left, and a doorway with a quoined surround. There is one casement window in the upper floor, and the other windows are mullioned.
New Bridge Cottage; 54.03732°N 1.64173°W		1688	The house is in gritstone with quoins and a blue slate roof. There are two storeys, three bays, and a lower single-storey single-bay extension on the left. The doorway has a moulded quoined surround, and a deep moulded lintel with initials and the date. Most of the windows are recessed with chamfered mullions, and those in the ground floor have a continuous hood mould. In the extension is a large 20th-century window and a casement above.
Barn north of Tang House; 54.01921°N 1.63797°W	—	Mid 18th century	The barn is in stone with quoins and a thatched roof. There is a single storey, and it contains two doorways, one with a massive lintel.
West House Farm Cottage; 54.03775°N 1.62679°W	—	1760	A gritstone house with quoins, and a stone slate roof with gable copings and shaped kneelers. There are two storeys, three bays and a rear outshut. The central doorway has jambs with tie-stones, and an inscribed and dated lintel. Above the doorway is a narrow round-headed window, and the other windows are sashes with mullions removed.
Stable, byre and barn range southeast of New Bridge Cottage; 54.03690°N 1.64142°W	—	Mid to late 18th century	The range is in gritstone, with quoins, and a stone slate roof with gable] copings and shaped kneelers. There are two storeys and three bays. In the ground floor is a stable door with a quoined surround and a segmental-arched lintel, a byre door with quoined jambs and a large lintel, and a barn entrance with a quoined surround and a segmental-arched head. The upper floor contains openings, one with a quoined surround.
Nidd House; 54.03781°N 1.63353°W	—	1795	The house is in grey sandy gritstone, and has a roof of blue slate with gable coping and shaped kneelers. There are two storeys, a double depth plan, and three bays. The central doorway has square-cut jambs, and a dated and initialled lintel. The windows are sashes with projecting surrounds.
Hirst Grove; 54.02440°N 1.62615°W	—	c. 1800	The house is in gritstone with a grey slate roof. There are two storeys and three bays. In the centre of the east front is a doorway with a fanlight in a round-arched surround. At the rear is a later porch, above which is a tall round-arched staircase window. The other windows on both fronts are sashes.
West House; 54.03686°N 1.62790°W	—	Late 18th to early 19th century	A gritstone house with quoins, an eaves band, and a grey-blue slate roof with gable coping and shaped kneelers. There are two storeys and three bays. The central doorway has long and short jambs, and the windows are sashes.
New Bridge; 54.03810°N 1.64159°W		1822	The bridge carries a track over the River Nidd. It is in gritstone, possibly incorporating earlier material, and is paved with river cobbles. The bridge consists of a single round arch with a span of about 20 metres (66 ft), and has a roadway 2 metres (6 ft 7 in) wide. It has voussoirs, a projecting band, and rounded parapet coping. The parapet ends in square bollards with pyramidal caps, at each end of the bridge are bollards about 60 centimetres (24 in) high, and at the southwest end is a stone stile is built into the parapet.
Manor House and wall 54.01707°N 1.65566°W		1842	A gritstone house with deep eaves on wooden consoles, and a hipped grey slate roof. There are two storeys and rear cellars, a square plan and fronts of three bays. On the entrance front is a porch with Doric columns, an entablature and a cornice and a doorway with a fanlight. The windows in the ground floor are casements, in the upper floor they are sashes, and all are in architraves. The wall enclosing the garden has flat coping, and it contains a gate and a door.
Former Swarcliffe Hall; 54.03023°N 1.64202°W		1848–50	A country house designed by Rohde Hawkins in Jacobethan style, it was extended in 1866–67, and later converted into a school. The original house is square with two storeys and three bays, there is a larger wing to the north, at the rear is a four-storey tower and a service wing. The main doorway has a Tudor arch and a hood mould, and is flanked by projecting gabled wings containing oriel windows, mullioned and transomed windows with hood moulds, gable copings, and ball finials. The tower has corner pinnacles and a turret.
Lodge, former Swarcliffe Hall; 54.02819°N 1.64044°W	—	c. 1850	The lodge is in stone on a plinth, with a moulded band, oversailing eaves, and a hipped slate roof. There are two storeys and fronts of one and three bays. On the front facing the drive is a porch containing a round arch with an impost and a keystone, and in the returns are round-arched niches. To the right is a screen wall with an impost band, to the left are sash window, and above is a dormer with casements and a coped gable. There is a similar dormer on the front facing the road.
St James' Church; 54.03067°N 1.63676°W		1856–57	The church was designed by Rohde Hawkins, and the vestry and organ chamber were added in 1887. The church is built in gritstone with grey slate roofs. It consists of a nave, north and south aisles, a north porch, a chancel, a vestry and organ chamber, and a west steeple. The steeple has a tower with three stages, diagonal buttresses, a band, bell openings with pointed arches and hood moulds, and a broach spire with one tier of lucarnes.
