= Royal Victoria Patriotic Building =

School building

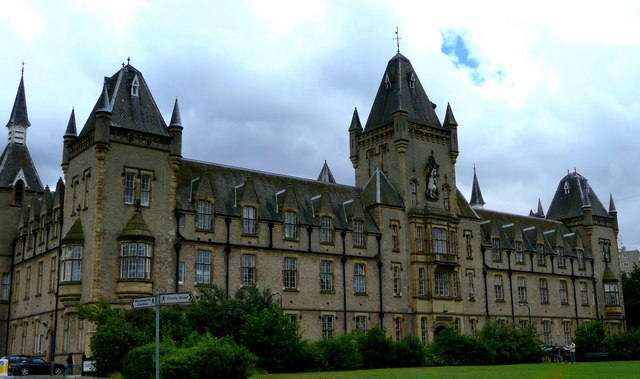
- The Royal Victoria Patriotic Building, Wandsworth, was built in 1859 as an "asylum" for girls orphaned in the Crimean War.
- Interactive map of Royal Victoria Patriotic Building
- 51.4532°N 0.1748°W
- Location: John Archer Way, Wandsworth, London SW18 3SX

History
- Built: 1857–1859

Site notes
- Architect: Major Rohde Hawkins
- Architectural styles: Scottish Baronial, Jacobean, French Châteauesque "Gothic"

Listed Building – Grade II*
- Designated: 3 October 1973
- Reference no.: 1065496

The Royal Victoria Patriotic Building is a large Victorian building in a Gothic Revival style combining Scottish Baronial and French Châteauesque. It is located off Trinity Road in Wandsworth, London. It was built in 1859 as the Royal Victoria Patriotic School, by popular subscription as an asylum for girls orphaned during the Crimean War. It is a Grade II* Listed Building designed by the architect Major Rohde Hawkins.

== Architecture ==
=== Exterior ===
The building's architect was Major Rohde Hawkins (1821–84). It is made of yellow brick with York stone dressings. It consists of three storeys arranged around two courtyards separated by a central main hall. There is an additional single-storey court on the east side. The roof is steeply pitched with slate. The metal-framed windows are mullioned and transomed. The style is a combination of Scottish baronial, Jacobean and French Châteauesque architecture. There are five major towers (three at the front) with pyramidal roofs, and many smaller corner turrets (tourelles). The central tower at the front has a projecting frontispiece three storeys high; above it is a statue of St George and the Dragon in a niche.

=== Interior ===
Much of the interior detail has now been lost, so the interior is mostly quite plain; some rooms have surviving boarded roofs. A wallplate in the main hall has carved foliage. The main hall's roof is in three sections; it was painted by J.G. Crace.

== History ==
=== Nineteenth century ===
The Royal Victoria Patriotic Building is a Grade II* Gothic Revival listed building on the edge of Wandsworth Common, South West London. It was built as the school of the Royal Victoria Patriotic Asylum on land enclosed from Wandsworth Common, one of 53 such enclosures made (lawfully) in the years between 1794 and 1866. The building was designed by Rohde Hawkins in the then popular Gothic style. The foundation stone was laid by Queen Victoria on 11 July 1857; the building was completed in only 18 months. The rapid construction was facilitated by offsite prefabrication of many components such as cast iron windows, stone dressings, roof trusses, iron floor joists and decorative pieces of leadwork.

The money for the building came from Prince Albert's Royal Patriotic Fund, which raised nearly £1.5 million by public subscription for the widows and orphans of soldiers killed in the Crimean War. However, only £35,000 was actually used in the building's construction by George Myers of Lambeth.

The orphans lived in hard conditions; they had to pump water up to the tanks in the building's towers, do all the washing, and be washed outside in cold water. When the installed warm air heating system failed, no fireplaces were built in the orphans' quarters. The orphans were reportedly abused by the rector, one orphan dying as a result, leading to a scandal.

=== First World War ===
During the First World War, the building was requisitioned by the War Office to create the 3rd London General Hospital, a facility for the Royal Army Medical Corps to treat military casualties. It was refurbished with stronger roof trusses, repointed brickwork, new Westmoreland slates on the roof, and a new heating system. The field behind the hospital was packed with marquees holding about 1,800 soldiers wounded at the front; many thousands of soldiers were treated at the hospital during the war.

=== Between the wars ===
After the First World War, the building reverted to its earlier use as the Royal Victoria Patriotic School, still for girls, until the children were evacuated to Wales in 1939.

=== Second World War ===
During the Second World War, the building became the London Reception Centre, where 34,000 civilians arriving from occupied Europe were questioned in order to identify potential spies and gather intelligence. Fewer than 300 were detained further, with 50 confirmed as agents. Those who were suspected to be spies were sent on to Camp 020.

Even though the vast majority of those who were questioned were not spies, the information obtained from them on military and civilian matters in occupied territory was useful for many branches of government, as well as being used to challenge the cover stories of spies. Thousands of these files are publicly available at The National Archives (United Kingdom).

The importance of gathering this intelligence information, and the need to keep allies happy about the way their citizens were being looked after, meant that many efforts were made to make the camp a pleasant place to be, including pianos, films and books.

One famous MI5 interrogator was 'spycatcher' Colonel Oreste Pinto

=== Post war ===
After the Second World War, the building initially housed a teachers' training college. In 1952 it was bought by London County Council; from 1955 it housed Honeywell Secondary Mixed School, followed by Spencer Park Comprehensive School for Boys until 1974. As the building aged, it became structurally unsafe and the school moved to a new building.

From 1974, the Royal Victoria Patriotic Building fell into disrepair, losing most of its windows, and thousands of feral pigeons moved in. Thieves stole lead from the roofs and water tanks, allowing rain into the building's fabric: dry rot then destroyed much of the timber structure including floors and door frames. The building came under threat of demolition, but was saved by campaigning by the Victorian Society and the Wandsworth Society, and became a Grade II listed building.

In 1980 the Greater London Council (GLC), successor to London County Council, granted a lease with the option to buy the building for £1 to a developer, Tuberg Property Company. Restoration took six years. Just before formal handover by the GLC, the main hall with its elaborate hammer beam ceiling was destroyed by arson. The hall was fully restored from a photographic survey which luckily had been made two weeks earlier.

The Civic Trust awarded a commendation in 1985 for the hall ceiling. In 1987 the Civic Trust awarded another commendation for the restoration of the building as a whole. Also in 1987, the restoration won the Europa Nostra Order of Merit.

== Use ==
The building was refurbished in the 1980s, and now houses a variety of small businesses, 29 flats and the "Le Gothique" restaurant. The restaurant hosts the Wandsworth Common Beer Festival twice a year.
