= Starbeck Hall =

House in Harrogate, North Yorkshire, England

Coordinates: 53°59′53″N 1°30′12″W

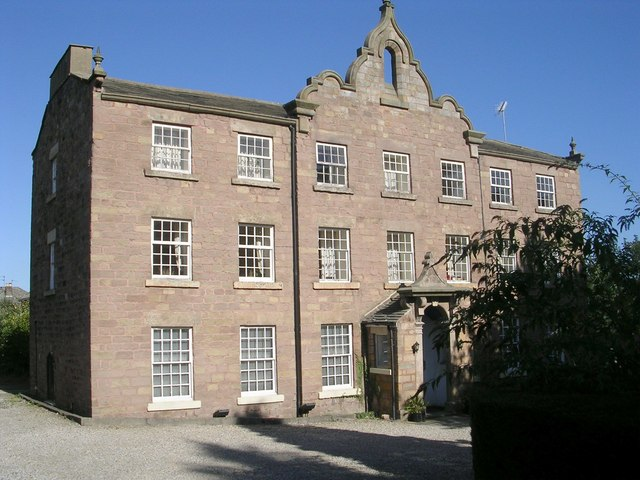
The building, in 2009

Starbeck Hall is a historic building in Starbeck, a suburb of Harrogate, a town in North Yorkshire, in England.

The building was constructed between 1810 and 1811 as the town's workhouse. It replaced a smaller building at Land Green Farm, near Pannal. In 1854, a new Poor Law Union was established, based in Knaresborough, and in 1858 a new workhouse was opened there. The old building was converted into the Beech Grove Academy boarding school, and then later into apartments, named Starbeck Hall. The building was grade II listed in 1975.

The building is constructed of stone, with an eaves cornice, and a tile roof with a coped shaped gable containing a round-headed arch surmounted by an urn, and kneelers with finials. It has three storeys and seven bays, the middle three bays projecting. In the centre is a porch set in an earlier porch, with a cornice on bracketed consoles, and the windows are recessed sashes.

== See also ==
- Listed buildings in Harrogate (Starbeck Ward)
