= Swarcliffe Hall =

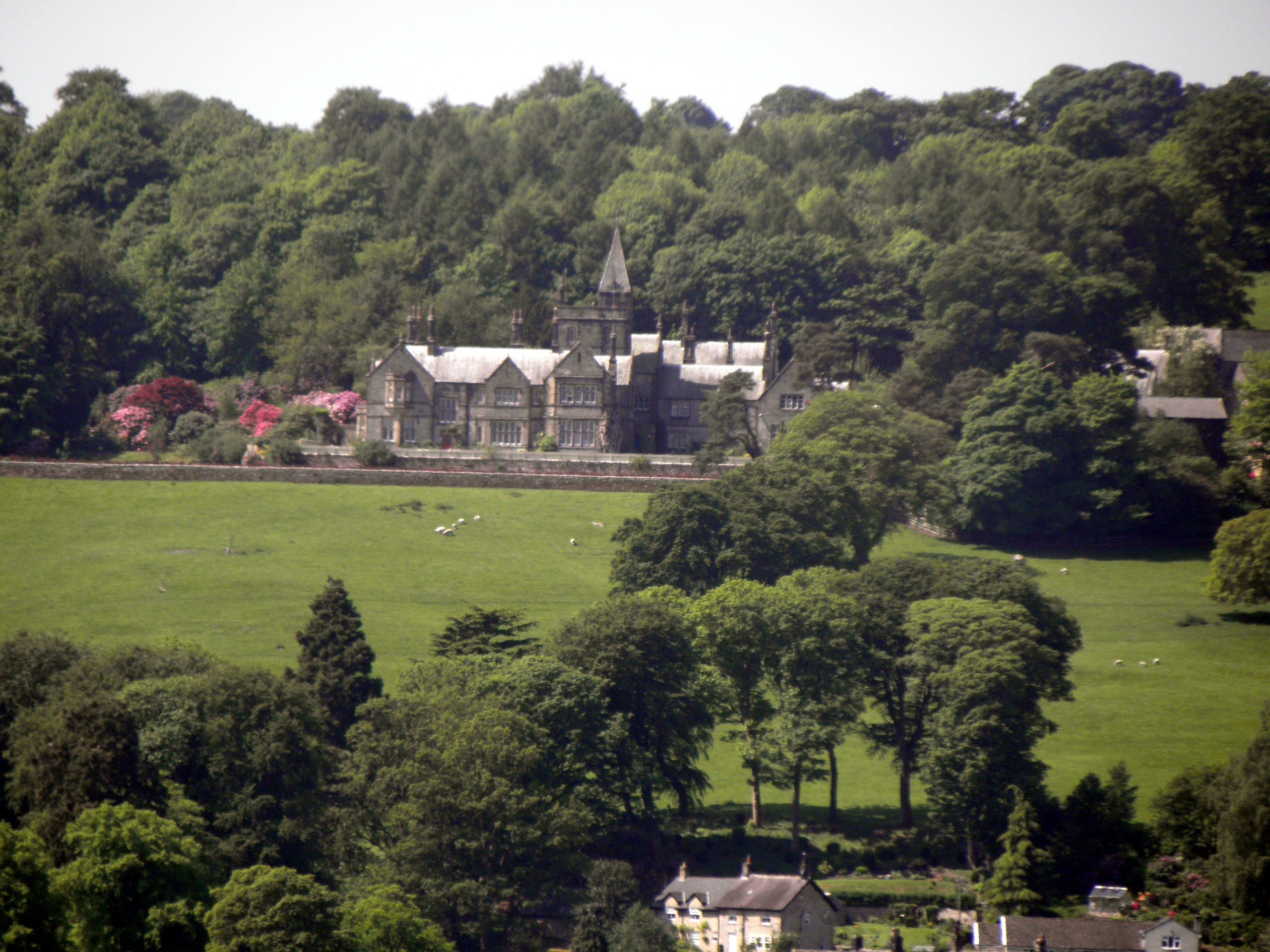
- Grosvenor House School
- Interactive map of the Swarcliffe Hall area

General information
- Location: Harrogate, England
- Coordinates: 54.03006°N 1.64273°W
- Completed: 1850
- Client: Greenwood family

Swarcliffe Hall is a large hall that was constructed in 1800 in Birstwith, near Harrogate, England. The current house was built by John Greenwood in 1850, who engaged Major Rohde Hawkins as his architect, and is a Grade II listed building.

== History ==
The original Swarcliffe Hall was built on the site c1800 by the Blessard family, however the current hall which was built by the Greenwood family was completed in 1850. Charlotte Brontë was employed as a governess at the hall in 1839 and it is said her time spent there helped inspire her novel Jane Eyre.

Prince Albert Victor, Duke of Clarence and Avondale visited the hall in 1888 and again during the following year whilst opening the New Bath Hospital in nearby Harrogate.

== Later years ==
Swarcliffe Hall was advertised for private sale in 1973, described as a freehold "spacious and imposing residence" with four reception rooms, seven bedrooms and five bathrooms; the eight-acre grounds also included stable blocks, garages, an entrance lodge, staff flats and a cottage. It has been converted during recent years and now houses Belmont Grosvenor School.

== See also ==
- Listed buildings in Birstwith
