= Birstwith =

Village and civil parish in North Yorkshire, England

Coordinates: 54°01′52″N 1°38′04″W

- Location within North Yorkshire
- Population: 868 (2011 census)
- OS grid reference: SE239595
  - London: 185 mi (298 km) SSE
- Civil parish: Birstwith
- Unitary authority: North Yorkshire
- Ceremonial county: North Yorkshire
- Region: Yorkshire and the Humber
- Country: England
- Sovereign state: United Kingdom
- Post town: HARROGATE
- Postcode district: HG3
- Police: North Yorkshire
- Fire: North Yorkshire
- Ambulance: Yorkshire

Birstwith is a village and civil parish in Nidderdale in North Yorkshire, England. It is situated on the River Nidd. According to the 2001 census, the parish had a population of 756 and increased to 868 based on the 2011 Census.

Until 1974 it was part of the West Riding of Yorkshire. From 1974 to 2023 it was part of the Borough of Harrogate, it is now administered by the unitary North Yorkshire Council.

The name Birstwith derives from the Old Norse býjarstaðr meaning 'farmstead'.

Birstwith Mill on Wreaks Road is run by Kerry Ingredients, a food products manufacturer. The River Nidd provided water for the mill, and although sluice gates and a mill race exist, the water wheel no longer turns—an existing weir provides the mill with a head of water. The mill race rejoins the river downstream. About 1 mile (1.6 km) upstream is a packhorse bridge.

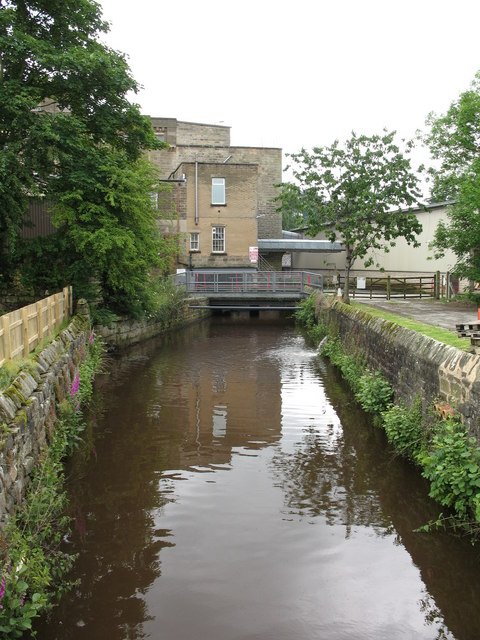
A mill race on the Nidd at Birstwith

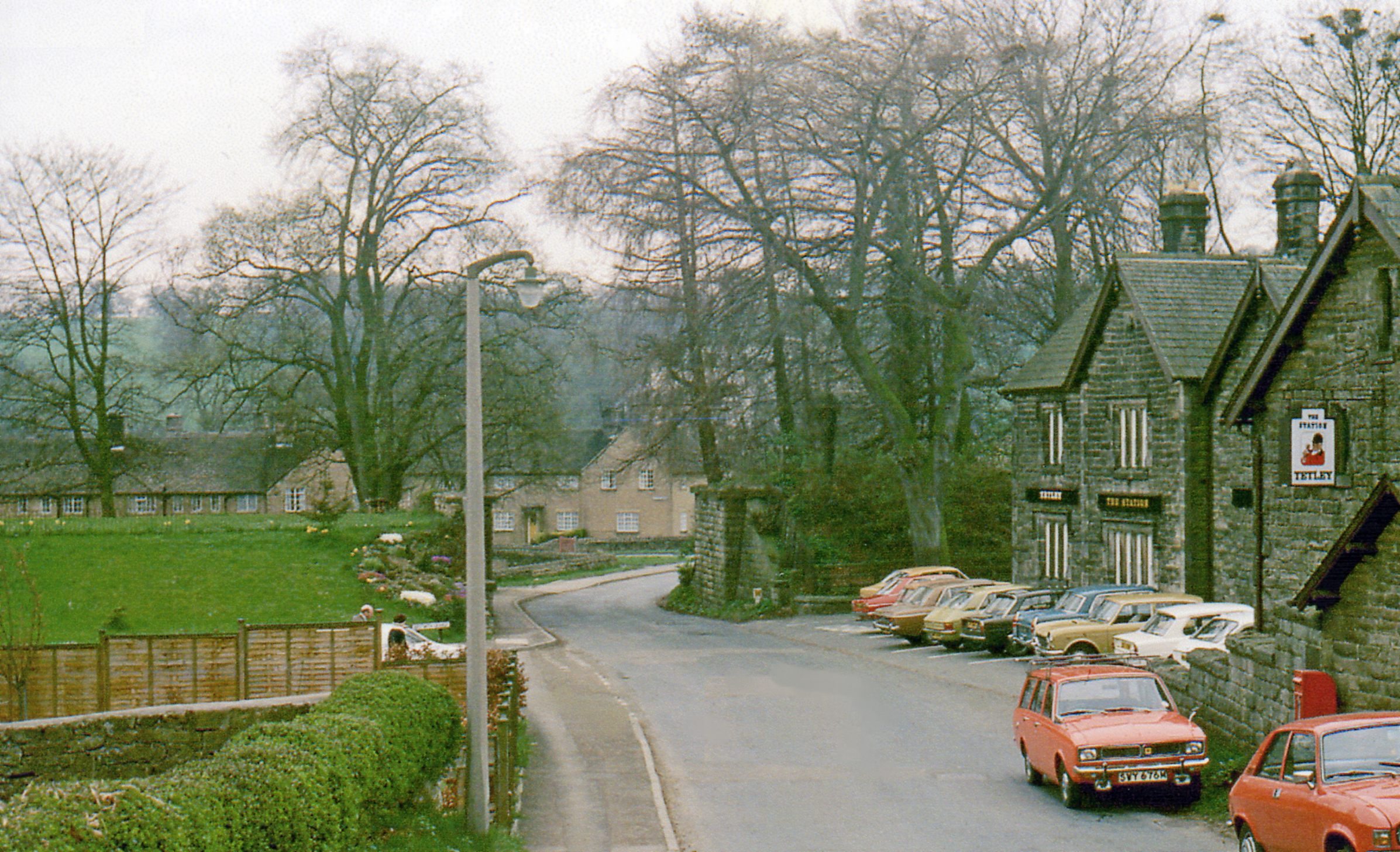
Site of Birstwith station, 1976

The local public house is the Station Hotel which acts as a meeting place, and venue for organised charity events such as the Birstwith Coast 2 Coast Cycle Challenge. The village has a store and post office, and a doctor's surgery which is part of a Nidderdale medical group. Sport facilities include a cricket pitch, tennis courts, and a snooker room.

The village had a railway station on the NER line running between Harrogate and Pateley Bridge. The goods yard became Birstwith Grange, a housing development for commuters. The railway line continued along the Nidd Valley and was used in the construction of Scar House and Angram reservoirs.

A village primary school and a Reading Room, built and donated by the owner of the local Swarcliffe Hall around 1880, still exist today. In the mid-1970s Swarcliffe Hall was sold and the contents auctioned, the building became a private prep school. Today Birstwith has a Church of England primary school, and a private school which occupy Swarcliffe Hall.

St James' Church, Birstwith was completed in 1857 and is a grade II listed building.

In 2017 Birstwith In Bloom was established. Birstwith won a Silver-gilt at the Yorkshire in Bloom awards, this was the first time the village had entered the competition.

== See also ==
- Listed buildings in Birstwith
