= Listed buildings in Harrogate (Starbeck Ward) =

Starbeck is a ward in the town of Harrogate, North Yorkshire, England. It contains ten listed buildings that are recorded in the National Heritage List for England. All the listed buildings are designated at Grade II, the lowest of the three grades, which is applied to "buildings of national importance and special interest". The parish contains the village of Starbeck, a suburb of Harrogate. The listed buildings consist of a former toll house, a former workhouse, buildings associated with a spa, a school and schoolmasters' houses, a church and a war memorial.

== Buildings ==
Name and location	Photograph	Date	Notes
Toll Gate House; 54.00282°N 1.49491°W		18th century	A toll house, later altered and a private house, it is in stone, and has a stone slate roof with coped gables and kneelers. There are two storeys and three bays, and a single-storey two-bay extension in the right. The doorway is in the centre of the main block, and the windows are recessed casements.
Starbeck Hall; 53.99794°N 1.50347°W		1810	A workhouse, later used for other purposes, in stone, with an eaves cornice, and a tile roof with a coped shaped gable containing a round-headed arch surmounted by an urn, and kneelers with finials. There are three storeys and seven bays, the middle three bays projecting. In the centre is a porch set in an earlier porch, with a cornice on bracketed consoles, and the windows are recessed sashes.
Spa Mews; 53.99711°N 1.49608°W		c. 1824	A cottage and attached outbuildings in gritstone. The cottage is in Tudor style, with an embattled parapet, and a slate roof with coped gables. There are two storeys and three bays, the outer bays projecting and taller. In the centre is an arched doorway with a fanlight, above it is a lancet window, and the other windows are mullioned casements; all the openings have hood moulds. To the right is a range of outbuildings with an embattled parapet and two storeys, containing arched doorways and windows with hood moulds.
Fountain, Spa Mews; 53.99711°N 1.49631°W		Early 19th century	The well-head in the forecourt of Spa Mews is in stone and has a polygonal plan. It has traceried side panels and a pyramidal top.
Gateway, Spa Mews; 53.99740°N 1.49691°W		Early 19th century	The gateway is in stone, and consists of a four-centred arch with an embattled parapet, flanked by buttresses and traceried panelling.
107 High Street; 54.00163°N 1.49647°W	—	1896	A schoolmaster's house in stone, with a hipped slate roof, coped gables, kneelers and ball finials. There are two storeys and two bays on the front. On the left is a segmental-arched doorway, and the windows are mullioned, the window in the upper floor on the right a gabled through-eaves dormer. On the right return is a similar dormer and a two-storey square bay window.
109 High Street; 54.00186°N 1.49623°W	—	1896	A schoolmaster's house in stone, with a hipped slate roof, coped gables, kneelers and ball finials. There are two storeys and two bays on the front. On the right is a segmental entfance arch, and the windows are mullioned, the window in the upper floor on the left a gabled through-eaves dormer. On the left return are two similar dormers and a two-storey square bay window.
Primary School; 54.00188°N 1.49663°W		1896	The school is in stone, and has slate roofs with stone coped gables, kneelers and ball finials. At the front is a single-storey entrance block with a hipped roof, flanked by recessed porches with moulded segmental arches, and coped parapets with lettered plaques. Behind, is a large central gable, and the windows are cross-mullioned. On the roof is a square wooden cupola with a pyramidal slate roof, and at the rear is an octagonal ventilator.
St Andrew's Church; 53.99954°N 1.49794°W		1909–10	The church, designed by Austin and Paley, is in stone with slate roofs. It consists of a nave with a clerestory, north and south aisles, north and south porches, north and south transepts, and a chancel. On the north wall to the west is a bellcote. The west end is canted, with a clock face on the north, and it contains a five-light pointed-arched window and a parapet. At the east end is as five-light window with a segmental-arched head.
War memorial 54.00170°N 1.49623°W		c. 1920	The war memorial consists of a square stone pier on two shallow steps on a square base. On each corner are recessed pilasters, and on each face is a recessed panel containing a bronze plaque with names. Above it is a carved laurel wreath, and on the top is a moulded cornice, and a stepped pyramidal cap.
