= Starbeck =

Village in North Yorkshire, England

Coordinates: 53°59′55″N 1°29′59″W

Starbeck High Street

Starbeck is a village and suburb of Harrogate in North Yorkshire, England. The population of Starbeck Ward taken at the 2011 census was 6,226. It has many facilities, including Starbeck railway station, which serves the Harrogate Line.

== History ==
Starbeck reputedly takes its name from the 'Star Beck' (Old Norse stǫrr bekkr "sedge brook"), which flows into the Crimple Beck, a tributary of the Nidd.

Starbeck was originally a hamlet in the township of Bilton with Harrogate in the ancient parish of Knaresborough. The township was part of the ancient Royal Forest of Knaresborough, which is situated to the south of the River Nidd. In 1896 Starbeck became a separate civil parish, but in 1938 the civil parish was abolished and Starbeck was absorbed into the Municipal Borough of Harrogate.

In 1811, the Harrogate Workhouse was built in Starbeck. In 1858 the workhouse was closed because of the opening of the Knaresborough Workhouse.

The former Harrogate General Hospital was served by a nurses home in Starbeck.

=== The railways come to Starbeck ===
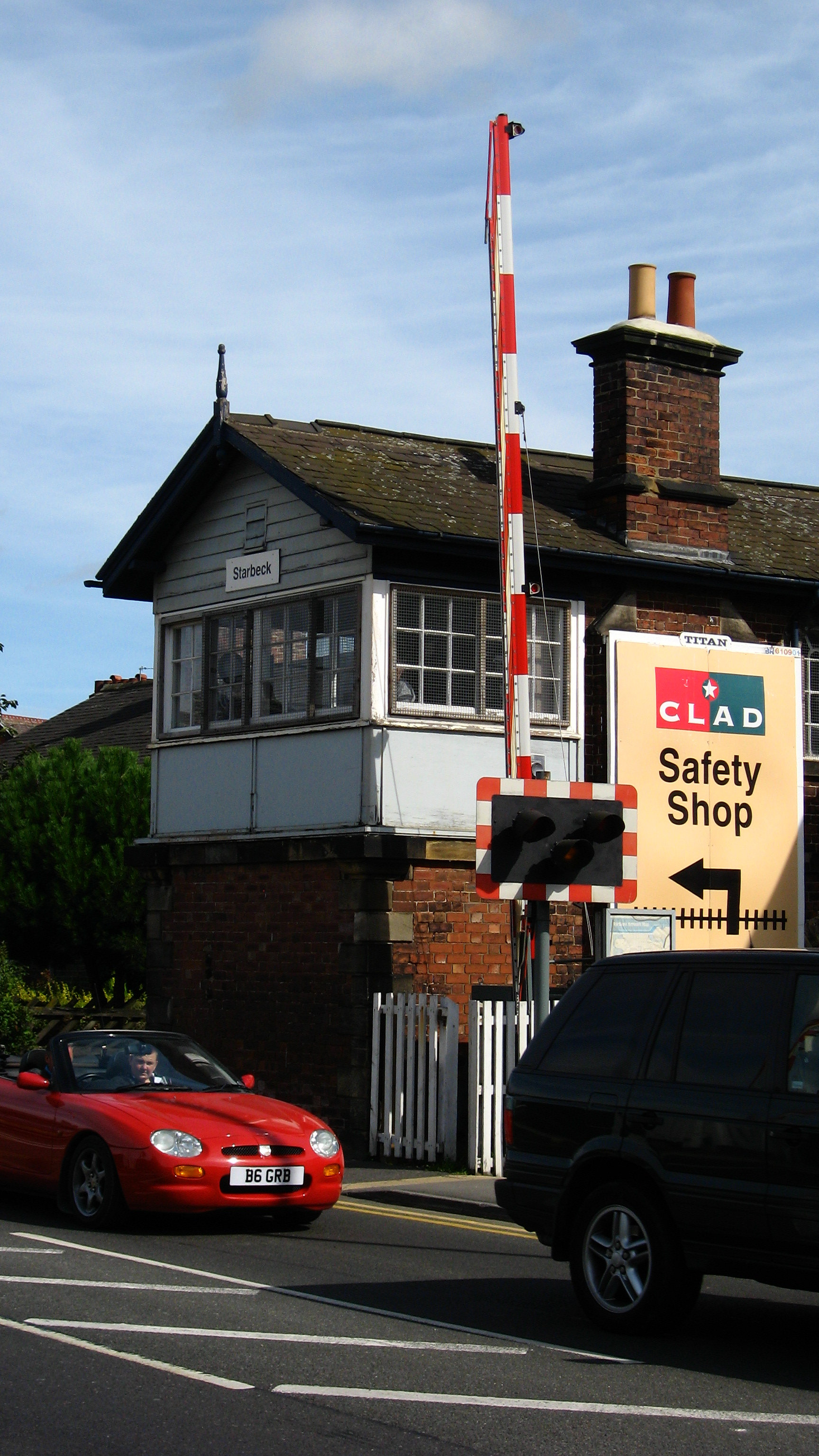
Starbeck signal box

The railway came to Starbeck in 1848. The railway buildings gradually increased, and with them came a corn mill, malt house and water bottling plant. The population expanded rapidly in this period, most families owing their livelihood in some way to the railway.

=== Decline of the railways ===
In the 1950s the decline set in. In 1951 the Nidd Valley Line closed to passengers and the loop line to Pannal (under Crimple Viaduct) closed completely. In September 1959 the engine shed and marshalling yard closed. In 1967 the passenger service to Ripon was withdrawn.

The last goods train travelled the old Leeds to Thirsk railway line from Starbeck to Northallerton on 9 October 1969, leaving only the current Harrogate Line. By 1969 the station was no longer staffed and the station buildings, goods shed and coal depot were demolished in 1978.

== Starbeck today ==
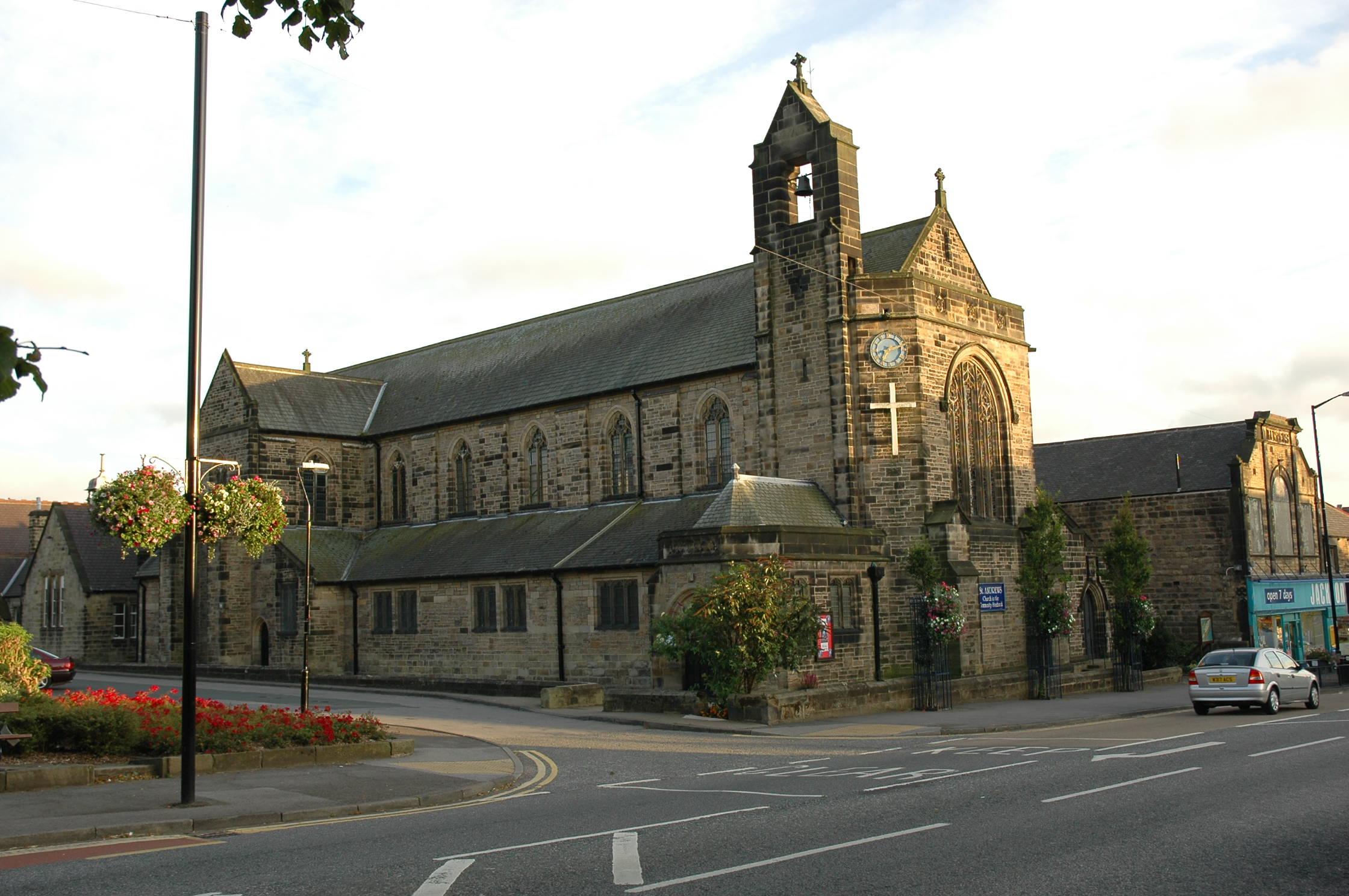
St Andrews Church, Starbeck

Starbeck, North Yorkshire, England

The High Street shops include a chemist, butchers' outlet, general stores, motorcycle shop, veterinary practice and a growing number of fast food take-aways. There is only one public house, after the British Heritage Society-listed Henry Peacock Pub, named after the master of the local workhouse, due to be demolished in 2016, was turned into a terrace of apartments with retail stores on the ground floor.

Taylors of Harrogate's Yorkshire Tea factory, Betty's Craft Bakery, a large Morrisons supermarket and a branch of Currys/PC World lie within a nearby industrial estate.

Harrogate's local bus company, The Harrogate Bus Company, also has its depot located by the railway line. The Harrogate Bus Company's parent, Transdev Blazefield, is also registered at the depot.

There are historical public baths in Spa Lane, in keeping with the spa history of the Harrogate area.

Starbeck has been a frequent winner of the Royal Horticultural Society "In Bloom" award in the Urban Community Category.

== In popular culture ==
The Forest Lane level crossing in Starbeck was used by Yorkshire Television for the filming of a scene in the Beiderbecke Affair. Starbeck also featured in a 1989 episode of Yorkshire Television's The New Statesman.

Starbuck is a toponymic surname for families from Starbeck. In the seventeenth century the progenitor of the Starbuck family in America emigrated to the New World. The Starbuck whaling family would be based in Nantucket. This family would be the inspiration for the name of Starbuck, a character in Moby-Dick, which in turn would be the origin of the name for Starbucks coffee.

== Notable residents ==
- Marc Almond (born 1957), singer and musician.
- John Turner (1800–1883), draper, landlord, moneylender and rich miser of Bradford and Starbeck, Harrogate.

== See also ==
- Listed buildings in Harrogate (Starbeck Ward)
