= Empress Hotel, Harrogate =

Hotel in Harrogate, North Yorkshire, England

Coordinates: 53°59′40″N 1°31′25″W

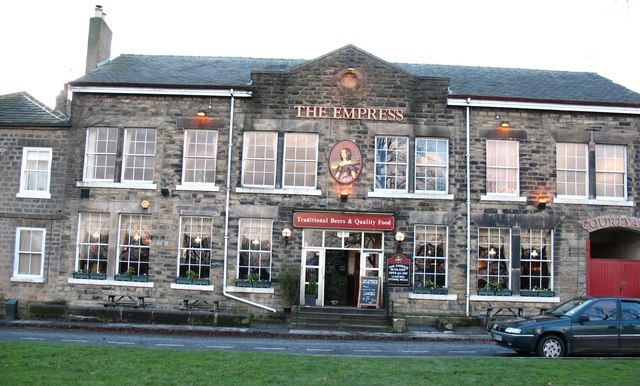
The building, in 2008

The Empress Hotel is a historic building in Harrogate, a town in North Yorkshire, in England.

The Empress Hotel was in existence by 1640, the first accommodation in the town. It was later renamed as the "Bay Horse", and although it was a single-storey building, it was large enough to host an inquest of the Royal Forest Court. It was rebuilt in about 1870 as a much larger, three-storey hotel, and returned to its original name. In 1965 the top storey was removed, and the facade was altered to the Georgian style. The building was grade II listed in 1975.

The building is constructed of rusticated gritstone and has a slate roof. It has two storeys and is ten bays wide. Over the middle four bays is a pediment containing a blind lunette. The entrance is in the centre, the windows are sashes, and on the right is a segmental-arched carriageway.

== See also ==
- Listed buildings in Harrogate (High Harrogate Ward)
