= Major Rohde Hawkins =

English architect

- Hawkins in middle age, c. 1860
- Born: 4 February 1821; Nutfield, Surrey, England
- Died: 19 October 1884 (aged 63); Holmwood, Surrey, England
- Resting place: Holmwood, Surrey, England
- Education: Thomas Cubitt; Edward Blore
- Occupation: Architect
- Employer(s): Self-employed; Privy Council
- Spouse: Mary Littledale Greenwood
- Children: –
- Parent(s): Edward Hawkins, Eliza Rohde

Major Rohde Hawkins (born 4 February 1821 in Nutfield, Surrey; died 19 October 1884, Holmwood, Surrey) was an English architect of the Victorian period. He is known for the schools and churches that he built.

== Family life ==
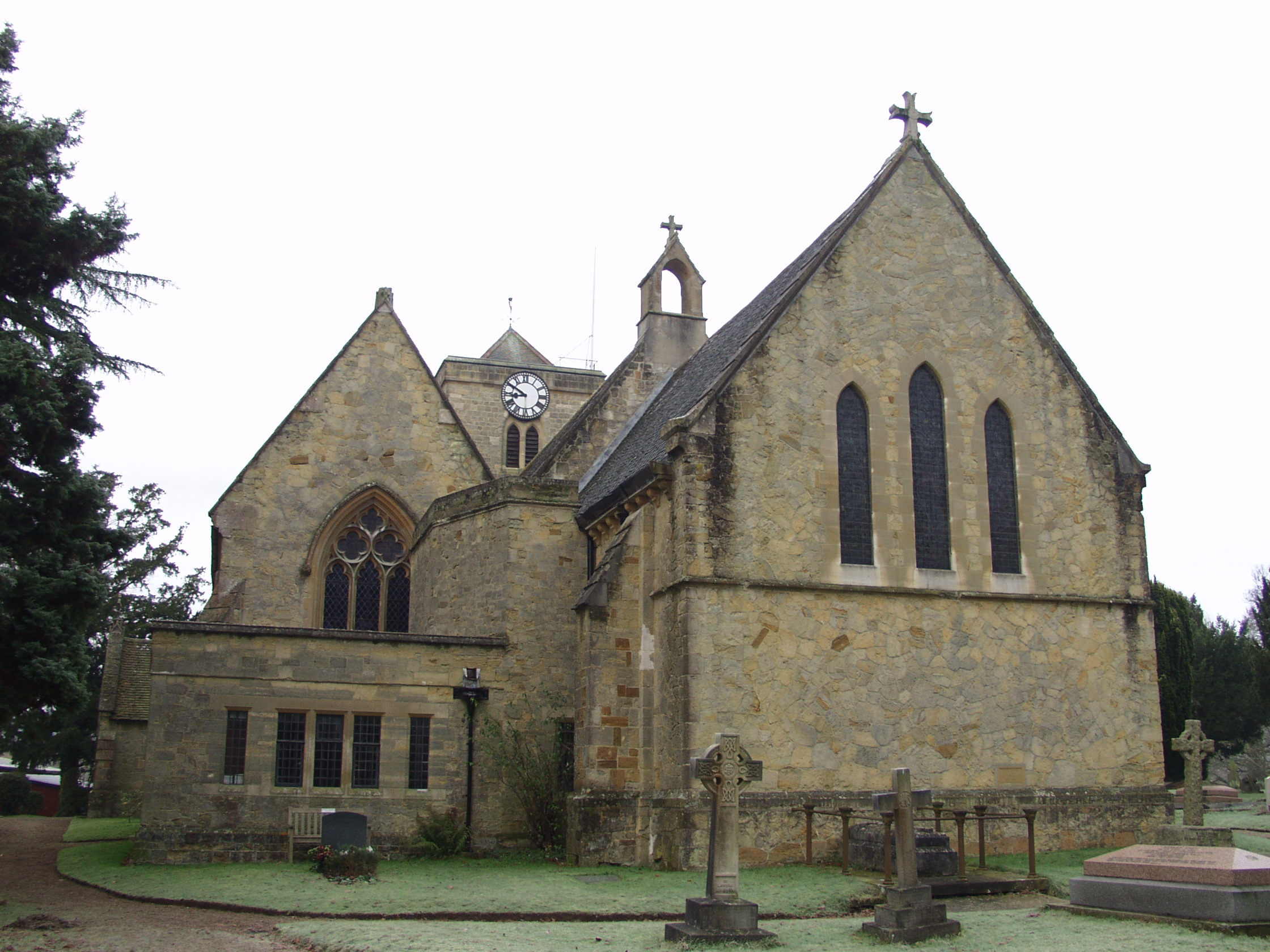
Hawkins designed South Holmwood Church, and is buried there.

Hawkins was the third son of numismatist and keeper of antiquities at the British Museum, Edward Hawkins (1780–1867) and Eliza Rohde, who had married on 29 September 1806.

Hawkins was educated at Charterhouse School from 1831 to 1837; the school was then still part of the London Charterhouse in Finsbury.

He was engaged by John Greenwood, a Yorkshire mill owner and politician at Swarcliffe, to rebuild Swarcliffe Hall in 1848. Hawkins became close enough to the Greenwood family to marry John Greenwood's granddaughter, Mary Littledale Greenwood of Holmwood, Surrey, on 4 August 1853. Mary was the younger sister of John Greenwood. John Bowyer Nichols and sons, London, 1858. A friend of the Greenwoods wrote effusively: "Mr Hawkins married our great friend John Greenwoods sister. He is one of the 1st Architects of the day. He is the Government architect for all these schools &c &c."

Hawkins and his wife Mary lived at Redlands, South Holmwood, which he designed. He and his wife are both buried at St Mary Magdalene's Church, Holmwood, which he also designed, and where there is a memorial window to him.

He was gazetted as Captain in the Queen's (Westminster) Rifle Volunteer Corps on 25 February 1860.

== Career ==
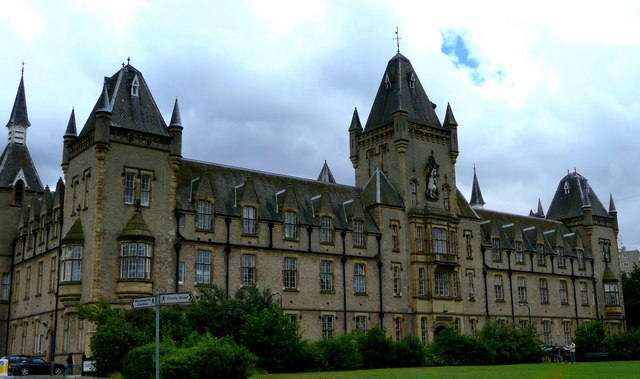
The school of the Royal Victoria Patriotic Asylum (1859) is one of Hawkins's most impressive buildings.

Hawkins studied under the wealthy London architect Thomas Cubitt, designer of Queen Victoria's Osborne House in the Isle of Wight. Hawkins then worked for the architect Edward Blore, designer of Buckingham Palace. He then explored his father's interest in antiquities, spending time studying in Asia Minor (now Turkey).

Hawkins is known today mainly for schools such as the Châteauesque Royal Victoria Patriotic Building in Wandsworth and Gothic style churches. The Builder described him as "both a skilful artist and a thorough English gentleman".

From 1854 to his death he was employed as architect to the Privy Council's Education Department, alongside his private work.

After his death, an auction of his "Objects of Art" on 9 June 1891 by Christie, Manson & Woods included ancient Chinese Cloisonné enamels, Japanese ivory carvings, bijouterie, old Persian, Venetian and French metal work, and Old Nankin, powdered blue and other enamelled Chinese porcelain.

== Buildings ==
- Swarcliffe Hall, Yorkshire (1848)
- Hunt's Hall (Guy's Hospital, London) (1853)
- Bodle Street Green, East Sussex (1853)
- St James, Lode, Cambridgeshire (1853)
- St James' Church, Birstwith (1857)
- St Paul's Church, Burdett Row, Bow, London (1858) (destroyed World War II)
- Royal Victoria Patriotic Building, Wandsworth, London (1859)
- St Michael's Church, Star Street, Paddington, London (1860–1861) (destroyed World War II)
- St Michael and All Angels Church, Mount Dinham, Exeter (1865–1868)
- St Antony's Chapel, Cowley, Devon (1867–1868)
- Fairwarp, East Sussex (1867–1871)
- St John the Evangelist's Church, Holmwood, Surrey (1874–1875)
- Redlands, South Holmwood, Surrey. c.1867

== Bibliography ==
- Green, Lionel. Church Spires and Major Rohde Hawkins. Dorking History, (2000), pages 40–41. ref
