= Listed buildings in Harrogate (Granby Ward) =

Granby is a ward in the town of Harrogate, North Yorkshire, England. It contains four listed buildings that are recorded in the National Heritage List for England. All the listed buildings are designated at Grade II, the lowest of the three grades, which is applied to "buildings of national importance and special interest". The ward is to the east of the town centre and is mainly residential. The listed buildings consist of a former hotel and houses.

== Buildings ==
Name and location	Photograph	Date	Notes
Former Granby Hotel; 53.99621°N 1.52269°W		18th century	A hotel that was later extended by the incorporation of adjacent terraces of houses, and subsequently used for other purposes. The building is rendered and has a slate roof. The central block has three storeys and five bays, the middle three bays projecting and splayed, with a floor band, a string course, a cornice and a parapet. The windows are recessed sashes with architraves and keystones, and in the middle floor is a cast iron balcony. The block is flanked by long irregular wings with three storeys and attics with dormers. To the left of the main block is a prostyle portico with paired Corinthian columns.
1 and 3 Silverfields Road; 53.99596°N 1.52127°W		Early 19th century	Four cottages, later two houses, in gritstone, with a bracketed gutter and a Welsh slate roof with coped gables. There are two storeys and eight bays. In the centre is a full-height splayed bay window with a cornice, there is one bow window, and the other windows are recessed sashes. On the front is one blocked doorway and three wooden trellis porches.
10 and 11 Granby Road; 53.99578°N 1.52096°W		Early to mid 19th century	A pair of houses in gritstone, with sill bands, a cornice and blocking course, and a hipped slate roof. There are two storeys, and each house has three bays]. The doorways are recessed, and have fanlights and console bracketed hoods, and the windows are recessed sashes in architraves.
12 Granby Road; 53.99595°N 1.52172°W		Early to mid 19th century	A house, later used for other purposes, in gritstone, with painted pilasters on quoins, a sill band, projecting bracketed eaves and a hipped slate roof. There are two storeys and three bays and a recessed single-bay extension on the right. In the centre is a doorway with pilasters and an entablature flanked by bow windows, and in the upper floor are recessed sashes.
