= Listed buildings in Harrogate (High Harrogate Ward) =

High Harrogate is a ward in the town of Harrogate, North Yorkshire, England. It contains 53 listed buildings that are recorded in the National Heritage List for England. Of these, one is listed at Grade II*, the middle of the three grades, and the others are at Grade II, the lowest grade. The area occupied by the ward is to the east of the town centre and is largely residential. Almost all the listed buildings in the ward are houses or cottages, and the others include churches, shops, hotels, two lamp posts, a former police station and a cinema.

== Key ==
Grade	Criteria
II*	Particularly important buildings of more than special interest
II	Buildings of national importance and special interest

== Buildings ==
Name and location	Photograph	Date	Notes	Grade
35 Regent Parade; 53.99797°N 1.53017°W	—	c. 1740	A hotel or lodging house, later used for other purposes and subsequently converted into a private house. It is in gritstone, the returns rendered, with flush quoins, and a stone slate roof with coped gabled and kneelers. There are three storeys and three bays, and a rear extension. In the ground floor is a central doorway with a fanlight, flanked by tripartite windows. The upper floors contain sash windows, those in the middle floor with a moulded cornice.	II
The Old Parsonage; 53.99466°N 1.52760°W	—	Mid 18th century	The house is in gritstone with quoins and a stone slate roof. There are two storeys and an attic, and three bays, the front with a coped gable and kneelers. In the centre is a doorway with a fanlight and a stone bracketed hood. It is flanked by segmental bow windows, and the other windows are sashes.	II
29 and 30 Regent Parade; 53.99790°N 1.52987°W		Late 18th century	A pair of shops in gritstone, with a slate roof, coped gables and kneelers. There are two storeys and a semi-basement, and each shop has one bay. Steps with wrought iron railings lead up to round-arched doorways in the outer parts. Between them are segmental bow windows with pilasters, an entablature, and a dentilled cornice, each containing the original 30 small panes. In the upper floor are sash windows.	II*
Mansfield House, Cottage and Mews Cottage; 53.99470°N 1.52384°W		1788	A theatre, later used as lodging houses, and subsequently divided into three dwellings, it is in gritstone, and has a stone slate roof with coped gables. There are two storeys and seven bays, the middle three bays projecting under a pediment containing a blind lunette window. In the centre is a Tuscan doorcase with a semi-elliptical head and a radial fanlight, and to the right is a doorway with a plain surround and a fanlight. The windows are recessed sashes.	II
1–3 Church Square; 53.99452°N 1.52488°W		Early 19th century	A terrace of three houses in gritstone, with sill bands, an eaves cornice, and a stone slate roof with a coped gable. There are two storeys and seven bays. In the ground floor are three round-arched doorways with patterned radial fanlights, and the windows are recessed sashes with plain surrounds. In front of the houses are cast iron railings with urn finials.	II
7 Church Square; 53.99481°N 1.52406°W	—	Early 19th century	The house is in gritstone with a stone slate roof. There are two storeys and three bays. The central doorway has a patterned radial fanlight, and above it is a blind window. The other windows are recessed sashes.	II
11 and 12 Church Square; 53.99444°N 1.52352°W		Early 19th century	A pair of houses in gritstone with a floor band and a hipped slate roof. There are two storeys and basements, and five bays. On the front are two doorways approached by steps, with architraves, fanlights and pediments. In the outer bays are segmental bow window with cornices, the other windows are sashes, there is one blind window, and two dormers.	II
15 to 20 Church Square; 53.99407°N 1.52452°W		Early 19th century	A terrace of six houses on a corner site with an L-shaped plan. They are in gritstone, No. 20 is pebbledashed, and they have a hipped stone slate roof. There are two storeys and basements, and each house has one or two bays. Most of the windows are sashes, Nos. 15 and 20 have bay windows, and the entrances have been altered.	II
21 and 22 Church Square; 53.99427°N 1.52471°W	—	Early 19th century	A pair of cottages in red brick, the front in gritstone, with a slate roof and coped gables. There are two storeys and three bays. In the centre is a segmental-arched carriageway containing the entrances. To its left is a bow window, and the other windows are recessed sashes.	II
29 to 31 Devonshire Place; 53.99709°N 1.52722°W	—	Early 19th century	A row of three stuccoed cottages with stone slate roofs and a coped gable and kneeler on the right. They have two or three storeys and sash windows, and one, two and three bays. The doorways have altered canopies.	II
11 and 12 Park Parade; 53.99377°N 1.52824°W		Early 19th century	A pair of houses in gritstone, with eaves and gutters on wrought iron brackets, and a stone slate roof. There are two storeys and a basement, and five bays. Steps with wrought iron railings in the outer bays lead up to cast iron porches and recessed doorways with panelled reveals and fanlights, and above are recessed sash windows. The adjacent bays contain full-height splayed bay windows, and in the middle bay is a cast iron balcony between the floors. The basement area is enclosed by wrought iron railings.	II
13 Park Parade; 53.99387°N 1.52816°W		Early 19th century	The house is in gritstone, and has a slate roof with coped gables. There are thee storeys and four bays. In the left bay is a segmental-arched carriage entrance. The second and fourth bays contain two-storey splayed bay windows with cornices, between them is a doorway with a panelled surround and a fanlight, and above it is a cast iron balcony. Elsewhere, there are recessed sash windows.	II
16 and 17 Park Parade; 53.99403°N 1.52801°W	—	Early 19th century	A pair of stuccoed houses with a Welsh slate roof, three storeys and basements. In the outer part of each house is a doorway with a fanlight approached by steps, and in the centre are two-storey splayed bay windows, with segmental-arched lights and cornices. In the top floor are sash windows, and the basement area is enclosed by cast iron railings with urn finials.	II
18 and 19 Park Parade; 53.99415°N 1.52793°W		Early 19th century	A pair of houses in gritstone, the ground floor rusticated, with slate roof. There are three storeys and basements, and each house has two bays. In the left bay of each house is a round-arched doorway with a fanlight, approached by steps with wrought iron railings, and to the right is a segmental bow window. The upper floors contain recessed sash windows, and in the middle floor is a continuous cast iron balcony. The basement area is enclosed by cast iron railings with urn finials.	II
20 Park Parade; 53.99424°N 1.52786°W		Early 19th century	A chapel, later a private house, it is stuccoed, the ground floor is rusticated, and there are floor and sill bands, a coped parapet and a slate roof. The house has three storeys and three bays. In the left bay of the ground floor is a segmental carriage entrance converted into a window, and in the right bay is a doorway with a fanlight. Elsewhere, there are recessed sash windows, those in the two upper floors each with a cast iron balcony.	II
22 Park Parade; 53.99456°N 1.52765°W	—	Early 19th century	The house is in gritstone, and has a pediment and a slate roof. There are two storeys and an attic, and two bays. On the right is a round-arched doorway with a fanlight, and to its left is a bracketed carriage lamp. The windows are sashes, and in the attic is a window with a semi-elliptical head. In front of the house are wrought iron railings.	II
27 and 28 Park Parade; 53.99502°N 1.52759°W	—	Early 19th century	A pair of houses in gritstone, with a cornice, and a slate roof with a coped gable. There are three storeys and four bays. In the right bay is an elliptical-arched carriage entrance. In the second bay is a recessed doorway with a fanlight, and the windows are recessed and a mix of sashes and casements. Over the ground floor openings is a continuous hood mould.	II
32 and 33 Park Parade; 53.99553°N 1.52767°W	—	Early 19th century	A pair of houses in stuccoed gritstone, with bracketed gutters, and a Welsh slate roof with coped gables, and a kneeler on the right. There are two storeys and the right house projects slightly. Both houses have a doorway with a fanlight. The left house has two bays, a bow window in each floor, the ground floor window larger, a recessed sash window in the upper floor of the right bay, and a gabled dormer. In the right house is a two-storey bow window.	II
1 Regent Parade; 53.99599°N 1.52797°W		Early 19th century	The house is in gritstone, with sill bands, bracketed eaves, and a hipped slate roof. There are three storeys and three bays, and a slightly recessed bay on the left. In the centre of the main block is a round-arched doorway with Tuscan half-columns, a fanlight and an open pediment. The windows are recessed sashes, the lintels marked out as voussoirs, and the window above the doorway has a cast iron balconette.	II
2, 2A and 3 Regent Parade; 53.99618°N 1.52817°W	—	Early 19th century	A pair of houses in gritstone with a slate roof. There are three storeys and each house has one bay. In the centre are paired doorways, with hoods on console brackets. Outside these are two-storey bow windows, and in the top floor are sash windows.	II
12 and 13 Regent Parade; 53.99677°N 1.52874°W	—	Early 19th century	A pair of stuccoed houses with a floor band and a slate roof. There are two storeys and each house has two bays. In the right bay of each house is a doorway with a divided fanlight, and the windows are recessed sashes. The ground floor openings have curved channelled lintels with keystones.	II
15 Regent Parade; 53.99688°N 1.52885°W	—	Early 19th century	A pair of shops and a house in gritstone, with floor bands, an eaves cornice, and a slate roof with coped gables and modified kneelers. There are three storeys and four bays. In the ground floor are two shopfronts with a cornice, the windows with arched lights, and central doorways. Between the shopfronts is a house doorway with panelled pilasters and a fanlight. The upper floors contain recessed sash windows, those in the middle floor with cast iron balconies, and in the roof are gabled dormers.	II
17 to 19 Regent Parade; 53.99708°N 1.52903°W	—	Early 19th century	Nos. 17 and 18 form a pair of houses, formerly shops, in gritstone with sill bands and a slate roof. There are three storeys and three bays. In the centre are paired doorways with round-arched heads, imposts, radial fanlights, keystones, and doors with cast iron lion's head knockers. To the right, No. 19 is a taller shop with a painted front, projecting eaves, and a hipped slate roof, three storeys and three bays. In the ground floor is a shopfront with pilasters and an entablature, and its windows with semi-elliptical-headed lights. In both parts, the windows are recessed sashes.	II
Park House; 53.99445°N 1.52776°W	—	Early 19th century	The house is in stone, with a sill band, a bracketed gutter, and a slate roof with coped gables and kneelers. There are three storeys and three bays, a two-storey bay on the right extending to form a rear wing, and another rear wing on the left. On the east front is a Doric prostyle portico flanked by bow windows. In the upper floor are sash windows with architraves and cornices. The south front is gabled and has three storeys and an attic and three bays, and in the left bay is a semicircular bay window.	II
Spirit Safe, County Hotel; 53.99722°N 1.52697°W	—	Early 19th century	The building is in stone on a plinth, with a hipped slate roof and a single storey. On the north front are two sash windows, and to the right is a window converted into a doorway.	II
Former County Hotel; 53.99710°N 1.52697°W		c. 1830	The rebuilding of a hotel built in the early 18th century, incorporating an adjoining house. It is in gritstone, and consists of two blocks. The left block has two storeys and five bays, a floor band and a slate roof. The right block has three storeys and an attic and four bays, a pedimented gable, and a tile roof. The doorway has a fanlight, the windows in both parts are sashes and in the tympanum of the pediment is a round-arched window with imposts and a keystone.	II
Christ Church; 53.99389°N 1.52578°W		1830–31	The church was designed by John Oates, and the transepts and chancel were added in 1861–62 by Lockwood and Mawson. It is built in sandstone with a slate roof, and has a cruciform plan consisting of a nave, north and south transepts, a chancel, a north organ chamber, a south vestry, and a west tower flanked by porches. The tower has four stages, angle buttresses, a clock face, bell openings with pointed head, and an embattled parapet.	II
28 Devonshire Place; 53.99713°N 1.52742°W		Early to mid 19th century	The house is in gritstone, with a bracketed gutter, and a slate roof with coped gables. There are three storeys and two bays. The doorway is recessed and has a fanlight, and the windows are recessed sashes. Over the ground floor is a tented bracketed canopy.	II
30 Park Parade; 53.99519°N 1.52766°W	—	Early to mid 19th century	The house is in gritstone with bracketed eaves and a slate roof. There are two storeys and three bays. In the ground floor are pilasters and an entablature, a doorway with a fanlight, and to the right is a blocked doorway. The windows are recessed sashes.	II
5, 6 and 7 Regent Parade; 53.99634°N 1.52836°W	—	Early to mid 19th century	A terrace of three houses in gritstone, with a slate roof, and three storeys. Most of the windows are sash windows, and the doorways have fanlights. The left house has three bays, a floor band, and in the middle bay of the middle floor is a splayed bay window. The middle house has two bays, and in the left bay of the middle floor is a bow window. The right house has three bays, a former ground floor shop window with modified pilasters, an entablature, and a doorway with panelled reveals. The outer bays of the middle floor contain splayed bay windows.	II
13A Regent Parade, railings and workshop 53.99662°N 1.52899°W	—	Early to mid 19th century	The house and workshops are in red brick, with a grey slate roof and stone ridge tiles. The house has two storeys and a basement, and three bays. Steps lead up to a central doorway with a traceried fanlight, and the windows are sashes in architraves; all the openings have wedge lintels. The workshops have two storeys and nine bays, and contain sash windows, some horizontally-sliding. The railings enclosing the basement area have spiked bars and finials, and associated with them are two boot scrapers.	II
Library House; 53.99610°N 1.52808°W	—	Early to mid 19th century	The house is in gritstone with bracketed eaves and a hipped slate roof. There are three storeys and two bays. In the ground floor are pilasters and an entablature with projecting cornices, and inserted splayed bay windows flanking a doorway with a fanlight. In the middle floor are splayed bay windows with dentilled cornices, and the top floor contains segmental-arched paired sash windows.	II
1 and 2 Park Parade and 50 North Park Road; 53.99224°N 1.52876°W	—	Mid 19th century	A terrace of three houses in gritstone, with an eaves cornice, and a hipped slate roof. There are two storeys, a basement and attics, and six bays. The middle two bays are recessed, and each bay contains a doorway approached by steps, with pilasters, a fanlight and an entablature. Above them are balustraded balconies, and windows with segmental-arched heads. The windows are sashes in architraves. In the outer bays there are splayed bay windows, and the windows in the upper floor have cornices. In the roof are three gabled dormers.	II
8 Park Parade; 53.99346°N 1.52849°W	—	Mid 19th century	The house is in gritstone, with sill bands, projecting eaves, and a hipped slate roof. There are three storeys and three bays. In the centre is a Roman Doric doorcase with triglyphs in the frieze, and a semi-elliptical doorway with a radial fanlight. The outer bays contain two-storey bay windows with cornices, and the other windows are recessed sashes.	II
31 Park Parade; 53.99536°N 1.52773°W		Mid 19th century	The building, known as Bilton House, is in gritstone, and has a cornice and blocking course, and a hipped slate roof. There are two storeys and an attic, and seven bays, the outer bays recessed. In the centre is a prostyle portico in painted stucco. The windows are recessed sashes, and in the roof are dormers.	II
10, 10A, 11 and 11A Regent Parade; 53.99665°N 1.52865°W	—	Mid 19th century	A pair of shops in gritstone, with sill bands, a bracketed gutter, and a slate roof with coped gables and kneelers. There are three storeys, and each shop has three bays. In the ground floor are shopfronts with pilasters and entablatures, the shop windows with arched lights, and house doorways with fanlights. The middle floor of each shop has a splayed bay window with a cornice on the outer bays. The other windows are recessed sashes, and the right shop has three gabled dormers.	II
29 and 29A York Place; 53.98952°N 1.53355°W	—	Mid 19th century	The house is in gritstone, with projecting eaves, and a hipped slate roof. There are two storeys and three bays. In the centre is an Ionic prostyle portico, and a doorway with a fanlight. This is flanked by splayed bay windows with pilaster mullions and an entablature, and the other windows are sashes in architraves.	II
Cedar Court Hotel; 53.99158°N 1.52964°W		c. 1855	The hotel, built on the site of the original Queen Hotel, and subsequently enlarged, is in gritstone with a bracketed cornice and a balustraded parapet. There are three storeys, in the centre are three pedimented bays that are flanked by long wings, ending on the left with the former manager's house, and on the right with a later ballroom. In the centre is a splayed portico with Tuscan columns in antis, with an entablature and a bracketed cornice. The windows are segmental-arched sashes, and at intervals there are full-height splayed bay windows.	II
The Empress Hotel; 53.99454°N 1.52362°W		c. 1870	The rebuilding of an 18th-century hotel, it was further altered in 1965, including the removal of a storey. It is in rusticated gritstone and has a slate roof. There are two storeys and ten bays, and over the middle four bays is a pediment containing a blind lunette. The entrance is in the centre, the windows are sashes, and on the right is a segmental-arched carriageway.	II
24–26 Park Parade; 53.99483°N 1.52761°W		Mid to late 19th century	A row of three shops, later used for other purposes, in rusticated gritstone, with sill and floor bands, a bracketed eaves cornice, and a slate mansard roof. There are three storeys and attics, five bays, and a splayed left corner. The main doorway has a trefoil arch, and there is a doorway with a simpler surround to the right. In the ground floor are four segmental-arched windows with engaged columns between them. The upper floors contain mullioned and transomed windows, to the right in the middle floor is an oriel window, and in the attic are seven hipped dormers. The middle floor has a cast iron balcony.	II
29 Park Parade; 53.99511°N 1.52764°W		Mid to late 19th century	A shop in rusticated gritstone with a slate roof. There are three storeys and an attic, and one bay. The coped gable end faces the street. In the ground floor is a shopfront with paired pilasters, an entablature and a bracketed cornice, and in the middle floor is a splayed bay window with a bracketed cornice. The top floor contains two recessed sash windows, and in the attic is a lunette window with a hood mould.	II
9 Park Parade; 53.99358°N 1.52840°W	—	Late 19th century	The house is in gritstone, with sill bands, bracketed eaves on modified consoles, and a slate roof. There are two storeys, a basement and attics, and three bays. In the centre is a cast iron porch approached by steps with cast iron railings, above which is a recessed sash window. The outer bays contain two-storey splayed bay windows with pilaster mullions and a cornice, and in the attic are pedimented dormers.	II
10 Park Parade; 53.99367°N 1.52830°W		Late 19th century	The house is in painted gritstone, with block quoins, a bracketed eaves cornice on consoles, and a hipped slate roof. There are three storeys and a basement, and three bays. Steps lead up to the central doorway that has an architrave, a fanlight, a pulvinated frieze and a hood on consoles. The ground floor is rusticated with vermiculated bands, and contains three windows in each outer bay, above which is a dentilled cornice. The middle floor contains seven windows with pilasters and arched heads with fans in the tympani, and below is a balustraded balcony. Above is a string course and seven recessed sash windows.	II
15 Park Parade; 53.99396°N 1.52807°W	—	Late 19th century	The house is in gritstone with a slate roof and two bays. The right bay has three storeys and a gable, and contains three-light recessed sash windows. The left bay has two storeys and an attic, and contains a doorway with a semi-elliptical arch and a bracketed slate hood, above which is a two-light window and a dormer.	II
11, 13 and 13A Queen Parade; 53.99159°N 1.53148°W		Late 19th century	Two houses in gritstone, with rusticated quoins, bracketed eaves, and hipped slate roofs. They have two storeys and three bays. Each house has an elaborate cast iron verandah along the front with a glazed roof, two splayed bay windows flanking the entrance, and recessed sash windows. No. 11 has a wooden portico, and the other house has a central doorway with pilasters, a fanlight and an entablature.	II
9 Regent Parade; 53.99651°N 1.52853°W	—	Late 19th century	A house in gritstone, with rusticated quoins, a cornice, bracketed segmental pediments over the outer bays and a slate roof. There are three storeys and three bays. In the centre of the ground floor is a doorway with a fanlight, flanked by tripartite windows, under a bracketed cornice. The middle floor contains splayed bay windows in the outer bays, with arched lights and bracketed cornices, and between them is a round-arched window. In the top floor are sash windows in architraves with bracketed sills.	II
Harrogate Baptist Church; 53.99160°N 1.53542°W		1882–83	The church, designed by William Peachey, is in rusticated sandstone with a Welsh slate roof, and a pierced quatrefoil parapet. It consists of a nave, north and south transepts, a steeple at the southwest corner, and a meeting room at the north. On the roof is an octagonal lead flèche. The steeple has a three-stage tower with an octagonal belfry and spire, and at the south end is a four-light rose window.	II
Former St Luke's Church; 54.00008°N 1.53890°W		1895–97	The steeple was added to the church in 1902, and in 1983 it was converted into dwellings. It is in gritstone with a slate roof, and is in Decorated style. The church consists of a nave with a clerestory, north and south aisles, a southwest porch, north and south transepts, a chancel, and a west steeple. The east window has five lights.	II
Former Grove Road Methodist Church; 54.00065°N 1.53581°W		1896	A Sunday school was added to the church in1929 in similar style. The buildings are in rusticated sandstone with Welsh slate roofs. The entrance front of the church has two storeys and four bays, the middle two bays are flanked by pilasters and have a pediment with a moulded finial. This is flanked by parapets with urns on the corners, and under the pediment is a lettered and dated frieze. At the entrance is a projecting two-bay portico with round arches on granite columns with Corinthian capitals and foliage decoration in the spandrels, and above is a balustraded parapet with three urns.	II
Lamp post, Park Parade; 53.99104°N 1.52915°W	—	1899 (or later)	The lamp post at the south end of Park Parade is in cast iron, with a cylindrical base containing a door with a coat of arms. Above this is a series of bands and a circular column carrying a square block with ball-ended ladder supports. At the top are scrolled lamp supports.	II
Lamp post, Regent Parade; 53.99706°N 1.52870°W	—	1899 (or later)	The lamp post in Regent Parade is in cast iron, with a cylindrical base containing a door with a coat of arms. Above this is a series of bands and a circular column carrying a square block with ball-ended ladder supports. At the top are scrolled lamp supports.	II
Former Police Station; 53.99264°N 1.53242°W		c. 1930	The police station, later used for other purposes, is in red brick and red sandstone, with tile roofs. It consists of a main block with two storeys and 13 bays, and a taller block to the rear. The forecourt is flanked by two police houses, and elsewhere are three more police houses. The area is enclosed by a low brick wall with ornamental railings, including entrances with ornamental gates.	II
Odeon Cinema; 53.99251°N 1.53556°W		1936	The cinema, designed by Harry Weedon, is in brown brick and faience. There are two notational storeys and an attic, a front of six bays, the left bay recessed, a tower to the right and a rounded corner. The entrance is in the corner and above it is the word "ODEON" in illuminated letters, and a parapet with a green band. The tower is in brick with a faience fin, and the word "CINEMA" at the top. To the left are tall strip windows, above which are rectangular windows, a parapet and slit windows.	II
