= Listed buildings in Harrogate (Rossett Ward) =

Rossett is a ward in the town of Harrogate, North Yorkshire, England. It contains two listed buildings that are recorded in the National Heritage List for England. Both the listed buildings are designated at Grade II, the lowest of the three grades, which is applied to "buildings of national importance and special interest". The ward is to the south of the town, and is residential. The listed buildings consist of a house, and structures at the entrance to a churchyard.

== Buildings ==
Name and location	Photograph	Date	Notes
Springfield House; 53.97403°N 1.55013°W	—	Early to mid 19th century	The house is in sandstone on a plinth, with rusticated quoins, an eaves band, and a hipped Welsh slate roof. There are two storeys and an attic, and three bays, and a lower two-storey extension to the left. Steps lead up to a doorway with a fanlight, in a porch with pilasters, an entablature and a blocking course. The windows are sashes, those in the ground floor with shouldered architraves and aprons, and in the upper floor with architraves and moulded sills.
Gate and railings, All Saints' Church; 53.98035°N 1.56471°W		c. 1870	Flanking the entrance to the churchyard are gabled stone gate piers. The gates are in cast iron, and outside these are low walls with cast iron railings.
