= St James' Church, Birstwith =

Church in Birstwith, North Yorkshire, England

Coordinates: 54°01′51″N 1°38′12″W

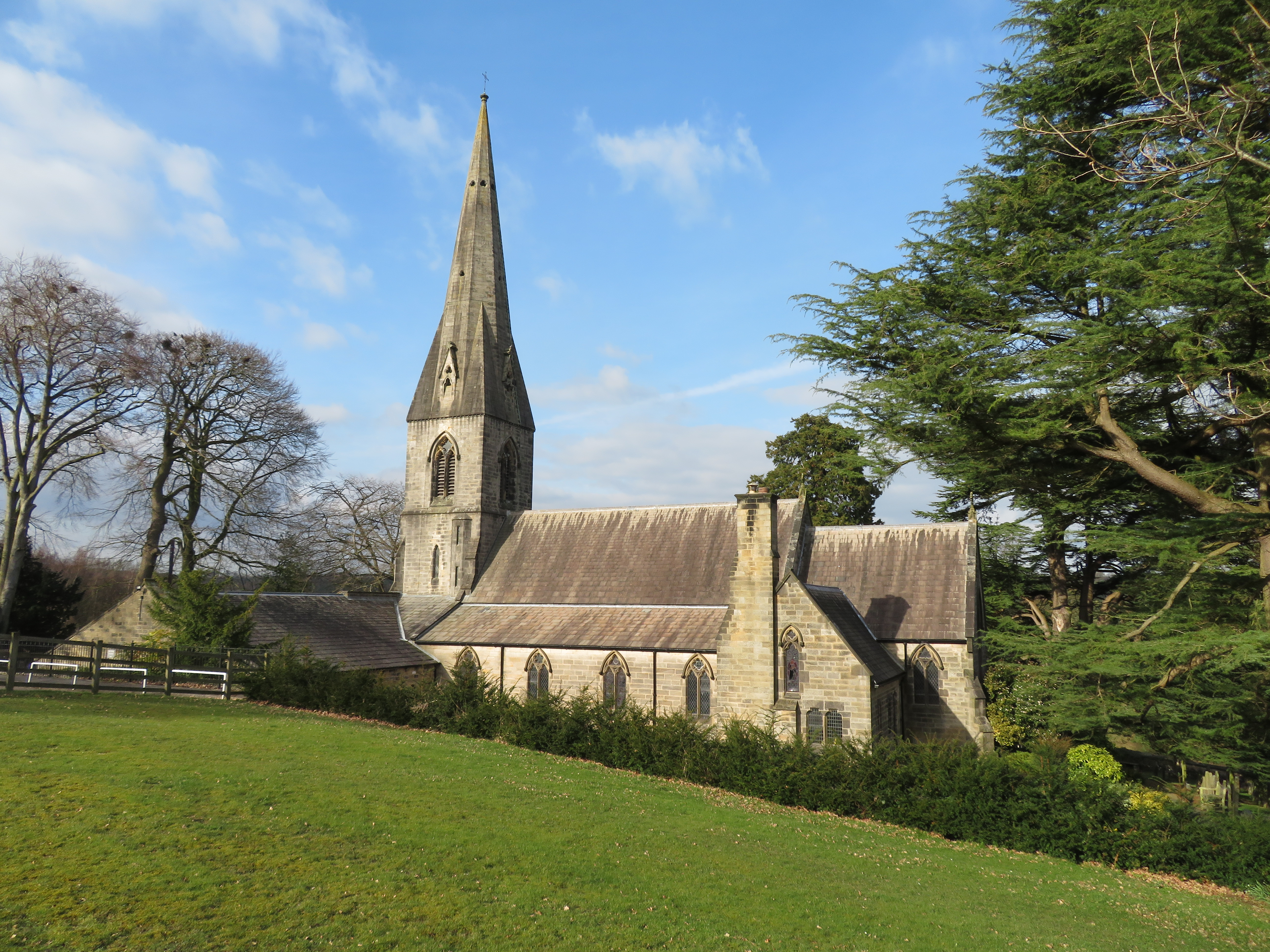
The church, in 2021

St James' Church is the parish church of Birstwith, a village in North Yorkshire in England.

The church was commissioned by John Frederick Greenwood, a local mill owner. It was designed by Rohde Hawkins and built between 1856 and 1857, in a late 13th-/early 14th-century Gothic style. A vestry and organ chamber were added in 1887. The church was Grade II listed in 1987.

The church is built in gritstone with grey slate roofs. It consists of a nave, north and south aisles, a north porch, a chancel, a vestry and organ chamber, and a west steeple. The 100 foot steeple has a tower with three stages, diagonal buttresses, a band, bell openings with pointed arches and hood moulds, and a broach spire with one tier of lucarnes. Inside, there are pews probably dating from 1887, a chancel arch with carvings of grapes and wheat, and a reredos with figures in alabaster and glass mosaic. The organ was made by Binns, and the National Churches Trust states that the church has "some splendid stained glass".

== See also ==
- Listed buildings in Birstwith
