= Cedar Court Hotel =

Historic building in Harrogate, England

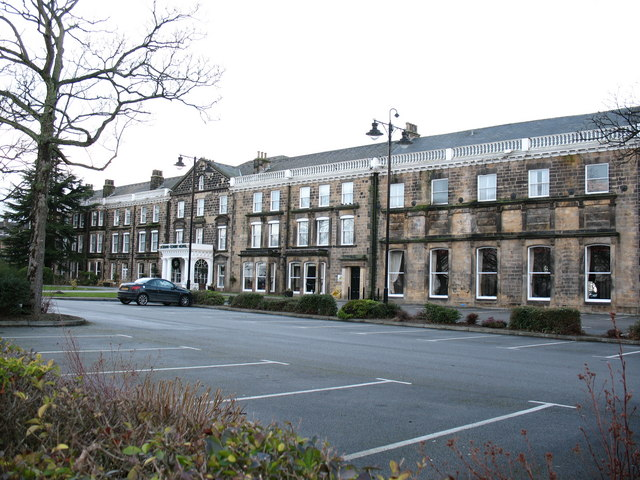
- The hotel, in 2008
- Interactive map of Cedar Court Hotel

General information
- Location: Harrogate, North Yorkshire, England
- Coordinates: 53.9982°N 1.5286°W
- Opened: 17th century

The Cedar Court Hotel is a historic building in Harrogate, a town in North Yorkshire, in England.

== History ==
The chalybeate spring in Harrogate was discovered in 1631, and provided with a well-head building in 1656. It attracted increasing numbers of visitors, but most had to stay in Knaresborough, as Harrogate only had ten beds available. This shortage led to the construction of several inns, the first of which was the Queen's Head, which opened in 1687. It later became known as the "Queen Hotel". The central section of the building was rebuilt in 1855, and a western wing was added, while the eastern wing was renovated in 1861. The hotel was requisitioned during World War II as accommodation for pilots, then in 1950 it became the headquarters of the regional health authority. In 1990, it was converted back into a hotel, the flagship of the small Cedar Court Hotels group. The building was grade II listed in 1975.

The hotel is built of gritstone with a bracketed cornice and a balustraded parapet. There are three storeys, in the centre are three pedimented bays that are flanked by long wings, ending on the left with the former manager's house, and on the right with a later ballroom. In the centre is a splayed portico with Tuscan columns in antis, with an entablature and a bracketed cornice. The windows are segmental-arched sashes, and at intervals there are full-height splayed bay windows.

== See also ==
- Listed buildings in Harrogate (High Harrogate Ward)
