= Christ Church, High Harrogate =

Parish church in Harrogate, North Yorkshire, England

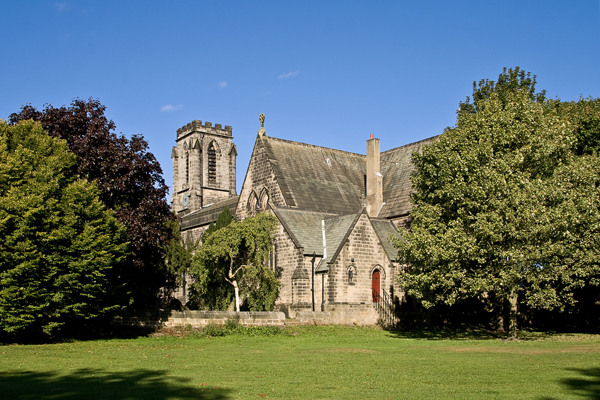
- Christ Church, High Harrogate

- 53°59′38″N 01°31′31″W
- OS grid reference: SE 31193 55415
- Denomination: Church of England
- Churchmanship: Central churchmanship
- Website: www.christchurchharrogate.org.uk

History
- Dedication: Christ Church

Architecture
- Heritage designation: Grade II listed

Administration
- Province: York
- Diocese: Leeds
- Archdeaconry: Richmond and Craven
- Deanery: Harrogate
- Parish: Christ Church High Harrogate

Clergy
- Vicar: The Revd Matthew Evans

Christ Church, High Harrogate is a parish church in the Church of England located in Harrogate, North Yorkshire, England. It was the first church building to be built in Harrogate and is today home to a thriving congregation and – along with the attached Parish Centre – an important focus of community activities.

== History ==
Christ Church, High Harrogate was the first permanent church building in Harrogate, as Harrogate did not previously have a church of its own. Originally a chapel of ease to St John's, Knaresborough, the bulk of the present building was erected in 1831 to designs by the architect John Oates and consecrated as the first parish church in the town. The transepts and chancel were added in 1862 by Henry Francis Lockwood and William Mawson. The carving on the extensions and a previous reredos were executed by Mawer and Ingle in 1862. There have been significant changes to the building in the 1920s (many major internal changes), the 1930s (the installation of the Comper reredos) and the 1980s (the building of the attached parish centre.).

Christ Church has in turn planted a series of other churches across the town including St. Peter's (1870), St Luke's (1898), and St Andrew's Starbeck (1911). Like Christ Church itself, all of these are thriving Christian communities today.

=== Present day ===
Christ Church is home to a thriving Christian community of 300+ adults and 170+ children and young people. It stands in the mainstream of the Anglican (Church of England) tradition.

== List of Vicars ==
Perpetual curates (1755–1831):

- 1755 – 1759 William Leigh Williamson
- 1759 – 1765 Nevile Stow
- 1765 – 1769 John Hinde
- 1769 – 1825 Robert Mitton
- 1825 John Lloyd Lugger
- 1825 – 1831 Thomas Kennion (and see Vicars below)

Vicars (1831–present):

- 1831 – 1845 Thomas Kennion
- 1845 – 1858 Thomas Sheepshanks
- 1858 – 1870 Horatio James (Canon of Ripon)
- 1870 – 1887 William Winter Gibbon (Canon of Ripon)
- 1887 – 1903 Richard Wentworth Fawkes
- 1904 – 1926 Douglas Sherwood Guy (Canon of Ripon)
- 1927 – 1935 Paul Fulchrand Delacour de Labilliere (subsequently Bishop of Knaresborough and Dean of Westminster)
- 1935 – 1937 Claude Cyprian Thornton (Canon of Ripon)
- 1937 – 1943 Martin Kiddle
- 1943 – 1954 William Frederick Vernon
- 1954 – 1970 Thomas Arthur Bendelow
- 1970 – 1994 Richard Thomas Wright McDermid (Chaplain to HM the Queen, Canon of Ripon)
- 1995 – 2007 John Edward Colston (Canon of Ripon)
- 2008 – 2014 Nicholas James Henshall
- 2015 – Matthew Scott Evans (22 January 2015 – present)

This list is taken directly from the board at the west end of the church and all spellings are as on the board.

== Organ ==
In 1908 a new organ by Norman & Beard was installed. It was rebuilt by John T. Jackson in 1980 with a new detached console. A specification of the organ can be found on the National Pipe Organ Register.

=== Organist and Director of Music ===
- Mr. Pilkington ca. 1863
- Matthew Arnold ca. 1867
- John Septimus Dickinson ???? – 1870 (afterwards organist of St. Peter's Church, Harrogate)
- W.P. Bell ca. 1880
- Mr. Wade ca. 1892
- J.F. Chubb 1910 – ????
- Ernest Farrar ARCO 1912 – 1916
- Warner Yeomans ca. 1920
- Douglas Robinson 1946 – 1974?
- Ralph Franklin FTCL FGSM ca. 1980s
- Derek Bolton 1980's
- Dr John Beilby BMus PhD FLCM LRAM LTCL 2005 – 2008
- Jonathan Eyre BMus (Hons) ARCO ATCL 2008 – 2009
- Christine Alp GRSM LRAM LGSM 2009–2024
- David Darling 2024-present

== See also ==
- Listed buildings in Harrogate (High Harrogate Ward)
