= Empress Hotel (Toronto) =

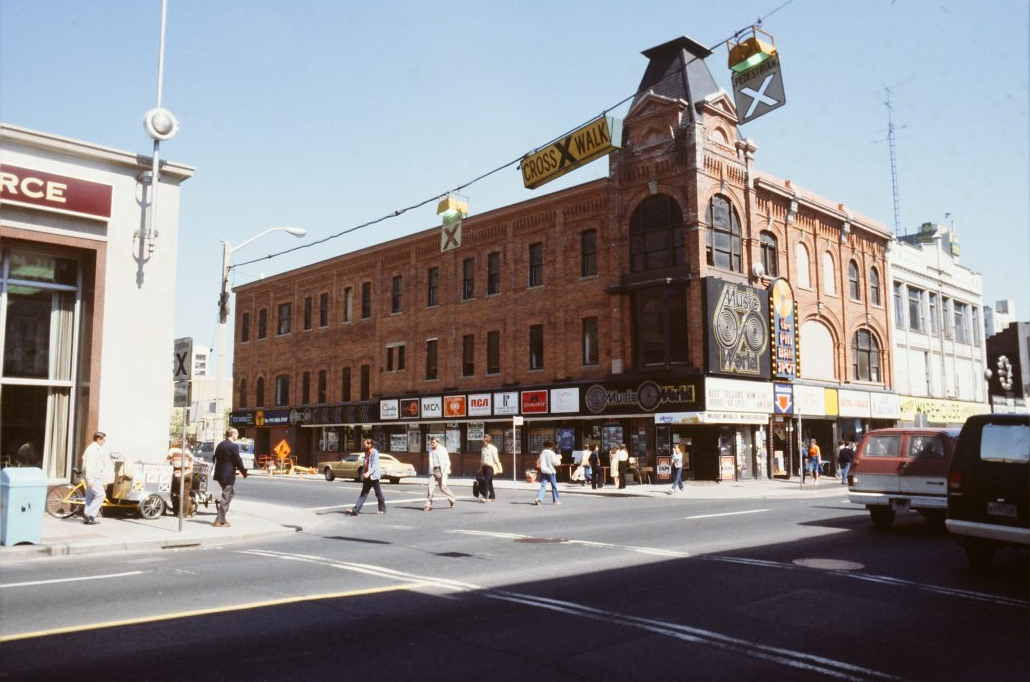
- 335 Yonge Street in 1979
- Interactive map of the Empress Hotel area
- Former names: Edison Hotel

General information
- Status: Demolished
- Location: 335 Yonge Street, Toronto, Ontario, Canada
- Coordinates: 43.6574°N 79.3810°W
- Opened: 1888
- Demolished: 2011

The Empress Hotel was a three-storey red-brick building at the corner of Yonge and Gould streets in downtown Toronto. It was destroyed by fire on January 3, 2011. The hotel was opened in 1888. The hotel changed hands several times. The property ceased operating as a hotel in the mid-1970s.

== History ==
335 Yonge Street housed hotels from 1888, under different owners, to sometime in the 1970s. In the 1960s, it was known as the Edison Hotel and was a major live music venue in Yonge Street's booming Rock n' Roll culture. After the building stopped functioning as a hotel portions were leased by a number of businesses. In 2010, after the property was bought by the Lalani Group, the owners started to demolish the building, only to be stopped when the Toronto city council designated it a protected heritage property on July 16, 2010.

Part of the building's facade collapsed in April, 2010.

=== Arson and demolition ===
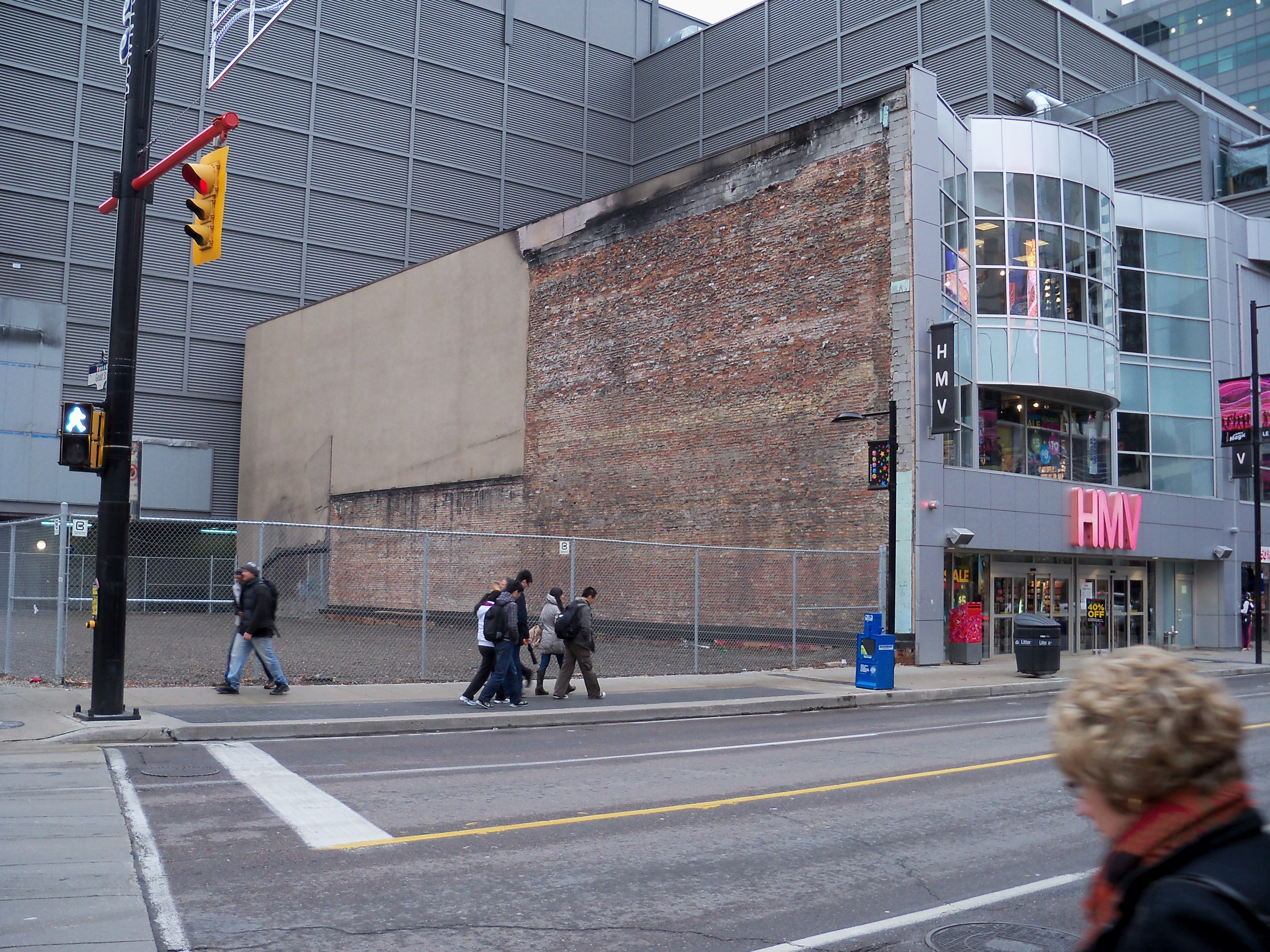
335 in December 2011, after engineers determined the damage to the building could not be repaired, and the ruins were demolished.

The building was severely damaged by fire on January 3, 2011. At the time, the owners were planning a meeting with the City of Toronto to discuss their strategy for promptly restoring the property. After the building's destruction Heritage Toronto quoted from the intent to designate application describing the building as a "local landmark", and a "well-crafted example of a late 19th century commercial building that blends elements of the popular Second Empire and Romanesque Revival styles of the era."

A security camera captured an individual whose face was obscured by a hood in the vicinity of the building around the time the fire was set.

After an investigation (profiled in The Detectives on CBC Television in 2018), Stewart Poirier was charged with the arson and convicted; he was sentenced to ten years in December 2012. Poirier died of natural causes on February 10, 2013, while incarcerated at the Joyceville Institution.

Eventually, the site was cleared and taken over by developer Rumpf Corporation who was building a commercial property in late 2017, to be owned and managed by Prime Corporation.
