= Harrogate Baptist Church =

Church in Harrogate, England

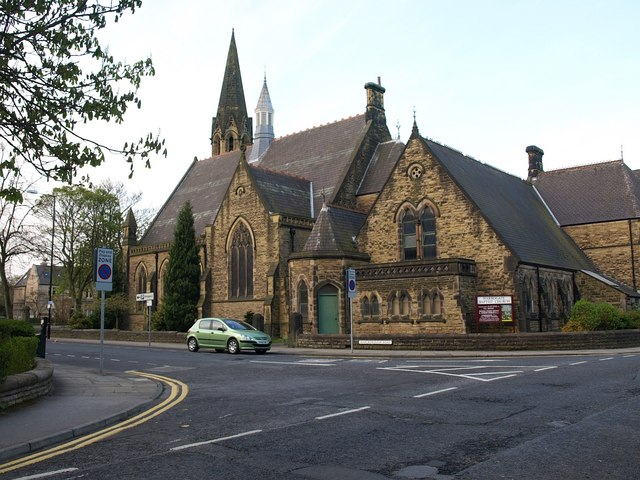
- Harrogate Baptist Church

- Location within North Yorkshire Location within England
- 53.9916316°N 1.5355024°W
- Denomination: Baptist
- Website: www.harrogatebaptistchurch.org.uk

Harrogate Baptist Church is located on Victoria Avenue in Harrogate. It is a Grade II listed building.

== History ==
Harrogate Baptist Church opened in 1883. It was designed by William Peachey.

== Organ ==
The church started with a 2 manual pipe organ dating from 1884 by William Hill. This was rebuilt in 1898 by James Jepson Binns. The specification can be found on the National Pipe Organ Register.

== See also ==
- Listed buildings in Harrogate (High Harrogate Ward)
