= Granby Hotel =

Hotel in Harrogate, North Yorkshire, England

Coordinates: 53.9962°N 1.5227°W

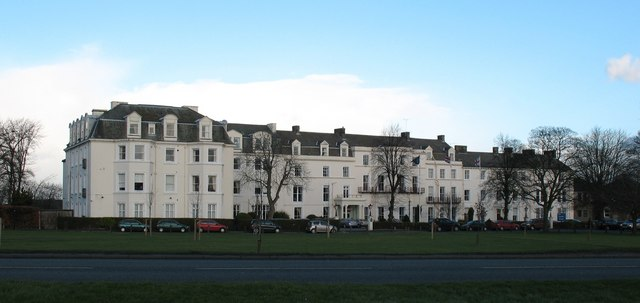
The building, in 2008

The Granby Hotel is a historic building in Harrogate, a town in North Yorkshire, in England.

The first hotel on the site was the "Sinking Ship", which opened in 1670. By 1736, it was named "The Royal Oak", at the time that John Metcalf was recorded as playing the fiddle there. It had a barn which was used as the first theatre in the town. The oldest part of the current building dates from the mid 18th century, and in 1795 it was renamed as the Granby. The building was refronted in the early 19th century, and it expanded to incorporate terraces of former houses either side. By 1861, it had 150 bedrooms. The hotel closed in 1992, and the building became a care home. It was grade II listed in 1987.

The building is rendered and has a slate roof. The central block has three storeys and five bays, the middle three bays projecting and splayed, with a floor band, a string course, a cornice and a parapet. The windows are recessed sashes with architraves and keystones, and in the middle floor is a cast iron balcony. The block is flanked by long irregular wings with three storeys and attics with dormers. To the left of the main block is a prostyle portico with paired Corinthian columns.

== See also ==
- Listed buildings in Harrogate (Granby Ward)
