= Wesleyan Methodist Chapel, Grove Road, Harrogate =

Grade II listed building in North Yorkshire, England

Coordinates: 54.00048°N 1.53574°W

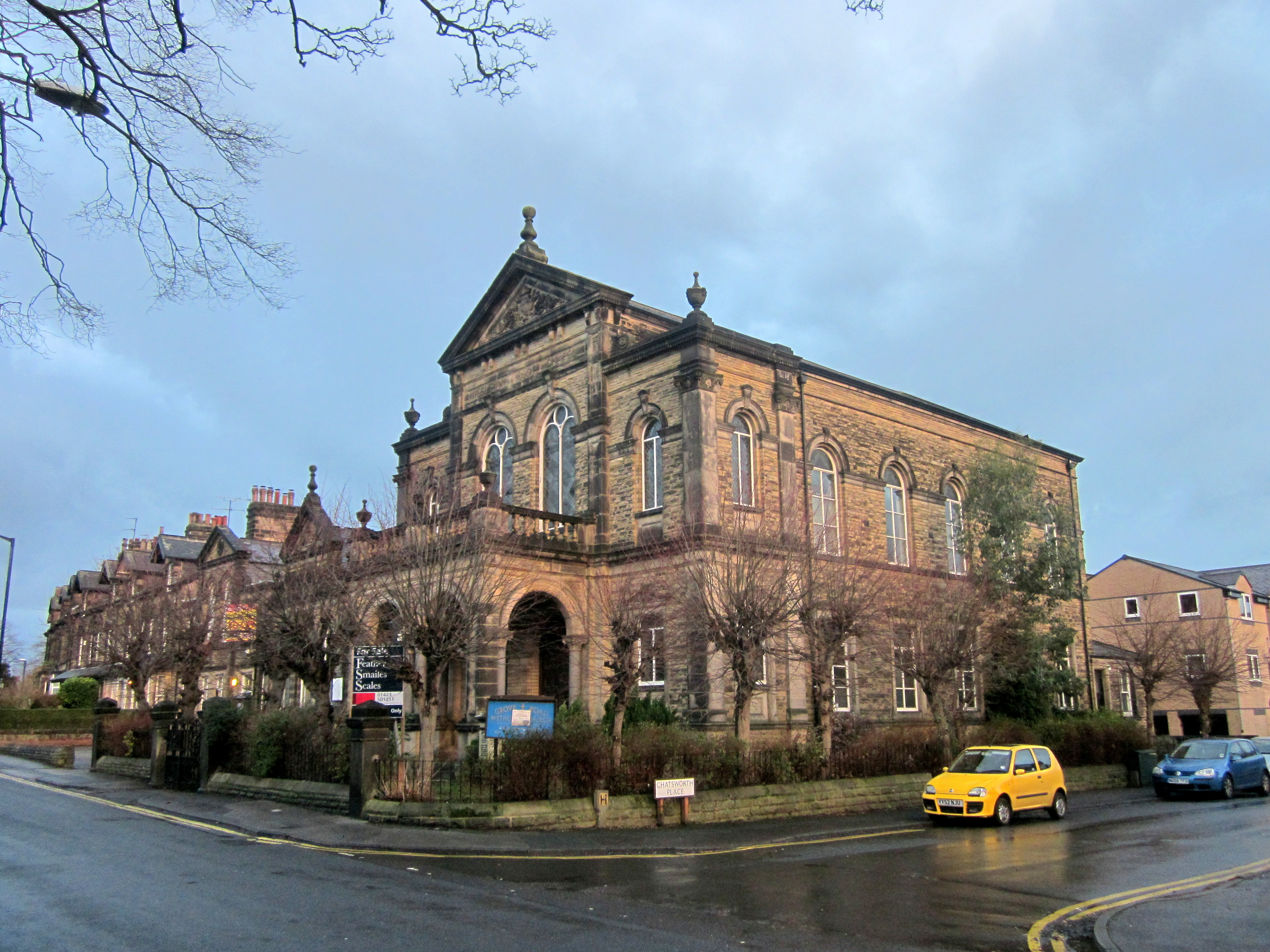
Wesleyan Methodist Chapel

The Wesleyan Methodist Chapel is a Grade II listed building in Grove Road, Harrogate, North Yorkshire, England. It was built in 1896 as a 1,000-seat Wesleyan Methodist chapel but has since been converted into a six-bedroom house.

== See also ==
- Listed buildings in Harrogate (High Harrogate Ward)
