= St Andrew's Church, Starbeck =

Coordinates: 54.0006°N 1.4964°W

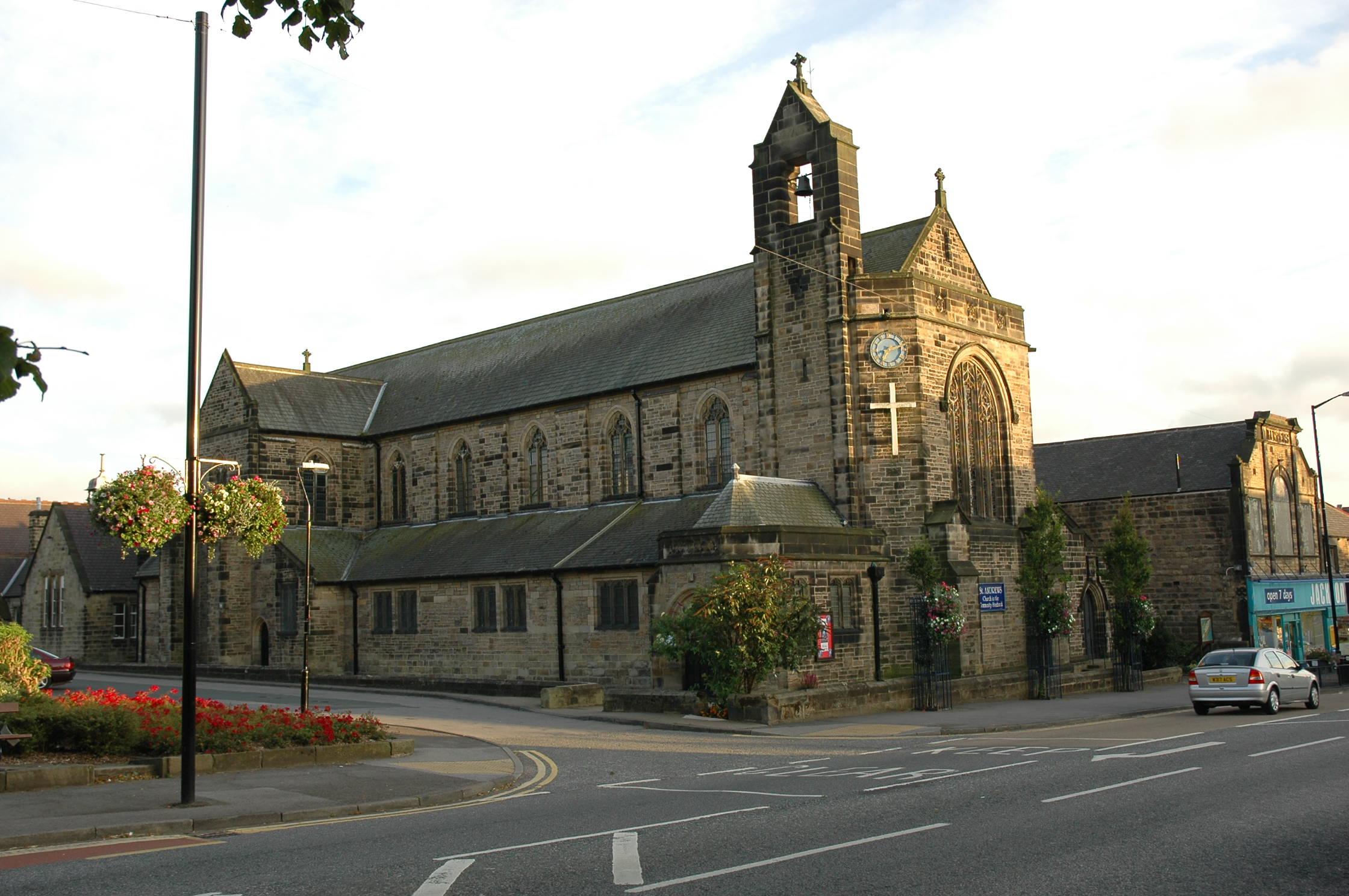
- St Andrew's Church, Starbeck, from the northwest

- Location in North Yorkshire
- OS grid reference: SE 330 561
- Location: High Street, Starbeck, Harrogate, North Yorkshire
- Country: England
- Denomination: Anglican
- Churchmanship: Evangelical
- Website: St Andrew, Starbeck

History
- Status: Parish church
- Dedication: Saint Andrew

Architecture
- Functional status: Active
- Heritage designation: Grade II
- Designated: 26 April 1994
- Architect: Austin and Paley
- Architectural type: Church
- Style: Gothic Revival
- Completed: 1910

Specifications
- Materials: Stone, slate roofs

Administration
- Province: York
- Diocese: Leeds
- Archdeaconry: Richmond
- Deanery: Harrogate
- Parish: St Andrew, Starbeck

Clergy
- Vicar: Philip Carman

St Andrew's Church is in High Street, Starbeck, Harrogate, North Yorkshire, England. It is an active Anglican parish church in the deanery of Harrogate, the archdeaconry of Richmond, and the Diocese of Leeds. The church is recorded in the National Heritage List for England as a designated Grade II listed building. The current vicar is the Reverend Phil Carman.

== History ==
St Andrew's was built in 1909–10, and designed by the Lancaster architects Austin and Paley. It replaced a school and mission church of 1889, which had provided seating for 200 people, with a church seating 608, at a cost of £6,800 (equivalent to £690,000 as of 2025).

== Architecture ==
The church is constructed in rubble stone with ashlar dressings, and has a slate roof. Its plan consists of a nave and chancel under a continuous roof with a clerestory, north and south aisles, north and south transepts, and north and south porches. Rising from the northwest corner is a single bellcote with its long side facing north. At the west end is a canted full-height projection containing a five-light window, supported by two short buttresses. Along the sides of the aisles are two and three-light windows under flat heads; the clerestory windows have two lights under pointed heads. The east window has five lights.

Inside the church is an open wooden roof, a wooden pulpit, a marble font, and reredoses behind the main altar and the altar in a side chapel. The two-manual pipe organ was made in 1898 by J. J. Binns of Leeds.

== See also ==
- List of ecclesiastical works by Austin and Paley (1895–1914)
