= List of mills in North Yorkshire =

This is a list of the wool, cotton and other textile mills in North Yorkshire

== Arncliffe ==
Name	Architect	Location	Built	Demolished	Served (Years)
Mill		Arncliffe, SD 9302 7189 54°08′34″N 2°06′30″W			
	Notes: National Building Register:63824: (B)				

== Askrigg ==
Name	Architect	Location	Built	Demolished	Served (Years)
Flaxmill Farm		Askrigg, SD 9448 9105 54°18′54″N 2°05′11″W			
	Notes: National Building Register:63825: (B)				

== Aysgarth ==
Name	Architect	Location	Built	Demolished	Served (Years)
Yore Mill		Aysgarth, SE 0115 8865 54°17′36″N 1°59′02″W			
	Notes: National Building Register:63828: (B)				

== Bainbridge ==
Name	Architect	Location	Built	Demolished	Served (Years)
Silk Mill		Bainbridge, SD 9125 8710 54°16′46″N 2°08′09″W			
	Notes: National Building Register:63823: (A)				

== Bentham ==
Name	Architect	Location	Built	Demolished	Served (Years)
High Bentham Mill		Bentham, SD 6660 6875 54°06′49″N 2°30′45″W			
	Notes: National Building Register:63814: (B)				
Low Mill		Bentham, SD 6490 6929 54°07′06″N 2°32′19″W			
	Notes: National Building Register:63813: (B)				

== Bewerley ==
Name	Architect	Location	Built	Demolished	Served (Years)
Foster Beck Mill		Bewerley, SE 1478 6641 54°05′36″N 1°46′32″W			
	Notes: National Building Register:63841: (B)				
Hollin House Mill		Bewerley, SE 1708 6391 54°04′15″N 1°44′26″W			
	Notes: National Building Register:63830: (C)				
Riggs Will		Bewerley, SE 1557 6533 54°05′01″N 1°45′49″W			
	Notes: National Building Register:63845: (B)				

== Bilton With Harrogate ==
Name	Architect	Location	Built	Demolished	Served (Years)
Bleach Green		Bilton With Harrogate, SE 310 565 54°00′13″N 1°31′43″W			
	Notes: National Building Register:860: (B)				
Bleach Yard		Bilton With Harrogate, SE 317 575 54°00′45″N 1°31′04″W			
	Notes: National Building Register:861: (B)				

== Birstwith ==
Name	Architect	Location	Built	Demolished	Served (Years)
Wreaks Mill		Birstwith, SE 2440 5965 54°01′56″N 1°37′44″W			
	Notes: National Building Register:63859: (B)				

== Bishop Thornton ==
Name	Architect	Location	Built	Demolished	Served (Years)
‘High Mill		Bishop Thornton, SE 2525 6270 54°03′35″N 1°36′57″W			
	Notes: National Building Register:63838: (A)				
Low Mill		Bishop Thornton, SE 2552 6245 54°03′26″N 1°36′42″W			
	Notes: National Building Register:63840: (B)				
Render Mill		Bishop Thornton,			
	Notes: (see Woodfield Mill)				
Woodfield Mill		Bishop Thornton, SE 2359 6339 54°03′57″N 1°38′28″W			
	Notes: National Building Register:63843: (A)				

== Brearton ==
Name	Architect	Location	Built	Demolished	Served (Years)
ScottonMill		Brearton, SE 3150 5857 54°01′20″N 1°31′15″W			
	Notes: National Building Register:63852: (B)				

== Carleton ==
Name	Architect	Location	Built	Demolished	Served (Years)
Carleton Mill		Carleton, SD 9720 4970 53°56′36″N 2°02′39″W			
	Notes: National Building Register:62142: (B)				
Mill		Carleton, SD 9735 4964 53°56′34″N 2°02′31″W			
	Notes: National Building Register:62143: (B)				
The Wend, Carleton		Carleton, SD 9710 4960 53°56′33″N 2°02′44″W			
	Notes: National Building Register:62158: (B)				

== Cononley ==
Name	Architect	Location	Built	Demolished	Served (Years)
Station Mills		Cononley, SD 9936 4685 53°55′04″N 2°00′40″W			
	Notes: National Building Register:62124: (B)				

== Cowling ==
Name	Architect	Location	Built	Demolished	Served (Years)
Acre Shed		Cowling, SD 9729 4305 53°53′01″N 2°02′34″W			
	Notes: National Building Register:62133: (B)				
Carr Mills		Cowling, SD 9731 4279 53°52′53″N 2°02′33″W			
	Notes: National Building Register:62134: (B)				
Croft Mill		Cowling, SD 9750 4335 53°53′11″N 2°02′22″W			
	Notes: National Building Register:62131: (B)				
Freegate Mill		Cowling, SD 9640 4290 53°52′56″N 2°03′23″W			
	Notes: National Building Register:62135: (B)				
Ickornshaw Mill		Cowling, SD 9685 4230 53°52′37″N 2°02′58″W			
	Notes: National Building Register:62129: (B)				
Lumb Mill		Cowling, SD 9878 4448 53°53′47″N 2°01′12″W			
	Notes: National Building Register:62126: (B)				
Mill		Cowling, SD 9800 4380 53°53′25″N 2°01′55″W			
	Notes: National Building Register:62130: (B)				
Royd Mill		Cowling, SD 9739 4320 53°53′06″N 2°02′28″W			
	Notes: National Building Register:62132: (B)				

== Dacre ==
Name	Architect	Location	Built	Demolished	Served (Years)
Banks Mill		Dacre, SE 1999 6235 54°03′24″N 1°41′46″W			
	Notes: National Building Register:63836: (B)				
Dacre Banks Mill		Dacre,			
	Notes: (see Banks Mill)				

== Embsay With Eastby ==
Name	Architect	Location	Built	Demolished	Served (Years)
Crown Spindle Works		Embsay With Eastby, SE 0025 5430 53°59′05″N 1°59′52″W			
	Notes: National Building Register:62276: (B)				
Loomshop		Embsay With Eastby, SE 0080 5381 53°58′49″N 1°59′21″W			
	Notes: National Building Register:62274: (B)				
Loomshop		Embsay With Eastby, SE 0000 5300 53°58′23″N 2°00′05″W			
	Notes: National Building Register:62275: (B)				
Millholme Shed		Embsay With Eastby, SE 0065 5345 53°58′38″N 1°59′30″W			
	Notes: National Building Register:62272: (B)				
Primrose Mill		Embsay With Eastby, SE 0060 5375 53°58′47″N 1°59′32″W			
	Notes: National Building Register:62273: (B)				

== Farnhill ==
Name	Architect	Location	Built	Demolished	Served (Years)
Aireside Mills		Farnhill, SD 9970 4682 53°55′03″N 2°00′22″W			
	Notes: National Building Register:62125: (B)				

== Fewston ==
Name	Architect	Location	Built	Demolished	Served (Years)
West House Mill		Fewston, SE 168 555 53°59′43″N 1°44′43″W			
	Notes: National Building Register:849: (B)				

== Gargrave ==
Name	Architect	Location	Built	Demolished	Served (Years)
Goffa Mill		Gargrave, SD 9339 5395 53°58′54″N 2°06′08″W			
	Notes: National Building Register:62116: (B)				
Low Mill		Gargrave,			
	Notes: (see Goffa Mill)				
Allied Mills		Gargrave, SE 2481 2884 53°45′19″N 1°37′31″W			
	Notes: National Building Register:63505: (C)				
Deanhurst Mill		Gargrave, SE 2490 2890 53°45′21″N 1°37′26″W			
	Notes: National Building Register:63504: (B)				
Highfield Mills		Gargrave, SE 2499 2910 53°45′28″N 1°37′21″W			
	Notes: National Building Register:63503: (B)				
Maiden Mills		Gargrave, SE 2457 2926 53°45′33″N 1°37′44″W			
	Notes: National Building Register:63502: (B)				
Moorhead Mill		Gargrave, SE 2385 2985 53°45′52″N 1°38′23″W			
	Notes: National Building Register:63478: (B)				
St Bernard’s Mill		Gargrave, SE 2585 2995 53°45′55″N 1°36′34″W			
	Notes: National Building Register:63557: (C)				
Springfield Mills		Gargrave, SE 2442 2930 53°45′34″N 1°37′52″W			
	Notes: National Building Register:63501: (C)				
Union Mill		Gargrave,			
	Notes: (see Moorhead Mill)				

== Giusburn ==
Name	Architect	Location	Built	Demolished	Served (Years)
Hayfield Mills		Giusburn, SE 0010 4470 53°53′54″N 2°00′00″W			
	Notes: National Building Register:62278: (B)				
Junction Mills		Giusburn, SE 0140 4500 53°54′04″N 1°58′49″W			
	Notes: National Building Register:62282: (B)				
Midland Mills		Giusburn, SE 0095 4536 53°54′16″N 1°59′13″W			
	Notes: National Building Register:62277: (A)				
Standard Mills		Giusburn, SE 0125 4535 53°54′15″N 1°58′57″W			
	Notes: National Building Register:62281: (B)				

== Grassington ==
Name	Architect	Location	Built	Demolished	Served (Years)
Low Mill		Grassington, SE 0068 6322 54°03′54″N 1°59′28″W			
	Notes: National Building Register:63827: (B)				
Albion Dyeworks		Grassington, SE 1949 4220 53°52′32″N 1°42′18″W			
	Notes: National Building Register:62321: (B)				
Cassfield Works		Grassington, SE 1905 4187 53°52′22″N 1°42′42″W			
	Notes: National Building Register:62323: (B)				
Cotton Processingworks		Grassington, SE 1858 4197 53°52′25″N 1°43′08″W			
	Notes: National Building Register:62318: (B)				
Gordon Mills		Grassington, SE 1855 4271 53°52′49″N 1°43′10″W			
	Notes: National Building Register:62315: (B)				
Green Bottom Dyeworks		Grassington, SE 1920 4175 53°52′18″N 1°42′34″W			
	Notes: National Building Register:62324: (B)				
Green Bottom Mill		Grassington,			
	Notes: (see Green Bottom Dyeworks)				
Cuiseley Low Mill		Grassington, SE 1940 4110 53°51′57″N 1°42′23″W			
	Notes: National Building Register:62326: (B)				
High Croftworks		Grassington, SE 1945 4240 53°52′39″N 1°42′20″W			
	Notes: National Building Register:62320: (B)				
Liberty Mills		Grassington, SE 1850 4220 53°52′32″N 1°43′12″W			
	Notes: National Building Register:62317: (B)				
Netherfield Mill		Grassington, SE 1875 4235 53°52′37″N 1°42′59″W			
	Notes: National Building Register:62316: (B)				
Nunroyd Mills		Grassington, SE 1955 4150 53°52′10″N 1°42′15″W			
	Notes: National Building Register:62325: (B)				
Spring Head Mill		Grassington, SE 1930 4205 53°52′27″N 1°42′29″W			
	Notes: National Building Register:62322: (B)				

== Hartlington ==
Name	Architect	Location	Built	Demolished	Served (Years)
Hartlington Mill		Hartlington, SE 0417 6096 54°02′40″N 1°56′16″W			
	Notes: National Building Register:42907: (B)				

== Hartwith Cum Winsley ==
Name	Architect	Location	Built	Demolished	Served (Years)
High Mill		Hartwith Cum Winsley, SE 1915 6329 54°03′55″N 1°42′32″W			
	Notes: National Building Register:63833: (C)				
Knox Mill		Hartwith Cum Winsley, SE 1902 6394 54°04′16″N 1°42′39″W			
	Notes: National Building Register:63842: (A)				
Low Mill		Hartwith Cum Winsley, SE 1890 6355 54°04′03″N 1°42′46″W			
	Notes: National Building Register:63832: (B)				
New York Dyeworks		Hartwith Cum Winsley,			
	Notes: (see New York Mills)				
New York Mills		Hartwith Cum Winsley, SE 1955 6285 54°03′40″N 1°42′10″W			
	Notes: National Building Register:63835: (B)				

== Hawes ==
Name	Architect	Location	Built	Demolished	Served (Years)
Gayle Mill		Hawes, SD 8711 8939 54°18′00″N 2°11′58″W			
	Notes: National Building Register:63829: (A)				

== Healey With Sutton (Healey) ==
Name	Architect	Location	Built	Demolished	Served (Years)
Healey Corn Mill		Healey With Sutton (Healey), SE 1855 8014 54°13′00″N 1°43′01″W			
	Notes: National Building Register:63844: (B)				
Healey Saw Mill		Healey With Sutton (Healey),			
	Notes: (see Healey Corn Mill)				

== Heslington ==
Name	Architect	Location	Built	Demolished	Served (Years)
Heslington Bleach Works		Heslington, SE 6210 5055 53°56′50″N 1°03′19″W			
	Notes: National Building Register:63868: (C)				

== Hartwith Cum Winsley ==
Name	Architect	Location	Built	Demolished	Served (Years)
Fell Beck Mill (HLB)		Hartwith Cum Winsley, SE 1961 6531 54°05′00″N 1°42′06″W			
	Notes: National Building Register:63846: (B)				
Glasshouses Mill (HLB)		Hartwith Cum Winsley, SE 1718 6435 54°04′29″N 1°44′20″W			
	Notes: National Building Register:6383l: (A)				
Smelt House Mill (HLB)		Hartwith Cum Winsley, SE 1920 6340 54°03′58″N 1°42′29″W			
	Notes: National Building Register:63834: (C)				

== Ingleton ==
Name	Architect	Location	Built	Demolished	Served (Years)
Ingleton Mill		Ingleton, SD 6942 7328 54°09′16″N 2°28′11″W			
	Notes: National Building Register:63815: (B)				

== Kirkby Malham ==
Name	Architect	Location	Built	Demolished	Served (Years)
Scalegill Mill		Kirkby Malham, SD 8991 6168 54°03′03″N 2°09′20″W			
	Notes: National Building Register:63822: (B)				

== Knaresborough ==
Name	Architect	Location	Built	Demolished	Served (Years)
Flax-dressing shop, Green Dragon Yard		Knaresborough, SE 350 579 54°00′57″N 1°28′02″W			
	Notes: National Building Register:865: (B)				
Flax-dressing shop, Whiteleys Yard		Knaresborough, SE 350 572 54°00′35″N 1°28′03″W			
	Notes: National Building Register:863: (B)				
High Street, 25		Knaresborough, SE 3499 5709 54°00′31″N 1°28′03″W			
	Notes: National Building Register:63870: (B)				
Kirkgate,15		Knaresborough, SE 3492 5703 54°00′29″N 1°28′07″W			
	Notes: National Building Register:63864: (B)				
Linen Mill		Knaresborough, SE 3471 5739 54°00′41″N 1°28′19″W			
	Notes: National Building Register:63854: (B)				
Raw Gap, weaving shop		Knaresborough, SE 3495 5720 54°00′35″N 1°28′06″W			
	Notes: National Building Register:63862: (B)				
The Old Tannery, York Place		Knaresborough, SE 352 569 54°00′25″N 1°27′52″W			
	Notes: National Building Register:866: (B)				

== Langcliffe ==
Name	Architect	Location	Built	Demolished	Served (Years)
Langcliffe Mill		Langcliffe, SD 8161 6505 54°04′52″N 2°16′57″W			
	Notes: National Building Register:63821: (B)				
Langcliffe Shed		Langcliffe, SD 8175 6435 54°04′29″N 2°16′49″W			
	Notes: National Building Register:63820: (A)				

== Lothersdale ==
Name	Architect	Location	Built	Demolished	Served (Years)
Dale End Mill		Lothersdale, SD 9595 4590 53°54′33″N 2°03′47″W			
	Notes: National Building Register:62128: (B)				

== Menwith With Darley ==
Name	Architect	Location	Built	Demolished	Served (Years)
Darley High Mill		Menwith With Darley, SE 1947 5988 54°02′04″N 1°42′15″W			
	Notes: National Building Register:63858: (B)				
Fringill Mill		Menwith With Darley, SE 2063 5924 54°01′43″N 1°41′12″W			
	Notes: National Building Register:63851: (A)				

== Mickley (Azerley) ==
Name	Architect	Location	Built	Demolished	Served (Years)
Mickley Mill		Mickley (Azerley), SE 2531 7702 54°11′18″N 1°36′49″W			
	Notes: National Building Register:63839: (B)				

== Plompton ==
Name	Architect	Location	Built	Demolished	Served (Years)
Plompton Mill		Plompton, SE 3610 5598 53°59′55″N 1°27′03″W			
	Notes: National Building Register:63853: (B)				

== Scriven (Harrogate;Knaresborough) ==
Name	Architect	Location	Built	Demolished	Served (Years)
Castle Mill (K)		Scriven (Harrogate;Knaresborough), SE 3478 5681 54°00′22″N 1°28′15″W			
	Notes: National Building Register:63850: (A)				
Crimple Mill (H)		Scriven (Harrogate;Knaresborough), SE 3305 5377 53°58′44″N 1°29′51″W			
	Notes: National Building Register:63855: (B)				

== Settle ==
Name	Architect	Location	Built	Demolished	Served (Years)
Bridge End Mill		Settle SD 8170 6411 54°04′21″N 2°16′52″W			
	Notes: National Building Register:63819: (B)				
Kings Mill		Settle, SD 8142 6388 54°04′14″N 2°17′07″W			
	Notes: National Building Register:63818: (B)				
Runley Bridge Mill		Settle, SD 8110 6230 54°03′23″N 2°17′25″W			
	Notes: National Building Register:63817: (A)				
Sniff Mill		Settle,			
	Notes: (see Kings Mill)				

== Skipton ==
Name	Architect	Location	Built	Demolished	Served (Years)
Belle Vue Mills		Skipton, SD 9861 5160 53°57′38″N 2°01′22″W			
	Notes: National Building Register:62117: (A)				
Broughton Road Shed		Skipton, SD 9770 5145 53°57′33″N 2°02′12″W			
	Notes: National Building Register:62123: (A)				
Firth Sheds		Skipton, SD 9905 5105 53°57′20″N 2°00′57″W			
	Notes: National Building Register:62120: (B)				
High Mill		Skipton, SD 9919 5214 53°57′55″N 2°00′50″W			
	Notes: National Building Register:62121: (C)				
Low M111		Skipton, SD 9905 5125 53°57′26″N 2°00′57″W			
	Notes: National Building Register:62119: (B)				
Park Hill		Skipton, SD 9939 5161 53°57′38″N 2°00′39″W			
	Notes: National Building Register:62122: (B)				
Union Mills		Skipton, SD 989 511 53°57′21″N 2°01′06″W			
	Notes: National Building Register:118: (B)				
Victoria Mill		Skipton, SD 9869 5170 53°57′41″N 2°01′17″W			
	Notes: National Building Register:44101: (B)				

== Sutton-in-Craven (Sutton) ==
Name	Architect	Location	Built	Demolished	Served (Years)
Croft Shed		Sutton-in-Craven (Sutton), SE 0055 4395 53°53′30″N 1°59′35″W			
	Notes: National Building Register:62280: (B)				
Greenroyd Mills		Sutton-in-Craven (Sutton), SE 0060 4405 53°53′33″N 1°59′32″W			
	Notes: National Building Register:62279: (B)				
Sutton Mills		Sutton-in-Craven (Sutton), SE 0100 4440 53°53′45″N 1°59′11″W			
	Notes: National Building Register:62283: (B)				
Sutton Old Mill		Sutton-in-Craven (Sutton),			
	Notes: (see Greenroyd Mills)				

== Thornthwaite With Padside ==
Name	Architect	Location	Built	Demolished	Served (Years)
Folly Gill Flax Mill		Thornthwaite With Padside, SE 1814 5895 54°01′34″N 1°43′29″W			
	Notes: National Building Register:63857: (B)				

== Thruscross ==
Name	Architect	Location	Built	Demolished	Served (Years)
HighMill		Thruscross, SE 137 581 54°01′07″N 1°47′33″W			
	Notes: National Building Register:847: (B)				
HighMill		Thruscross, SE 146 580 54°01′04″N 1°46′43″W			
	Notes: National Building Register:856: (B)				
Little Mill		Thruscross, SE 143 580 54°01′04″N 1°47′00″W			
	Notes: National Building Register:848: (B)				
Low Mill, West End		Thruscross, SE 1510 5784 54°00′59″N 1°46′16″W			
	Notes: National Building Register:37899: (B)				
Patrick’s Mill		Thruscross,			
	Notes: (see High Mill, 63856)				

== Winksley ==
Name	Architect	Location	Built	Demolished	Served (Years)
Millhouse Farm		Winksley, SE 2479 7116 54°08′08″N 1°37′19″W			
	Notes: National Building Register:63837: (B)				

== York ==
Name	Architect	Location	Built	Demolished	Served (Years)
Lawrence Street Flax Mill		York, SE 6113 5133 53°57′16″N 1°04′12″W			
	Notes: National Building Register:60732: (A)				
Providence Place Linen Manufactory		York, SE 609 516 53°57′25″N 1°04′24″W			
	Notes: National Building Register:63869: (B)				
