= Dougill Hall =

House in North Yorkshire, England

Coordinates: 54°02′56″N 1°41′23″W

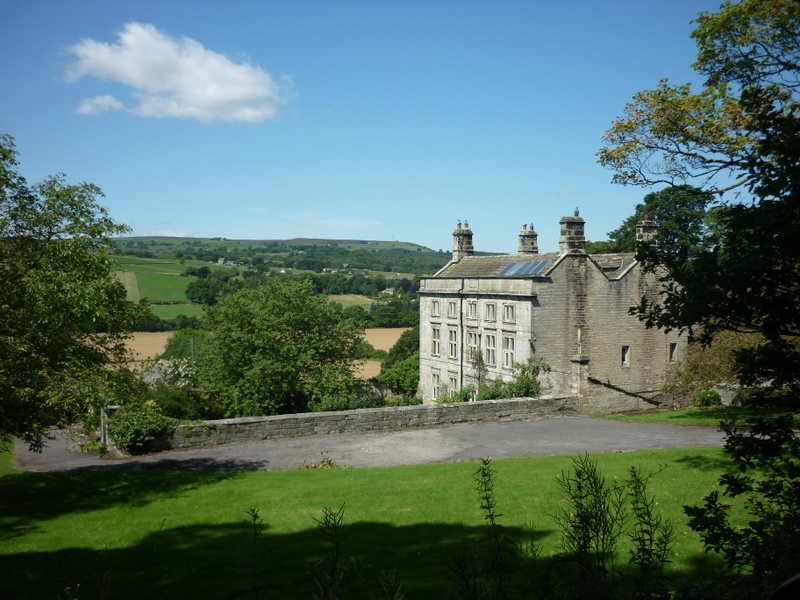
The building, in 2011

Dougill Hall is a historic building in Summerbridge, North Yorkshire, a hamlet in England.

The house was built in 1722, for John Dougill. Nikolaus Pevsner describes the building as having "a handsome five-bay front, a good example of the local manner". In 1910, a single-storey extension was added to the right of the house, and an old service building behind it was converted into a flat in 1980. The building was grade II* listed in 1952. In 2024, it was described as having a dining room, drawing room, snug, kitchen, utility room, workshop, cloakroom and various storerooms on the ground floor, along with the annexe with a lounge, bedroom, bathroom and kitchen. It had three bedrooms and a bathroom on the first floor; and four bedrooms and a play area on the second floor. It had five-and-a-half acres of grounds, including a paddock, and was offered for sale at £2.3 million.

The house is built of gritstone, with a deep moulded eaves cornice and a blocking course with panels, and a stone slate M-shaped roof with stone coping. It has three storeys, a double depth plan, five bays, and a two-storey two-bay rear service wing. The central doorway has an eared and shouldered architrave, a dated and initialled lintel and a cornice. On the front, the lower two storeys contain cross windows, each with a moulded architrave, a pulvinated frieze and a cornice, and in the top floor are two-light mullioned windows with architraves and keystones. At the rear are recessed chamfered mullioned windows, and shaped kneelers. Inside, the front left room has original pine panelling including a cupboard. The rear left room has original plasterwork to the ceiling and a fireplace built in 1970 which incorporates a lintel from an outbuilding, inscribed "R 1612 D". Other original features include the main staircase and many of the doors.

== See also ==
- Grade II* listed buildings in North Yorkshire (district)
- Listed buildings in Hartwith cum Winsley
