= Smelthouses =

Settlement in North Yorkshire, England

Coordinates: 54.074°N 1.708°W

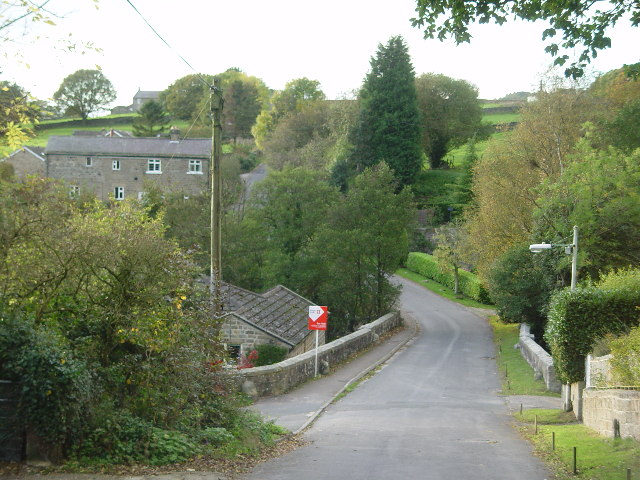
- Smelthouses Bridge

- Location within North Yorkshire
- OS grid reference: SE202642
- Civil parish: Hartwith cum Winsley and High and Low Bishopside
- Unitary authority: North Yorkshire
- Ceremonial county: North Yorkshire
- Region: Yorkshire and the Humber
- Country: England
- Sovereign state: United Kingdom
- Post town: HARROGATE
- Postcode district: HG3
- Dialling code: 01423
- Police: North Yorkshire
- Fire: North Yorkshire
- Ambulance: Yorkshire
- UK Parliament: Skipton and Ripon

Smelthouses is a hamlet in Nidderdale in North Yorkshire, England. It lies about 2.3 miles (4 km) south-east of Pateley Bridge, on either side of Fell Beck, a small tributary of the River Nidd. Fell Beck here forms the boundary between the civil parishes of Hartwith cum Winsley and High and Low Bishopside, so that the settlement is divided between the two parishes.

In the Middle Ages Fell Beck was the boundary between the lands of the Archbishop of York (which became High and Low Bishopside) and the manor of Brimham held by Fountains Abbey (which became Hartwith cum Winsley). Fountains Abbey had a grange at Wyse Ing at what is now Smelthouses. By the middle of the 15th century, the abbey had a bellows-blown lead smelting mill there, which gave its name to the hamlet, but there is no record of its use in the 16th century or at the dissolution of the abbey.

In 1795 a flax-spinning mill was started on the west side of the beck at Smelthouses. The mill flourished in the 19th century, but was burned down in 1890. In the early 20th century there was a rope and twine business at Little Mill in Smelthouses.

A Wesleyan chapel was opened at Smelthouses in 1841 to serve the industrial hamlet. It was replaced by a chapel at Wilsill in 1897.

The road from Pateley Bridge to Knaresborough historically passed through Smelthouses. Under an Act of Parliament of 1759 a turnpike trust was formed to build a new toll road on the route. In 1761 the trust built a new bridge over Fell Beck at Smelthouses, and rebuilt it in 1802. The bridge is now a Grade II listed building. However the route was abandoned as a turnpike in 1828, when the trust diverted the route to a new line from Wilsill to Burnt Yates via Summerbridge, now followed by the B6165.

== Notable locals ==
- Catherine Bennett, journalist

== See also ==
- Listed buildings in Hartwith cum Winsley
