= New York, North Yorkshire =

Settlement in North Yorkshire, England

Coordinates: 54.061300°N 1.701200°W

New York
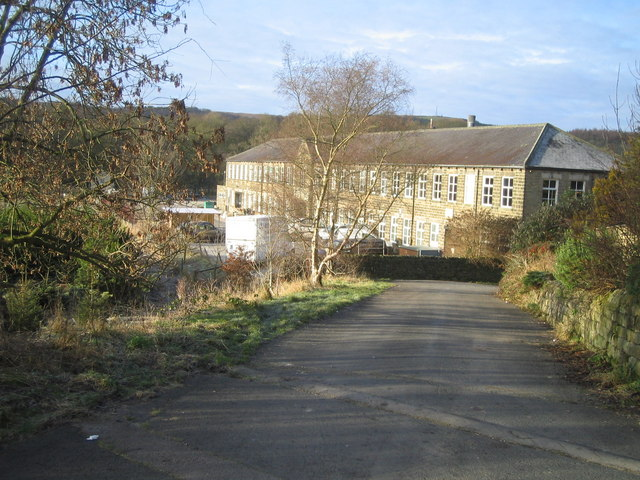
- New York Mill

- Location within North Yorkshire
- OS grid reference: SE196628
- Civil parish: Hartwith cum Winsley
- Unitary authority: North Yorkshire
- Ceremonial county: North Yorkshire
- Region: Yorkshire and the Humber
- Country: England
- Sovereign state: United Kingdom
- Post town: HARROGATE
- Postcode district: HG3
- Police: North Yorkshire
- Fire: North Yorkshire
- Ambulance: Yorkshire
- UK Parliament: Skipton and Ripon

New York is a settlement in Nidderdale in the county of North Yorkshire, England. It is on the River Nidd, near Summerbridge, and about 2.5 miles (4 km) south-east of Pateley Bridge.

Until 1974 it was part of the West Riding of Yorkshire. From 1974 to 2023 it was part of the Borough of Harrogate, it is now administered by the unitary North Yorkshire Council.

== History ==
The settlement originated as terraces of weavers' houses around a flax mill built by William Hebden in about 1814 on agricultural land by the River Nidd. In 1834 the mill was acquired by Francis Thorpe of Knaresborough, who renamed it New York Mill. By 1834 Thorpe was employing 150 people at the mill. In the 1870s the export of yarn declined, and the business failed in 1883. In 1889 the Gill family bought the mill, rebuilt it and replaced the old water wheels with a water turbine. In 1891 they installed a second turbine to provide the first electric light in Nidderdale. The Gills started to spin yarns of hemp for the production of twine. They modernised the mill in the 1930s, and in the 1960s started to spin artificial fibres for carpets. The Gill family sold the mill in 1968, and the new owners closed it in 1980. The property has now been converted into a small industrial estate.

== See also ==
- Listed buildings in Hartwith cum Winsley
