= St John's Church, Cononley =

Church in Cononley, North Yorkshire, England

Coordinates: 53°55′09″N 2°01′18″W

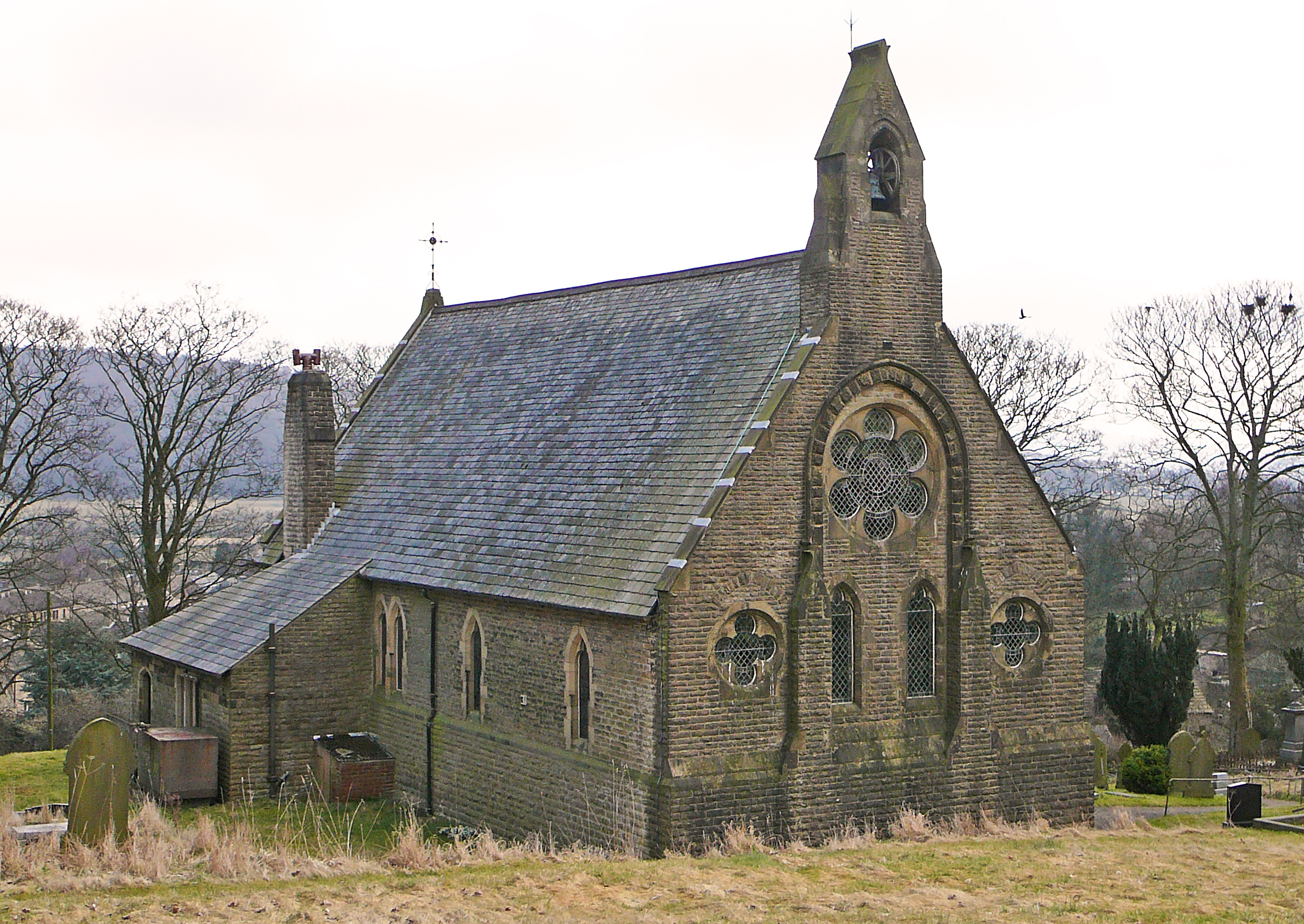
The church, in 2010

St John's Church is the parish church of Cononley, a village in North Yorkshire, in England.

A National School was opened in Cononley in 1846, and it was also used to hold Anglican church services. From 1854, the curate J. D. Wawn was based in the village, and he fundraised for the construction of a church in the village. It was designed by F. H. Pownall and was completed in 1864, at a cost of £1,200. It was consecrated by the Bishop of Ripon on the day of the Feast of Saint James. It was initially a chapel of ease to St Andrew's Church, Kildwick, but was given its own parish in 1871. The church was damaged by a major fire on 25 November 1946, in which most of the roof was destroyed, along with the vestry, but the windows, altar and war memorial survived.

The church was described on completion as "plan and substantial". It is in the Geometrical Gothic style and contains a continuous nave and chancel. There is a bellcote at the west end, and a gilded cross at the east end. A chancel screen was installed in 1893 by Wawn's widow, in his memory.
