= Hattie Shepparde =

Australian actress

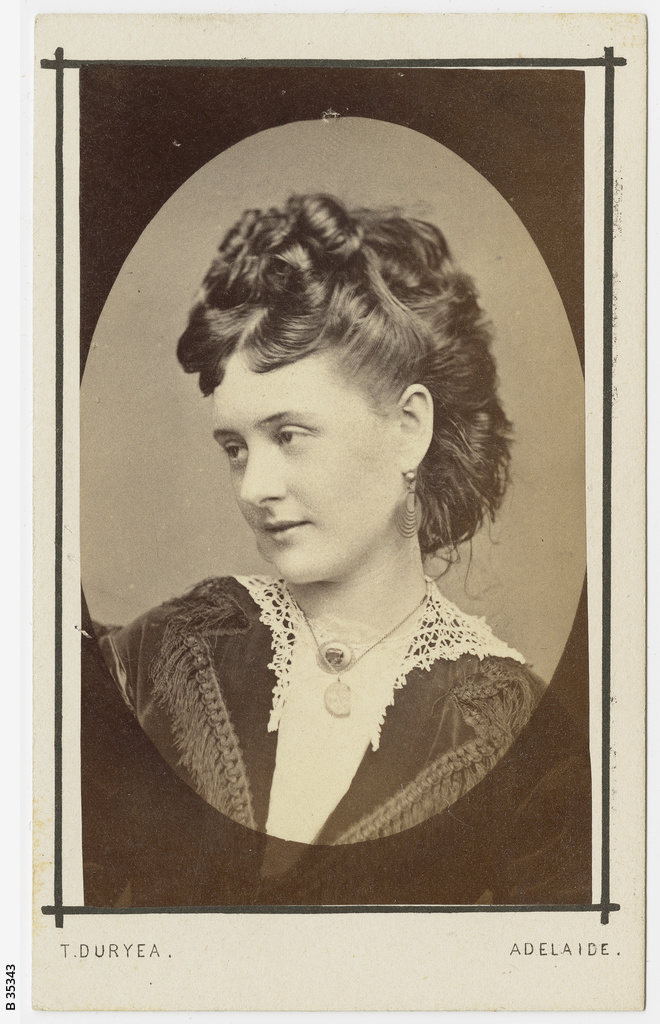
Hattie Shepparde – photograph by Townsend Duryea, Adelaide (c1874)

Hattie Shepparde (3 August 1846 – 22 September 1874) was an Australian actress who during her short career gained a growing reputation in her native land where she was highly regarded for ‘her intelligence, her ease, the grace of her manner and her thorough devotion to her art’. She died aged 28 after childbirth.

== Early life ==
Various legends sprang up about the origins of Hattie Shepparde during her short lifetime including that she was born into a theatrical family, whereas the truth was somewhat more prosaic. She was born as Mary Harriet Langmaid (sometimes Langmede or Langmead) in Launceston, Tasmania in 1846, the daughter of Amos Langmaid (1809–1894), a former convict but at this time a boot and shoemaker. Amos Langmaid married twice: firstly to Harriet Hill (1812–1874) in Launceston in 1836, and following his divorce from her to Hannah Hall (1831–1905) in 1852 in Melbourne and that between the two wives he fathered fourteen children, not all of whom survived. It is claimed that during her early life she went with her family to California where she was educated at the Convent of San Jose in San Francisco, but it is uncertain for what reason the family may have gone there.

== Stage career ==
Hattie Shepparde made her Australian stage début aged 5 when she played an angel in the burlesque Atalanta at the Royal Victoria Theatre in Adelaide before going on to play Agnes in an adaptation of David Copperfield at the Princess Theatre in Melbourne in 1861 aged 15. Such was the financial insecurity in her home that it was necessary for her to support herself from her teens. She played supporting and minor roles such as Georgina in Our American Cousin; Rowena in Rip Van Winkle; Julia in J. M. Morton's farce The Irish Tiger; Mrs. Clairbone in Dion Boucicault's Octoroon; Clementine in Robert Macaire; and Kate Nickleby in Boucicault's three-act comic drama Newman Noggs, based on Dickens's novel Nicholas Nickleby, all opposite the American actor Joseph Jefferson at the Haymarket Theatre in Melbourne (1862). Later in 1862, still with Jefferson, Shepparde played Hippolyta in A Midsummer Night's Dream; Ursula in Much Ado About Nothing; Julia in Henry Mayhew's farce The Wandering Minstrel; Eliza in Paul Pry and Mary in The Turnpike.

== Growing fame ==
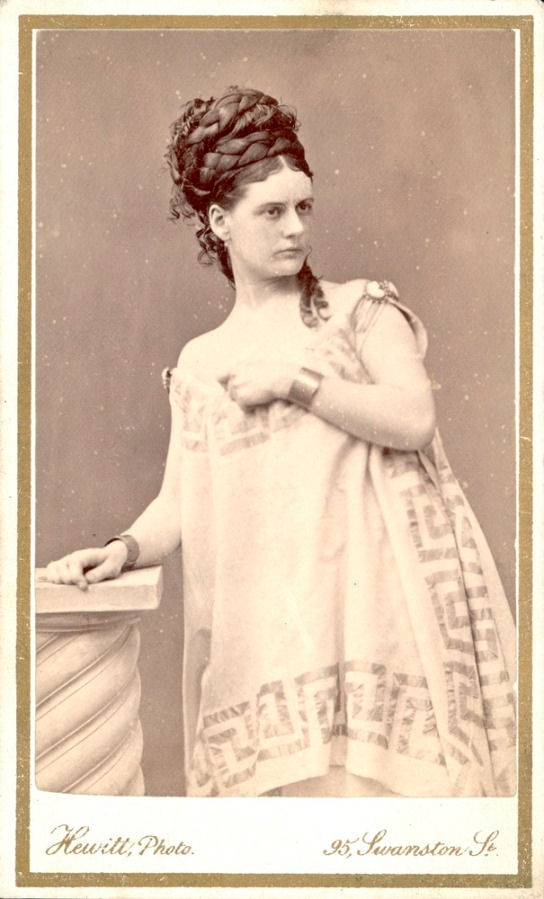
Shepparde by Charles Hewitt (1873)

Although still young Shepparde was gaining experience and improving as an actress, so when she joined the company of Emilia Don in 1865 in her native Tasmania she began to play somewhat bigger and more important roles including Louise in Not a Bad Judge; Mrs. Flighty in The Married Rake; Mrs. Wiley in Rural Felicity; Eugenia in Sweethearts and Wives; Julia in The Rivals; the dual roles of Zaide and Ardinehe in Ali Baba, or the Forty Thieves and the Duchess de Grantete in Child of the Regiment.

Between 1865 and 1870, she was in New Zealand taking part in a successful tour appearing in ‘all the towns where there was a theatre’ and returned to Australia in 1870, where initially she joined a touring company with a portable fit-up theatre before becoming involved with Marie Duret's company at the Theatre Royal, Hobart and then at the Haymarket Theatre and Theatre Royal in Melbourne playing Hortense Bertrand in Wonderful Woman and Meg in Meg's Diversion, a "heroine," wrote the critic of The Mercury, "whose frolicsome yet amiable disposition was delineated with much vivacity by Miss Shepparde." For Duret she also played the Marchioness de Bellerose in The World of Fashion ("Miss Shepparde played the part of the Marchioness de Bellerose with considerable dignity, and gave evidence of a histrionic talent which must render her a favourite member of the company"); Mrs. Delcour in War to the Knife; Countess Beauvilliers in Nothing Venture, Nothing Win; Mrs. Crotchet in the comic drama Don't Lend Your Umbrella, and Prince Pompetti in Cinderella, or the Lover, the Lackey, and the Glass Slipper, a pantomime that used real ponies to draw Cinderella's carriage, sometimes to the amusement of the audience when they misbehaved on stage.

During the 1870s, Hattie Shepparde became a star performer and a celebrity in Melbourne in particular, and attracted much attention for her roles, especially as a heroine in comedy. For her benefit at the Theatre Royal in Melbourne in June 1873, Shepparde selected T. W. Robertson's Caste in which she played Esther Eccles and was Cynisca in W. S. Gilbert's Pygmalion and Galatea following which she was presented with a diamond bracelet by a Committee of 'influential citizens' at a reception. She went on to appear as Darine in Gilbert's blank verse drama The Wicked World.

== Final years ==
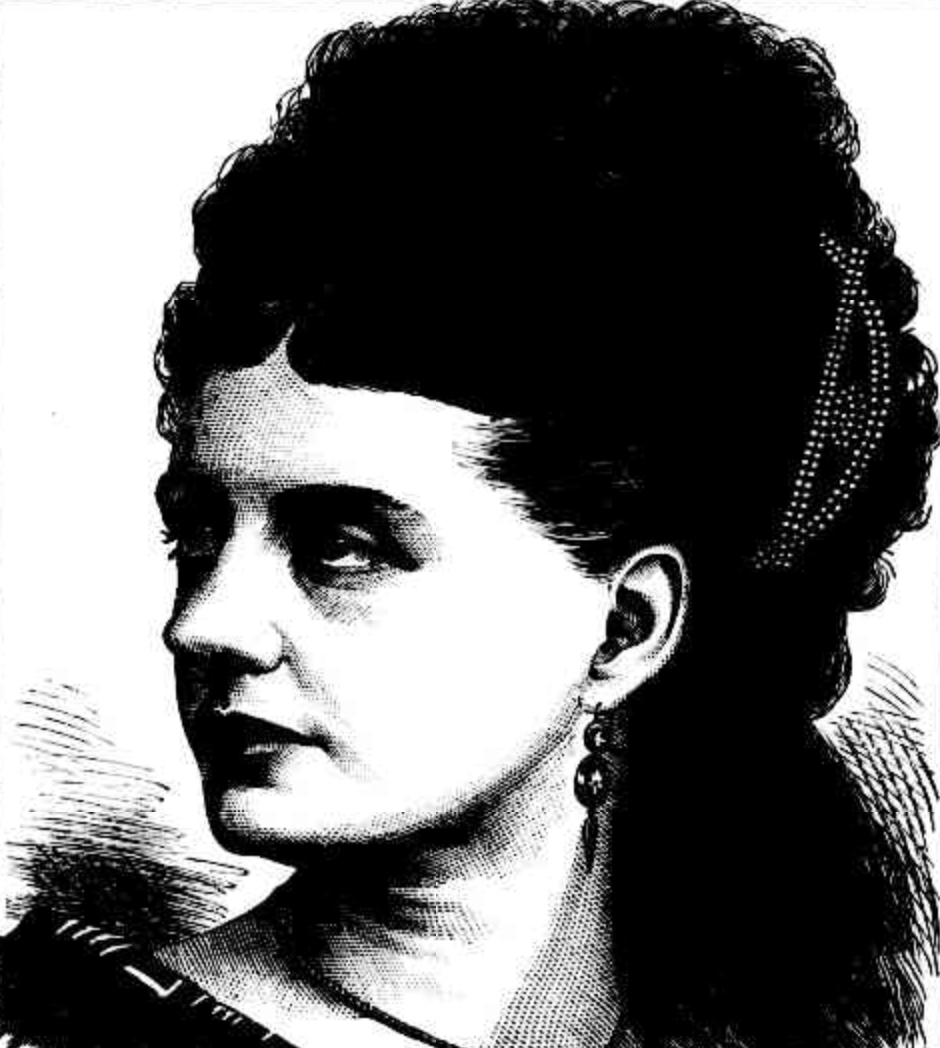
Hattie Shepparde

She married the English opera singer Henry Hallam on 8 November 1873, at St Jude's Church in Melbourne following which he returned to the Alice May Opera Company in New Zealand while she took up a six-month engagement at the Royal Victoria Theatre in Sydney. She went to her mother's house in Melbourne a month before her confinement to give birth to their daughter, Hattie Cynisca Bella Shepparde Hallam, but she died of peritonitis following childbirth on 22 September 1874. Her funeral on 25 September caused something of a sensation partly because of the 12 female pallbearers, who were mostly Shepparde's fellow actresses. Such was her fame and popularity at this time that during the burial service at Melbourne General Cemetery there were riots by her female admirers when "a large concourse of people most rudely pushed their way amongst the mourners, jostling them right and left, so as to catch a glimpse of the coffin... and ‘the pall-bearers, who had followed their friend and companion to her last resting place, were rudely thrust on one side that a number of idle women might secure a position to gratify their curiosity.'

Shepparde's mother died less than a month later and was buried in the same grave, while her daughter died in March 1875 and was buried with her mother and grandmother.
