= Listed buildings in Cononley =

Cononley is a civil parish in the county of North Yorkshire, England. It contains 28 listed buildings that are recorded in the National Heritage List for England. All the listed buildings are designated at Grade II, the lowest of the three grades, which is applied to "buildings of national importance and special interest". The parish contains the village of Cononley and the surrounding countryside. To the southwest of the village is the former Cononley Lead Mine, which contains surviving structures that are listed. Most of the other listed buildings are houses, cottages and associated structures, farmhouses and farm buildings, and the others include a public house and a milestone.

== Buildings ==
Name and location	Photograph	Date	Notes
Cononley Hall; 53.91858°N 2.01874°W		Late 16th or early 17th century	The manor house, later extended and divided, is in stone with quoins and stone slate roofs. The original part has coped gables and kneelers. There are three storeys, and the windows have chamfered surrounds and hood moulds. Most are replacements, but two windows have transoms. The later part has a hipped roof, a modillion cornice, three storeys and three bays. The windows are sashes in architraves. There is a Tuscan doorcase with engaged columns, a pediment and an arched doorway. The return has five bays, the central window of the middle floor with a pediment on consoles. In the wall is a re-set initialled and dated lintel.
Milton House; 53.91848°N 2.01669°W		1635	The house is in stone, with quoins, and a stone slate roof with coped gables, kneelers and elaborate finials. There are two storeys, a main block of three bays, and a recessed lower bay on the right. On the front are chamfered mullioned windows, with a continuous moulded hood mould over the ground floor openings. The lintel is inscribed with initials and the date.
Garden wall, Royd House; 53.909185°N 2.00529°W	—	1636	The garden wall incorporates items from the previous hall, now demolished. On the front facing the road are a Tudor-style doorway with an elaborate surround, and larger doorways with initials in the spandrels. In the south wall are two large double-chamfered mullioned and transomed windows with hood moulds, and two blocked doorways, one chamfered and the other with an architrave. The east wall contains a blocked chamfered doorway and three double-chamfered cross windows.
Bay House; 53.91907°N 2.01893°W	—	17th century	The house, at one time an inn, is in roughcast stone, and has a stone slate roof with a stone ridge, and kneelers to the right gable. There are two storeys and three bays. The windows are mullioned, some also chamfered, and some have hood moulds. The doorway has a plain surround.
Pear Tree Farmhouse; 53.91833°N 2.01541°W	—	1656 (probable)	The farmhouse is in stone with a stone slate roof. There are two storeys, a main block of two bays, a projecting cross-wing on the left, and a porch in the angle. The doorway in the right bay has a chamfered surround and a round head. The mullions have been removed from the ground floor windows, and above them are hood moulds. In the upper floor are two three-light double-chamfered mullioned windows, the lights and hood moulds with ogee heads. The cross-wing contains chamfered mullioned windows.
High Woodside Farmhouse; 53.92951°N 2.02403°W	—	Late 17th century (probable)	The farmhouse is in stone with quoins and a stone slate roof. There are two storeys and two bays. The doorway has monolithic jambs and a cambered head. The ground floor windows have umoulded surrounds, and in the upper floor and at the rear are chamfered mullioned windows.
Low Woodside Farmhouse; 53.93079°N 2.02264°W	—	Late 17th century	The farmhouse, which was refronted in the 19th century, is in stone with a stone slate roof. There are two storeys and two bays. The doorway and the windows on the front have plain surrounds. At the rear is a double-chamfered mullioned window, and in the right gable end is a blocked round-headed opening.
Shady Grove Farmhouse; 53.91920°N 2.01990°W	—	Late 17th century (probable)	Two houses, the left in dressed stone, the right in Tunbridge Wells sandstone, both with a stone slate roof and two storeys. The left house has one bay, and it contains a two-storey canted bay window and a doorway o the right. The right house has two bays and a recessed bay on the right. On the front and at the rear are mullioned windows. The doorway is in the recessed bay, it has a chamfered surround, and a lintel with initials and an indecipherable date.
Royd House Barn; 53.90941°N 2.00504°W	—	1678 (possible)	The barn is aisled and has five internal bays. It is in stone and has a stone slate roof. The aisle posts stand on high stone stylobates.
Peat Ghyll Head Farm; 53.92478°N 2.03881°W	—	1680	The farmhouse is in stone with a stone slate roof, two storeys and two bays. The windows on the front are casements with plain surrounds. To the left is a porch containing a doorway with a chamfered surround, a triangular head, massive jambs, and a decorated embattled lintel with initials, the date, stars and fleurs-de-lys, and swords in the spandrels. At the rear is a chamfered mullioned window.
92 Main Street; 53.91863°N 2.01790°W	—	Late 17th or early 18th century	The house is in stone with a stone slate roof, two storeys and one bay. It contains a doorway with a plain surround, two double-chamfered mullioned windows, and a small window with an unmoulded surround.
Aire View Farmhouse and barn 53.91616°N 2.01425°W	—	Late 17th or early 18th century	The house and barn are in one range, and are in stone with a stone slate roof, and two storeys. The house contains two chamfered mullioned windows, and the openings on the front date from the 19th century. The barn has a segmental-headed cart opening.
Barn north of 62 Main Street; 53.91857°N 2.01522°W	—	Late 17th or early 18th century (possible)	The barn is in stone with a stone slate roof. It contains many vents with round heads, particularly in the gable end facing the street.
Bradleys Farmhouse; 53.91811°N 2.01600°W		Late 17th or early 18th century (probable)	A farmhouse and a barn in one range, in stone, with a stone slate roof, and two storeys. The porch has a double-chamfered surround. The windows are mullioned, and two at the rear are double-chamfered with hood moulds.
Cross House; 53.91861°N 2.01754°W	—	Late 17th or early 18th century	The house is in stone with a stone slate roof, two storeys and two bays. In the ground floor are double-chamfered mullioned windows, the upper floor contains flush square mullioned windows, and the doorway has a plain surround.
Ghyll Farmhouse and Ghyll Farm Cottage; 53.91861°N 2.01926°W	—	Late 17th or early 18th century	The former farmhouse is in stone with a stone slate roof, two storeys and an outshut. It contains double-chamfered mullioned windows, with some mullions missing. In the outshut are two small chamfered openings.
New Inn; 53.91852°N 2.01730°W		17th or early 18th century	The public house is in pebbledashed stone and has a stone slate roof. There are two storeys, a main block, and a short cross-wing on the left. The doorway has a plain surround, the windows on the front are double-chamfered, with an almost continuous hood mould over the ground floor openings. At the rear is a double-chamfered mullioned window.
King's Farmhouse; 53.91802°N 2.01558°W	—	Early 18th century (probable)	The house is in stone with a stone slate roof and a stone ridge. It has two storeys and two bays. There are mullioned windows on the front and the right gable end, and at the rear is a mullioned and transomed window.
Scarcliffe Farmhouse; 53.92482°N 2.02633°W	—	Mid 18th century (probable)	The farmhouse and attached barn are in stone with quoins and a stone slate roof. There are two storeys and five bays. It contains a segmental-headed doorway, a cart entry, and mullioned windows.
Low Moor Top Farmhouse; 53.92306°N 2.03586°W	—	1762	The farmhouse is in stone with a stone slate roof, two storeys and two bays. The central doorway has a chamfered surround and stone slate hood, above which is an initialled and dated plaque. The windows are sashes.
Hall Croft; 53.91884°N 2.01833°W	—	Late 18th century	A stone house with quoins, and a stone slate roof with a stone ridge. There are two storeys and a symmetrical front of three bays. The central doorway has a plain surround and an open pediment on consoles projecting as a hood. The windows are recessed and mullioned.
Engine house, Cononley Mine; 53.91121°N 2.03276°W		c. 1842	The engine house serving the lead mine is in stone with some brick patching and quoins, and is roofless. There are two storeys and a rectangular plan. In the west gable end are two openings with pointed arches, voussoirs and keystones. The east gable end contains a doorway with a timber lintel and square openings, and there are other openings elsewhere, some blocked.
Engine house chimney, Cononley Mine; 53.91118°N 2.03247°W		c. 1842	The engine house and chimney served a lead mine. The chimney is in stone with a circular plan, it is tapering, and 50 feet (15 m) high. Near the top and about 12 feet (3.7 m) lower are moulded bands.
Magazine building, Cononley Mine; 53.91102°N 2.03081°W		c. 1842	The magazine building in the lead mine is in stone with quoins and a corrugated iron roof. There is a single storey and a square plan. Apart from a doorway and a square opening in the east gable end, all the walls are blank.
Portal to engine shaft, Cononley Mine; 53.91103°N 2.03173°W		c. 1842	The portal in the lead mine is in stone and is approached by dry stone walls which taper towards the entrance. The walls rise to form a barrel vault leading to a shaft.
Smithy, Cononley Mine; 53.91091°N 2.03246°W		c. 1842	The former smithy in the lead mine is in stone and without a roof. There is a square plan, a single storey and one bay. It contains a doorway with a plain lintel, and two blocked square openings.
Portal to inclined plan, Cononley Mine; 53.91083°N 2.03093°W		c. 1847	The portal leading to the inclined plane in the lead mine is in stone. Stone-lined walls lead down to a semicircular-headed portal with large voussoirs and a projecting keystone, which leads to a barrel vaulted tunnel.
Milestone; 53.91851°N 1.99764°W		19th century	The milepost is on the west side of Skipton Road (A629 road). It is in cast iron, and has a triangular plan and a semicircular head. On the head is inscribed "Keighley and Kendal Road" and "Farnhill", on the left sides are the distances to Skipton, Settle and Kendal, and on the right side the distance to Keighley.
