= New Inn, Cononley =

Listed pub in North Yorkshire, England

New Inn
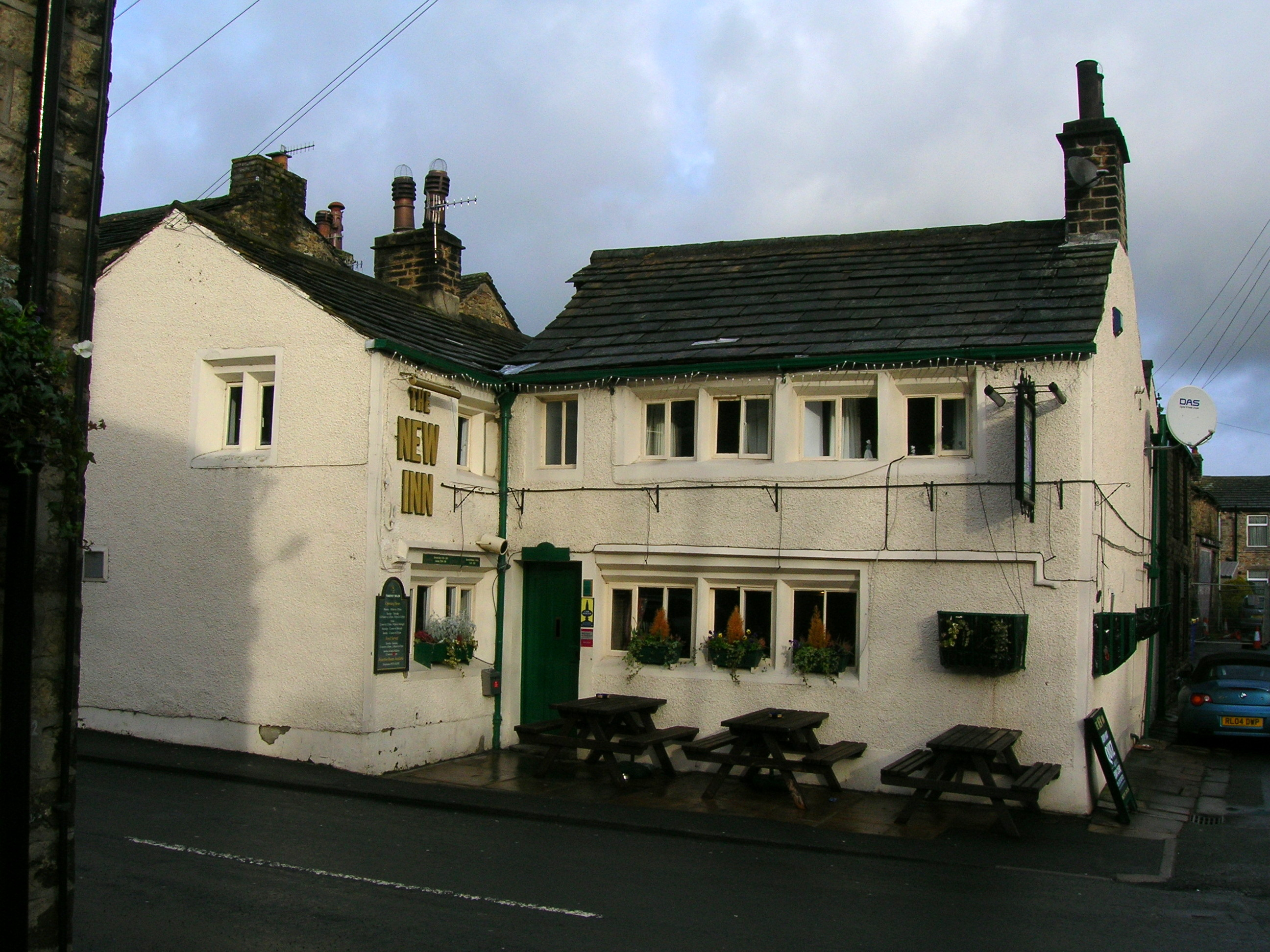
- The pub in 2012
- Interactive map of the New Inn area

General information
- Type: Public house
- Location: Main Street, Cononley, North Yorkshire, England
- Coordinates: 53.9185°N 2.0173°W
- Year built: 17th or early 18th century
- Renovated: 19th century (rear extended)
- Owner: Timothy Taylor's

Design and construction
- Designations

Listed Building – Grade II
- Official name: New Inn
- Designated: 23 October 1984
- Reference no.: 1316968

Website
- Official website

The New Inn is a public house on Main Street in Cononley, a village in North Yorkshire, England.

The building was constructed in the 17th or early 18th century, and it was extended to the rear in the 19th century. It was Grade II listed in 1984. As of 2013, the pub hosted quiz nights and live bands. In 2019, it began temporarily offering a post office service for three hours every Thursday. As of October 2026, the freehold is owned by Timothy Taylor's.

The building is constructed of pebbledashed stone and has a stone slate roof. It has two storeys, a main block, and a short cross-wing on the left. The doorway has a plain surround, the windows on the front are double-chamfered, with an almost continuous hood mould over the ground floor openings. At the rear is a double-chamfered mullioned window.

== See also ==
- Listed buildings in Cononley
