= Cononley Mine =

Disused lead mine in North Yorkshire, England

Coordinates: 53.9112°N 2.0327°W

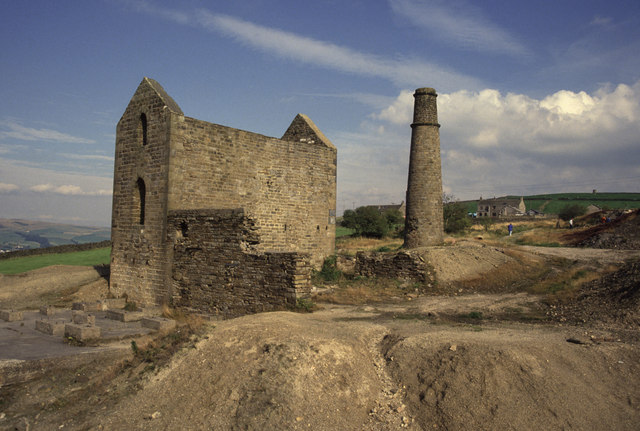
The engine house

Cononley Mine is a former lead mine in Cononley, a village in North Yorkshire, in England.

Lead mining has taken place in Cononley on a small scale since the Mediaeval period. In about 1842, the area of the small mines was leased by the Duke of Devonshire, and developed as a single, larger mine. Several buildings survive from this period, including the engine house and chimney, gunpowder magazine, and forge, each of which are Grade II listed. In 1848 or 1849 an inclined plane was constructed, enabling a steam engine to haul ore and waste directly out of the mine. Production peaked at 804 tons in 1850. The mine was repeatedly extended, but production fell steadily, and was negligible after 1870. The mine was put up for sale in 1878, but there was no interest. The mine appears to have closed in 1882, but it reopened in 1919, work focusing on extracting baryte from waste tips. The last mining took place in 1958, while a plan to reopen the mine in 1982 was abandoned after it was discovered the workings were in worse condition than expected. A 1985 proposal to remove the waste tips to work through elsewhere was also abandoned, in the face of local opposition.

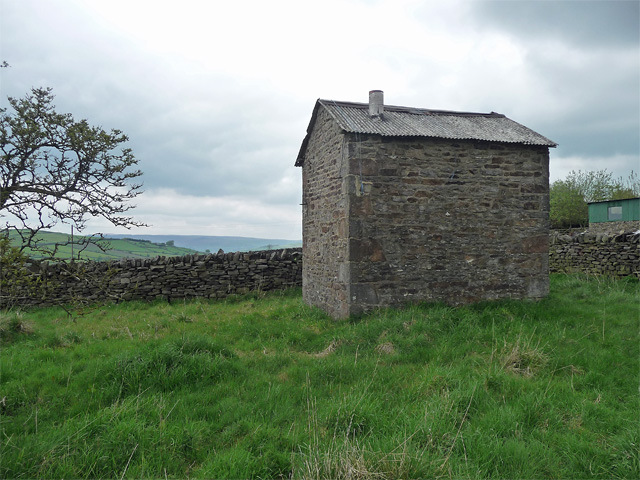
The magazine building

The engine house is built of stone with some brick patching and quoins, and is roofless. There are two storeys and a rectangular plan. In the west gable end are two openings with pointed arches, voussoirs and keystones. The east gable end contains a doorway with a timber lintel and square openings, and there are other openings elsewhere, some blocked. The detached chimney is in stone with a tapering circular plan, and is 50 feet (15 m) high. Near the top and about 12 feet (3.7 m) lower are moulded bands. The magazine building is in stone with quoins and a corrugated iron roof. It has a single storey and a square plan. Apart from a doorway and a square opening in the east gable end, all the walls are blank. The former forge is also built of stone and is roofless. It has a square plan, a single storey and one bay. It contains a doorway with a plain lintel, and two blocked square openings.

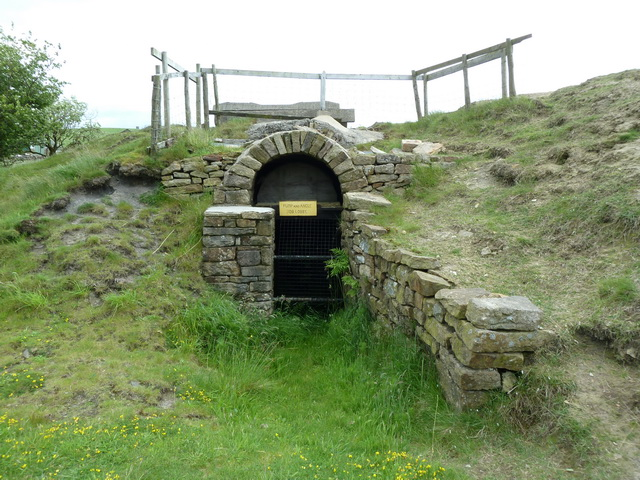
Portal to the engine shaft

In addition to the buildings, the portal to the engine shaft survives, built of stone and approached by dry stone walls which taper towards the entrance. The walls rise to form a barrel vault leading to the shaft. The portal leading to the inclined plane is also built of stone. Stone-lined walls lead down to a semicircular-headed portal with large voussoirs and a projecting keystone, which leads to another barrel vaulted tunnel.

== See also ==
- Listed buildings in Cononley
