= St Jude's Church, Carlton =

St Jude's Anglican Church
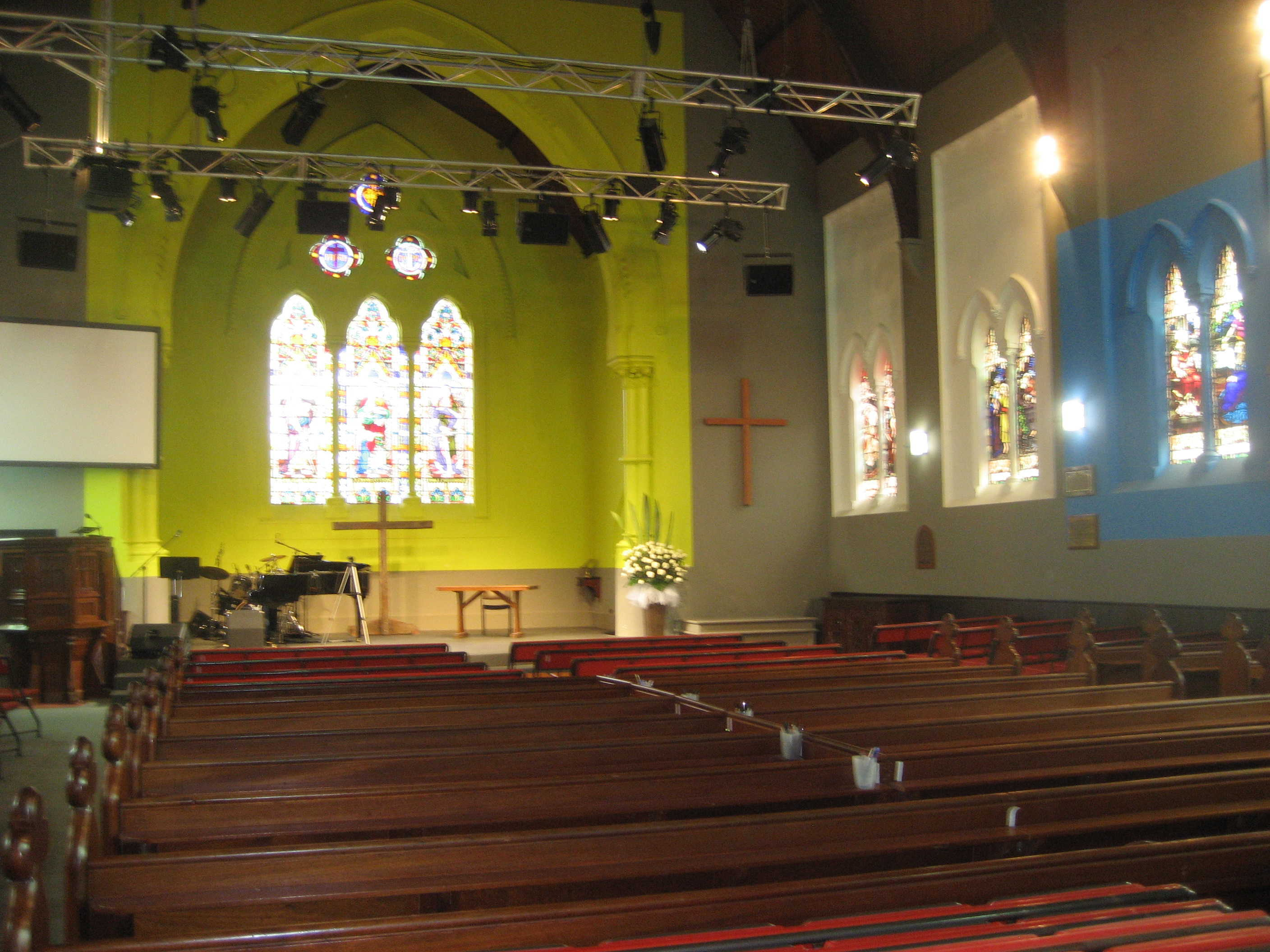
- Former interior of St Jude's, 2011
- St Jude's Anglican Church
- 37.7964°S 144.967°E
- Location: Carlton, Victoria,
- Country: Australia
- Denomination: Anglican
- Churchmanship: Evangelical Anglicanism
- Website: stjudes.org.au

History
- Dedicated: 1866

Architecture
- Heritage designation: The site is listed on the Victorian Heritage Register

Clergy
- Vicar: Rev. John Forsyth

St Jude's Anglican Church is an Australian Anglican parish church in the Melbourne suburb of Carlton. It is one of the first complete polychromatic brick churches built in the country. The church was opened in 1866 as a temporary wooden building, but was rebuilt as a Gothic-polychrome building between 1866 and 1874. It was rebuilt–completed in 2019–after a fire in 2014.

The church has five separate congregations meeting at differing times and locations.

St Jude's Carlton is linked to St Jude's Church, Hartwith, which was dedicated to St Jude after refurbishment in 1891 at the request of parishioners who had emigrated to Australia and worshipped at St Jude's Carlton near Melbourne.

The site is listed on the Victorian Heritage Register.

== Pipe organ ==
The building contains an intact early pipe organ installed in 1868 to the design of George Fincham, a leading 19th-century organ builder who arrived in Australia in 1852.

== Stained glass window ==
Melbourne's Argus newspaper, on 7 March 1892 reported, "A very fine stained glass window has been placed in St. Jude’s Church, Carlton, to the memory of John Richard Bathe Neale, Lygon Street, Carlton, by his parents, of Windsor. The subject is Christ at the Pool of Bethesda." The accompanying text is taken from John 5:8, "Jesus saith unto him, Rise, take up thy bed, and walk."

== 2014 fire ==
In October 2014, St Jude's was damaged by a deliberately lit fire. Prayers were offered for those who had set fire to the building. Repairs were estimated at $500,000.

== Reconstruction ==
Following the fire, the church building was reconstructed - completed in 2019. The renovations included reversing the direction of the interior layout of the church.

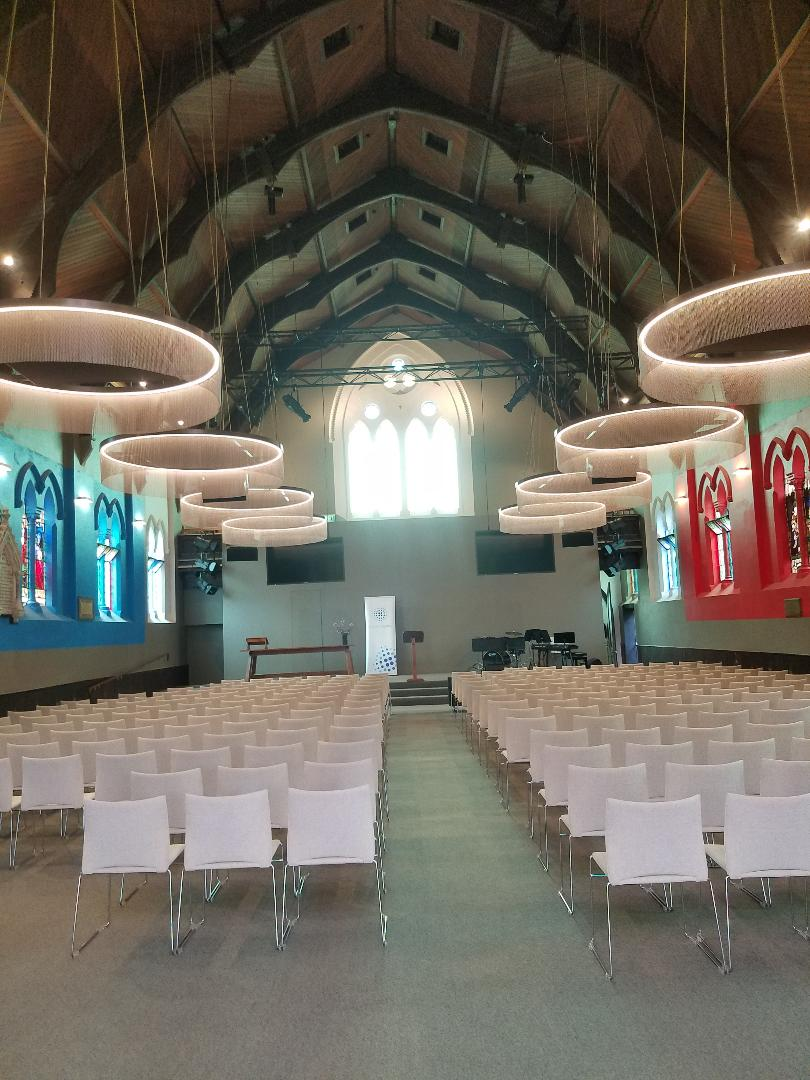
St Jude's 2019, looking east

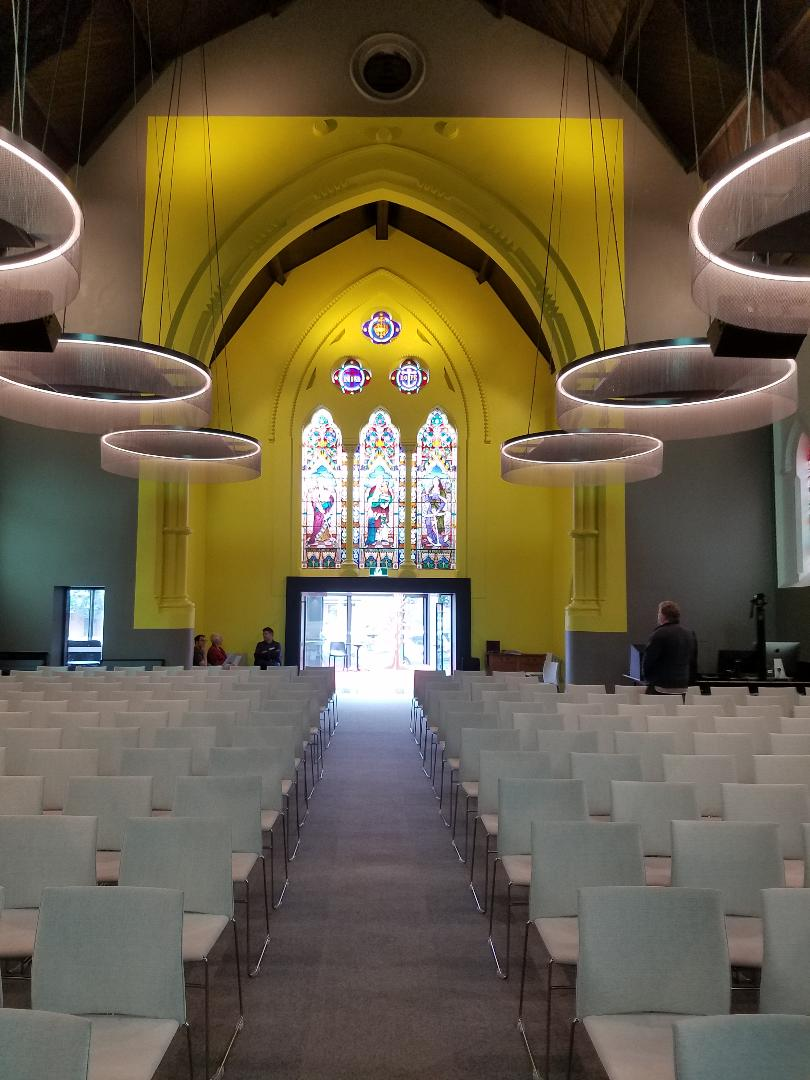
St Jude's 2019, looking west

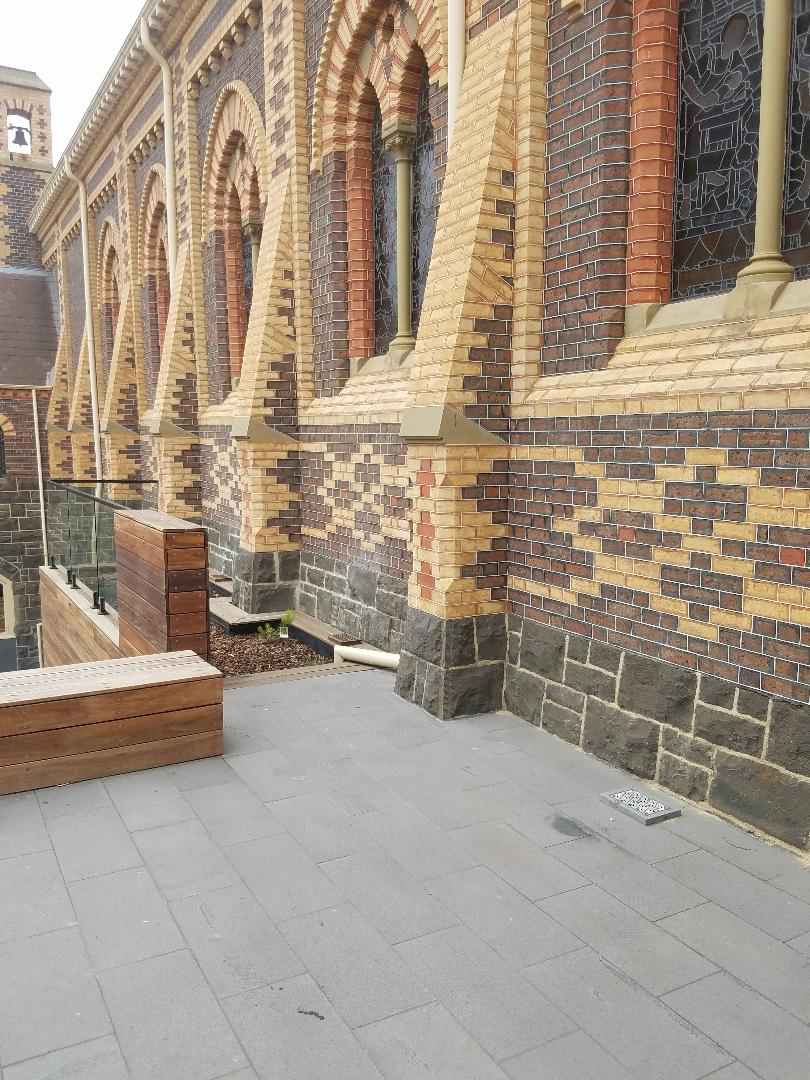
St Jude's 2019, north exterior wall

== Vicars ==
Peter Adam was vicar from 1982 to 2001. From 2002 to 2012, he was principal of Ridley College (Melbourne) after Leon Morris. From 2012, he was appointed as emeritus vicar.

In November 2015, Richard Condie the (then) vicar of St Jude's and Archdeacon of Melbourne, was appointed as Bishop of Tasmania.

In January 2017, the Reverend John Forsyth was appointed vicar.

== Other ==
The performers Henry Hallam and Hattie Shepparde were married here in 1873. The Australian rock band Skyhooks performed their first live show in the church's hall, supported by the band Scumbag, whose line-up included Red Symons who subsequently joined Skyhooks.

== See also ==
- Anglican Church of Australia
- Anglican Diocese of Melbourne
- Christianity in Australia
- Ridley College (Melbourne)
