= Listed buildings in Hartwith cum Winsley =

Hartwith cum Winsley is a civil parish in the county of North Yorkshire, England. It contains 58 listed buildings that are recorded in the National Heritage List for England. Of these, one is listed at Grade I, the highest of the three grades, one is at Grade II*, the middle grade, and the others are at Grade II, the lowest grade. The parish contains the village of Summerbridge, the smaller settlements of Low Laithe, New York, Brimham, Hartwith, and the eastern part of Smelthouses, and the surrounding countryside. Most of the listed buildings are houses, cottages and associated structures, farmhouses and farm buildings. The others include bridges, a church and a memorial in the churchyard, a former watermill, and a former mortuary.

== Key ==
Grade	Criteria
I	Buildings of exceptional interest, sometimes considered to be internationally important
II*	Particularly important buildings of more than special interest
II	Buildings of national importance and special interest

== Buildings ==
Name and location	Photograph	Date	Notes	Grade
Clough House; 54.05279°N 1.69041°W	—	1634	The house is in gritstone, and has a purple slate roof with stone gable copings and shaped kneelers. There are two storeys, a double depth plan and three bays. The central doorway has a lintel with a shallow Tudor arch, above which are initials and the date in relief. The windows are recessed, chamfered and mullioned, most with hood moulds.	II
Braisty Woods Farmhouse; 54.06866°N 1.70100°W		Early to mid 17th century	The farmhouse is in gritstone, with quoins, sill bands, an eaves band, and a stone slate roof with shaped kneelers and gable coping. There are two storeys and an attic, and an L-shaped plan, with a main range of four bays, and a two-bay projecting wing on the left. In the main range is a doorway with an architrave, fluted pilasters, a pulvinated frieze, an entablature and a cornice. The windows vary, and include sashes, recessed chamfered mullioned windows, and round-arched windows with imposts and keystones.	II
Mounting block with sundial south of Brimham Lodge; 54.06492°N 1.65456°W		17th century (probable)	The mounting block is in gritstone, and consists of three steps surrounding a platform about 2 metres (6 ft 7 in) wide and 1.2 metres (3 ft 11 in) high. In the centre of the platform is a sundial, consisting of a shaft chamfered to a square 1 metre (3 ft 3 in) high, with the gnomon missing.	II
Summer Bridge; 54.05636°N 1.69542°W		17th century (probable)	The bridge carries the B6451 road over the River Nidd, and was altered and widened in the 19th century. It is in gritstone and consists of two segmental arches. On the north face are voussoirs recessed under a band, and a large triangular cutwater rising as a pedestrian retreat at road level.	II
Swallow Cottage; 54.04650°N 1.66699°W		Mid 17th century	The house was extended to the left in the 18th century. It is in gritstone and has a stone slate roof. There are two storeys, three bays, and a single-storey bay on the left. The doorway has a stone surround and tie stones, and to the right is a blocked doorway with a quoined surround. The windows are recessed and mullioned, the mullions in the earlier part chamfered, and those in the later part flat-faced.	II
Brimham Lodge; 54.06514°N 1.65446°W		1661	The house is in gritstone, and has a blue slate roof with moulded kneelers, splayed coping and bulbous finials. There are two storeys and attics, five bays, and a rear staircase wing. The central doorway has a chamfered moulded surround of large blocks, and a lintel with an enriched ogee arch. Above it is a large initialled and dated block and a single-light window. Elsewhere on the front are recessed chamfered mullioned windows with up to six lights and continuous hood moulds over the lower two floors. In the rear wing is a three-light mullioned and transomed stair window.	I
Outbuilding northeast of Brimham Hall; 54.06223°N 1.66287°W	—	Mid to late 17th century	A cottage, later an outbuilding, in gritstone, with quoins, and a stone slate roof with shaped kneelers and gable coping. There are two storeys and two bays. In the ground floor are two square windows, the upper floor contains two two-light recessed chamfered mullioned windows, and in the left return is a blocked upper floor doorway.	II
Hardcastle Garth; 54.03959°N 1.65585°W		1666	A house to which a cross wing was added in 1703, forming an L-shaped plan, and later two houses. It is in gritstone on a plinth, with quoins, and two storeys, and each range has three bays. The north range contains a doorway with a moulded quoined surround and a lintel with a shallow Tudor arch containing a date and initials, The west range has a doorway with a pointed arch, moulded jambs, and an initialled and dated lintel. The windows in both ranges are mullioned, those in the ground floor with hood moulds.	II
Manor House Farmhouse; 54.04056°N 1.69138°W	—	c. 1670 (probable)	The house is in gritstone, with the porch added in 1696, it is on a plinth, and has quoins, and a blue slate roof with shaped kneelers and gable copings. There are two storeys and three bays, and it has a two-storey porch containing a doorway in an eared architrave, with a lintel containing dated and initialled panels, above which is a wheel window. The other windows are recessed, chamfered and mullioned with three lights.	II
Birchfield Farmhouse and wall 54.03525°N 1.67765°W	—	Late 17th century (probable)	The farmhouse is in gritstone, with quoins, and a blue slate roof with two courses of stone slate, shaped kneelers and coped gables. There are two storeys and three bays. The doorway has an alternate quoined surround and possibly a dated lintel, and the windows are sashes, those in the upper floor horizontally-sliding . The garden wall is in stone with triangular coping, it is ramped up twice, and extends for about 30 metres (98 ft).	II
Outbuilding north of Brimham Lodge; 54.06552°N 1.65473°W	—	Late 17th century	The outbuilding is in gritstone, with quoins, and a stone slate roof with shaped kneelers and gable coping. There are two storeys and two bays. In the centre is a stable door with a chamfered quoined surround, and a large lintel with a shallow four-centred arch. To the right is another doorway, and on the left stone steps lead up to a doorway with a quoined surround. The windows are recessed, chamfered and mullioned.	II
Walls and gates, Brimham Lodge; 54.06495°N 1.65435°W	—	Late 17th century	The front garden wall is in gritstone with ridged coping, and is between 2 metres (6 ft 7 in) and 1 metre (3 ft 3 in) high. At the north end of the west wall is a gateway with chamfered quoined jambs, and a lintel with a shallow four-centred arch and hollow moulding. In the centre of the south wall is a gateway with stone piers about 1.5 metres (4 ft 11 in) high with ball finials.	II
Low Stripe Farmhouse and barn 54.04456°N 1.66183°W		Late 17th century	The house, and the barn which dates from 1736, are in gritstone, and have a stone slate roof with shaped kneelers and gable coping. The house has quoins, two storeys, three bays, and a rear dairy wing. The doorway has a lintel with a shallow Tudor arch, some of the windows have a single light, and the others are mullioned with casements. The barn to the left has a segmental-arched cart entrance and a dated and initialled keystone, a blocked byre door, and a three-light mullioned window.	II
Dowgill Farmhouse; 54.04624°N 1.68939°W	—	1678	The farmhouse, which incorporates earlier material, is in gritstone with quoins and a stone slate roof. There are two storeys, a main range with two bays, and an earlier two-storey bay to the right. In the centre of the main block is a doorway that has a lintel with a four-centred arch and a recessed initialled and dated panel, and above it is a sundial. In the right bay is a doorway that has a large lintel with a wavy chamfer. The windows are mullioned, those in the upper floor with round-arched lights and ball ornament in the spandrels.. At the rear is a transomed stair window.	II
Prospect House; 54.05046°N 1.67438°W	—	Late 17th to early 18th century	The house is in gritstone, with quoins, and a stone slate roof with bulbous kneelers and gable coping. There are two storeys, three bays, and a lower two-storey bay on the left. The central doorway has a chamfered quoined surround, a deep lintel, and a single-slab hood on console brackets. Above the doorway is a single light window, and elsewhere are three-light mullioned windows. The left bay has a porch, and external steps to an upper floor doorway.	II
School House; 54.05105°N 1.67147°W	—	Late 17th to early 18th century	The house is in gritstone with a stone slate roof. There are two storeys and three bays, and a single-storey bay on the right with a purple slate roof. The doorway has a moulded surround, a deep lintel with a Tudor arch, and a hood of three stone slabs. One window is recessed with chamfered mullions and three lights, and the mullions have been removed from the other windows. The right bay contains a doorway with a quoined surround and a small window.	II
Well House; 54.05238°N 1.64095°W		Late 17th to early 18th century	The house is in gritstone, and has a purple slate roof with bulbous kneelers and gable coping. There are two storeys and four bays. On the front is a gabled porch containing a doorway with chamfered jambs, and a lintel with an embattled pattern. Throughout there are recessed chamfered mullioned windows.	II
Farm building south of Throstle Nest; 54.03742°N 1.68602°W	—	1701	The farm building is in gritstone with quoins and a stone slate roof. There are two storeys and two bays. On the right is a stable door with alternate quoined jambs, and a large lintel with a scalloped chamfer, under a rectangular panel with the date and an inscription, and external triangles. To the left is a single-light window with a chamfered surround, in the left return is a casement window, and on the right return, external steps lead up to a doorway with a deep scallop-chamfered lintel.	II
Sundial north of Braisty Woods Farmhouse; 54.06884°N 1.70086°W	—	1706	The sundial in the garden is in gritstone and about 1.2 metres (3 ft 11 in) high. It has a circular base, and a fluted shaft with moulding at the base and the cap. On the top is an inscribed bronze plate with a sun face, and the gnomon is intact.	II
Dougill Hall; 54.04886°N 1.68953°W		1722	The house is in gritstone, with a deep moulded eaves cornice and a blocking course with panels, and a stone slate M-shaped roof with stone coping. There are three storeys, a double depth plan, five bays, and a two-storey two-bay rear service wing. The central doorway has an eared and shouldered architrave, a dated and initialled lintel and a cornice. On the front, the lower two storeys contain cross windows, each with a moulded architrave, a pulvinated frieze and a cornice, and in the top floor are two-light mullioned windows with architraves and keystones. At the rear are recessed chamfered mullioned windows, and shaped kneelers.	II*
Sundial south of Dougill Hall; 54.04874°N 1.68965°W	—	c. 1722	The sundial in the garden is in gritstone, and about 1.2 metres (3 ft 11 in) high. It has a square base, a cylindrical shaft with a circular foot, a moulded cap, and a square dial. On the top is a bronze plate, covered by a later plate and a gnomon.	II
Walls, gates and gate piers, Doughill Hall; 54.04862°N 1.68959°W	—	1722 (probable)	The garden to the south of the house is enclosed by gritstone wall with moulded coping. In the centre of the south wall is a gateway flanked by piers about 2.5 metres (8 ft 2 in) high, with moulded chamfers, a deep cornice and pyramidal finials, and the gates are in wrought iron. To the north of the house is a curving wall about 1.2 metres (3 ft 11 in) high containing gate piers with faceted finials.	II
Spring House; 54.05364°N 1.65629°W	—	1725	The house, which contains remains of a house dated 1699, is in gritstone on a plinth, with quoins, and a purple slate roof with courses of stone slates, shaped kneelers and stone coped gables. There are two storeys and attics, a main range of five bays, and a lower two-storey two-bay range at right angles on the left. The central doorway has an eared architrave with a lettered plaque, and a cornice. Some windows are sshes in architraves, and others are mullioned with two lights. The lower range has a doorway with a quoined surround and a dated lintel.	II
Farm building southwest of Dougill Hall; 54.04863°N 1.69087°W	—	1733	The building consists of a cart shed and byre with a hayloft above. It is in gritstone, with quoins, and a stone slate roof with bulbous kneelers and stone gable coping. There are two storeys and three or four bays. In the east front are two tall loading doors, and the left return contains a tall round arch with a wide pitching opening above. In the right return are byre doors with quoined surrounds, and above is a window with a chamfered surround and a datestone below.	II
Barn and byres northeast of Birchfield Farmhouse; 54.03567°N 1.67704°W	—	Early to mid 18th century	The barn and byre are in gritstone, and have a stone slate roof with shaped kneelers and gable coping, and five bays. They contain cart entrances, each with a segmental arch and a quoined surround, and a recessed chamfered mullioned window. In the right return is a chamfered round-arched opening.	II
Brimham Hall; 54.06210°N 1.66303°W		Early to mid 18th century	The house is in gritstone, with stone gutter brackets, and a stone slate roof with shaped kneelers and gable coping. There are two storeys, a double depth plan, and two bays. The doorway has a pedimented hood, the windows have three lights and flat-faced mullions, and at the rear is a large cross window.	II
Cow Close Farmhouse; 54.04750°N 1.66529°W	—	Early to mid 18th century	The house is in gritstone, and has a stone slate roof with shaped kneelers and gable coping. There are three storeys and three bays. On the front is a porch, the window have flat-faced mullions, and at the rear is a blocked stair window.	II
Garden wall, Spring House; 54.05341°N 1.65637°W	—	Early to mid 18th century	The wall encloses the garden and part of a yard, and is in gritstone with rounded coping. In the west wall are two gateways that have lintels with stepped chamfer.	II
Gate piers east of Spring House; 54.05369°N 1.65604°W	—	Early to mid 18th century	A pair of gate piers in gritstone, about 2.5 metres (8 ft 2 in) high. Each pier is rebated on the inner face, and has a deep cornice and a ball finial.	II
Outbuildings and wall east of Spring House; 54.05364°N 1.65593°W	—	Early to mid 18th century	The stable range has two storeys and about five bays, and contains quoins, a central doorway with chamfered jambs and a lintel with stepped chamfer, a flight of steps leading to a doorway, and windows, one mullioned. To the right is a wall containing a doorway and a blocked feeding chute, and further to the right is a pigsty with a hen house above.	II
Outbuilding west of White Oak Farmhouse; 54.03520°N 1.67949°W	—	Early to mid 18th century	The outbuilding is in gritstone, with quoins, and a stone slate roof with bulbous kneelers and gable copings. There are two storeys and three bays. On the south front is a garage door and a small opening above. In the left return are two doorways with quoined surround, and a central doorway and pigeon openings above.	II
Well cover southeast of Birchfield Farmhouse; 54.03513°N 1.67714°W	—	Mid 18th century (or earlier)	The well cover is in stone with a square plan, and is about 2 metres (6 ft 7 in) high. The entrance is on the south side, and it has a lintel with the remains of an inscription, and pyramidal capping with the remains of an elaborate moulded finial.	II
Barn and byre range, Brimham Hall; 54.06248°N 1.66316°W	—	Mid 18th century	The barn and byre, which incorporate 16th-century architectural fragments, are in gritstone with stone slate roofs, and form an L-shaped plan. The barn on the north contains opposing cart entrances and a doorway with a moulded surround and a four-centred arched head. In the walls are fragments, some with inscriptions. The byre on the west has openings with sandstone surrounds.	II
Barn and byre west of Dougill Hall; 54.04879°N 1.69076°W	—	Mid 18th century	The farm buildings are in gritstone, with quoins, a corrugated asbestos roof, and four bays. On the front is a cart entrance with a segmental arch and a quoined surround, and two byre doors, and at the rear is a narrow doorway with a segmental arch and a quoined surround.	II
Barn east of Manor House; 54.04062°N 1.69105°W	—	18th century (probable)	The farm buildings are in gritstone, with quoins, and a stone slate roof with a bulbous kneeler and gable coping on the left, and probably six bays. They contain a segmental-arched cart entrance with chamfered quoined jambs, and a doorway with a re-set ogee-chamfered lintel with traces of an inscription, and above is a pitching door. In the left return is a doorway with a re-set ogee-chamfered lintel dated 1670.	II
Barn west of Well House; 54.05244°N 1.64131°W		Mid 18th century	The barn is in gritstone on a plinth, with quoins, and a slate roof with bulbous kneelers and gable coping. There are five bays and a rear two-bay outshut. On the front is a segmental-arched cart entrance and vents, and in each return is a doorway with a quoined surround.	II
Outbuilding west of Well House; 54.05253°N 1.64157°W	—	Mid 18th century	A row of four loose boxes in gritstone, with a roof of pantile and corrugated asbestos, with bulbous kneelers and gable coping. There is a single storey and about eight bays. On the front are four doorways with quoined surrounds, and in the left return are three vents.	II
Woolwich Farmhouse; 54.06598°N 1.69231°W		Mid 18th century	The house and attached outbuilding, later incorporated into the house, are on a plinth, with quoins, and a stone slate roof with shaped kneelers and gable copings. There are two storeys, the house has two bays, the former outbuilding to the right has two bays, and further to the right is a lean-to outbuilding. In the centre of the house is a gabled porch containing a stone bench, and a doorway with a quoined surround, and the windows are mullioned. The outbuilding has a doorway with a quoined surround, inserted windows, and a staircase leading to an upper floor doorway.	II
St Jude's Church; 54.05086°N 1.67144°W		1751	The chancel, porch and bellcote were added to the church in 1875. It is built in gritstone with a stone slate roof, and consists of a nave, a south porch and a chancel. On the west gable is a gabled bellcote, and the windows have pointed heads, those in the porch and chancel with hood moulds.	II
Outbuildings southwest of Dowgill Farmhouse; 54.04615°N 1.68966°W	—	Mid to late 18th century	A range containing a stable, a cart shed and hayloft, later used for other purposes, in gritstone, with quoins, and a stone slate roof with shaped kneelers and gable coping. There are five bays, and in the centre is a segmental-arched cart entrance with a keystone. It is flanked by a doorway with quoined jambs, and above are square openings. On the left return are stone steps with a kennel beneath, leading to a doorway with long and short quoins.	II
Low Barn west of Low Stripe Farm; 54.04452°N 1.66537°W		Mid to late 18th century	The barn is in gritstone with a stone slate roof, five bays and an aisle. On the north side is a cart entrance with a segmental arch, a quoined surround and a keystone, a square pitching hole, and vents. Elsewhere, there are byre doors and an owl hole.	II
Stable northeast of Well House; 54.05249°N 1.64111°W	—	Mid to late 18th century	The stable, with a hayloft above, is in gritstone, with quoins and a stone slate roof with shaped kneelers and gable coping. There are two storeys and five bays. In the centre is a doorway with a quoined surround, and an inscribed and dated lintel. On the left is a window, and in the upper floor is a square pitching hole, both with quoined jambs.	II
Barn southwest of White Oak Farmhouse; 54.03515°N 1.67998°W	—	Mid to late 18th century	The barn and byres are in gritstone, with quoins, and a stone slate roof with bulbous kneelers and gable coping. There are five bays and a rear outshut. In the centre is a cart entrance with a segmental arch and a keystone, and three pitching doors above. In the left return are doorways with long and short quoined surrounds.	II
Winsley Cottage; 54.04167°N 1.64486°W	—	Mid to late 18th century	The house is in gritstone, with quoins, stone gutter brackets, and stone slate roofs with shaped kneelers and gable copings. There are two storeys, a main block of three bays, and a rear wing, probably earlier, with three bays. On the front is a porch, and sash windows in eared architraves, and at the rear is a tall two-light staircase window with two transoms. The rear wing has a porch and contains three-light flat-faced mullioned windows.	II
Blacksmith's shop and pigsty, Birchfield Farm; 54.03550°N 1.67733°W	—	Late 18th century	The blacksmith's shop is in stone, with quoins, a stone slate roof, and two storeys. It contains doorways and windows, and on the north gable front is an external staircase. On the south gable are pigsties with two segmental arches, walls enclosing two pens, and three feeding troughs.	II
Smelthouses Bridge; 54.07407°N 1.70786°W	—	Late 18th century	The bridge carries a road over Fell Beck. It is in stone, and consists of a single large segmental arch flanked by pilasters. The bridge has a projecting band and plain coped parapets.	II
Summerbridge House, walls and railings 54.05660°N 1.69492°W		Late 18th century	The house is in stone, with eaves brackets, and stone slate roofs with coped gables and moulded kneelers. There are two storeys, a main range of three bays, and a two-bay rear wing on the right. In the centre of the front is a doorway with a flat hood on brackets, and on the right return is a doorway with a flat-roofed porch. The windows are sashes in both parts. Enclosing the garden is a low wall with chamfered coping, and ornate iron railings with a gate.	II
Barn south of Woolwich Farmhouse; 54.06534°N 1.69208°W		1784	The barn is in gritstone, with quoins, and a corrugated asbestos roof with bulbous kneelers and gable coping. It is a tall building with four bays. The cart entrance is in an external porch, and has a segmental arch and a dated and inscribed keystone. To the right is a byre door with quoined jambs, and there are round-headed slit vents, each with a block lintel.	II
Brimham House; 54.08094°N 1.68639°W		1792	The house was built for the caretaker of Brimham Rocks and later used for other purposes. It is in gritstone with rusticated banding on the front, quoins, and a stone slate roof with shaped kneelers and gable coping. There are two storeys, five bays and a rear outshut. The central doorway has a pitched hood on moulded brackets. The windows are horizontally-sliding sashes, those in the ground floor under round arches with keystones, and in the upper floor with round-arched heads and fanlights. On the left return is a three-sided bay.	II
Barn and byres east of Birchfield Farmhouse; 54.03542°N 1.67706°W	—	1796	The barn and byre are in gritstone, with quoins, and a stone slate roof with shaped kneelers and gable coping. The barn has five bays, and the byre with a hayloft above has two storeys and three bays. The barn has a segmental-arched head and quoined [[jamb]s, and above it is an initialled datestone. There are doorways and windows, including a two-light mullioned window. On the right return are external steps leading to a quoined doorway, and above it is an owl hole.	II
The Old Vicarage; 54.05150°N 1.67333°W	—	1798–1800	The vicarage, later a private house, is in gritstone, with quoins, and a stone slate roof with gable coping on the right. There are two storeys and three bays. In the centre is a porch, and a doorway with a fanlight and a hood on shaped console brackets. The windows are sashes. In the right return is an eaves band, and a semicircular recess in the gable.	II
Throstle Nest; 54.03761°N 1.68609°W	—	Late 18th to early century (probable)	A house, re-using 17th-century material, in gritstone, with quoins, and a stone slate roof with gable coping and moulded kneelers. There are two storeys and three bays, the left bay recessed, and a rear wing and outshut. In the centre is a two-storey gabled porch with a ball finial, the upper storey jettied. It contains a doorway with a moulded surround, and ogee decoration on the lintel, above which is a three-light stepped mullioned window. The outer bays contain mullioned windows.	II
Walbank mwemorial 54.05062°N 1.67126°W	—	1821	The memorial to Alice and Jonas Walbank is in the churchyard of St Jude's Church. It is in sandstone, and consists of an inscribed stone flanked by carved panels with fan and rosette motifs, and solid end and top panels. The memorial has fluted and moulded decoration and a deeply cut inscription.	II
Coach house west of Old Vicarage; 54.05151°N 1.67356°W	—	1832	The coach house is in gritstone with lintel and eaves bands, and a hipped stone slate roof. There are two storeys and three bays. On the front is an entrance with an elliptical head and stepped voussoirs, flanked by doorways. On the right, steps lead up to a hay loft, and in the upper floor are sash windows with eared lintels.	II
Hartwith Mill; 54.04127°N 1.65169°W		Early to mid 19th century	The mill, later a house, kiln and outbuildings, is in gritstone, with roofs of grey slate and stone slate, shaped kneelers and gable coping. The main block has a three-storey two-bay mill house, and a taller three-storey three-bay mill to the left. On the right is a later projecting house, and on the left is a projecting mill building. The mill house has a blocked cart entrance with a window inserted, and the windows in all parts are sashes. At right angles on the left is a covered waterwheel, and on the left return is an external staircase.	II
Knox Hall; 54.07083°N 1.71002°W		Early to mid 19th century	The house is in gritstone with a purple slate roof. There are two storeys and three bays, the outer bays projecting as semicircular wings with conical roofs. In the centre are three lancet window]]s in a bay window, and the other windows have pointed arches and cast iron small frames. At the rear is a lean-to porch and sash windows.	II
Former mortuary 54.06184°N 1.70126°W		Mid 19th century	The former mortuary is in sandstone, and consists of a small single-cell building built into a bank. On the front is an ornate pediment containing a roundel with a quatrefoil opening, on which are projecting blocks with the appearance of merlons. The central doorway has a rebated lintel and jambs.	II
White Oak Farmhouse; 54.03515°N 1.67925°W		19th century (possible)	The house, which incorporates 17th-century masonry, is in gritstone, and has a blue slate roof with gable copings, and shaped kneelers with cushions for ball finials. In the centre is a doorway with a fanlight, and a lintel cut to a shallow Tudor arch with coil decoration in the spandrels. Throughout are recessed chamfered mullioned windows, those in the upper floor stepped with three lights, and all have hood moulds. In the left return is a doorway with a quoined surround and a four-centred arch.	II
Outbuilding and cart shed northeast of Spring House; 54.05374°N 1.65621°W	—	1886	The buildings, re-using 17th-century material, are in gritstone, with quoins, one dated and initialled, and a stone slate roof. There are four bays, the south bay with two storeys, the rest open to the roof. The building has three cart entrances, one blocked, and the left bay contains a two-light recessed chamfered mullioned window in each floor.	II
