= Cononley Hall =

House in Cononley, North Yorkshire, England

Coordinates: 53°55′07″N 2°01′07″W

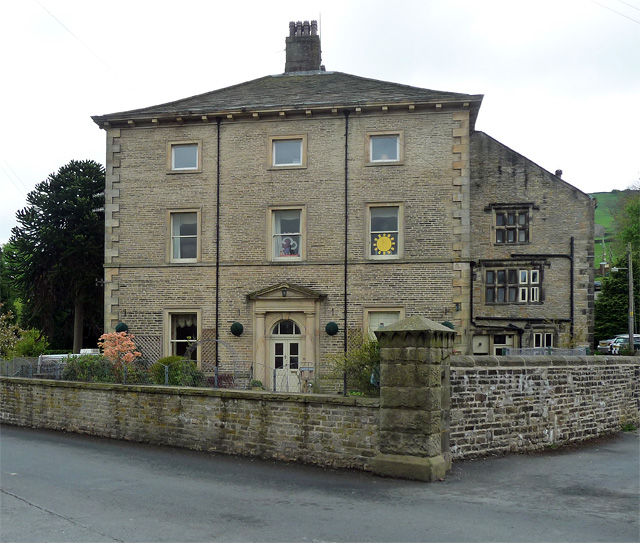
The building, in 2013

Cononley Hall is a historic building in Cononley, a village in North Yorkshire, in England.

Cononley Hall was first recorded in the 1540s, at which point it appears to have been a farmhouse. In about 1600, it was rebuilt as a manor house, part of which survives. By 1680, it was the home of the Swire family. In about 1770, the building was partly demolished and a large new extension was constructed. In the early 19th century, the Swires let out the hall, which served for periods as a boarding school. The Swire family sold the hall in 1837, and the building had a variety of owners until 1911, when it was divided into three properties. It has since been recombined, and operates as a bed and breakfast. It has been Grade II listed since 1954.

The house is built of stone with quoins and stone slate roofs. The original part has coped gables and kneelers. It has three storeys, and the windows have chamfered surrounds and hood moulds. Most are replacements, but two windows have transoms. The later part has a hipped roof, a modillion cornice, three storeys and three bays. The windows are sashes in architraves. There is a Tuscan doorcase with engaged columns, a pediment and an arched doorway. The return has five bays, the central window of the middle floor with a pediment on consoles. In the wall is a re-set initialled and dated lintel. Inside, there is an early fireplace, and a staircase contemporary with the late-18th century extension.

== See also ==
- Listed buildings in Cononley
