= Knox Mill =

Mill in Hartwith cum Winsley, North Yorkshire, England

Coordinates: 54°02′29″N 1°39′06″W

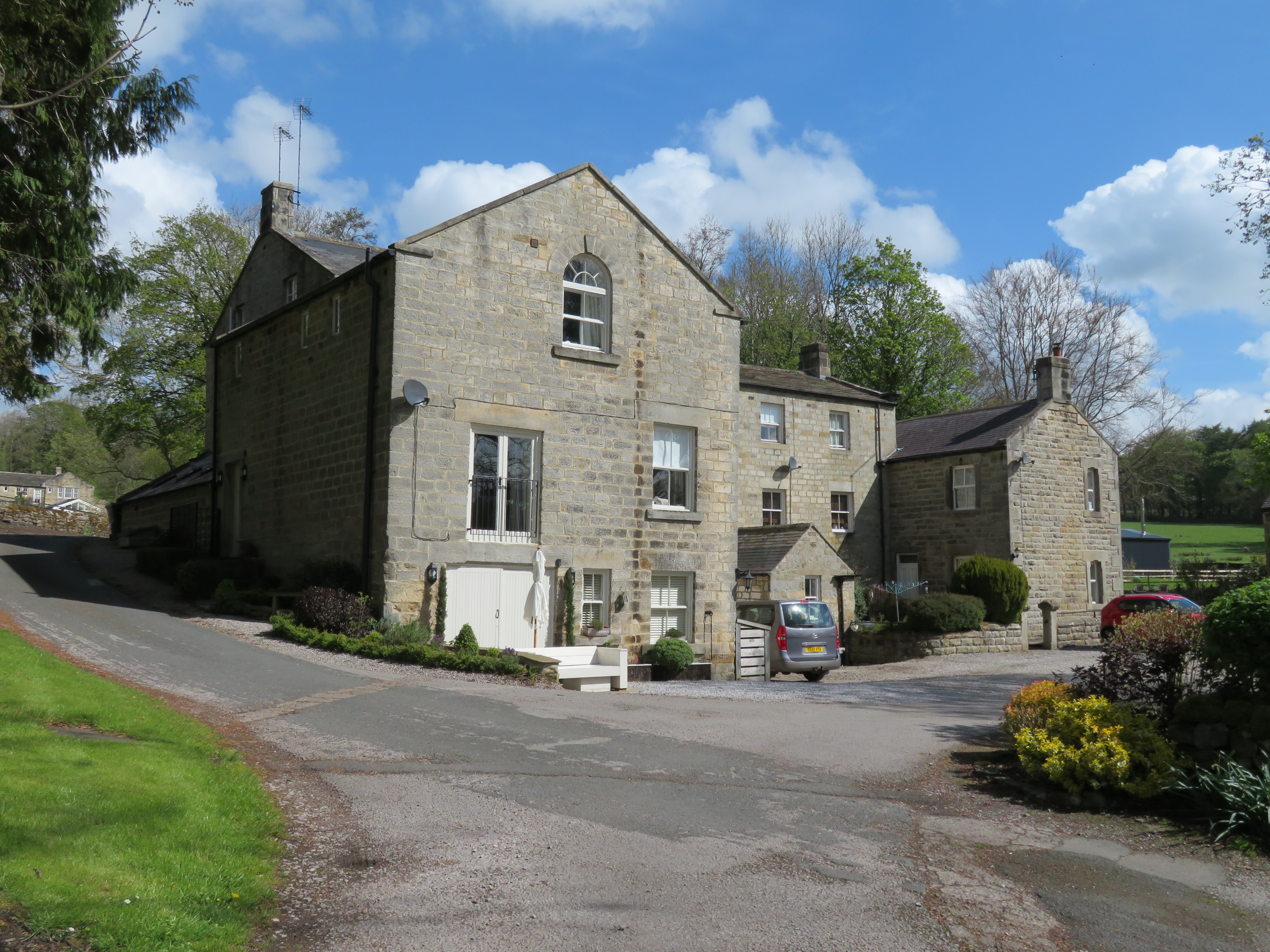
The mill, in 2021

Knox Mill, also known as Hartwith Mill, is a historic building in Hartwith cum Winsley, a village in North Yorkshire, in England.

The watermill was constructed in the early 19th century, to spin flax. Lewis's 1848 Topographical Dictionary refers to it as 'an extensive thread-mill'. Later in the century, a house was added to the right of the mill.

The mill was later converted to spin twine, and then in the 1920s it was used as a sawmill. It was later converted into housing. It was grade II listed in 1987, along with a kiln and outbuildings.

The mill is built of gritstone, with roofs of grey slate and stone slate, shaped kneelers and gable coping. The main block has a three-storey two-bay mill house, and a taller three-storey three-bay mill to the left. On the right is a later projecting house, and on the left is a projecting mill building. The mill house has a blocked cart entrance with a window inserted, and the windows in all parts are sashes. At right angles on the left is a covered waterwheel, and on the left return is an external staircase. Much of the Victorian machinery survives, including drive shafts and gearing.

== See also ==
- Listed buildings in Hartwith cum Winsley
