= Hartwith cum Winsley =

Civil parish in North Yorkshire, England

Coordinates: 54°3′30″N 1°40′30″W

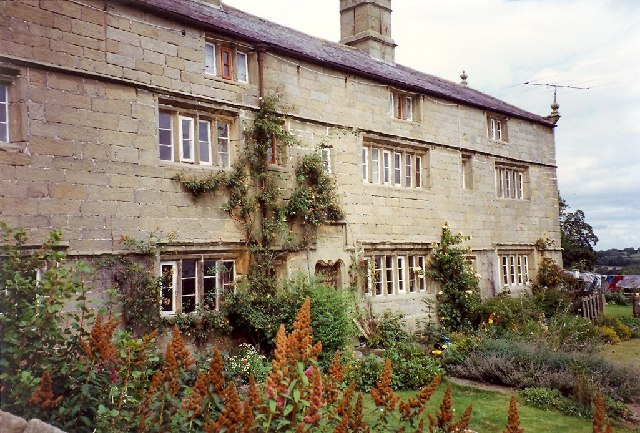
Brimham Lodge, Hartwith cum Winsley

Hartwith cum Winsley is a civil parish in the county of North Yorkshire, England. Historically it was a township in the ancient parish of Kirkby Malzeard in the West Riding of Yorkshire, a detached part of that parish. It became a separate civil parish in 1866, and was transferred to North Yorkshire in 1974. From 1974 to 2023 it was part of the Borough of Harrogate, it is now administered by the unitary North Yorkshire Council.

The main settlement in the parish is the village of Summerbridge. The parish also includes the hamlets of Low Laithe, New York, Brimham, Hartwith and the eastern part of Smelthouses. Winsley consists of some scattered houses and farms in the east of the parish. In 2015 the population of the parish was estimated at 1,020.

The parish occupies the north side of lower Nidderdale. In the north of the parish are Brimham Rocks.

== History ==
In the Middle Ages, Hartwith cum Winsley (then known as Brimham) formed part of the lands of Fountains Abbey, which established granges at Wise Ing (near Smelthouses), Braisty Woods, Brimham Grange and Brimham Park. At Brimham Grange there was a chapel, where local recusants kept a Catholic priest in the late 16th century.

In the 18th century Brimham Hall was built on the site of Brimham Grange and is now a Grade II listed building.

Brimham Park was used by the abbots as a hunting lodge. It was replaced in 1661 by a substantial house now known as Brimham Lodge, which is a Grade I listed building.

== Church ==
St Jude's Church, Hartwith was originally built in 1751 as a chapel-of-ease, to save the inhabitants the 12 mile journey to their then parish church at Kirkby Malzeard. It became the parish church in 1891. It was then dedicated to St Jude at the request of former parishioners who had emigrated to Australia and attended St Jude's Church, Carlton in Melbourne. It is a Grade II listed building.

== See also ==
- Listed buildings in Hartwith cum Winsley
