= St Jude's Church, Hartwith =

Church in North Yorkshire, England

Coordinates: 54°03′03″N 1°40′17″W

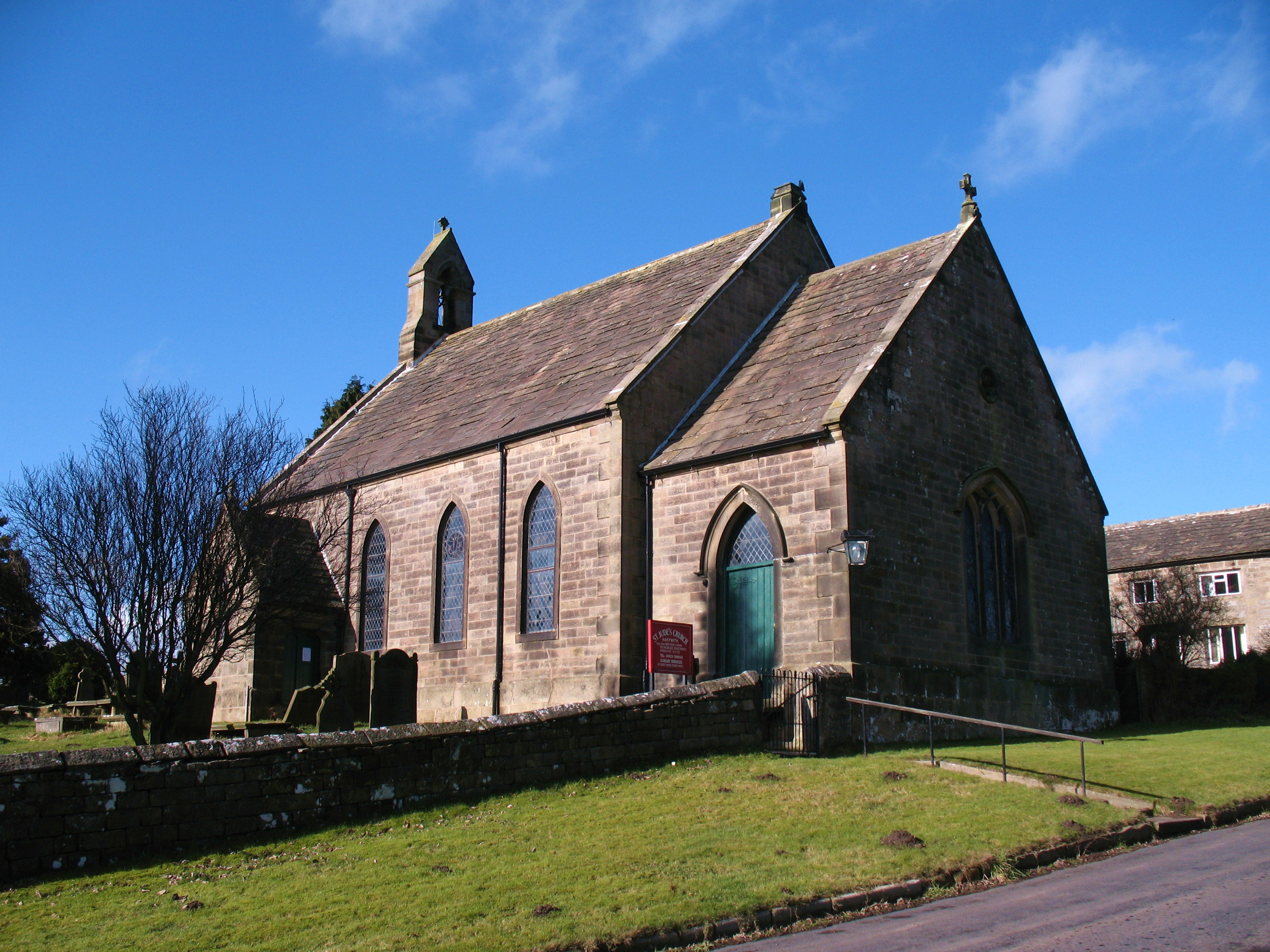
The church, in 2011

St Jude's Church is an Anglican church in Hartwith cum Winsley, a village in North Yorkshire, in England.

The church was built in 1751, as a chapel of ease to St Andrew's Church, Kirkby Malzeard. It was extended to the east in 1830, with a vestry and sexton's room also added. It was given its own parish in 1861. In 1878, the interior was refurbished, a chancel arch inserted, and a porch and bellcote added. It was dedicated to Saint Jude in 1891. The building was grade II listed in 1987.

The church is built of gritstone with a stone slate roof, and consists of a nave, a south porch and a chancel. On the west gable is a gabled bellcote, and the windows have pointed heads, those in the porch and chancel with hood moulds.

== See also ==
- Listed buildings in Hartwith cum Winsley
