= Horace Mills, Cononley =

Textile mill in Cononley, North Yorkshire, England

Coordinates: 53.9178°N 2.0113°W

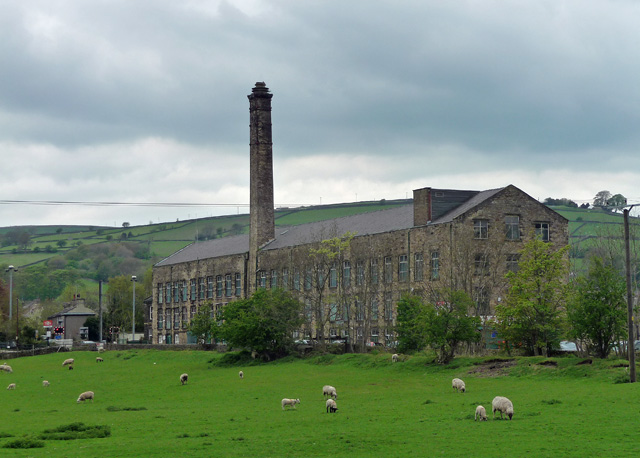
The building in 2013

Horace Mills is a former textile mill in Cononley, a village in North Yorkshire, in England.

In 1837, two separately owned textile mills were built close together and in parallel, by the River Aire. They became known as the High Mill and Low Mill. The Low Mill was divided into two sections, each undertaking weaving, while the High Mill was a single operation, and undertook both spinning and weaving. The 1841 census recorded that around 500 people, three-quarters of the Cononley workforce, were working in the textile industry. From 1852, the two mills were under common ownership, although Low Mill was later demolished. In 1866, a further mill, the Aireside or New Mill, was constructed on the other side of the Aire, and in 1880, this mill was purchased by the owner of the High Mill, which later became known as Station Mill. Despite these changes, by 1881, the proportion of textile workers had declined to under one half of those employed in Cononley.

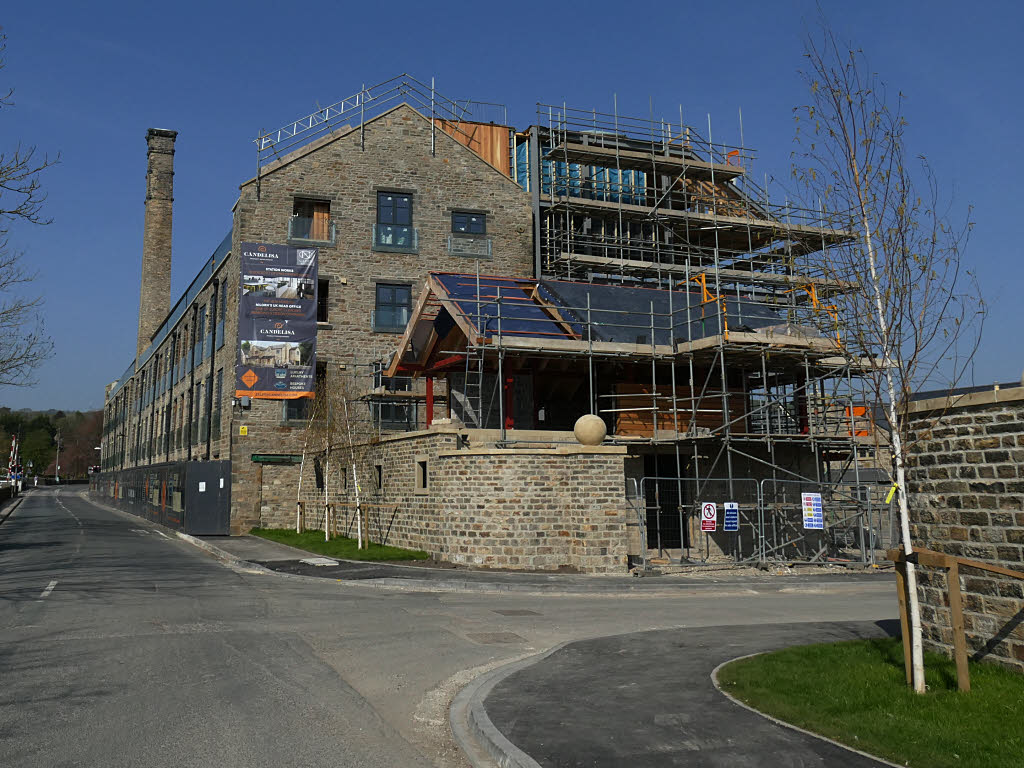
Conversion work on the mill in 2019

In 1905, Station Mill was purchased by Peter Green & Co, which continued to produce textiles. In 1910, the company partly rebuilt the mill, adding a fourth floor, and possibly reconstructing the north wall, with larger windows. The southern part of the mill was given over to the production of motors, under the direction of Peter Green's son, Horace. The site was steadily expanded over the following decades, and during World War II, it produced high frequency alternators for ADSIC. The company closed in 1997. Meanwhile, the larger part of the Aireside Mill was destroyed in a fire in 1992, the remaining single-storey section becoming a business park.

Following the closure of Peter Green, Station Mill stood derelict for several years. It was later converted into apartments by Candelisa, a property development company, and renamed "Horace Mill". The building retains its bellcote and Venetian window.
