= Cononley =

Village and civil parish in North Yorkshire, England

Coordinates: 53°55′08″N 2°01′03″W

- Location within North Yorkshire
- Population: 1,172 (2011 Census)
- OS grid reference: SD988469
  - London: 185 mi (298 km) SSE
- Unitary authority: North Yorkshire
- Ceremonial county: North Yorkshire
- Region: Yorkshire and the Humber
- Country: England
- Sovereign state: United Kingdom
- Post town: KEIGHLEY
- Postcode district: BD20
- Dialling code: 01535
- Police: North Yorkshire
- Fire: North Yorkshire
- Ambulance: Yorkshire
- UK Parliament: Skipton and Ripon

Cononley (/ˈkʊnlə/ KUUN-lə or /ˈkɒnənli/ KON-ən-lee) is a village and civil parish in the county of North Yorkshire, England. Cononley is in the Aire Valley 3 miles (5 km) south of Skipton and with an estimated population of 1,080 (2001 est.), measured at 1,172 at the 2011 census. It is situated 0.9 miles (1.5 km) west of the A629 road with access to Skipton, Keighley. Also joined to the Leeds-Carlisle railway, the village has commuter access to Leeds and Bradford.

Until 1974 it was part of the West Riding of Yorkshire. From 1974 to 2023 it was part of the Craven District, it is now administered by the unitary North Yorkshire Council.

The village is served by Cononley railway station.

== History and information ==
=== The origin of the settlement ===
There is evidence that people first settled around Cononley in the Bronze and Iron Ages. The Domesday Book contains only a brief mention of Cononley, but the settlement's name had probably originated several centuries earlier. The ending 'ley' refers to a clearing in the then wooded Aire valley and is shared with other Airedale communities. The first part of the name is derived from either a personal name or a river or beck name. The Cononley local historian, Trevor Hodgson, collected more than 60 different spellings of the name, in use from the 11th century onwards. Early spellings such as 'Conundley' and Cunanlay' may represent older pronunciations of the name.

=== Cononley in the Middle Ages and beyond ===
By the 12th century the present village had been laid out on a deliberate plan which is most obvious on the north side of Main Street where the plots (or 'tofts') ran northwards to Back (now Meadow) Lane. It may not be a coincidence that from the 12th century a significant part of the cultivated land was owned by Bolton Priory. Both Bolton Priory's Compotus (a listing of income and expenditure) and the Priory's records listing around 70 gifts of land in Cononley have survived. The latter record includes recognisable place names such as 'Dedehee' (Dead Eye). A smaller estate was owned by the Knights Hospitallers of St. John. By the time of the dissolution of the monasteries in the late 1530s these farms were all in the hands of tenants. Some 16 former Bolton Priory farms were bought by Henry Clifford, 1st. Earl of Cumberland. In addition, half a dozen former Knights Hospitallers' properties were transferred to the Crown and remained in the hands of the monarch for the remainder of the 16th century. The fortunate survival of many of these records is due to the lordship of the manor of Cononley having been acquired by the Earls of Cumberland. Many manor court rolls have also been preserved and some 40 of these have now been published, giving an insight into many of the concerns of Cononley people from 1518 to 1852.

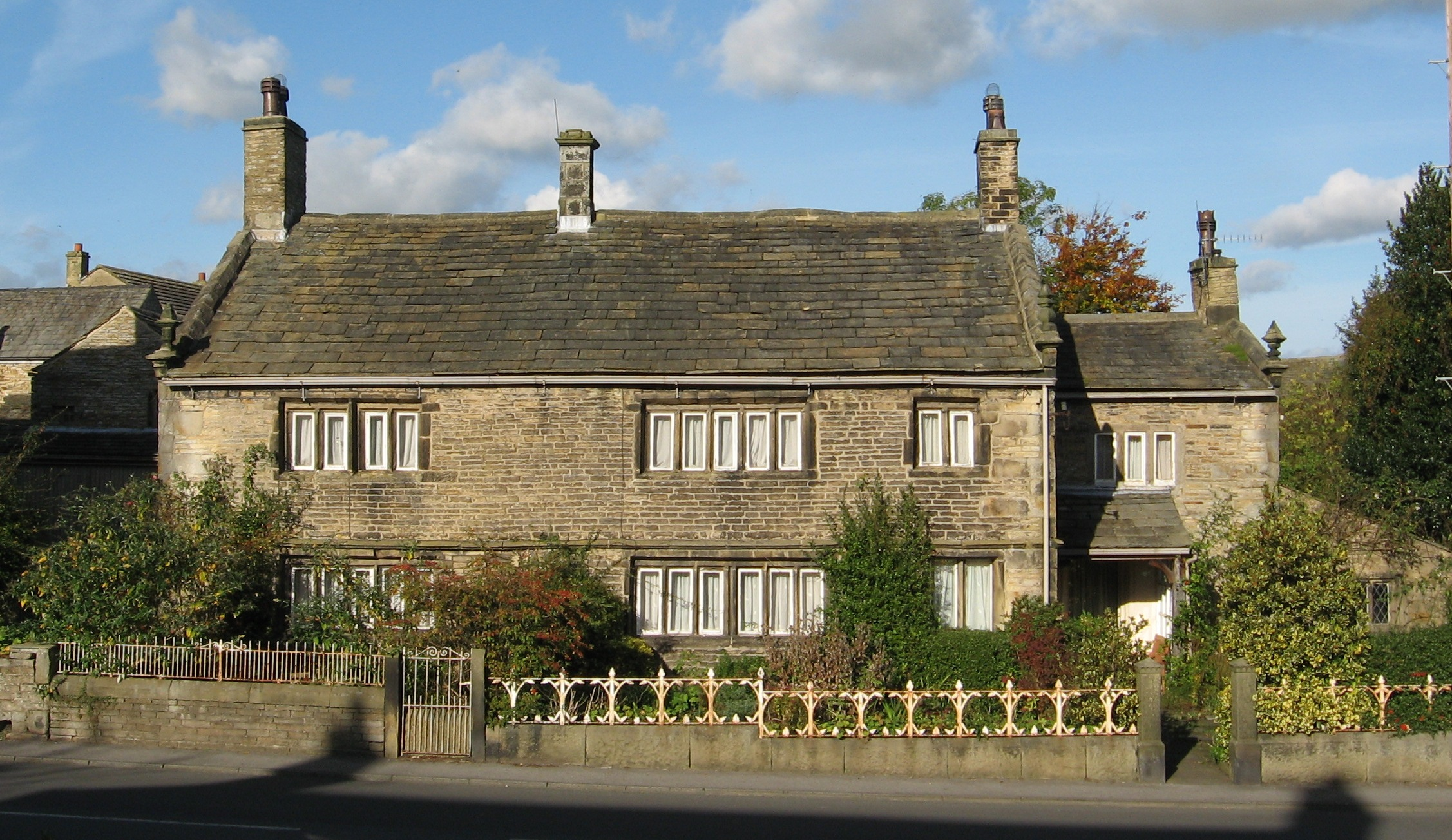
Milton House in 2007. The date stone is inscribed 1635 EMS for Edward and Margaret Sawley

The financial difficulties of George Clifford, 3rd. Earl of Cumberland benefited prosperous Cononley farmers. A number of these men were able to purchase very long leases and effectively become owners of their farms. This process also left its mark on the village because these better off inhabitants were able to begin to rebuild their houses in stone. Milton House, once called Sawley House, bears the date 1635. However, it and other nearby houses e.g. Bradleys Farm and The New Inn (in which a fragment of a timber cruck frame has been uncovered) may well date, at least in part, from an earlier century. A succession of these successful farming families dominated land ownership in the village in the 17th and 18th centuries. These included the Sawley and Bradley families, the Tillotson family and a number of branches of the Laycock family. Roger Swire became a land owner in Cononley about 1627 and by the later 18th century his family had come to dominate property ownership in the village.

=== The Swire family and Cononley Hall ===
The Swire Family lived at Cononley Hall from the 17th to the 19th centuries. An existent date stone, evidently moved from its original position and possibly recut bears the date 1683. A second date stone for 1680, probably removed when ancillary buildings were demolished about 1930, is now owned by members of the current Swire family. These facts, in addition to the style of the building, suggest that the oldest part of the present Hall was built in the 1680s for Samuel and Elizabeth Swire. Similar houses in the Airedale often have three gables and the same maybe true of the 17th century Cononley Hall. The cellars may survive from an earlier building on the site. According to John William Moorhouse, who could have been present, during alterations to the building in 1903 a 'secret passage' was found near the large fireplace on the ground floor of 'The Old Hall'. The discovery was linked to an earlier story that a Jacobite kinsman of the then owners, another Samuel and Elizabeth Swire, had escaped from the hall through such a passage in 1745 when pursued by George II's forces. The passage, perhaps useable by a desperate man, is likely to be the substantial stone walled water conduit seen by Trevor Hodgson in the late 20th century. Samuel and Elizabeth's second son, John, born in 1737, would be the grandfather of his namesake who established the internationally known business of John Swire & Sons in the early 19th century. Their elder son, Roger, born in 1735, probably lived to oversee the rebuilding of Cononley Hall before his death in 1778. The western wing of the old house was retained but a new taller classically proportioned building was erected beside it. Unfortunately Roger's son and grandson would only enjoy the new building for relatively short periods. In 1837 Cononley Hall was sold and, after a succession of owners and uses, was divided into three houses in 1911.

Roger Swire (1735–78) was the principal beneficiary of the enclosure of Cononley Moor in 1768. The enclosure completed a process which had been underway in Cononley for centuries and which removed the last common land available to smallholders with little land of their own. Another major beneficiary was Richard Wainman of Carr Head in Cowling, who was a descendant of the above-mentioned Bradley family. However, a number of farmers received uneconomical, and often poorly situated, allocations as a result of the enclosure and were forced to sell their land to the larger landowners. This process added to the increasing number of breadwinners who were skilled tradesmen or handloom weavers.

=== The Industrial Age ===
Between 1790 and 1810 a small water powered cotton mill operated at the upper end of the village. Woollen textile production would remain a domestic industry for several more decades. A group of self-employed men founded the Cononley Club Row Building Society in 1822. By 1832 they had built 32 houses on Cross Hills Road all of which were designed to hold looms. Club Row, also known as Union Row and now Aire View, acquired the nickname 'Frying Pan Row' after a story told by Enoch Whitaker (1831–1922) who actually owned the frying pan. In 1837 two separately owned mills were built close together between the village and the River Aire. The 'High' and 'Low' mills, as they were known, were built parallel with each other and at right angles to the road to Farnhill and Kildwick. The High Mill has now been converted into apartments, known as Horace Mills. The opening of the railway in 1847 will have helped to increase the diversification of occupations. By 1851 the population of Cononley had grown to 1,272.

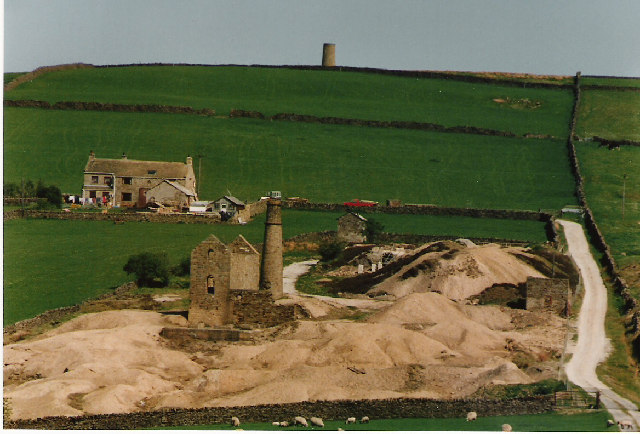
Disused lead mine at Cononley in 1996

The 1840s and 1850s saw the high point of lead production at Cononley Mine which was owned, then as now, by the Dukes of Devonshire. The Dukes of Devonshire had inherited the manor once owned by the Earls of Cumberland. Although there were exceptions, most of the men employed in the mine had moved relatively short distances to Cononley from other lead mining areas in Yorkshire. By 1861, at the peak of employment, some of the younger miners had been born in Cononley. Production of lead ore, latterly very limited, continued until 1881. Many miners left Cononley when the mine was in decline and only about two dozen men remained to take up other employment in the village.

In the late 1860s the 'New Mill', officially known as Aireside Mill, was built across the River Aire, in what was then, Farnhill. In 1880 it was bought by John Turner who was the owner of the mills near the station. At the end of the 19th century Station Mills were rebuilt to form a single building parallel with the road, also incorporating the 1837 High Mill and the earlier mill chimney, which remains a Cononley landmark. This development may have been one of the causes of the bankruptcy in 1901 of George Turner, one of John Turner's sons. The economic situation did not favour a plan to build an extensive estate of houses in 1897, partly on the land now occupied by the village playing field, and the scheme failed. A strike in both of the Turner family's mills coincided with a community based plan to promote the erection of a further textile mill in the village with the aim of broadening the workers' choice of employer. These two projects, had they come to fruition, would have radically altered the appearance of Cononley.

=== The Twentieth Century ===
In 1905 Station Mills was bought by Peter Green & Co. Part of the mill building was to be used for the production of cotton textiles. After 1910 a substantial part of the building, known as Station Works, housed the pioneering dynamo and electric motor factory of Horace Green & Co. After the First World War Horace Green's factory was considerably extended. By then the Aireside Mill was occupied by the worsted spinning business of Thomas Stell & Co.

In the early 20th century Cononley was a self-sufficient community. It was well served with churches and chapels: a Wesleyan Methodist chapel (built 1808), the Anglican St John's Church (built 1864), Mount Zion Methodist chapel (built 1869) and a Baptist Church (built 1877). Each was a centre of social life and many children attended their Sunday schools. A new County Primary School replaced the Anglican Church's 'National School' in 1910. There were more than ten shops including the Cononley Co-operative Society and a post office. The village had had four inns but two of these were closed in 1907. The Village Institute opened in 1909, partly to provide a non-denominational but, more especially, alcohol free place for people to use their leisure time productively. The village and its people in the early 20th century were recorded in a perceptive memoir by Catherine Moscrop, a village girl who would go on to attend Leeds University and become a missionary. The search for a satisfactory site for village playing fields lasted 40 years, probably because land owners hoped to sell their land for housing or industry, but Cononley Playing Field was eventually opened in 1937. Housing development in the first half of the 20th century was very limited due, in part, to the lack of further economic growth. A public housing development at Crag View commenced in 1925, using locally quarried stone. The notable public housing project after the Second World War was the estate at Meadow Croft.

An emphasis on industry should not detract from the continued importance of farming in Cononley during this period. However, the number of people engaged in work on the land steadily declined. The number of farms reduced from 47 in 1840, to 31 in 1953, and finally to only six in 1996. The second half of the 20th century also saw the end of Cononley as a major manufacturing centre: Peter Green & Co. closed in 1968, Thomas Stell & Co. closed in 1979 and finally, Horace Green & Co. ceased production in 1997.

=== Cononley today ===
With a population of 1,172 (2011 Census), farming is still significant, and there are still a few local businesses. The number of people employed in industry within the village has continued to decline. Part of the working community in the village commute to Skipton and Keighley, and a large number travel long distances, this made possible by frequent electric trains to Leeds and Bradford. The village has a joint Anglican-Methodist (LEP) church, a primary school, two public houses and a shop. It also has a sports club, in which has two football teams and cricket team. These are associated with craven and district league structures.

== See also ==
- Listed buildings in Cononley
- Airedale
- Settle-Carlisle Railway
- Skipton
