= Brimham Lodge =

Historic building in Hartwith cum Winsley, North Yorkshire, England

Coordinates: 54°03′54″N 1°39′16″W

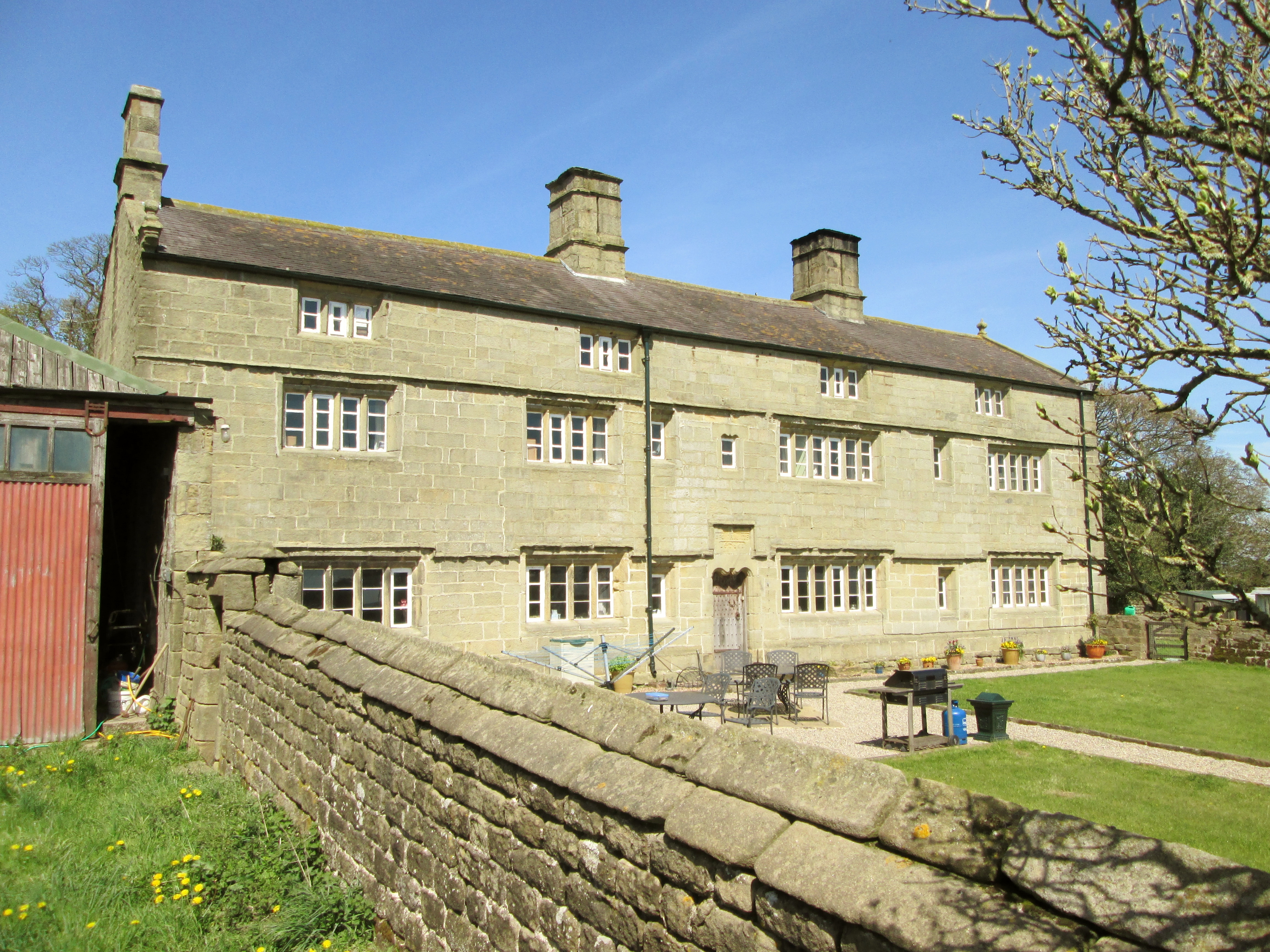
The building, in 2016

Brimham Lodge is a historic farmhouse in Nidderdale in North Yorkshire, in England.

The farmhouse was built in 1661 for Thomas Braithwaite. Additional bays were added to the left and right in the 19th century, and some restoration work was done in the mid 20th century. In the 1940s, the farm was purchased by Tom Gratton, who walked his 16 cows almost 20 miles from Pool in Wharfedale. More recently, it has operated as a dairy farm, with 200 cows on 300 acres. The building was grade I listed in 1987.

The house is built of gritstone, and has a blue slate roof with moulded kneelers, splayed coping and bulbous finials. There are two storeys and attics, five bays, and a rear staircase wing. The central doorway has a chamfered moulded surround of large blocks, and a lintel with an enriched ogee arch. Above it is a large initialled and dated block and a single-light window. Elsewhere on the front are recessed chamfered mullioned windows with up to six lights and continuous hood moulds over the lower two floors. In the rear wing is a three-light mullioned and transomed stair window.

North of the farmhouse is a grade II-listed outbuilding of similar date. It is also built of gritstone, with quoins, and a stone slate roof with shaped kneelers and gable coping. It has two storeys and two bays. In the centre is a stable door with a chamfered quoined surround, and a large lintel with a shallow four-centred arch. To the right is another doorway, and on the left stone steps lead up to a doorway with a quoined surround. The windows are recessed, chamfered and mullioned.

South of the farmhouse is a 17th-century grade II-listed mounting block. It is built of gritstone, and consists of three steps surrounding a platform about 2 metres (6 ft 7 in) wide and 1.2 metres (3 ft 11 in) high. In the centre of the platform is a sundial, consisting of a shaft chamfered to a square 1 metre (3 ft 3 in) high, with the gnomon missing.

The front garden wall is late 17th century and is also grade II-listed. It is built of gritstone with ridged coping, and is between 2 metres (6 ft 7 in) and 1 metre (3 ft 3 in) high. At the north end of the west wall is a gateway with chamfered quoined jambs, and a lintel with a shallow four-centred arch and hollow moulding. In the centre of the south wall is a gateway with stone piers about 1.5 metres (4 ft 11 in) high with ball finials.

== See also ==
- Grade I listed buildings in North Yorkshire (district)
- Listed buildings in Hartwith cum Winsley
