= Summerbridge, North Yorkshire =

Hamlet in North Yorkshire, England

Coordinates: 54°03′26″N 1°41′35″W

Summerbridge
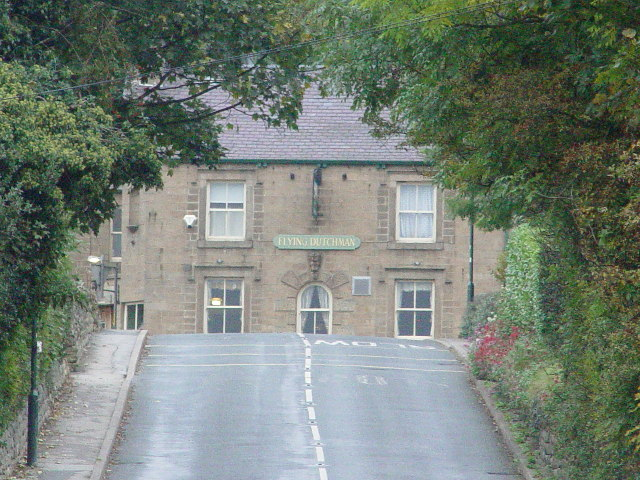
- Flying Dutchman public house

- Location within North Yorkshire
- OS grid reference: SE198622
- Civil parish: Hartwith cum Winsley
- Unitary authority: North Yorkshire
- Ceremonial county: North Yorkshire
- Region: Yorkshire and the Humber
- Country: England
- Sovereign state: United Kingdom
- Post town: HARROGATE
- Postcode district: HG3
- Police: North Yorkshire
- Fire: North Yorkshire
- Ambulance: Yorkshire
- UK Parliament: Skipton and Ripon

Summerbridge is a village in Nidderdale in North Yorkshire, England. It is on the River Nidd, adjacent to Dacre Banks on the opposite bank of the river, and lies about 2.5 miles (4 km) south east of Pateley Bridge. The village is part of the historic West Riding of Yorkshire.

The village has one public house, the Flying Dutchman, owned and operated by Samuel Smith Old Brewery, tea rooms and several other shops (including a general store and a large hardware store). There is also a garage and several more businesses on a small industrial estate at New York, sometimes considered part of Summerbridge. There is also a large Methodist church, a primary school and a retained fire station.

Summerbridge is served by two-hourly buses of Harrogate Bus Company (route 24) between Harrogate and Pateley Bridge.

The village is the largest settlement in the civil parish of Hartwith cum Winsley. It is the nearest village to Brimham Rocks, 2 miles (3 km) away.

== In film ==
Many of the locations of the village were featured in the 1970 film Wuthering Heights.

== See also ==
- Listed buildings in Hartwith cum Winsley
