= West End, West Riding of Yorkshire =

Former village in Yorkshire, England

Coordinates: 54.018°N 1.780°W

West End
- Village
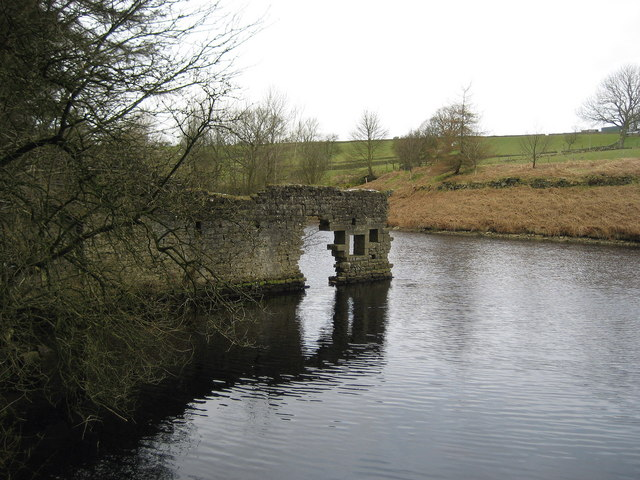
- Ruined mill on Capelshaw Beck

- Location within North Yorkshire
- Civil parish: Thruscross
- Unitary authority: North Yorkshire
- Ceremonial county: North Yorkshire
- Region: Yorkshire and the Humber
- Country: England
- Sovereign state: United Kingdom

West End was a village in the Washburn Valley of the West Riding of Yorkshire, England, which was depopulated when the valley was flooded to form Thruscross Reservoir in the 1960s. The village was 4 miles (6.4 km) south-west of Dacre (its nearest railway station), 5 miles (8 km) south of Pateley Bridge, and 10 miles (16 km) north of Otley. A hamlet called West End still exists in the area, and is to the south-west of the reservoir.

== History ==
Several mills were located in the village on the Capelshaw Beck and also on the River Washburn which processed corn, cotton and hemp. However, this industry suffered when steam power replaced water power during the 19th century, and other mills in the West Riding had access to coal to power the mills via the railways, but the availability to the mills in the Washburn Valley of coal was very limited. The other mills could then out-produce the mills in the Washburn Valley. A dame school was also located in the village which catered to the local population. The village was also named interchangeably as Thruscross (or Thurscross) and was in the ancient ecclesiastical parish of Fewston. However, due to the number of mills built on the River Washburn and its tributaries in the West End area, the village of West End was afforded its own parish. The name West End has been suggested to be derived from the fact that it was at the west end of Fewston parish.

The road leading north-east from the village went 4 miles (6.4 km) to Dacre, with Dacre being listed as the nearest railway station in 1927 when the Nidd Valley Railway was still in use. The village was also 5 miles (8 km) south of Pateley Bridge, 11.5 miles (18.5 km) east of Skipton, and 10 miles (16 km) north of Otley.

The village was partly depopulated in the 19th century by a typhus outbreak (1838–1840), and some of the inhabitants left the dale to find work after the mills closed down. The village was certainly completely deserted by 1911, long before the flooding of the valley. The new reservoir covered 142 acres (57 ha) of land, including the Little Inn which was built in 1699, the chapel, which had been elevated to church status in the 19th century (c. 1873) as the Church of the Holy Trinity, and the remains of five mills. The churchyard was moved onto the high moor to the east and is still there today. Arthur Mee alleges that one of the mills used children to work its looms and the "brutal masters" kept them at the looms until they were exhausted, working 76-hour weeks and only having two holidays a year; Christmas Day and the July feast day.

Leeds Corporation built the three reservoirs on the River Washburn south of Blubberhouses, but although they started buying up land from 1896, they turned their attention for water supply to the Colsterdale valley west of Masham (the Leighton Reservoir). As the Leeds Corporation bought most of the land in the upper valley (ostensibly to prevent pollution and other building works going ahead), the farmers and villagers found themselves to be tenants of the corporation. The village was finally cleared in 1960, to allow for work to be undertaken in preparation for the Thruscross Reservoir scheme. Some of the old mill buildings were left intact as the owners, who had emigrated to America, could not be traced, so the permission to demolish could not be acquired. Various stones from the mills were used to build a new church, All Saints, on the western shore of the reservoir, which itself closed soon afterwards as the depopulated area could not support the numbers of people needed for a congregation. The flooding of the settlement was partly the inspiration of Peter Robinson's novel In a Dry Season.

The name of the settlement persists in the hamlet of West End, which is to the south west of Thruscross Reservoir and it is in the Thruscross civil parish.
