= Ripley Valley railway station =

Disused railway station in North Yorkshire, England

Ripley Valley
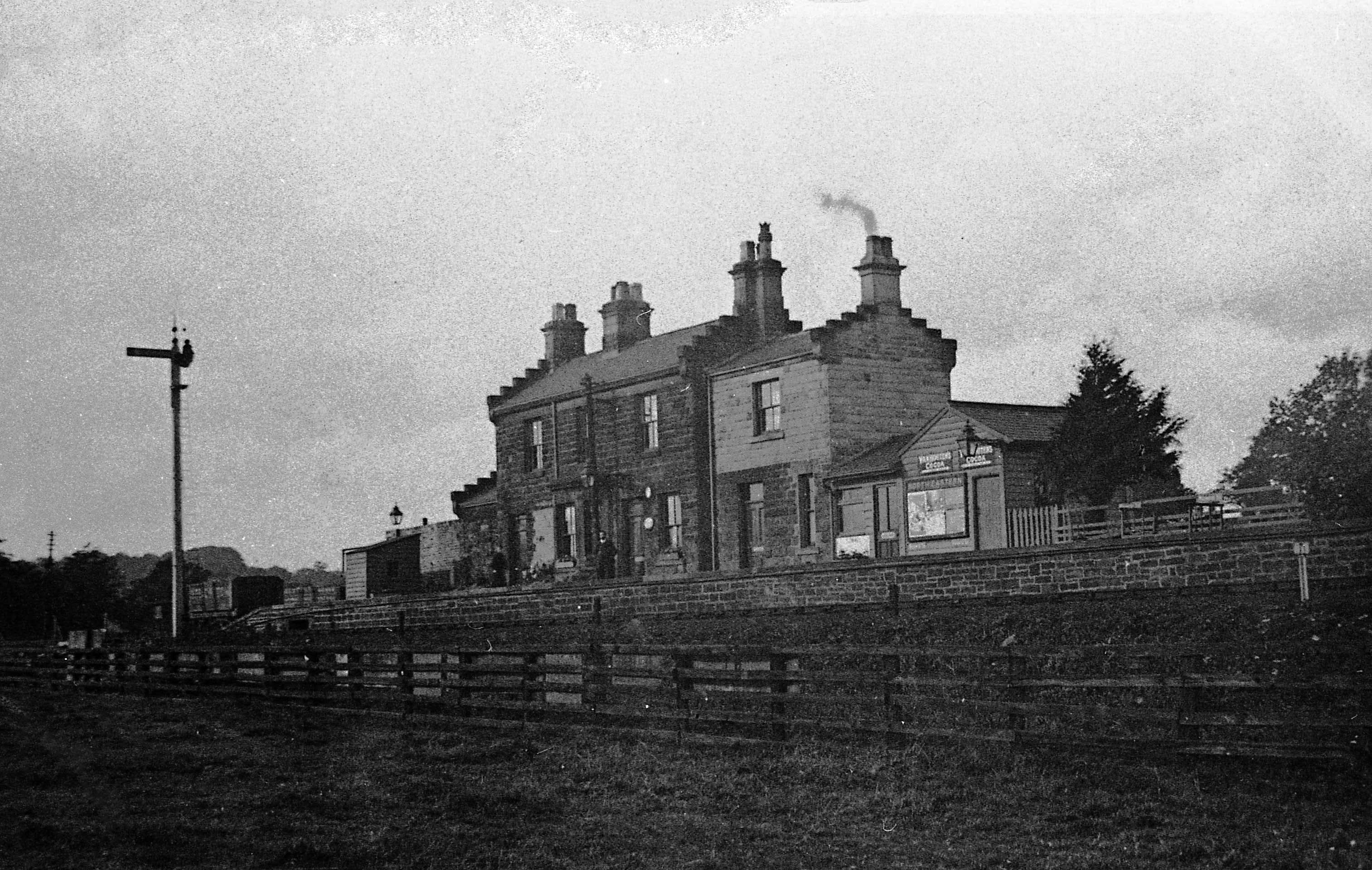
- Old postcard view c1910

General information
- Location: Ripley, North Yorkshire; England
- Coordinates: 54.0328°N 1.5652°W
- Grid reference: SE285597
- Platforms: 1

Other information
- Status: Disused

History
- Original company: North Eastern Railway
- Pre-grouping: North Eastern Railway
- Post-grouping: LNER

Key dates
- 1 May 1862: Opened as Killinghall
- 1 June 1862: Name changed to Ripley
- 1 March 1875: Name changed to Ripley Castle
- 1 April 1875: Name changed to Ripley Valley
- 2 April 1951: Closed to passengers
- 6 November 1961: Closed to goods traffic
Location

Ripley Valley railway station served the villages of Killinghall and Ripley, North Yorkshire, England from 1862 to 1951 on the Nidd Valley Railway.

== History ==
The station was opened as Killinghall on 1 May, 1862 by the North Eastern Railway. It was renamed to Ripley on 1 June 1862 and then to Ripley Castle on 1 March 1875 before a final renaming (after objections from the owner of Ripley castle) to Ripley Valley on 1 April 1875.

It was situated between Ripley Valley Junction (on the Leeds Northern main line from Harrogate to Ripon and Northallerton) and Hampsthwaite; the main road from Harrogate to Ripon crossed the line immediately east of the station. One of the four original stations on the Nidd Valley branch, Ripley had a small goods yard with two sidings, a hand crane and a weigh house. There were no facilities for coal, this being handled at Nidd Bridge station. The building itself was to the design of NER Architect Thomas Prosser, with stepped gable ends, similar to those at Birstwith, Dacre and Pateley Bridge. An additional bedroom was added later at the eastern end, along with a small timber lock-up warehouse and an office. As at Darley, a small three-sided shelter was provided on the platform for the signal and point levers.

The station was host to a LNER camping coach from 1936 to 1939 and possibly one for some of 1934.

The station closed to passengers on 2 April 1951. Closure to goods traffic took place from 6 November 1961. After closure the station building remained in use for some time, but the site was later completely cleared and has been redeveloped for commercial use.

Preceding station	Historical railways	Following station
Hampsthwaite; Line and station closed	Nidd Valley Railway	Starbeck; Line open, station open
