= Hampsthwaite Bridge =

Bridge in Hampsthwaite, North Yorkshire, England

Coordinates: 54.0276°N 1.6035°W

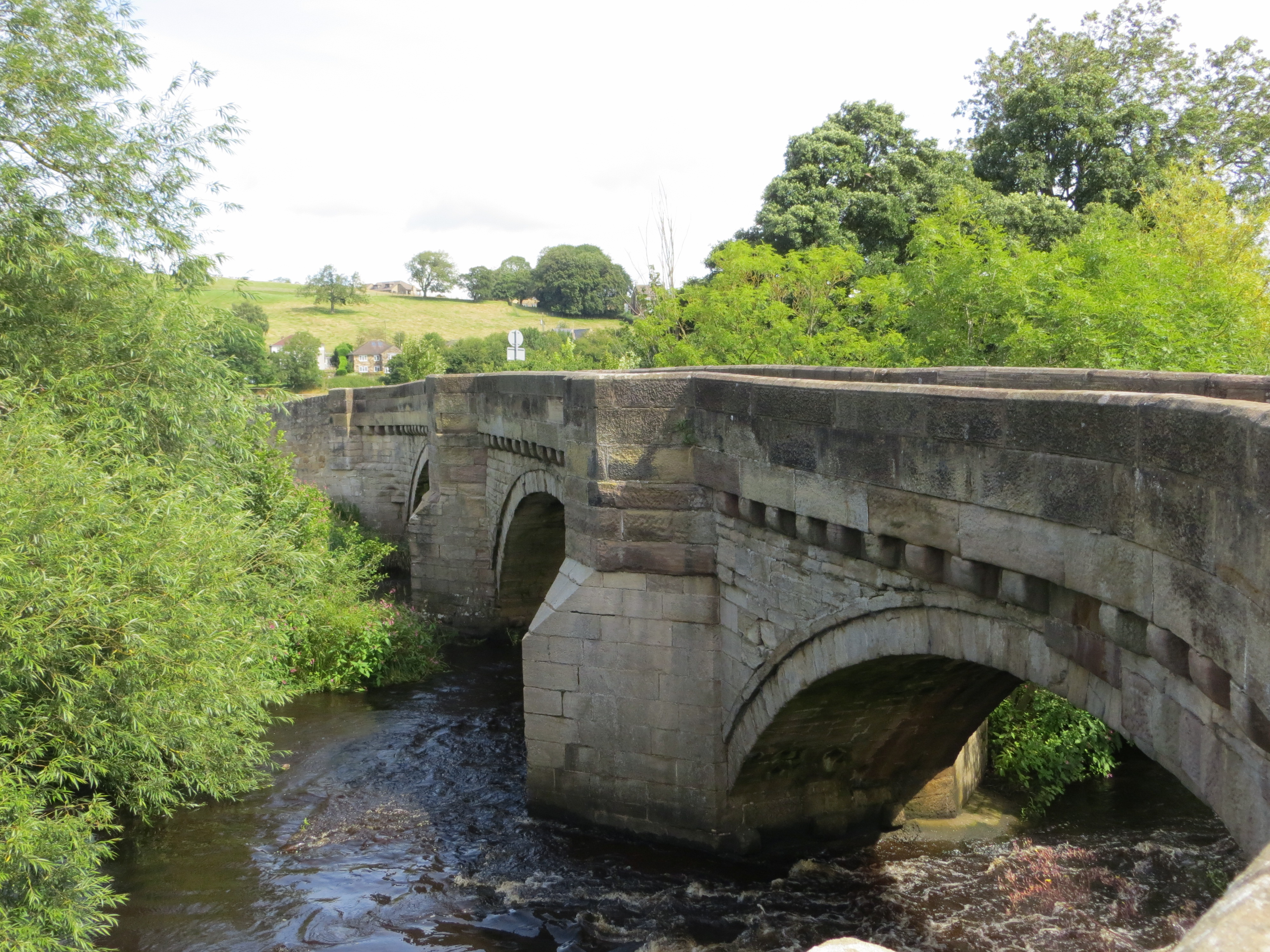
The bridge, in 2017

Hampsthwaite Bridge is a historic structure in Hampsthwaite, a village in North Yorkshire, in England.

A bridge over the River Nidd in Hampsthwaite was first recorded in 1527. It was rebuilt in 1598, probably in timber. In 1640, it was rebuilt in stone. The parapet was rebuilt, probably in the 19th century, and at a similar time, the southern arch was widened on the west side. The bridge was grade II listed in 1952. In 2001, a lorry crashed through the parapet and was left dangling over the river, following which it was closed to heavy goods vehicles. In 2023, large cracks appeared in the bridge, and it was temporarily closed to allow the rebuilding of one of the parapets.

The bridge is built of gritstone, and consists of three segmental arches with the voussoirs set back slightly. It has triangular cutwaters, chamfered at the top, carried up as pedestrian recesses, and corbels carrying the overhanging parapet.

== See also ==
- Listed buildings in Hampsthwaite
