= Darley, North Yorkshire =

Village in North Yorkshire, England

Coordinates: 54°01′56″N 1°41′37″W

Darley
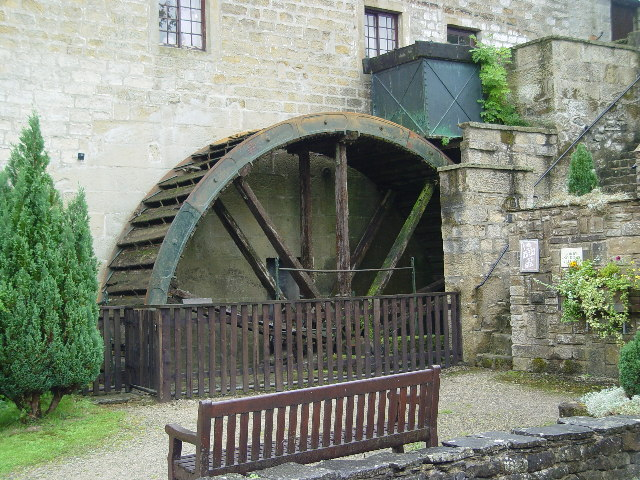
- Waterwheel at Darley Mill

- Location within North Yorkshire
- Population: 1,332
- OS grid reference: SE205595
- Civil parish: Darley and Menwith
- Unitary authority: North Yorkshire
- Ceremonial county: North Yorkshire
- Region: Yorkshire and the Humber
- Country: England
- Sovereign state: United Kingdom
- Post town: HARROGATE
- Postcode district: HG3
- Police: North Yorkshire
- Fire: North Yorkshire
- Ambulance: Yorkshire

Darley is a linear village in Nidderdale in the county of North Yorkshire, England. The population as at the 2011 Census is 1,332 and is included in the civil parish of Darley and Menwith. The village extends for 1 mile east from a junction with the B6451 road. The western end of the village is known as Darley Head and the eastern end as The Holme. Darley has won many local and national 'Britain in Bloom' awards.

== Amenities ==
Darley has two churches, Christ Church (Anglican) and Darley Methodist Church. There are three community halls (Darley Memorial Hall, Christ Church Community Centre and Hookstone Memorial Hall), a playing field, and a combined village store and post office that became a locally run concern in 2016.

At the western end of the village is Darley Mill, a grade II listed 17th-century corn mill. It formerly housed a restaurant and retail units, but these closed in 2016 after the business were not deemed viable. Nearby is Darley's only pub, the Wellington Inn.

Darley used to have a railway station on the Nidd Valley Railway, but this was closed in 1951. The village is served by hourly buses of Harrogate Bus Company (route 24) between Harrogate and Pateley Bridge.

== Civil parish ==
Darley is the only village in the civil parish of Darley and Menwith, until 2013 known as Menwith with Darley. In the 2011 census the parish had a population of 1,332. Apart from the village, the parish consists of scattered farms and houses to the south west of the village, and includes the northern part of RAF Menwith Hill. There is no settlement of Menwith, although the name was first recorded in 1230. Menwith is derived from the Old English mǣne "common" and the Old Norse viðr "wood", and refers to the "common wood" of Darley.

The parish of Menwith with Darley was historically a township in the parish of Hampsthwaite, in the West Riding of Yorkshire. It became a separate civil parish in 1866. It was transferred to the new county of North Yorkshire in 1974. From 1974 to 2023 it was part of the Borough of Harrogate, it is now administered by the unitary North Yorkshire Council.

== See also ==
- Listed buildings in Darley and Menwith
