= The Old Mill, Hampsthwaite =

Mill building in Hampsthwaite, North Yorkshire, England

The Old Mill is a historic building in Hampsthwaite, a village in North Yorkshire, in England.

The watermill was built in the early 19th century, on Cockhill Beck. It was later converted to steam power, and the waterwheel was removed. In the mid 20th century, the building was converted into a house. It was grade II listed in 1987. In 2021, it was marketed for sale for £1.595 million, at which time, it had five bedrooms and three reception rooms.

The mill is built of gritstone, with quoins, stone gutter brackets, and a grey slate roof with stone slates at the eaves, shaped kneelers and gable copings. It has three storeys and four bays. On the front is a doorway and the windows are casements.

== See also ==
- Listed buildings in Hampsthwaite
