= St Saviour's Church, Thornthwaite =

Church in Thornthwaite, North Yorkshire, England

Coordinates: 54.0290°N 1.7371°W

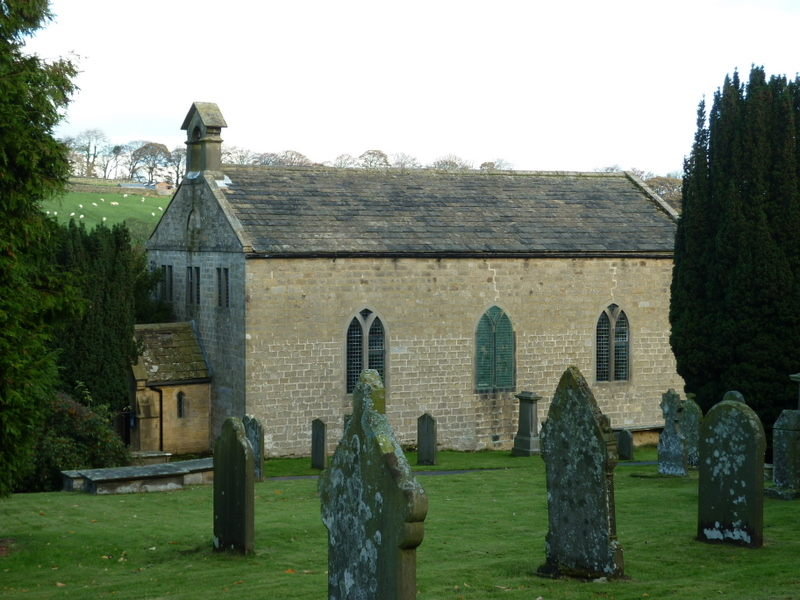
The church, in 2010

St Saviour's Church is the parish church of Thornthwaite, a village in North Yorkshire, in England.

Thornthwaite long lay in the parish of St Thomas a Becket's Church, Hampsthwaite. A chapel of ease was built in the village by 1409. A replacement was constructed on the same site in 1810. It was refurbished in 1893, when a porch and bellcote were added. Nikolaus Pevsner describes it as a "little single cell in open country". The building was grade II listed in 1987.

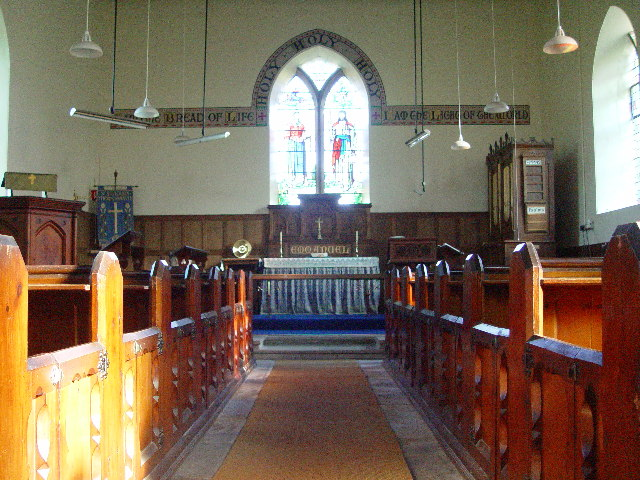
View from the nave into the chancel

The church is built of gritstone with a stone slate roof. It consists of a nave and a chancel in one cell, and a west porch, and on the west gable is a gabled bellcote. At the west end are three two-light windows, an eaves band and a semicircular recess above. The other windows have pointed heads and Y-tracery.

== See also ==
- Listed buildings in Thornthwaite with Padside
