= Thornthwaite, North Yorkshire =

Village in North Yorkshire, England

Coordinates: 54.025°N 1.740°W

Thornthwaite
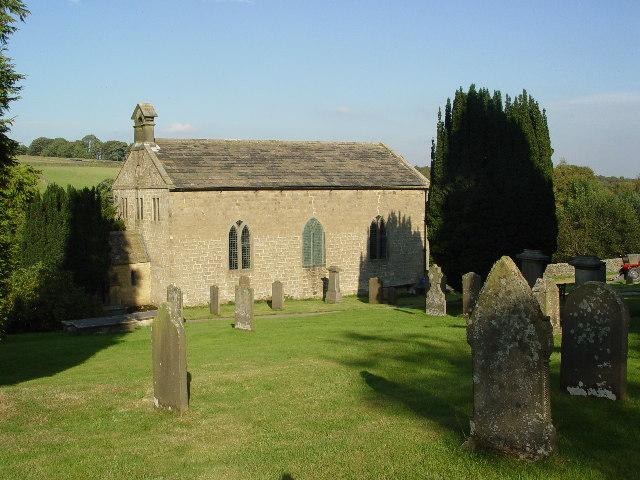
- St Saviour's Church

- Location within North Yorkshire
- Population: 220
- OS grid reference: SE172588
- Civil parish: Thornthwaite with Padside
- Unitary authority: North Yorkshire
- Ceremonial county: North Yorkshire
- Region: Yorkshire and the Humber
- Country: England
- Sovereign state: United Kingdom
- Post town: HARROGATE
- Postcode district: HG3
- Police: North Yorkshire
- Fire: North Yorkshire
- Ambulance: Yorkshire

Thornthwaite is a small village in the county of North Yorkshire, England. It lies in the valley of Padside Beck, a side valley on the south side of Nidderdale, 9 miles (14 km) west of Harrogate.

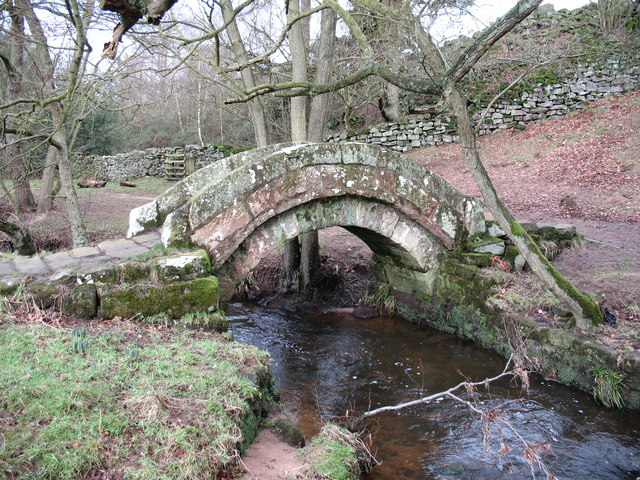
Packhorse bridge across Padside Beck

Padside Beck is crossed by a packhorse bridge thought to date from the 15th century. It was probably on a packhorse route from Ilkley to Fountains Abbey, and may have been constructed by the abbey. The bridge is a scheduled monument.

Thornthwaite is the largest settlement in the civil parish of Thornthwaite with Padside, historically a township in the ancient parish of Hampsthwaite. It became a separate civil parish in 1866. The parish includes the hamlet of Padside, a mile west of Thornthwaite, and extends 6 miles (10 km) north-west of the village to the upper valley of the River Washburn. The population of the parish is estimated at 220. In the 2011 census the population of the parish was included with Thruscross, and the total of the two parishes was 312.

Until 1974 it was part of the West Riding of Yorkshire. From 1974 to 2023 it was part of the Borough of Harrogate, it is now administered by the unitary North Yorkshire Council.

Thornthwaite Scout Centre and camp site, located near the village, is maintained by Harrogate and Nidderdale Scout District.

== See also ==
- Listed buildings in Thornthwaite with Padside
