= Thruscross Reservoir =

Reservoir in North Yorkshire, England

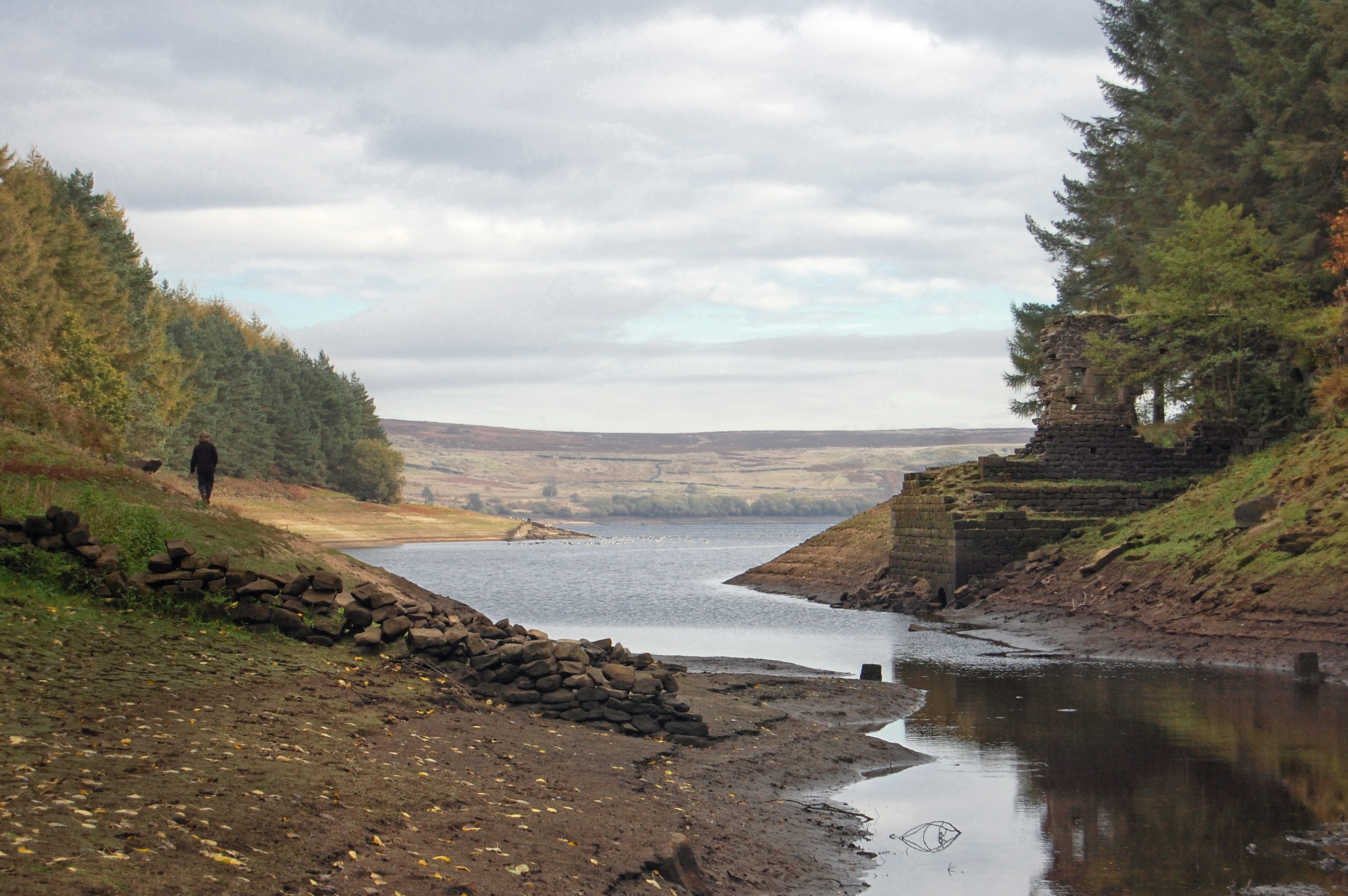
- Thruscross Reservoir

- Location within North Yorkshire
- Location: North Yorkshire
- Coordinates: 54°1′1″N 1°46′24″W
- Type: reservoir
- Primary inflows: Washburn
- Primary outflows: Washburn
- Basin countries: United Kingdom

Thruscross Reservoir is the northernmost of four reservoirs in the Washburn Valley, lying north of Otley and west of Harrogate in North Yorkshire, England, near the hamlet of Thruscross. It can be found on an unclassified road from the A59 road (where the road from Otley joins). Permission to construct the reservoir was granted to Leeds Corporation Waterworks via the Leeds (Lindley Wood Reservoir) Water Order 1960 (SI 1960/2298) and Thruscross was completed in 1966, much later than the other three reservoirs which date back to the nineteenth century.

== Flooded village ==
The construction of the reservoir flooded the village of West End, which was already largely derelict following the decline of the flax industry. There is another hamlet close to the reservoir that retains the name of West End. The remains of a flax mill can be seen at the edge of the reservoir, and more of the village has been revealed at times of drought, such as the summers of 1989 and 1990. The work to build the reservoir included clearing trees, removing sacred items from the church, and exhuming bodies from the graveyard.

== Management ==
The reservoir is the property of Yorkshire Water, which manages it for the benefit of walkers, anglers and wildlife. The section of the river below the reservoir is used for whitewater kayaking when water is released by Yorkshire Water.

== Cultural references ==
In the novel In a Dry Season by the English-born, Canadian-based crime writer Peter Robinson, the fictional village of Hobb's End, flooded by the creation of the Thornfield Reservoir, is exposed during a drought, leading to the discovery of a body. The geography described by Robinson indicates that he based the location of Hobb's End on the village of West End. The small bridge over the Washburn becomes the 'Fairy Bridge' and the flax mill is mentioned explicitly.

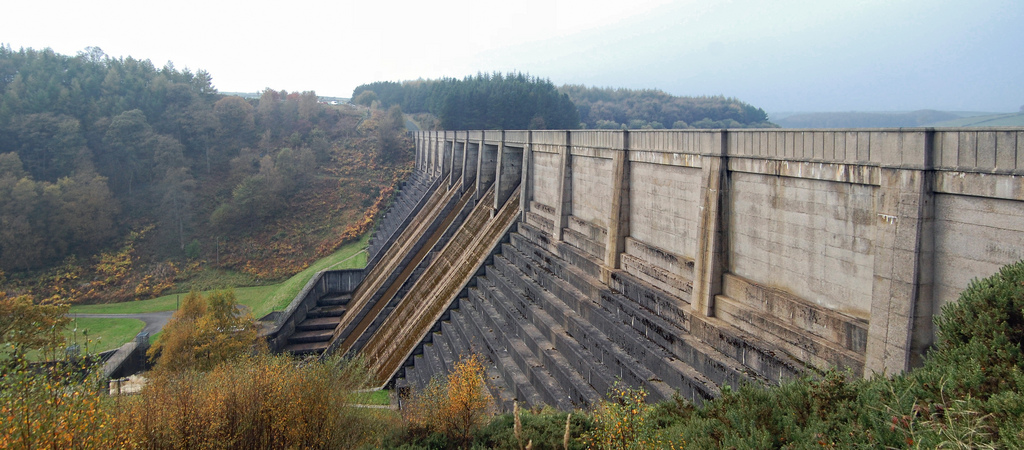
Thruscross Reservoir dam
