= Listed buildings in Thruscross =

Thruscross is a civil parish in the county of North Yorkshire, England. It contains 16 listed buildings that are recorded in the National Heritage List for England. All the listed buildings are designated at Grade II, the lowest of the three grades, which is applied to "buildings of national importance and special interest". The parish contains the small settlement of Thruscross and the surrounding countryside. Apart from a clapper bridge, all the listed buildings are houses, farmhouses and farm buildings.

== Buildings ==
| Name and location | Photograph | Date | Notes |
|---|---|---|---|
| Farmhouse south of North Corner Farmhouse; 54.02163°N 1.77194°W | — | Early 17th century | A house and a barn in gritstone with a stone slate roof. The house has two storeys and two bays. On the left bay is a doorway with a quoined surround and a lintel with a deep chamfer and an elliptical arch, and mullioned windows with some mullions missing. The right bay contains a doorway with a plain surround and a loading door. The barn to the left has three bays, and its openings are obscured. |
| Lane Head Farmhouse and barn 54.02458°N 1.80306°W | — | Early to mid-17th century | Two houses at right angles, the later one dating from the 19th century, in gritstone with quoins, a stone slate roof with a shaped kneeler and coped gable, and two storeys. The older house has three bays, a blocked doorway with a chamfered quoined surround and a triangular lintel, the lower edge cut into a narrow four-centred arch. The windows are mullioned, and there are two loading doors. The later house has two bays, a central doorway with tie-stones, and sash windows. |
| Redsharw Hall, outbuildings, walls and pig-sty 54.00629°N 1.76756°W | — | 17th century | The farmhouse is in stone, and has a stone slate roof with coped gables. There are two storeys and three bays. On the front is a doorway, some windows are mullioned, some are sash windows, and at the rear is a round-headed stair window. There are outbuildings attached on each side. In front, low stone walls enclose a rectangular garden, with a pig-sty and feeding troughs at the southeast corner. |
| Barn to southeast of Redshaw Hall; 54.00609°N 1.76722°W | — | 17th century | A farmhouse, later a barn, in stone, with quoins, and a stone slate roof with coped gables and kneelers. There are two storeys and four bays. The left bay contains a doorway in a recessed round-headed arch, and to the right are two further doorways. In the centre are external steps leading up to a loft door, and elsewhere there are various windows. |
| Brace Croft Farmhouse; 54.02214°N 1.80489°W | | Late 17th century | The farmhouse is in stone and has a stone slate roof with a shaped kneeler and a coped gable on the left. There are two storeys and two bays. The doorway has an alternate quoined surround, and a lintel with a four-centred arch. The windows on the front are mullioned, those on the ground floor with hood moulds. At the rear is a projecting semicircular staircase bay, a fire window, and an inserted window. |
| The Raw and barn 54.02103°N 1.77142°W | — | Late 17th century | A farmhouse and barn in stone, with a stone slate roof, coped gable and kneelers, and two storeys. On the front of the house are two doorways with chamfered surrounds, and mullioned windows under a continuous chamfered hood mould. The barn has a central segmental-headed cart entrance, two doorways and a blocked mullioned window. At the rear are two blocked openings with chamfered surrounds and a loft opening. |
| Bridge over Capelshaw Beck; 54.02104°N 1.80328°W | | 17th or 18th century | The clapper bridge is in gritstone and is about 3 metres (9.8 ft) in length. It consists of two pairs of flat stones laid between the bank and blocks in mid-stream. |
| North Corner Farmhouse; 54.02326°N 1.77112°W | — | 1703 | The farmhouse is in gritstone, with quoins, and a stone slate roof with moulded kneelers, and stone gable copings. There are two storeys, two bays, an added bay to the left, and a rear outshut. On the front is a porch, and a doorway with a re-set lintel with ogee moulding, initials and the date. Most of the windows are mullioned. |
| Barn to east of North Corner Farmhouse; 54.02328°N 1.77036°W | — | 1704 | The barn is in gritstone with a stone slate roof. There are five bays and an outshut in front of the middle three bays. On the front are double doors, and two stable doors with quoined jambs, the left with a dated and initialled lintel. Inside, there is a raised cruck truss. |
| Middle Farm; 54.02138°N 1.76238°W | — | Mid-18th century | A house and attached barn in gritstone, with a stone slate roof and shaped kneelers and gable coping on the left, and two storeys. The house has three bays, and on the front is a doorway flanked by mullioned windows. The barn to the right has three bays, and contains a central cart entrance with quoined jambs, a byre door with tie-stone jambs, and a window. |
| Dukes Hill Cottage; 54.02063°N 1.79679°W | — | 1765 | A house with an attached barn in gritstone, with stone slate roofs, shaped kneelers and gable coping. The house has a plinth, rusticated quoins, sill bands, and stone gutter brackets. There are two storeys, a two-bay main range and an added bay to the right. The doorway has an eared architrave, a pulvinated frieze, and a pediment on cornices, above which is an inscribed and dated plaque. The windows are in Venetian style with keystones. The barn to the left has four bays, and contains a cart entrance with a segmental head and byre doors, all with quoined surrounds. |
| House and barn 54.02094°N 1.79268°W | | Mid to late 18th century | The barn is the older part, with the house probably added in the early 19th century. They are in gritstone and have a stone slate roof with shaped kneelers and gable coping. The barn has three bays and quoins, and contains a central cart entrance with quoined jambs and a lintel, and a blocked byre door with narrow jambs and tie-stones. The house has two storeys and one bay, a doorway with tie-stones, and a window in each floor. |
| Brae House and barn range 54.01930°N 1.81329°W | — | 1771 | The house and the later barn range are in gritstone, with a stone slate roof, shaped kneelers and gable coping. The house has a plinth, quoins, two storeys and two bays, and a single-storey bay to the right. The doorway has a quoined surround and a dated and initialled lintel, and the windows are mullioned. The barn range to the left is higher on a slope, and has five bays, and a two-bay stable and cart shed. It contains a segmental arch, byre doors, and a sash window. |
| Cop Hurst Farmhouse; 54.02009°N 1.80832°W | — | Late 18th century | The house is in gritstone, with moulded stone gutters, and a stone slate roof with shaped kneelers and gable coping. There are two storeys and a cellar, and two bays. The doorway has a tie-stone surround, and the windows are mullioned and contain central sashes. |
| Barn to east of Redsharw Hall; 54.00634°N 1.76719°W | — | Late 18th century | The barn is in stone, with quoins, and a stone slate roof with coped gables and kneelers. On the south front is a large segmental-arched cart entrance and three stable doors. Above the cart entrance is a dated and initialled plaque. The north front has a doorway and a window. |
| Barn to north of Redsharw Hall; 54.00658°N 1.76768°W | — | Late 18th century | The barn is in stone, with quoins, and a stone slate roof with coped gables and kneelers. In the centre of the south front is a large cart entrance with a stone lintel, and to the right is a small doorway. |
