= Listed buildings in Darley and Menwith =

Darley and Menwith is a civil parish in the county of North Yorkshire, England. It contains twelve listed buildings that are recorded in the National Heritage List for England. All the listed buildings are designated at Grade II, the lowest of the three grades, which is applied to "buildings of national importance and special interest". The parish contains the village of Darley and the surrounding countryside. Most of the listed buildings are houses, farmhouses and farm buildings, and the others consist of a set of stocks, a former watermill, and a chapel.

== Buildings ==
Name and location	Photograph	Date	Notes
The Holme; 54.03197°N 1.66993°W		c. 1500	The house has a timber framed core, it was encased in gritstone in 1667, and has quoins, and a thatched roof with shaped kneelers and a shallow gable parapet. There are two storeys and four bays, and a continuous rear outshut. On the front is a doorway with a chamfered quoined jambs, and a lintel cut to a shallow Tudor arch containing a panel with carved initials and a date. The windows are recessed, chamfered and mullioned, with a continuous hood mould over the ground floor windows.
Fringill Top Farmhouse and barn 54.02526°N 1.68314°W	—	Late 17th century	The farmhouse and barn are in gritstone, with quoins, stone slate roofs, and two storeys. The house has two bays, a gabled porch, and a doorway with a chamfered quoined surround. The windows are recessed with chamfered surrounds and mullions, and some mullions removed. The barn to the right dates from the mid to late 18th century, and contains a central segmental-arched cart entrance and a doorway, both with quoined surrounds.
Day Ash House and two rear blocks 54.01846°N 1.72212°W	—	Mid 18th century	A house in gritstone, with a stone slate roof, stone gable coping, and shaped kneelers. The main block has two storeys and three bays, and a lower two-bay range to the left. At the rear is a two-bay range at right angles, with one storey and an attic, linked to the main block by a wall and a two-storey one-bay block. The main block has a plinth, quoins, and floor and eaves bands. In the centre is a doorway in an architrave with a pulvinated frieze and a corniced pediment. The windows are sashes, the window above the doorway with a round arch, imposts and a keystone.
Field barn 54.01483°N 1.72281°W	—	Mid 18th century	The barn is in gritstone on a plinth, with quoins, and a stone slate roof with gable coping and shaped kneelers. There are three or four bays, and a rear outshut. On the south side is a doorway with a quoined surround, at the rear is a cart entrance, and in the left return are two byre doors.
Fogfield House and barn 54.02646°N 1.71261°W	—	Mid 18th century	The house and barn are in stone and have stone slate roofs with gable coping and shaped kneelers. The house has two storeys and three bays, with one bay added later tot the left. It contains quoins, and a round-headed doorway with a quoined surround. The windows in the original bays are casements, and in the added bay they are sashes. The barn has six bays, and contains a cart entrance with a flat arch, splayed voussoirs and a keystone with an arched recess above, and a doorway with tie-stone jambs.
Menwith Field House and barn 54.02476°N 1.71978°W	—	Mid 18th century	The house and barn are in gritstone, with quoins, and a stone slate roof with gable coping and shaped kneelers, and two storeys. The house has three bays, a central doorway with a quoined surround, and mullioned windows. The barn has four bays, and contains a segmental-arched cart entrance and byre doors, all with quoined jambs.
Southfield Farmhouse; 54.03023°N 1.67776°W		Mid 18th century	The house is in gritstone, with quoins, and a purple slate roof with a shaped kneeler. There are two storeys, a double depth plan, and three bays. The central doorway has an architrave, and the windows are mullioned.
Stocks; 54.03260°N 1.69421°W		18th century (probable)	The stocks consist of two gritstone posts about 1 metre (3 ft 3 in) high with rounded tops. These are grooved on the inside faces, and hold restored wooden boards with two holes for legs.
Darley Mill House; 54.03291°N 1.70596°W	—	1767	The house is roughcast, and has a stone slate roof with gable copings and a shaped kneeler. There are two storeys and three bays. The doorway has an architrave with a keystone and a broken pediment, and most of the windows are sashes.
Darley Mill and chimney 54.03319°N 1.70592°W		Late 18th to mid 19th century	A range of cornmill buildings in gritstone with stone slate roofs. They consist of an engine house with two storeys and four bays, the mill building with three storeys, six bays, a projecting two-storey porch and a loading bay wing with two round arches, and a barn and byres of five bays. At the rear is a large waterwheel, and a truncated chimney with a square base and a moulded base to a circular shaft about 10 metres (33 ft) high.
Laburnum House and barn 54.03155°N 1.70351°W	—	Late 18th to mid 19th century	The house and barn are in gritstone, with quoins, and a stone slate roof with gable coping and shaped kneelers, and two storeys. The house has three bays, and contains a central doorway with a quoined surround. The barn to the right is lower, with five bays, and contains a cart entrance with a segmental arch, byre doors and pitching doors.
Wesleyan Chapel; 54.03149°N 1.70256°W	—	1829	The chapel is in gritstone, and has a stone slate roof with kneelers returned as eaves bands, and coped gables. It is five bays deep, with two storeys, and the entrance in the gable end. This contains a central doorway, two windows above, and a datestone with a biblical quotation.
