= Dacre railway station =

Disused railway station in North Yorkshire, England

Dacre
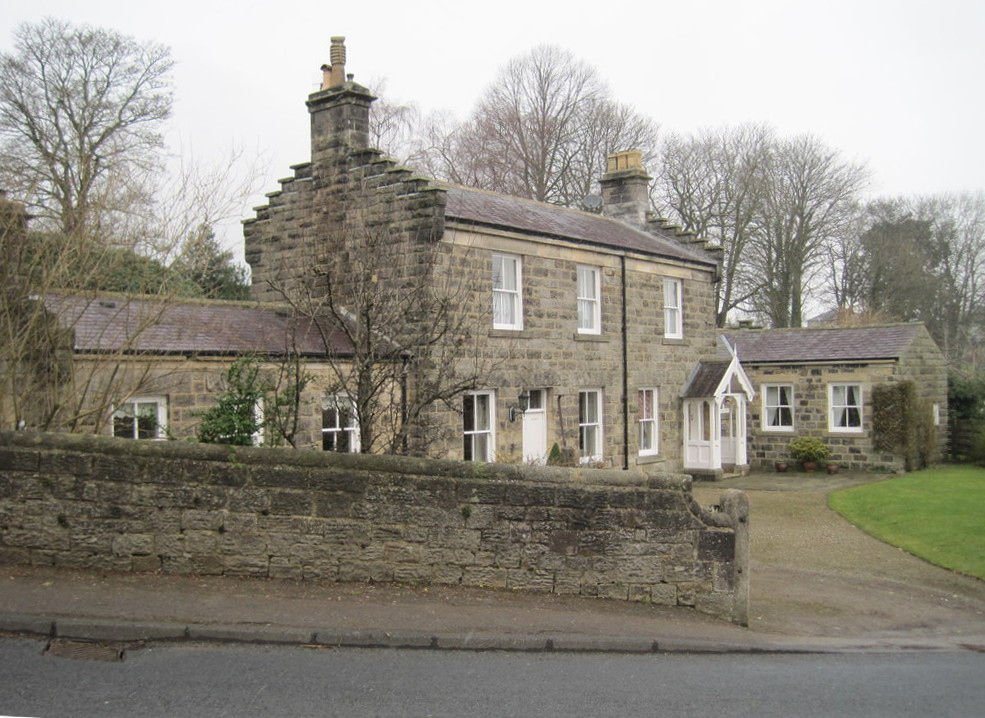
- Station building and forecourt (2013)

General information
- Location: Dacre, North Yorkshire; England
- Coordinates: 54.0523°N 1.7021°W
- Grid reference: SE196618
- Platforms: 1

Other information
- Status: Disused

History
- Original company: North Eastern Railway
- Pre-grouping: North Eastern Railway
- Post-grouping: London and North Eastern Railway

Key dates
- 1 May 1862: Opened
- 2 April 1951: Closed to passengers
- 31 October 1964: Closed to freight
Location

Dacre railway station served the villages of Dacre and Summerbridge, North Yorkshire, England from 1862 to 1951 on the Nidd Valley Railway.

== History ==
The station opened as Dacre Banks on 1 May 1862 on the Nidd Valley line, part of the North Eastern Railway. The station was renamed Dacre in 1866. The station was closer to Summerbridge than to Dacre, and that part of Dacre close to the station is called Dacre Banks. Dacre was one of the two important intermediate stations on the branch (the other being Birstwith). As such there was a two-storey station building, with single-storey wings at each end, and constructed of local stone to the designs of NER Architect Thomas Prosser. This included accommodation for the Station Master, a ticket office and waiting room. WC facilities were later improved by the addition of timber buildings at the southern (Darley) end. At the northern end of the station was the goods yard, with a warehouse, coal cells and a brick signal cabin, added about 1881. As at Birstwith there was a loop off the single line, but this was only for the use of freight trains, the line at the platform being single.

The station was host to a LNER camping coach from 1936 to 1939 and may have had a coach visiting in 1934.

The station closed to passengers on 2 April 1951.

The line and station closed to goods traffic on 2 November 1964. The station building and the goods warehouse both still stand and have been converted for residential use. New housing has been built on the remainder of the yard; the signal cabin gave its name to Cabin Lane at the north end of the site.

Preceding station	Historical railways	Following station
Pateley Bridge; Line and station closed	Nidd Valley Railway	Darley; Line and station closed
