= Scotgate Ash Quarry =

Disused quarry in North Yorkshire, England

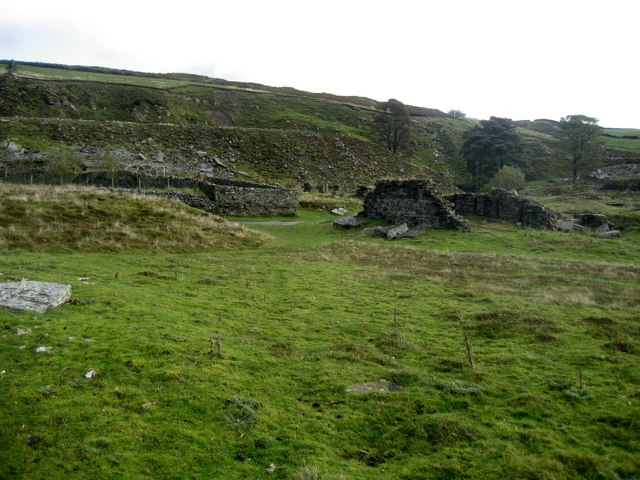
- Disused Quarries at Scotgate Ash

- Location within North Yorkshire
- Location: Pateley Bridge, North Yorkshire, England; 54°05′41″N 1°45′22″W
- Products: Building stone, flags
- Opened: By 1351
- Closed: 1915

Scotgate Ash Quarry or Scot Gate Ash Quarry, (Note: Most sources list the name of as being Scotgate Ash. Modern Mapping shows the area as Scot Gate Ash.) was the collective name for extensive quarry workings that were on the northern edge of Pateley Bridge, North Yorkshire, England. When the quarry was last in use, the area was in the West Riding of Yorkshire, and was described as being the largest quarry in West Yorkshire. (Note: Until the boundary changes in 1974, Pateley Bridge was in the historic county of the West Riding of Yorkshire. Post 1974, it has been in North Yorkshire.)

After 1872, building stone from Scotgate Ash was exported from the quarry site firstly by incline into the town of Pateley Bridge and thence by train on the Nidd Valley Railway (NVR). Because of its durability and hard-wearing nature, Scotgate Ash stone was used in building the platforms at many mainline railway stations in the United Kingdom, as well as being in demand as a building stone, not only in the locality, but also at a national level with many significant buildings in London using Scotgate Ash stone.

== History ==
Between the early 14th century and 1915, Scotgate Ash Quarry above the northern edge of Pateley Bridge, supplied Dimension stone (which was known commercially as Delph Stone) that was used in many buildings in Yorkshire and London. The stone was particularly prized as an edging stone for railway platforms and was used at York, Scarborough, Holyhead, London Victoria and London Paddington railway stations.

The Metcalfe family, who were landholders in the locality, had a major stake in Scot Gate Ash Quarry and by 1880, because of their influence, the quarry was the largest in the West Riding of Yorkshire. The Metcalfe's installed a standard gauge inclined tramway in 1872 to transport the stone down the hill to the goods sidings west of Pateley Bridge railway station. The incline lowered the stone over a height of 600 feet (180 m) and over a distance of 3,900 feet (1,200 m). The incline had many escape routes and, like many inclines in Britain, the loaded wagons moving downhill forced empty wagons to ascend the incline on the other line. The incline bottom connected directly into the NVR sidings with an additional spur onto the Nidd Valley Light Railway. The incline crossed Corporation Road in the town before joining the branchline sidings at Millfield Street. The opening of the incline allowed stone to be transported into Pateley Bridge in a matter of minutes instead of several hours by horse and cart.

The quarry produced flags and stone, which were from the Libishaw Sandstone bed. This stone was also used in the building of Scar House Reservoir further up the valley. Libishaw Sandstone is described as "fine to medium-grained, micaeous, feldspathic, thin bedded sandstone of variable colour (buff, brown, pale yellow, and grey) was quarried widely in the C19 on the north side of Pateley Bridge". Blocks and flags could be as large as 16 square feet (1.5 m^{2}) and 16 inches (410 mm) deep. Some of the stone was won by mining rather than surface quarrying and whilst spoil heaps are still in evidence, any mining shafts have been filled in. By 1889, seven distinct working areas were spread out across the hill above Pateley Bridge, all operating as Scotgate Ash Quarry.

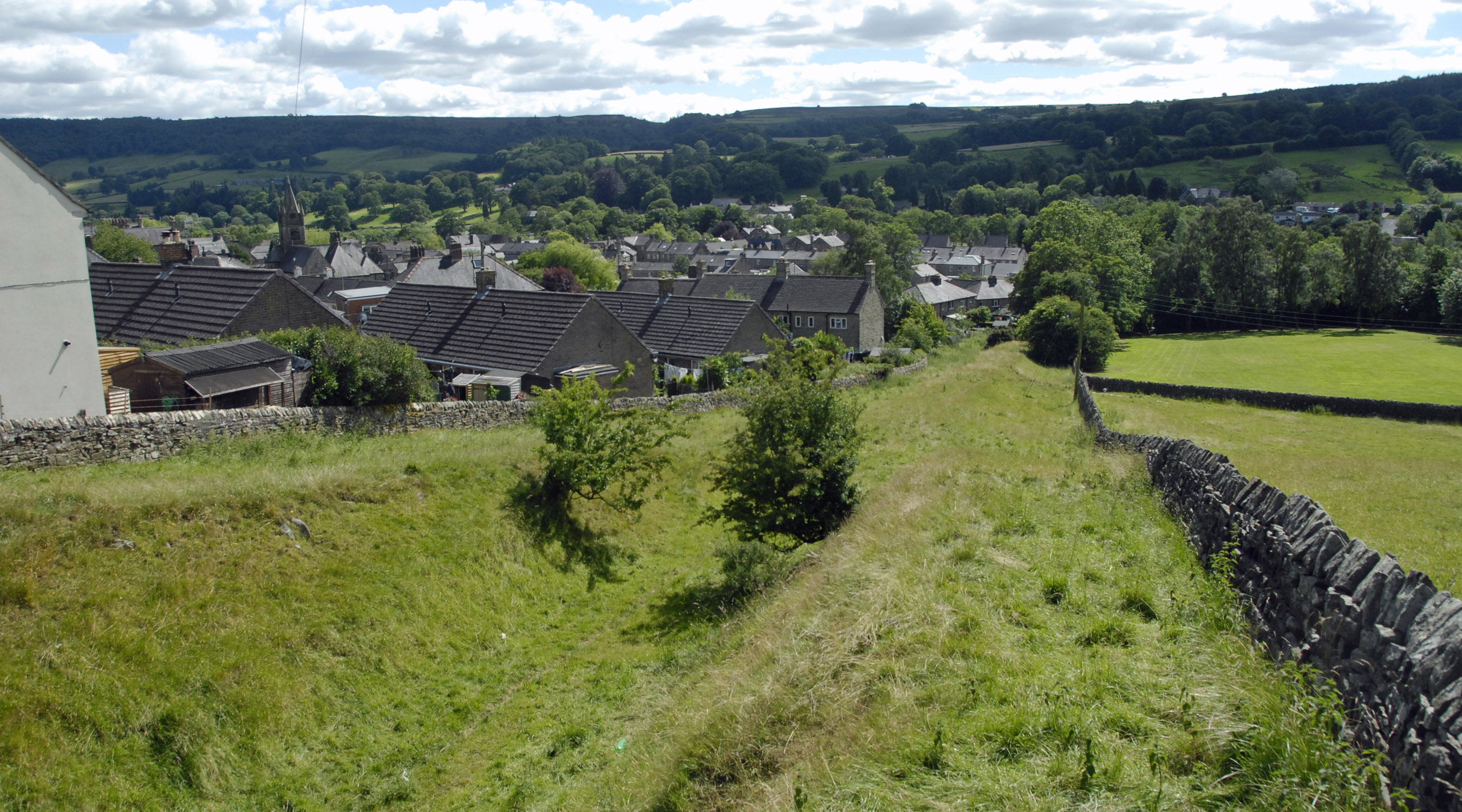
Incline looking south at Pateley Bridge, North Yorkshire. This was the incline railway that served the former Scotgate Ash quarry workings

The arrival of the railway in Pateley Bridge in 1862, afforded the quarry owners the ability to export the stone from the dale for the first time. Scotgate Ash stone was used in building the National Gallery, the National Safe Deposit Bank and Kensington Museum in London and the government works at Aldershot, Enfield, Plymouth, Portsmouth and York. It was also used extensively for many buildings in Harrogate, the Station Hotel in York, and for post offices in Newcastle, Sunderland and Durham. Other uses included steps for public buildings and edging stones for dockyards and harbours because of its high resistance to crushing.

At the height of the quarrying operations in the 1890s, the quarry workings stretched out along the northern flank of Pateley Bridge for over 0.62 miles (1 km). Five steam cranes were in operation and the workings employed over 500 men and boys. In October 1892, the valley suffered from extreme rainfall which caused huge rockfalls in the quarry area and the resultant flooding destroyed the incline.

English Heritage have described the site remains as "striking". The incline survives (and is shown on mapping) along with various buildings (the manager's office, drum house for the incline, etc.) and a reservoir at the eastern edge of the site. Access to the site is easily available as it, and the former incline course, are both on public footpaths.
