= Hampsthwaite railway station =

Disused railway station in North Yorkshire, England

Hampsthwaite
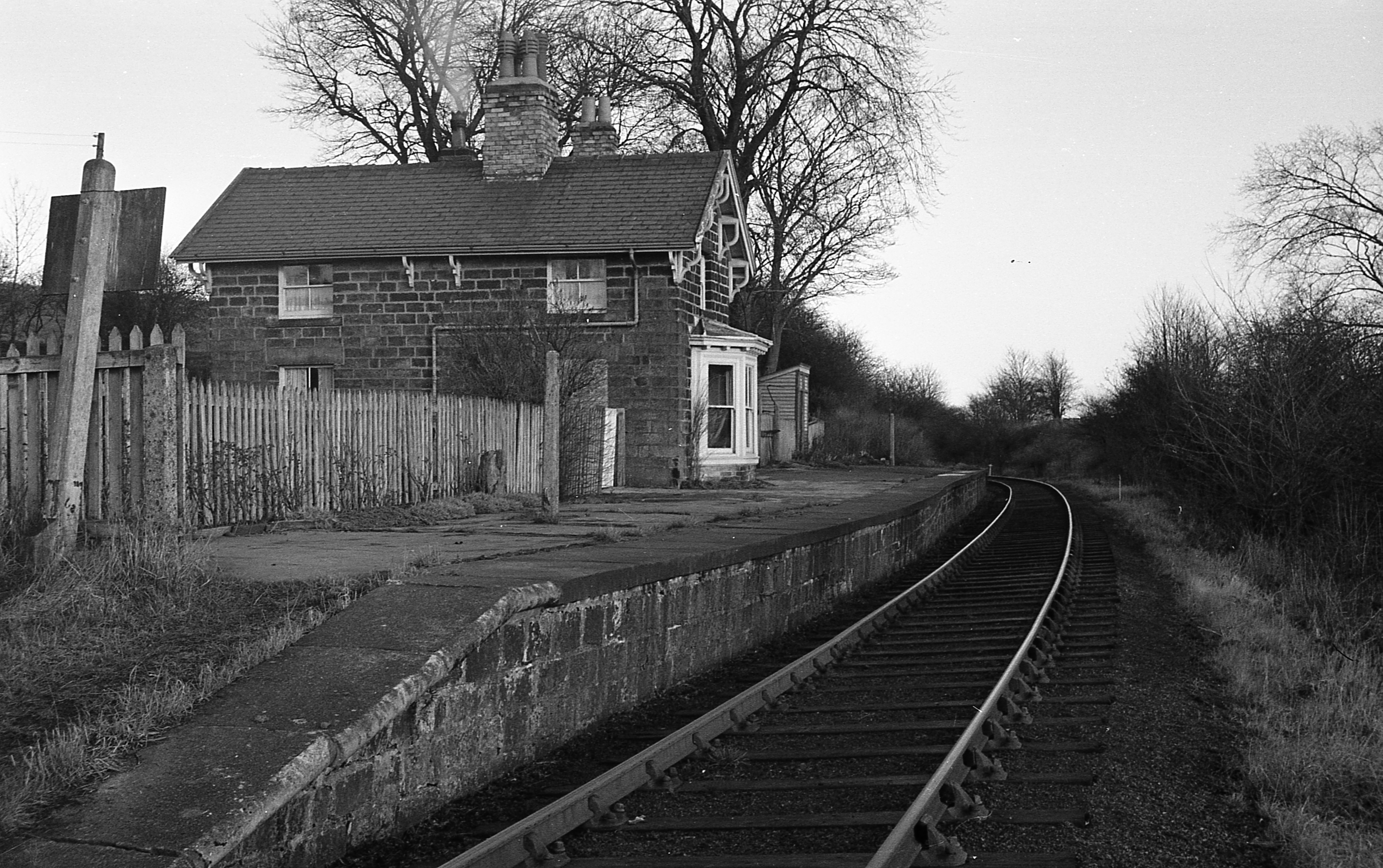

General information
- Location: Hampsthwaite, North Yorkshire; England
- Coordinates: 54.029°N 1.599°W
- Grid reference: SE263593
- Platforms: 1

Other information
- Status: Disused

History
- Original company: North Eastern Railway
- Pre-grouping: North Eastern Railway
- Post-grouping: LNER

Key dates
- 1 July 1866: Opened
- 2 January 1950: Closed
Location

Hampsthwaite railway station served the village of Hampsthwaite, North Yorkshire, England from 1866 to 1950 on the Nidd Valley Railway.

== History ==
The station was opened on 1 July 1866 by the North Eastern Railway. Tenders for its construction were invited in 1864 after authorisation in August of that year; despite being an attractive design by Thomas Prosser, the NER Architect, it was not like his characteristic stepped-gable stone stations at Ripley, Birstwith, Dacre and Pateley Bridge. There were never any freight facilities at Hampsthwaite, local goods traffic being handled at Birstwith or Ripley. The station was closed to both passengers and parcels traffic on 2 January 1950; the line closed to passengers in April 1951.

The station building remains and has been converted to residential use.

Preceding station	Disused railways	Following station
Birstwith; Line and station closed	Nidd Valley Railway	Ripley Valley; Line and station closed
