= Providence Chapel, Dacre =

Chapel in Dacre, North Yorkshire, England

Coordinates: 54°02′38″N 1°42′27″W

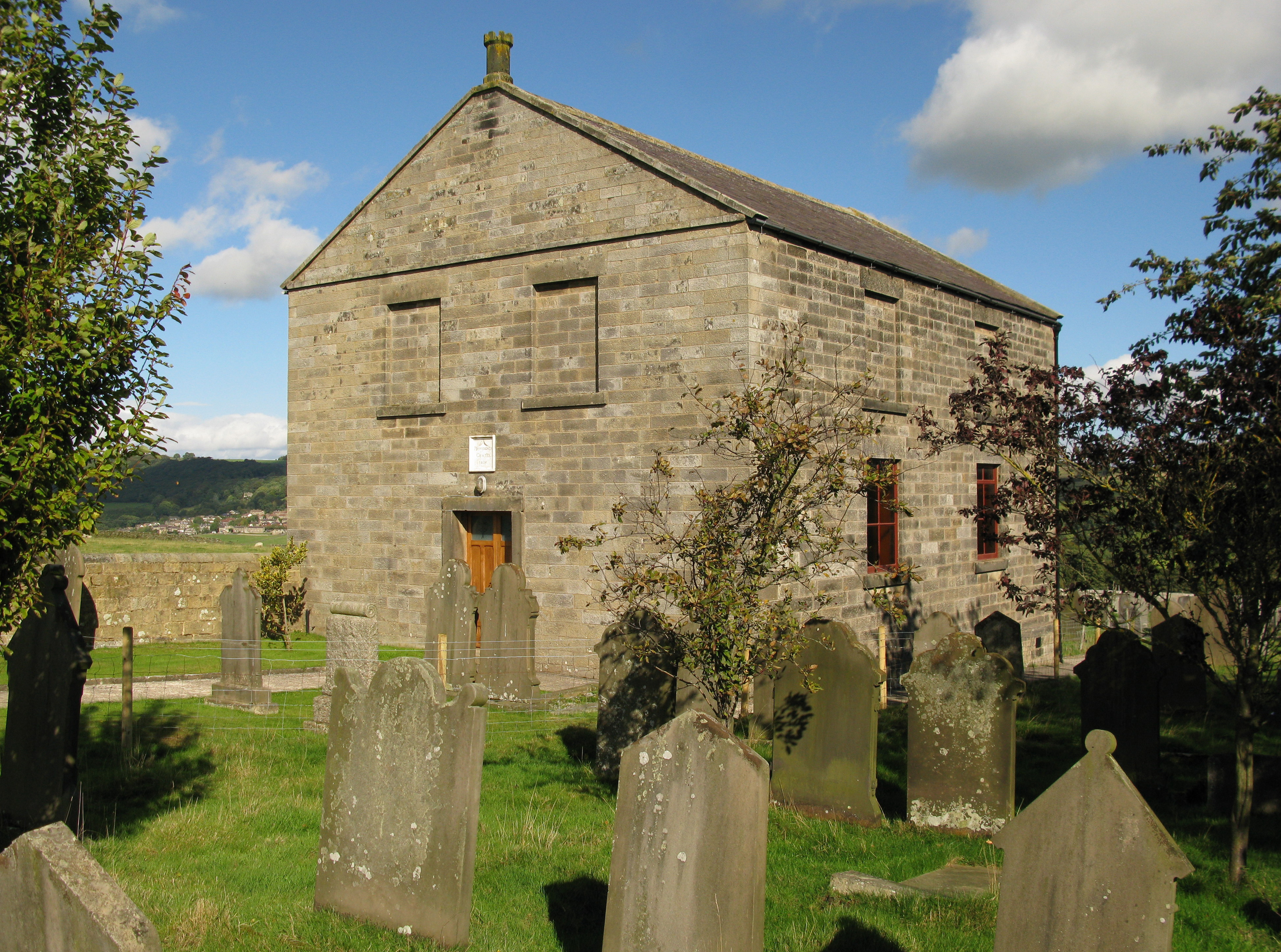
The building, in 2010

Providence Chapel is a place of worship in Dacre, North Yorkshire, a village in England.

The chapel was opened on 27 September 1827, as an independent congregationalist church. It cost £280 to construct, and could seat approximately 400 worshippers. The building was renovated in 1896, from which time date most of the fixtures and fittings. In 1972, the chapel affiliated to the new United Reformed Church. In 1984, Salem Chapel in Pateley Bridge closed, and its congregation transferred to Providence Chapel. The building was grade II listed in 1986.

The chapel is built of stone on a plinth with a purple slate roof. It has two storeys, and the entrance front facing the street has two bays and a coped gable with a band at the eaves level. In the centre is a doorway with a stone surround and tie stones, and above it is a stone plaque with a moulded surround, an inscription and the date. In the upper storey are two rectangular recesses with lintels and sills. On the sides are windows in the lower storeys and blind recesses above.

== See also ==
- Listed buildings in Dacre, North Yorkshire
