= Listed buildings in Hampsthwaite =

Hampsthwaite is a civil parish in the county of North Yorkshire, England. It contains 19 listed buildings that are recorded in the National Heritage List for England. All the listed buildings are designated at Grade II, the lowest of the three grades, which is applied to "buildings of national importance and special interest". The parish contains the village of Hampsthwaite and the surrounding countryside. The listed buildings include houses, cottages and associated structures, farmhouses and farm buildings, a church, a table tomb and a sundial shaft in the churchyard, two bridges, a former watermill, a sundial, a milepost, a telephone kiosk, and a mounting block.

== Buildings ==
Name and location	Photograph	Date	Notes
St Thomas a Becket's Church; 54.02673°N 1.60537°W		15th century	The oldest part of the church is the tower, with the rest of the church rebuilt in 1901–02 by C. Hodgson Fowler. It is built in gritstone with a grey slate roof, and consists of a nave, a south aisle, a south porch, a chancel with a south vestry, and a west tower. The tower has three stages, stepped diagonal buttresses, and a west doorway in Gothic style with a moulded surround, above which is a three-light Perpendicular window, and on the south face is a three-light window; all the openings have hood moulds. The bell openings have three lights, and above is an eaves string course, an embattled parapet with central triangular pilasters, and a weathervane. The porch entrance has a chamfered surround, and inside it are medieval and 17th-century inscriptions and tomb slabs.
Hampsthwaite Bridge; 54.02767°N 1.60360°W		1640	The bridge, which carries Church Lane over the River Nidd, is in gritstone, and consists of three segmental arches with the voussoirs set back slightly. It has triangular cutwaters, chamfered at the top, carried up as pedestrian recesses, and corbels carrying the overhanging parapet.
Cockhill Packhorse Bridge; 54.02354°N 1.60487°W		17th century (probable)	The bridge, which crosses Cockhill Beck, is in gritstone. It consists of a single arch, with plain parapets, and coping stones tied by iron staples set in lead.
Saltergate Hill Farmhouse; 54.00948°N 1.59694°W	—	Mid-17th century	The farmhouse, which has been partly rebuilt, is in gritstone, and has a stone slate roof with a shaped kneeler and gable coping to the north, and hipped elsewhere. There are two storeys and an L-shaped plan, with an east range of three bays, and a south range of two bays. The windows throughout are mullioned, some with hood moulds. In the centre of the east wing is a doorway with a chamfered surround, and at the rear are quoins.
The Grange and barn 54.02234°N 1.60801°W	—	Mid to late 17th century	The house and attached barn are in gritstone, with quoins, and a stone slate roof with a bulbous kneeler and gable coping on the left. There are two storeys, the house has three bays and the barn on the left has three bays. The house has a doorway with moulded quoined jambs, and a triangular soffit to the lintel, and to the left is a later doorway with an alternate quoined surround. Most of the windows are mullioned, with some mullions missing, there is a blocked circular window, and a continuous hood mould over the ground floor openings. The barn has a byre door and a cart entrance.
Sundial shaft in churchyard 54.02665°N 1.60538°W	—	1672	The sundial shaft in the churchyard of St Thomas a Becket's Church, to the south of the church, is in gritstone, and is about 1 metre (3 ft 3 in) in height. At the base it is square, and above it is chamfered with pyramidal stops at the tops and the bottoms. The chamfers are decorated in relief, at the top are various motifs, and on the east face is the date.
Grove House and Rowden House; 54.02170°N 1.60894°W	—	1676	A house later extended and divided into two, it is in gritstone with quoins on the right, and a purple slate roof. There are two storeys and three bays. The main doorway has moulded quoined jambs and a triangular soffit to the dated and inscribed lintel. The windows are mullioned.
Hookstone Garth; 54.01944°N 1.61439°W	—	1692 or earlier	The house is in gritstone, with quoins and a grey slate roof. There are two storeys and four bays. To the right is a blocked doorway, with an inserted window, moulded jambs, and a triangular soffit to the lintel with incised scrolls in the spandrels and a recessed initialled and dated panel. To the left is a later inserted doorway, and the windows are mullioned with varied fenestration.
Table tomb 54.02665°N 1.60533°W	—	1702	The table tomb is in the churchyard of St Thomas a Becket's Church, to the south of the church. It is in gritstone, and consists of a large slab with moulded edges on six pillars. Each pillar has a square section, a moulded foot and cap, and a projecting central band. The inscription is weathered.
Laurel Cottage; 54.02431°N 1.60569°W	—	1764	The cottage is in pink and brown gritstone, with quoins, and a stone slate roof with bulbous kneelers and gable copings. There are two storeys and three bays. The central doorway has a chamfered tie-stone surround, above which is a dated and initialled plaque, and a small round-arched window. The other windows are sashes.
The Old Parsonage; 54.02457°N 1.60492°W	—	Mid to late 18th century	The house is in gritstone on a plinth, with quoins, and a hipped slate roof. The main block has three storeys and three bays, and to the left is a bay of the same height with two bays. The doorway has a quoined surround and a keystone, The windows are sashes, apart from the top floor of the main block, which contains top-hung casements.
Thompsons Garth and Mally's Cottage; 54.02253°N 1.60829°W	—	Mid to late 18th century	A house and an outbuilding converted into a cottage, the outbuilding older, with the house dating from the early to mid-19th century; thery are both in gritstone. The house has two storeys and three bays and a grey slate roof with shaped kneelers and gable copings. It has a doorway with a fanlight, and to the left is a canted bay window. To the right is a shop doorway converted into a window, and on the upper floor are sash windows. The cottage on the left has a single storey, two bays and a pantile roof.
High Stores House; 54.02260°N 1.60813°W	—	Late 18th century	Three cottages, later one house, in gritstone, with three bays. The left bay has two storeys and a cellar, and a pantile roof. Steps lead down to the cellar, above it is a canted bay window, and on the top floor is a casement window. The middle bay has three storeys, and a stone slate roof with gable copings and shaped kneelers. It contains a three-storey bay window, and a sash window to the left. The right bay has two storeys and a slate roof, and contains a doorway and sash windows.
Manor Farmhouse; 54.02453°N 1.60527°W	—	Early 19th century	The house is in gritstone, with quoins, and a grey slate roof with shaped kneelers and gable copings. On the front is a gabled porch, and the windows are sashes.
The Old Mill; 54.02159°N 1.60816°W	—	Early 19th century	A watermill, later converted for residential use, it is in gritstone, with quoins, stone gutter brackets, and a grey slate roof with stone slates at the eaves, shaped kneelers and gable copings. There are three storeys and four bays. On the front is a doorway and the windows are casements.
Sundial, The Old Parsonage; 54.02449°N 1.60484°W	—	Early to mid-19th century	The sundial is in gritstone. It has a circular base with a square block, on which is a bulbous vase baluster with roll moulding at the neck. On the top is a cap stone and an inscribed bronze gnomon.
Milepost; 54.00605°N 1.61077°W		Mid-19th century	The milepost on the north side of the A59 road is in gritstone with a cast iron plate. It has a triangular plan, it is about 80 centimetres (31 in) in height, and it has a rounded top. On the top is inscribed "SKIPTON & KNARESBOROUGH ROAD" and "HAMPSTHWAITE", on the left face are the distances to Harrogate and Knaresborough and on the right side the distance to Skipton.
Telephone kiosk 54.02405°N 1.60580°W		1935	The telephone kiosk in High Street is of the K6 type designed by Giles Gilbert Scott. Constructed in cast iron with a square plan and a dome, it has three unperforated crowns in the top panels.
Mounting block 54.02425°N 1.60455°W	—	Undated	The mounting block by the side of a footpath is in gritstone. It consists of three worn steps on each side of a central slab set on edge, and is about 1.5 metres (4 ft 11 in) in width, and 80 centimetres (31 in) in height.
