= Hampsthwaite =

Village and civil parish in North Yorkshire, England

Coordinates: 54.02365°N 1.60616°W

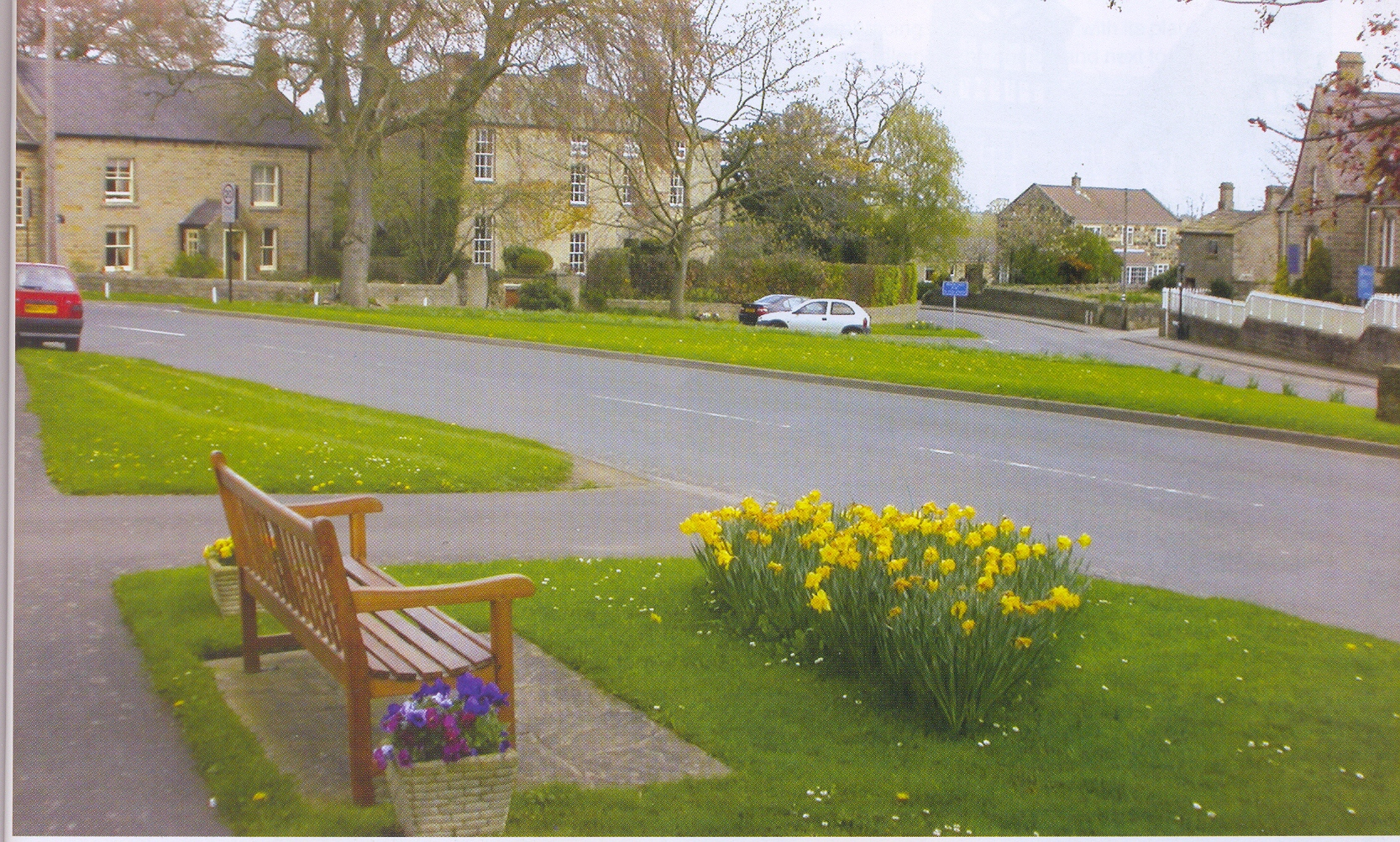
- Hampsthwaite Village Green

- Location within North Yorkshire
- Population: 1,083 (2011 Census)
- OS grid reference: SE259587
- Civil parish: Hampsthwaite
- Unitary authority: North Yorkshire
- Ceremonial county: North Yorkshire
- Region: Yorkshire and the Humber
- Country: England
- Sovereign state: United Kingdom
- Post town: HARROGATE
- Postcode district: HG3
- Dialling code: 01423
- Police: North Yorkshire
- Fire: North Yorkshire
- Ambulance: Yorkshire

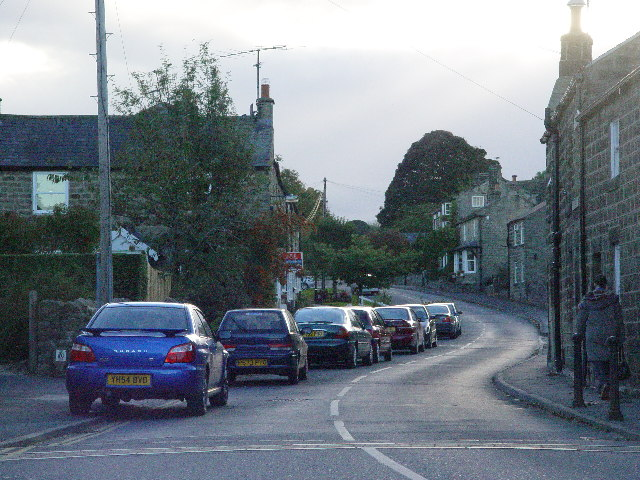
Street in Hampsthwaite

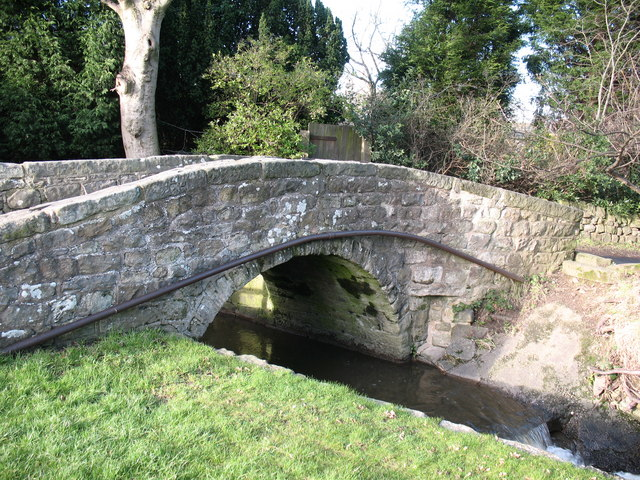
Packhorse bridge in Hampsthwaite

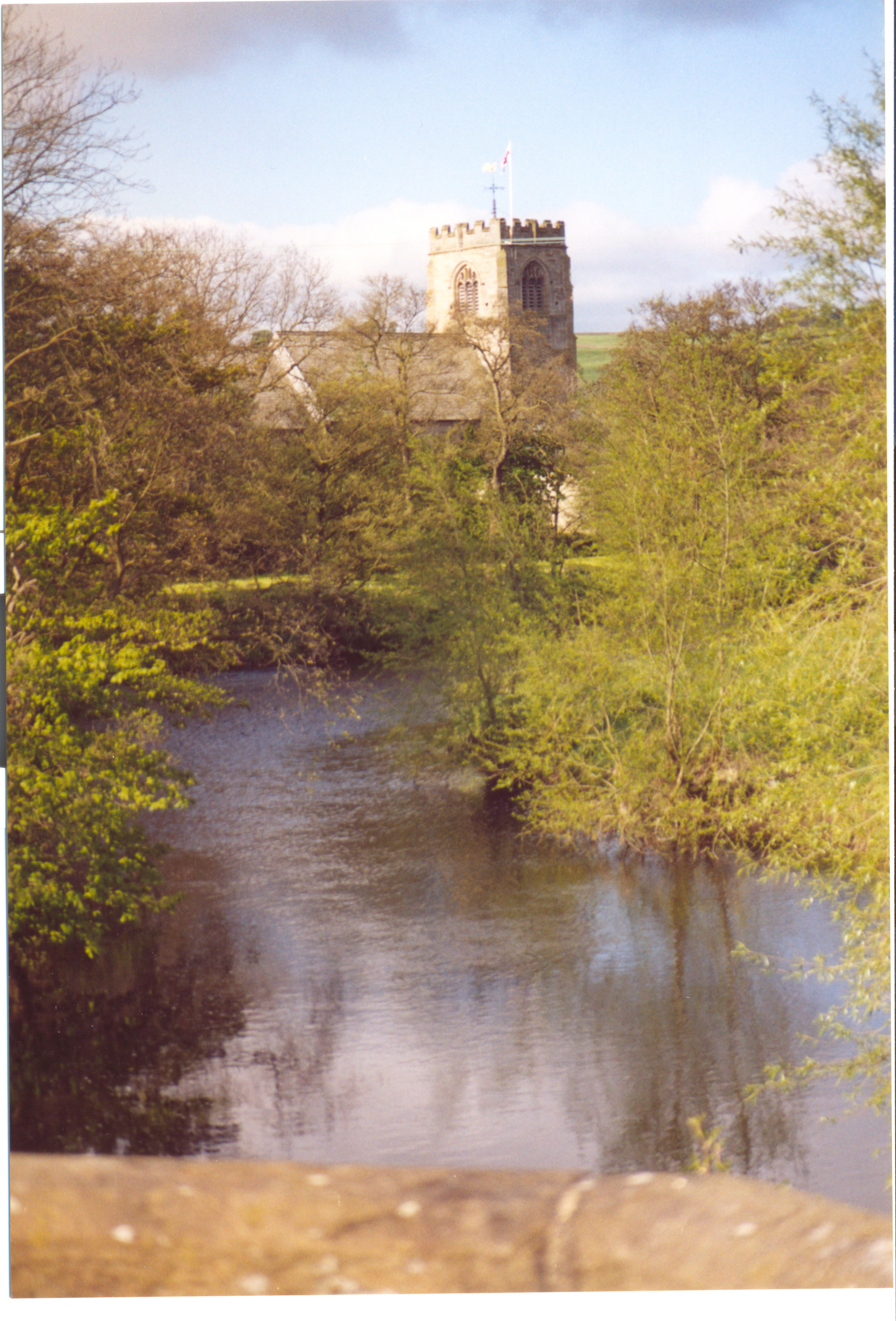
Church of St Thomas a'Becket from Hampsthwaite Bridge

Hampsthwaite is a large village and civil parish in Nidderdale in the county of North Yorkshire, England. It lies on the south bank of the River Nidd 5 miles (8 km) north west of Harrogate. In the 2011 census the parish had a population of 1,083.

The centre of the village is designated as a Conservation Area. Hampsthwaite lies just outside the Nidderdale National Landscape, but the area to the north and west of the village is recognised as an Area of Great Landscape Value.

== History ==
The toponym is of Old Norse origin, and means "clearing (thwaite) of a man named Hamal".

In 1304, Edward I granted a charter to Hampsthwaite to hold an annual market and fair on the Feast of St Thomas the Martyr. The ancient parish of Hampsthwaite covered a wide area, and included the townships of Birstwith, Felliscliffe, Menwith with Darley and Thornthwaite with Padside. All these places became separate civil parishes in 1866.

Between 1875 and March 1951 the village had a station on the Nidd Valley Railway between Harrogate and Pateley Bridge.

Until 1974 it was part of the West Riding of Yorkshire. From 1974 to 2023 it was part of the Borough of Harrogate; it is now administered by the unitary North Yorkshire Council.

== Amenities ==
Hampsthwaite has a Village Room, the Memorial Hall for larger events, a shop, a pub, the Joiners' Arms, and Hampsthwaite Church of England Primary School (established in 1860).

=== Church ===
St Thomas a Becket's Church, Hampsthwaite is the Anglican parish church. The tower is from the 15th century but the remainder was restored in Perpendicular style in 1902. It is a Grade II listed building.

=== Football Clubs ===
Hampsthwaite and Birstwith Junior Football Club is run for the benefit of girls and boys aged 6 to 11 living or attending school in the Hampsthwaite and Birstwith area. Saturday-morning coaching sessions are run in Hampsthwaite on Feast Field.

Hampsthwaite United Football Club has been known to exist since approximately 1954. Recent honours include the Harrogate & District Football League Division Two Championship in 2013 & Division One in 2015. The Club now plays in the West Yorkshire Association Football League, Tier 13 of the National League System.

== Notable residents ==
- Leeds brewer Joshua Tetley was buried in Hampsthwaite in 1859.
- Thomas Thackeray (1693–1760) was born in Hampsthwaite, the son of a yeoman of the parish, and was the great-grandfather of the author William Makepeace Thackeray.
- The family of Amy Woodforde-Finden (1860–1919), who was best known as the composer of Kashmiri Song from The Four Indian Love Lyrics, poems by Laurence Hope, lived in Hampsthwaite. Amy was buried here, and a memorial to her, a recumbent figure in white marble, is in the parish church. In commemoration of Amy an annual music festival is held at St Thomas à Becket Church.

== See also ==
- Listed buildings in Hampsthwaite
