= Listed buildings in Thornthwaite with Padside =

Thornthwaite with Padside is a civil parish in the county of North Yorkshire, England. It contains twelve listed buildings that are recorded in the National Heritage List for England. All the listed buildings are designated at Grade II, the lowest of the three grades, which is applied to "buildings of national importance and special interest". The parish contains the village of Thornthwaite, the hamlet of Padside, and the surrounding countryside. Most of the listed buildings are houses, farmhouses and associated structures, and the others include a church, a sundial in the churchyard, and a former corn mill and mill house.

== Buildings ==
Name and location	Photograph	Date	Notes
Padside Hall and wall 54.03636°N 1.77356°W	—	Late 16th to early 17th century	The house is in gritstone on a moulded plinth, with quoins, and stone slate roofs with shaped kneelers and gable coping. There are two storeys, and it consists of a hall range of three bays with a rear outshut, and a right cross-wing of five bays. The main doorway has a chamfered quoined surround, and the windows are mullioned, some with moulded hood moulds. On the left return is a cart entrance and pigeon holes. The courtyard wall is about 3 metres (9.8 ft) in height, and contains a central gateway with chamfered quoined jambs and a lintel with a four-centred arched head.
Padside Cottage; 54.03605°N 1.77362°W	—	Mid to late 17th century	The house is in gritstone, with quoins, and a stone slate roof with shaped kneelers and gable coping. There are two storeys and two bays. The central doorway has a chamfered quoined surround and a lintel with a shallow four-centred arched head. The windows are mullioned.
Roundabout Farmhouse and barn 54.02998°N 1.75523°W	—	Late 17th century	The house and attached barn are in gritstone, with quoins, and a stone slate roof with a bulbous kneeler and gable coping on the right. There are two storeys, and the house has a doorway with a quoined surround, and a chamfer carried across the lintel. The windows are mullioned, with some mullions removed, and over the ground floor openings is a continuous hood mould. The barn has three bays and contains a cart entrance, a byre door and a square opening.
Sundial; 54.02888°N 1.73738°W	—	1714	The sundial is in the churchyard of St Saviour's Church, to the south of the church. It is in gritstone and about 1.2 metres (3 ft 11 in) in height. The sundial has a square plinth, with moulding to the base of the shaft, which is square in the lower part, and chamfered to octagonal above. On the top is a moulded cap and the remains of a brass plate, with the gnomon missing.
Slade House; 54.01790°N 1.74257°W	—	Early to mid-18th century	The house is in gritstone, with quoins, and a stone slate roof with kneelers and gable coping. There are two storeys and three bays and an additional bay on the left. The doorway and the windows, which are sashes, have stone surrounds. On the left bay is a segmental-arched cart entrance, and under the eaves are parts of blocked windows.
Yates House; 54.03547°N 1.76849°W	—	Early to mid-18th century	The house, and flanking barns later incorporated into the house, are in gritstone, with quoins, floor bands, and a stone slate roof with kneelers and gable coping. There are two storeys, and the original house has three bays, and a central doorway in an architrave with a pulvinated frieze and a corniced pediment. Above the doorway is a semicircular-headed window with imposts and a keystone, and the other windows are mullioned. The former barn on the left has one bay, it contains a small cart entrance and a datestone, and on the left are external steps. The former barn to the right has a cart entrance and a datestone.
Chestnut Grove; 54.02529°N 1.73521°W	—	Mid 18th century and earlier	The house is in gritstone, with quoins, and a grey slate roof with shaped kneelers and gable coping. There are two storeys, a main block with two bays, and a lower four-bay range on the right. In the centre of the main range is a doorway with a plain surround, at the rear is a doorway with a quoined surround and a shallow four-centred arch, and the windows are mullioned.
Church Gate; 54.02626°N 1.73924°W	—	Mid 18th century	The house is in gritstone, with rusticated quoins, and a stone slate roof with shaped kneelers and gable coping. There are two storeys and three bays, and a single-storey bay on the left. The central doorway has an eared architrave, a pulvinated frieze and an entablature, and on the left bay is a doorway with a four-centred arched head. Above the main doorway is a single-light window, the other windows on the front are mullioned, and at the rear is a mullioned and transomed stair window.
Church House; 54.02911°N 1.73831°W	—	Mid-18th century	The house is in gritstone, with quoins, and a stone slate roof with shaped kneelers and gable coping. There are two storeys and two bays, and a two-bay extension on the right. In the centre is a doorway converted into a window, and the windows are mullioned, the window to the right of the former doorway converted into a doorway.
Low House; 54.03145°N 1.74924°W	—	1769	The house is in gritstone on a plinth, with quoins, shaped gutter brackets, and a stone slate roof with shaped kneelers and gable coping. There are two storeys, an attic and cellars. In the centre is a doorway with a projecting surround and a keystone, and above it is an initialled and dated stone plaque. The windows are mullioned, with some mullions removed, and on the attic on the right return is a Venetian window.
St Saviour's Church; 54.02898°N 1.73731°W		1810	The porch and bellcote were added to the church in about 1893. It is built in gritstone with a stone slate roof. The church consists of a nave and a chancel in one cell, and a west porch, and on the west gable is a gabled bellcote. At the west end are three two-light windows, an eaves band and a semicircular recess above. The other windows have pointed heads and Y-tracery.
Thornwaite Mill; 54.02646°N 1.72018°W	—	Early to mid-19th century	The former corn mill and mill house are in gritstone, and have a stone slate roof with shaped kneelers and gable coping. There are two storeys and about eight bays, the right bay projecting and gabled, with a wheelhouse at the rear, and the two-bay house to the right. On the front are doorways and sash windows.
