= Listed buildings in Dacre, North Yorkshire =

Dacre is a civil parish in the county of North Yorkshire, England. It contains 16 listed buildings that are recorded in the National Heritage List for England. All the listed buildings are designated at Grade II, the lowest of the three grades, which is applied to "buildings of national importance and special interest". The parish contains the settlements of Dacre and Dacre Banks, and the surrounding countryside. Most of the listed buildings are houses and associated structures, and the others include a burial ground, a public house, a chapel and a sundial in its grounds, a church and a water pump.

== Buildings ==
Name and location	Photograph	Date	Notes
Low Hall; 54.04727°N 1.69768°W		17th century	The house is in gritstone on a plinth, and has a stone slate roof with gable coping, elaborate shaped kneelers, and finials. There are two storeys and attics, and a main front of three gabled bays. The doorway has a moulded chamfered surround and a shallow four-centred arched head. The windows are recessed and chamfered, some have mullions, some also have transoms, and some have hood moulds.
Harewell Hall; 54.07125°N 1.72016°W		1662	The house is in gritstone, and has a Welsh slate roof with gable coping, shaped kneelers, and decorative finials. There are two storeys and three bays, the right bay projecting as a gabled wing. The doorway has a chamfered lintel and a hood mould, and above it is a recessed panel. Most of the windows are recessed with chamfered mullions, some with hood moulds. In the gable of the wing is a stepped three-light blind window.
Oxen Close; 54.03042°N 1.71753°W	—	Mid to late 17th century	A house in gritstone, with quoins, and a grey slate roof with a shaped kneeler and a coped gable on the left. There are two storeys and three bays. The doorway has a chamfered surround, a lintel with a defaced inscription, and a slab hood on brackets. The windows are mullioned, in the ground floor they are chamfered, and in the upper floor they have flat faces.
Quaker Burial Ground; 54.04129°N 1.71613°W		1682	Gritstone walls about 2 metres (6 ft 7 in) high enclose the burial ground, which is a rectangular enclosure about 10 metres (33 ft) by 15 metres (49 ft). The walls have large quoins on two corners, and flat capstones. The gateway has chamfered jambs and a dated lintel.
Gate Hill Farmhouse; 54.05466°N 1.70064°W		Late 17th to early 18th century	The house is in grey gritstone, with quoins, and a stone slate roof, hipped on the right, and with coped gables and moulded kneelers elsewhere. There are two storeys and an L-shaped plan, with a front range of three bays, and a rear wing on the right. The central doorway has a deep flat hood on moulded brackets. Above it is a single-light window, and the other windows on the front have chamfered mullions and three lights.
The Royal Oak Public House; 54.05286°N 1.70069°W		1752	The public house is in gritstone on a plinth, with rusticated quoins, a projecting floor band, and a stone slate roof with coped gables. There are three storeys and fronts of three bays. The original entrance, which has been converted into a window, has alternate quoins and a keystone. Above it is a round-arched window in an architrave, with imposts and a keystone, and the other windows are sashes with plain surrounds. The later entrance is in the left return.
Barn and byre, Lane Foot Farm; 54.05087°N 1.72592°W		1759	The barn and byre are in gritstone, with quoins, and a stone slate roof with coped gables and one remaining moulded kneeler. There are three bays and a single aisle. In the south side is a cart entrance with quoined jambs and a segmental arch with a dated keystone. The east end contains two doorways, one converted into a window, with quoined jambs and large flat lintels.
Eastwoods Farmhouse; 54.05453°N 1.71795°W	—	Early 18th century	The house is in gritstone on a plinth, with quoins, a floor band, and a roof of stone slate and grey slate, with gable coping and shaped kneelers. There are three storeys and three bays, a two-storey single-bay extension to the west, and a rear outshut. On the front is a doorway and flat-faced mullioned windows. At the rear is a stair tower and mullioned and transomed windows. In the extension is a square window and a re-set initialled stone.
Lane Foot Cottage; 54.05072°N 1.72597°W	—	Early to mid 18th century	A house and a barn in gritstone, with quoins, and stone slate roofs with gable coping and moulded kneelers. The house has two storeys and one bay, and contains a doorway with a quoined surround and three-light flat-faced mullioned windows. The barn is dated 1751, and has two bays. It contains a large central cart entrance and a byre door, and in the right return is a doorway with a dated and initialled lintel.
Dacre Hall; 54.04298°N 1.70623°W		Late 18th century	The house is in stone, with a moulded stone gutter, and a stone slate roof with gable coping. There are two storeys and three bays. Steps lead up to a central doorway with a reeded surround and a deep cornice, and the windows are sashes.
Pyefield House; 54.03849°N 1.69677°W		Late 18th century	The house is in gritstone, and has grey slate roofs with gable coping and shaped kneelers. There are two storeys, the main block has three bays, with a two-bay extension to the left, and a two-bay barn to the right incorporated into the house. In the centre of the main block is a doorway with a stone surround, sash windows, and a moulded stone gutter. The left extension has a stone gutter on brackets with an inserted window, and the former barn has a blocked cambered arch with an inserted window, and a blocked loading door.
Providence Chapel; 54.04386°N 1.70743°W		1827	The chapel is in stone on a plinth with a purple slate roof. There are two storeys, and the entrance front facing the street has two bays and a coped gable with a band at the eaves level. In the centre is a doorway with a stone surround and tie stones, and above it is a stone plaque with a moulded surround, an inscription and the date. In the upper storey are two rectangular recesses with lintels and sills. On the sides are windows in the lower storeys and blind recesses above.
Sundial, Providence Chapel; 54.04372°N 1.70750°W		1828	The sundial in the burial ground of the chapel is in gritstone and about 1.2 metres (3 ft 11 in) high. It has a circular base, a vase baluster with a moulded base, and roll moulding at the neck. The cap has incised numerals, initials and the date, and the gnomon is in bronze.
Barns, Pyefield House; 54.03867°N 1.69661°W		1828	The buildings consist of a barn and an attached, possibly earlier, hay barn at the rear. They are in gritstone with stone slate roofs, coped gables and shaped kneelers. The barn has three bays, a single-bay extension to the east, and a rear outshut. It contains a central double doorway with splayed voussoirs and a dated and initialled keystone, and byre doors, and in the extension is a cart entrance and a horizontally-sliding sash window. The hay barn has three bays, and contains a cart entrance and two pairs of tapering pillars.
Holy Trinity Church; 54.05638°N 1.69959°W		1837	The church is in stone with a purple slate roof, and is in Early English style. It consists of a five-bay nave with a south porch, a single-bay chancel, and a west tower. The tower has two stages, diagonal buttresses, a clock face on the south, lancet bell openings, and an embattled parapet. The porch has a coped gable, and a datestone above the lintel. The windows are lancets, and at the east end is a three-light window.
Pump; 54.05374°N 1.70116°W		Mid 19th century	The water pump is in cast iron, and about 1 metre (3 ft 3 in) high. It has a fluted column, a lion's head mask with a water spout, a projecting knob to the right, and a roll-moulded and fluted cap with a bud finial.
