= Darley Mill =

Mill building in Darley, North Yorkshire, England

Coordinates: 54.0332°N 1.7060°W

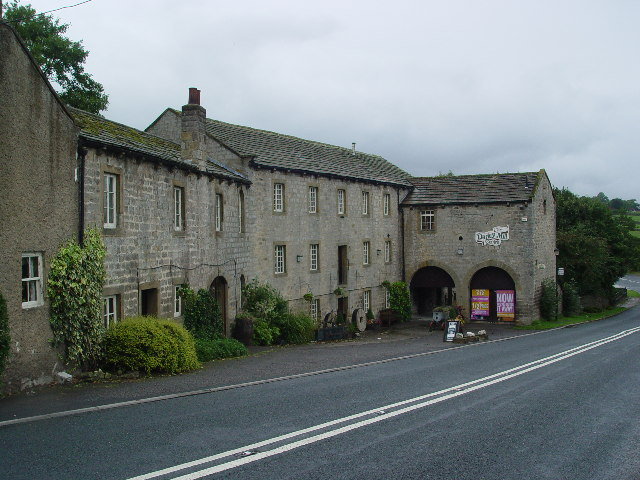
The mill, in 2005

Darley Mill is a historic building in Darley, a village in Nidderdale in North Yorkshire, England.

There has been a watermill on the site since the 17th century, but the current building dates from around 1800. The breastshot waterwheel dates from 1874. The building operated as a corn mill until the 1960s. In the 1980s, it was converted into a restaurant and shop, which was later taken over by the Yorkshire Linen Company. In 2016, the company closed, and the property was disused for several years. In 2018, planning permission was granted for its conversion into 13 houses, but this did no go ahead. Instead, in 2022, it was converted into nine houses, with 11 more constructed in the grounds.

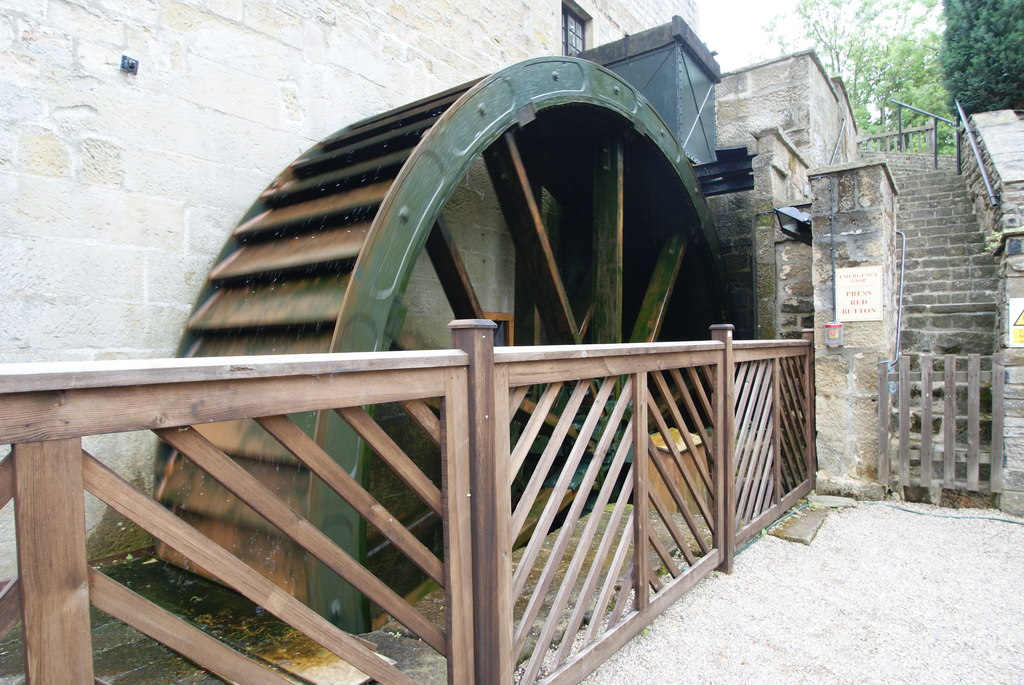
The waterwheel

A mill consists of a range of buildings in gritstone with stone slate roofs. They comprise an engine house with two storeys and four bays, the mill building with three storeys, six bays, a projecting two-storey porch and a loading bay wing with two round arches, and a barn and byres of five bays. At the rear is a large waterwheel, and a truncated chimney with a square base and a moulded base to a circular shaft about 10 metres (33 ft) high. Inside, there are cast iron columns and crossbeams, and there are unusual king post and queen post roofs. Some of the machinery survives, on the ground and first floors. The building has been grade II listed since 1987.

== See also ==
- Listed buildings in Darley and Menwith
