= Holy Trinity Church, Dacre Banks =

Church in Dacre Banks, North Yorkshire, England

Coordinates: 54°03′23″N 1°41′59″W

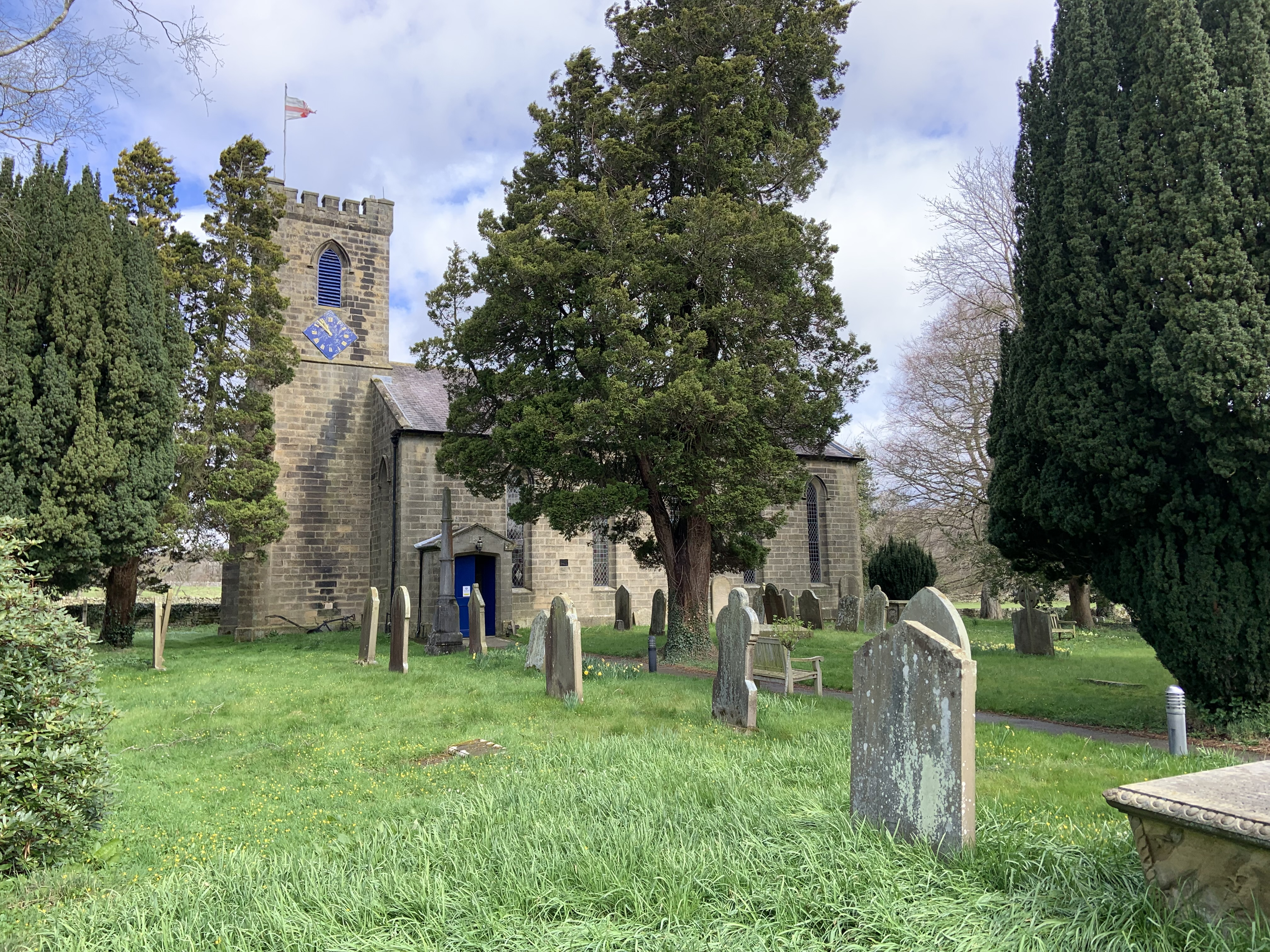
The church, in 2022

Holy Trinity Church is an Anglican church in Dacre Banks, a village in North Yorkshire in England.

The church was built in 1837, initially as a chapel of ease to Ripon Minster. Its design is said to be by a local woman. It was consecrated by the Bishop of Ripon in January 1838, and was given its own parish in 1839. The interior was altered in 1901, from which time date most of the fixtures and fittings, although the font may be original. The church was grade II listed in 1987.

The church is built of stone with a purple slate roof, and is in Early English style. It consists of a five-bay nave with a south porch, a single-bay chancel, and a west tower. The tower has two stages, diagonal buttresses, a clock face on the south, lancet bell openings, and an embattled parapet. The porch has a coped gable, and a datestone above the lintel. The windows are lancets, and at the east end is a three-light window.

== See also ==
- Listed buildings in Dacre, North Yorkshire
