= St Thomas a Becket's Church, Hampsthwaite =

Church in Hampsthwaite, North Yorkshire, England

Coordinates: 54.0268°N 1.6051°W

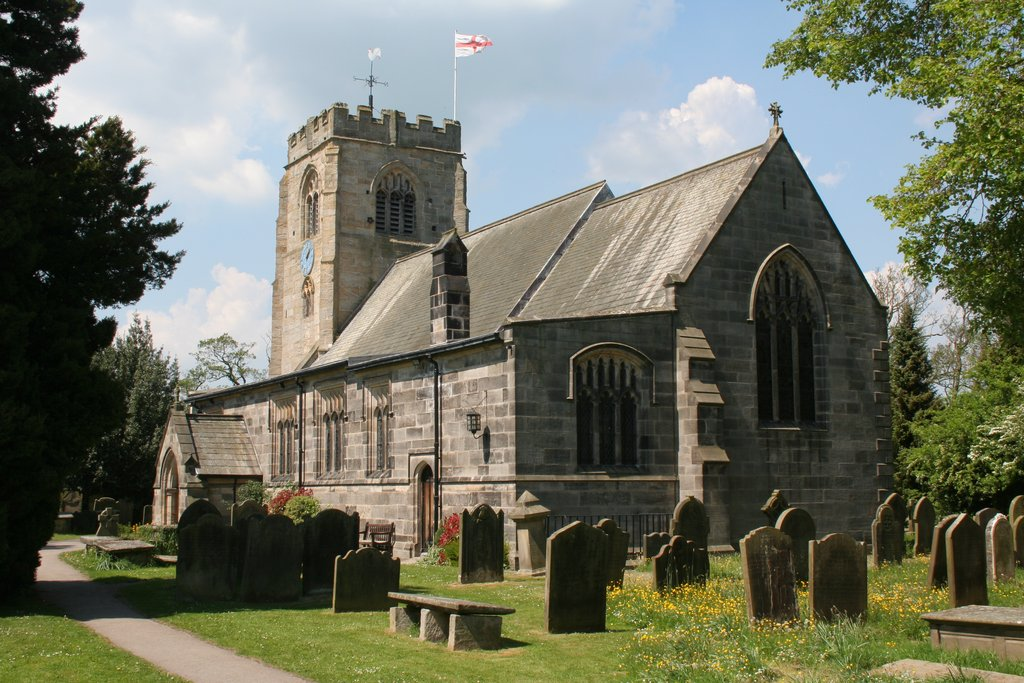
The church, in 2010

St Thomas a Becket's Church is the parish church of Hampsthwaite, a village in North Yorkshire, in England.

Numerous Saxon and Norman graveslabs have been found in the vicinity of the church, suggesting there was an early church building here. The first recorded church was built around 1180, probably on behalf of Hugh de Morville, Lord of Westmorland, one of the knights responsible for the murder of Thomas Becket. The church is believed to have been damaged during the First War of Scottish Independence and rebuilt later in the 14th century, with a new tower constructed in the 15th century. In 1820 the whole church other than the tower was demolished and rebuilt. It was again rebuilt in 1902, in the Perpendicular Gothic style, by C. Hodgson Fowler. The building was grade II listed in 1966.

The church is built of gritstone with a grey slate roof and consists of a nave, a south aisle, a south porch, a chancel with a south vestry and a west tower. The 15th-century tower has three stages, stepped diagonal buttresses and a west doorway in Gothic style with a moulded surround, above which is a three-light Perpendicular window, and on the south face is a three-light window; all the openings have hood moulds. The bell openings have three lights and above is an eaves string course, an embattled parapet with central triangular pilasters and a weathervane. The porch entrance has a chamfered surround and inside it are medieval and 17th-century inscriptions and tomb slabs.

Inside the church is a Norman font, 17th-century panelling in the south aisle, the 17th-century churchwarden's pew and two Elizabethan chairs. There is a memorial brass dating from about 1360 but dedicated to Andrew Dixon, who died in 1570, and a large white marble monument to Amy Woodforde-Finden, sculpted by George Edward Wade.

== See also ==
- Listed buildings in Hampsthwaite
