= Darley railway station =

Disused railway station in North Yorkshire, England

Darley
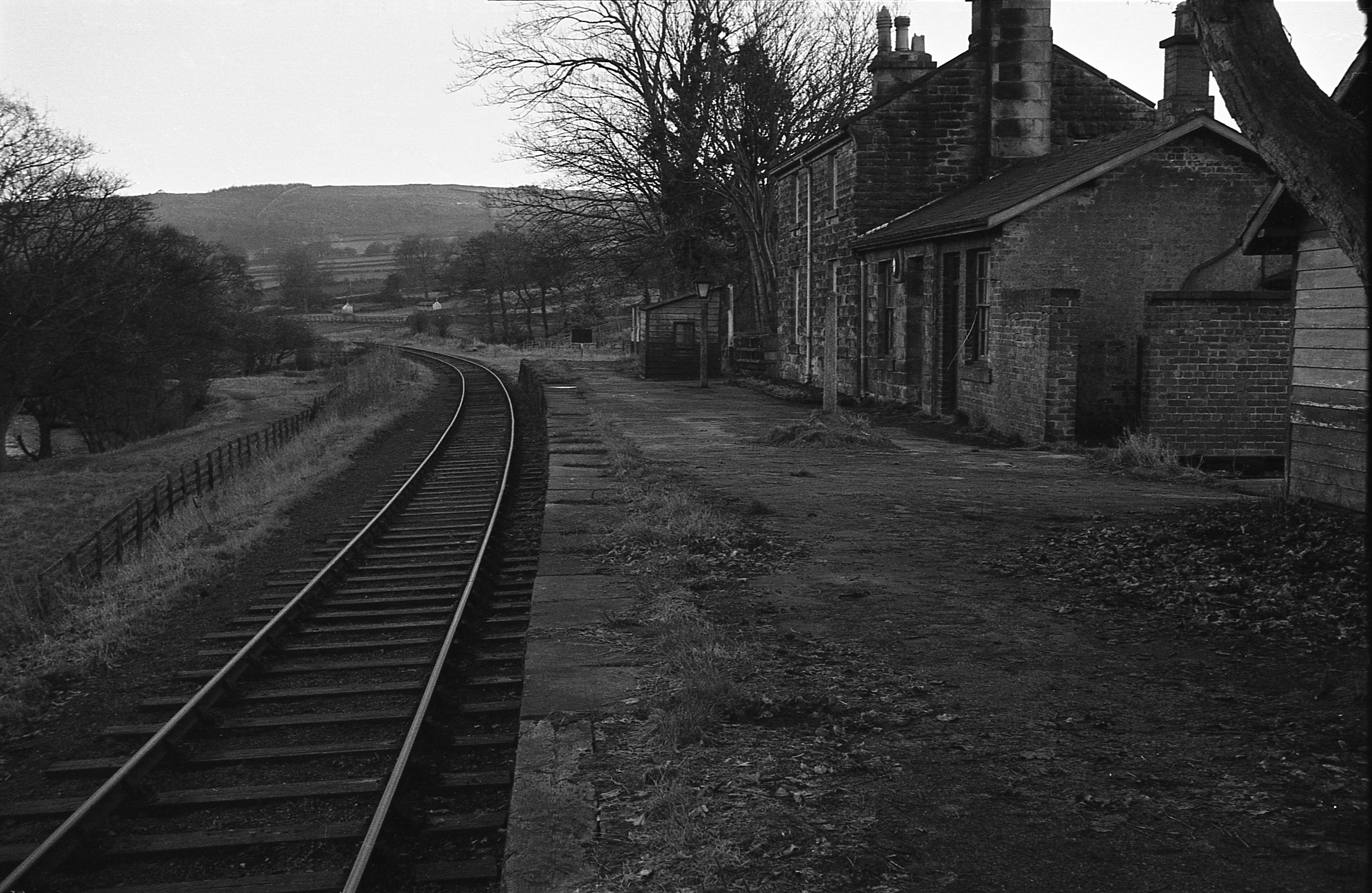
- Darley Station in about 1964

General information
- Location: Darley, North Yorkshire; England
- Coordinates: 54.0338°N 1.6873°W
- Grid reference: SE205598
- Platforms: 1

Other information
- Status: Disused

History
- Original company: North Eastern Railway
- Pre-grouping: North Eastern Railway
- Post-grouping: LNER

Key dates
- February 1864: Opened
- 2 April 1951: Closed to passengers
- 2 October 1953: Closed to goods traffic
Location

Darley railway station served the village of Darley, North Yorkshire, England from 1864 to 1951 on the Nidd Valley Railway.

== History ==
The station was opened in February 1864 by the North Eastern Railway. The residents of Darley had asked that a station be provided while the line was under construction in 1861, and the NER offered to contribute to the cost of a road from the village if the inhabitants could provide the land. The station was situated west of Birstwith and east of Dacre station. The last passenger train ran on 31 March 1951, with official closure on 2 April 1951. The line stayed open until 1964 although the station closed to goods traffic in 1953.

The station consisted of a single platform without a passing loop, a four-bedroom stone house for the station master and his family, with an adjoining booking office and waiting room. For some reason the design of the station was far simpler than the buildings designed by the NER Architect Thomas Prosser for Ripley, Birstwith, Dacre and Pateley Bridge. At a later date a separate ladies' waiting room and WC, and an outside gents' urinal and WC, were added at the Pateley Bridge end of the buildings. There were two small timber buildings on the platform: a lamp room, and a goods warehouse, essentially a lock-up shed. In the yard were two sidings, reached via a single connection from the main running line. A small three-sided timber shelter on the platform provided cover for the 6-lever signal frame, which operated the connection to the goods yard and the running signals. There was a 5-ton hand crane and a short timber loading stage, but no facilities for coal (unlike many NER stations). There was also a platelayers' hut and a wash house for the station master and family. At the exit from the yard there was a stone-built weigh house with a 12-ton weighing machine. At the Birstwith end of the yard was a pair of brick semi-detached cottages of a standard NER design.

Preceding station	Disused railways	Following station
Dacre; Line and station closed	Nidd Valley Railway	Birstwith; Line and station closed
