= Pateley Bridge railway station =

Disused railway station in North Yorkshire, England

Pateley Bridge
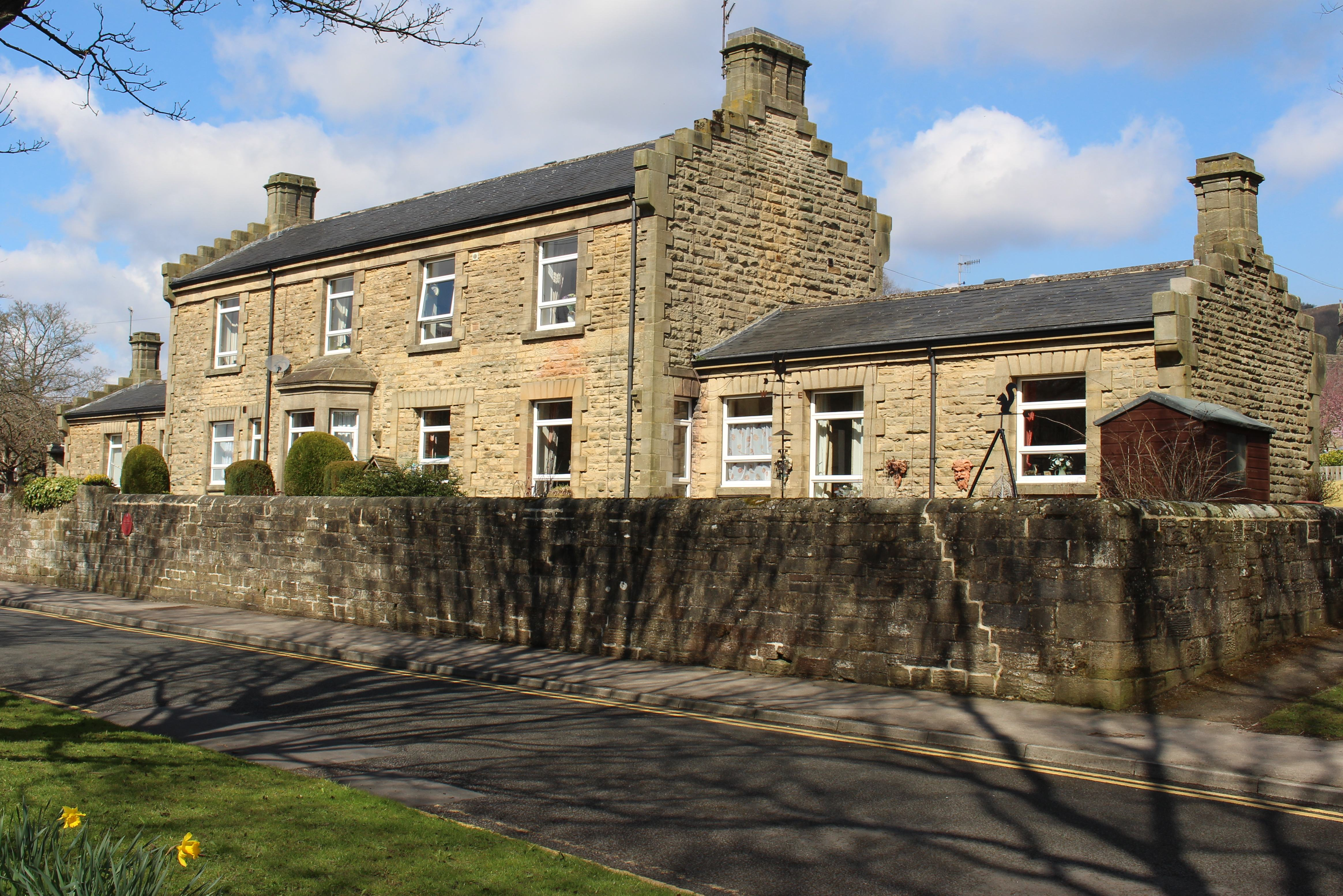
- The station buildings in 2015

General information
- Location: Pateley Bridge, North Yorkshire; England
- Coordinates: 54.0855°N 1.7596°W
- Grid reference: SE158655
- Platforms: 1

Other information
- Status: Disused

History
- Original company: North Eastern Railway
- Post-grouping: London and North Eastern Railway

Key dates
- 1 May 1862: Opened
- 2 April 1951: Closed to passenger traffic
- 31 October 1964: Closed to all traffic
Location

Pateley Bridge railway station is a disused railway station in North Yorkshire, England.

The station was the terminating station on the North Eastern Railway (NER) Nidd Valley branch line. The station opened in 1862 and had a single platform; a small goods yard and a small locomotive depot, comprising a shed and a railway turntable.

From opening a railway to Scotgate Ash Quarry linked to the station area. A 1000 foot rope worked incline was provided to move wagons to and from the quarry which had good quality building stone. A second quarry at Drayman Field was linked by rail to this line in 1890. The quarries fell out of use in the 1920s.

In 1907 a connection was opened from the station, across the main street in Pateley Bridge to link the Bradford Corporation owned Nidd Valley Light Railway (NVLR) with the NER branch line. This connection was only used by goods traffic as the NVLR opened its own passenger station a few hundred metres away and passengers had to walk between the two stations.

The station was host to a camping coach in 1933 and 1935, possibly one for some of 1934 and two coaches from 1936 to 1939, the station was also used as an overnight stop for touring camping coach service in 1935.

All traffic on the NVLR ceased in 1936 and the Nidd Valley branch went into a decline.

Following nationalisation the station became part of North Eastern Region of British Railways on 1 January 1948, but the ongoing decline led to the withdrawal of passenger services in 1951 and the closure of the line and the station to all traffic in 1964.

The main station building at Pateley Bridge survived and is now in private use.

Preceding station	Disused railways	Following station
Dacre; Line & station closed	North Eastern Railway; Nidd Valley Railway	Terminus
