= Birstwith railway station =

Disused railway station in North Yorkshire, England

Birstwith
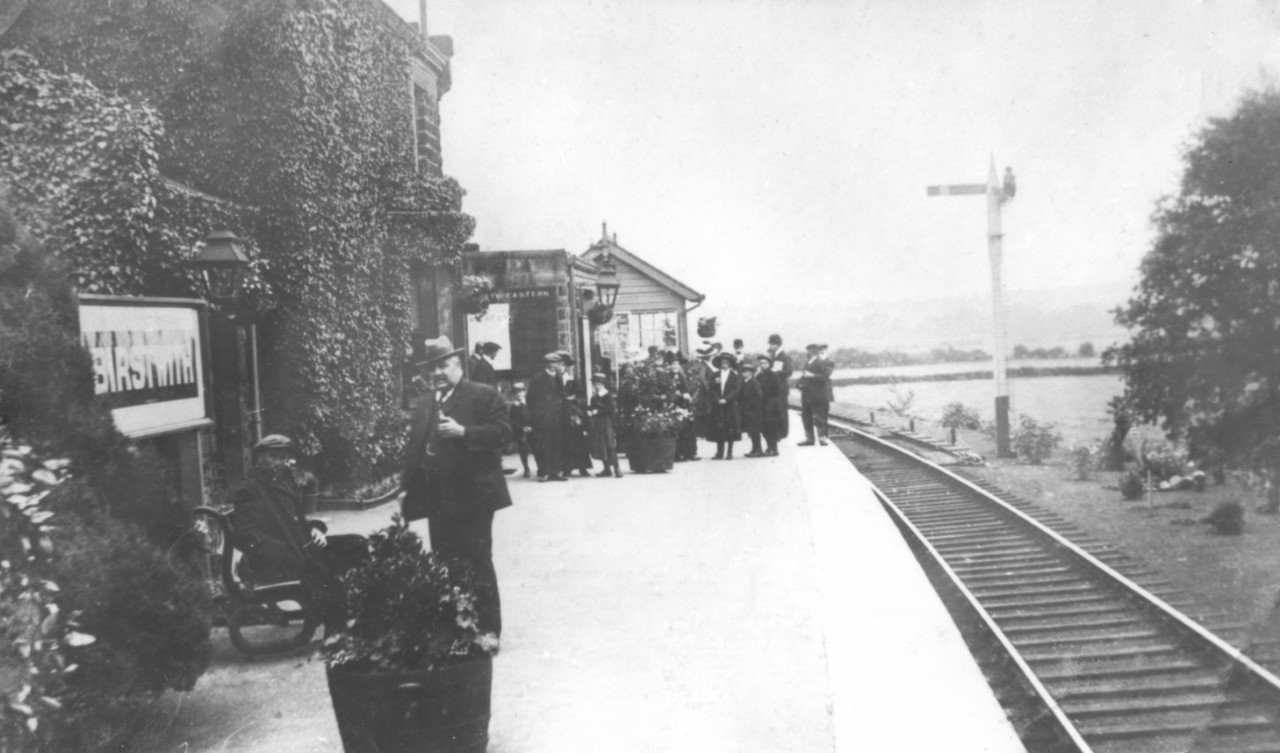
- Birstwith Station about 1911

General information
- Location: Birstwith, North Yorkshire; England
- Coordinates: 54.0337°N 1.6267°W
- Grid reference: SE245598
- Platforms: 1

Other information
- Status: Disused

History
- Original company: North Eastern Railway
- Pre-grouping: North Eastern Railway
- Post-grouping: London and North Eastern Railway

Key dates
- 1 May 1862: Opened
- 2 April 1951: Closed to passengers
- 31 October 1964: Closed to freight
Location

Birstwith railway station served the village of Birstwith, North Yorkshire, England from 1862 to 1964 on the Nidd Valley Railway.

== History ==
The station opened on 1 May 1862 by the North Eastern Railway. One of the two important intermediate stations on the Nidd Valley Branch, (the other being Dacre), it had a three-storey station building with the platform at first floor level, with access by steps from the yard. This was a stone building to the designs of NER Architect Thomas Prosser, and with its stepped gables it resembled those at Ripley, Dacre and Pateley Bridge. There was a large goods yard with 6 coal cells, a warehouse, a hand crane, a weigh office and five cottages (one building with two dwellings and one with three) for railway staff on the northern boundary. The signal and point levers were originally located on the platform but in April 1910 a new signal cabin was put into use at the Ripley end of the platform. Although there was a loop off the single line at Birstwith (and at Dacre), this could only be used by freight trains - in fact the timetable did not require passenger trains to cross at intermediate stations.

Birstwith handled large volumes of grain for Wreaks Mill (later Woods Flour Mill) although this had to be transported by road for the last few hundred yards as the mill was on the opposite side of the River Nidd. As a result the goods facilities remained open after withdrawal of the passenger service from 2 April 1951, finally closing on 31 October 1964. The site was cleared and redeveloped after closure; the only remaining traces are the cottages at the north side of the site (two stone buildings off Birstwith Grange, the name of the new road on the site), the western abutment of the bridge over the road leading to Clint, and the name of the Station Hotel opposite the former yard entrance (although the last-named was not a railway facility).

Preceding station	Disused railways	Following station
Darley; Line and station closed	Nidd Valley Railway	Hampsthwaite; Line and station closed
