= Thruscross =

Settlement and civil parish in North Yorkshire, England

Coordinates: 54.022°N 1.771°W

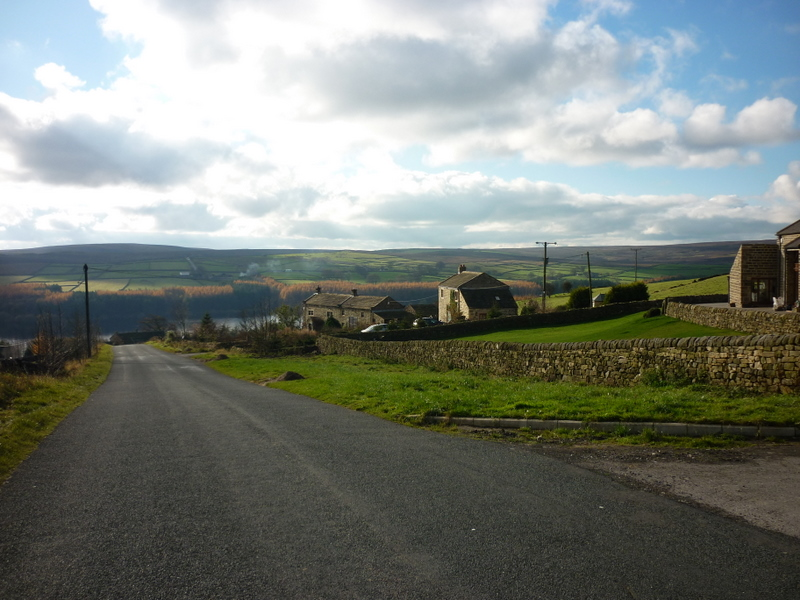
- Looking towards Thruscross Reservoir

- Location within North Yorkshire
- Population: 90
- OS grid reference: SE151585
- Civil parish: Thruscross
- Unitary authority: North Yorkshire
- Ceremonial county: North Yorkshire
- Region: Yorkshire and the Humber
- Country: England
- Sovereign state: United Kingdom
- Post town: HARROGATE
- Postcode district: HG3
- Police: North Yorkshire
- Fire: North Yorkshire
- Ambulance: Yorkshire
- UK Parliament: Skipton and Ripon

Thruscross is a small settlement and civil parish in the county of North Yorkshire, England. It lies in the Washburn Valley, 11 miles (18 km) west of Harrogate. The parish includes Thruscross Reservoir and a large area of moorland west of the reservoir.

Thruscross was historically a township in the ancient parish of Fewston. The township included the hamlets of Bramley Head, West End and Low Mill, and in the 19th century there were several flax mills in the township. It became a separate civil parish in 1866. The population of the parish is estimated at 90.

Until 1974 it was part of the West Riding of Yorkshire. From 1974 to 2023 it was part of the Borough of Harrogate, it is now administered by the unitary North Yorkshire Council.

Thruscross Reservoir was constructed in the 1960s, and flooded the hamlet of West End.

The name Thruscross derives from the Old Norse personal name Thori, and the Old English cros meaning 'cross'.

== See also ==
- Listed buildings in Thruscross
