= Dacre, North Yorkshire =

Village and civil parish in North Yorkshire, England

Coordinates: 54°02′36″N 1°42′27″W

Dacre
- Location within North Yorkshire
- Population: 764
- OS grid reference: SE192608
- Civil parish: Dacre
- Unitary authority: North Yorkshire
- Ceremonial county: North Yorkshire
- Region: Yorkshire and the Humber
- Country: England
- Sovereign state: United Kingdom
- Post town: HARROGATE
- Postcode district: HG3
- Police: North Yorkshire
- Fire: North Yorkshire
- Ambulance: Yorkshire

Dacre is a village and civil parish in the county of North Yorkshire, England, located 5 miles south of Pateley Bridge. In the 2001 census the parish had a population of 658, increasing to 764 at the 2011 Census. The village is situated on the crest of a hill overlooking the River Nidd. Infrastructure of the village includes the Providence Chapel and an old single-room schoolhouse which is currently used for community events.

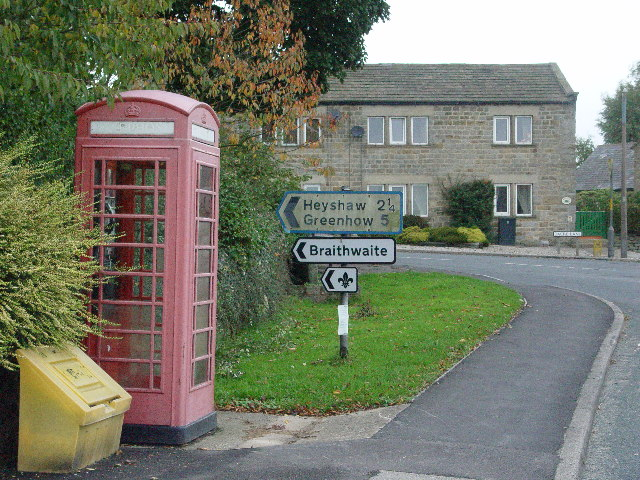
Dacre

The largest settlement in the parish is Dacre Banks, on the River Nidd, where Holy Trinity Church is located. The village of Dacre lies on higher ground a mile south of Dacre Banks.

Until 1974 it was part of the West Riding of Yorkshire. From 1974 to 2023 it was part of the Borough of Harrogate, it is now administered by the unitary North Yorkshire Council.

== Etymology ==
The name Dacre is of Brittonic origin and derived from the element *dagr, meaning "tears, weeping" and semantically "damp, moisture, wetness, trickling" (cf. Welsh dagr). It shares its etymology with the identically named Dacre in Cumbria.

== See also ==
- Listed buildings in Dacre, North Yorkshire
