= Nidd Valley Railway =

Disused railway line in Yorkshire, England

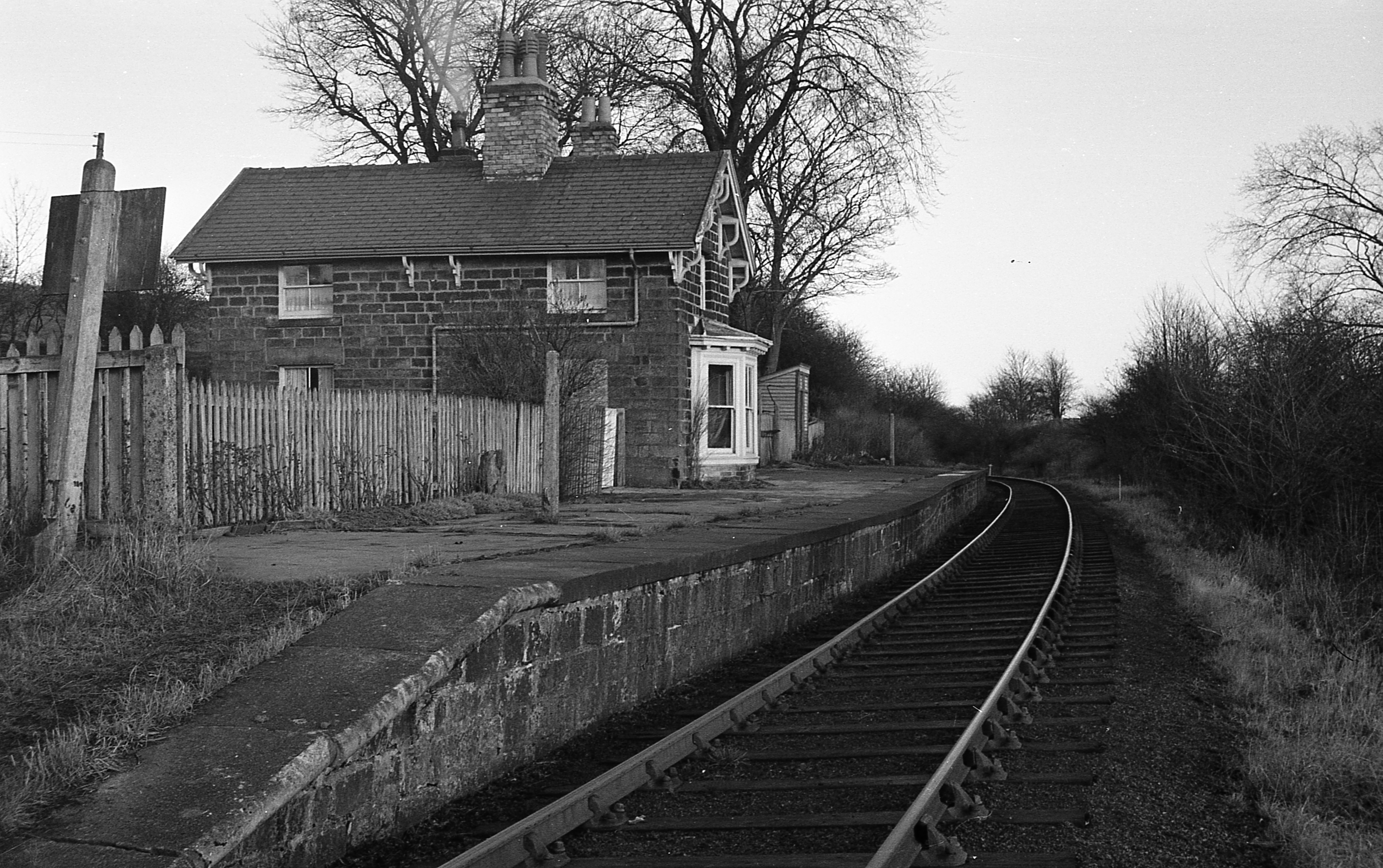
- Hampsthwaite railway station

Overview
- Status: Closed
- Stations: 6

Service
- Type: Heavy rail
- Operator(s): North Eastern Railway 1862–1923; London and North Eastern Railway 1923–1948; British Railways (N.E region) 1948 to closure

History
- Opened: 1 May 1862
- Closed: 30 October 1964

Technical
- Track length: 11 1/2 miles (18.5 km)
- Number of tracks: 1
- Track gauge: 4 ft 8 1/2 in (1,435 mm) standard gauge

The Nidd Valley Railway was a 11 1/2-mile (18.5 km) long single-track branch railway line that ran along the valley of the River Nidd in North Yorkshire, England. Built by the North Eastern Railway, it ran from Ripley Junction, on the Harrogate to Ripon Line, to Pateley Bridge via five intermediate stations, Ripley Valley, Hampsthwaite, Birstwith, Darley, and Dacre.

== History ==
The proposal to drive a railway into Nidderdale was first mooted by the Leeds and Thirsk Railway Company when they were constructing their line. Authority was granted in their act of Parliament, but they allowed the powers to lapse and in 1860, the North Eastern Railway, who had been granted authority in the North Eastern Railway (Pateley Bridge Branch) Act 1859 (22 & 23 Vict. c. x), started constructing the line instead. It opened to traffic on 1 May 1862. The branch was single line throughout, with no passing places for passenger traffic at the intermediate stations, though goods trains could pass at Ripley Valley, Birstwith and Dacre. The line ran a distance of 11 1/2 miles (18.5 km) from Ripley Junction on the Leeds to Thirsk line, which was 3 miles (4.8 km) north of Harrogate, the distance from Harrogate to Pateley Bridge being 14 miles 77 chains (24.1 km). The railway stayed on the north side of the River Nidd, (save a short stretch between Darley and Dacre stations) and was mostly uphill towards Pateley Bridge.

=== Stations ===
Upon opening the line had three intermediate stations: Killinghall (renamed first to Ripley in 1862, and then to Ripley Valley in 1875), Birstwith, and Dacre, with Darley opening in 1864 and Hampsthwaite opening in 1866.

Initially, services for passengers on the line amounted to four out and back workings per day between Harrogate and Pateley Bridge. By 1923, this was seven a day, but this tally fell back again when by the 1950s, only two services in each direction were working the line.

All stations on the line had goods facilities, with the exception of Hampsthwaite, which was for passengers only, and actually closed a year earlier to passengers than the other stations on the line (2 January 1950). Goods traffic was mixed; inbound was mostly coal and construction traffic (especially for transfer over to the Nidd Valley Light Railway) for the reservoir building schemes in Upper Nidderdale. Grain traffic to the flour mill at Birstwith continued up to closure of the line. Outward bound traffic was mixed too, with milk being common but the Scotgate Ash quarries above Pateley Bridge provided sandstone slabs and blocks that were used for the platforms at York, Newcastle, Holyhead and London Paddington.

=== Closure ===
After the traffic on the Nidd Valley Light Railway ceased, passenger numbers and through freight traffic on the branch declined. In addition, a bus service between Harrogate and Pateley Bridge with stops in the villages was more convenient for many residents than a walk to the station. The last scheduled passenger train ran on 31 March 1951 but the line remained open for goods until 30 October 1964. The last branch goods working was pulled by J27 0-6-0 No 65894.

The old line northwards from Harrogate to Ripley has been converted into a bridleway for walkers, horses and cyclists as Nidderdale Greenway. The entire line up to Pateley Bridge (and beyond on the Nidd Valley Light Railway), has also been proposed to be converted into a greenway.

== Nidd Valley Light Railway ==
Between 1907 and 1937 the line connected at Pateley Bridge to the Nidd Valley Light Railway, built to carry men and materials to the construction sites of two large reservoirs, Angram and Scar House.
