= Nidd Valley Light Railway =

Disused railway in Yorkshire, England

Coordinates: 54°10′50″N 1°56′22″W

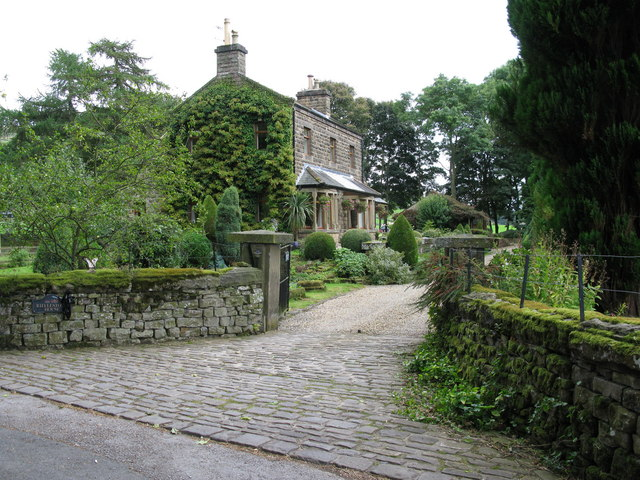
- The former station building at Wath

Overview
- Status: closed
- Locale: North Yorkshire
- Termini: Pateley Bridge; Lofthouse
- Stations: 4

Service
- Operator(s): Bradford Corporation

History
- Opened: 11 September 1907
- Closed: 31 December 1929

Technical
- Line length: 6.5 mi (10.5 km)
- Number of tracks: Single
- Track gauge: 4 ft 8 1/2 in (1,435 mm)
- Old gauge: 3 ft (914 mm)

Nidd Valley Light Railway was a light railway in upper Nidderdale in the West Riding of Yorkshire, England. It was owned by Bradford Corporation Waterworks Department and the corporation also operated its public passenger services. Power & Traction Ltd of London obtained a light railway order for the 6.5-mile (10.5 km) railway from Pateley Bridge to Lofthouse in 1900, but these powers were taken over by Bradford Corporation. A contract to build Angram Reservoir was awarded to John Best & Son in 1903, and he also won the contract to build the public railway and a 6.5-mile (10.5 km) private extension to the reservoir site. This was initially built to 3 ft (914 mm) gauge but was converted to standard gauge by 1907, when the public railway opened. Best had his own locomotives, and Bradford Corporation equipped the public railway with second hand locomotives and carriages from the Metropolitan Railway.

The Angram Reservoir project was completed in 1916. The corporation had obtained powers to build another reservoir at Scar House in 1913, and in 1920 decided to proceed, using direct labour rather than a contractor. The railway was upgraded, with the purchase of new and second hand locomotives, a railmotor for the public services, and second hand carriages for the workmen's trains. Curves on the line above Lofthouse were eased, and a short tunnel was built. At its height, the corporation were running fourteen locomotives, three steam navvies and 19 or 20 steam cranes. The work was essentially completed by 1931, but filling of the reservoir did not begin until 1935 and the official opening was the following year. With the work complete, the railway was lifted, and a sale was held at Pateley Bridge. Scar Village, which at its peak had housed 1,135 people, of whom 780 worked on the project, was reduced to eight occupied houses by 1936, with seven pupils at the school. The railway workers were not entitled to a pension, but pensions were awarded to four men who had served for many years.

== History ==
The origins for a railway in the upper Nidd Valley can be traced back to 1887–88, when Bradford Corporation began to investigate the valley as a source for the public water supply, following the discovery that Leeds Corporation had obtained rights to the waters of the River Burn, a tributary of the River Ure, above Masham. Alexander Binnie, who was the Waterworks Engineer for Bradford at the time, and Professor Alexander Henry Green, a geologist from Oxford, visited the area, and Green advised Binnie that the valley was suitable for the construction of large dams. The Bradford Corporation Waterworks Act 1890 (53 & 54 Vict. c. ccxxxi) was obtained on 14 August 1890, authorising the construction of four dams, but in the meantime, Binnie had moved on to work for London County Council as their Chief Engineer, and was replaced by James Watson of Dundee. A second act of Parliament, the Bradford Corporation Waterworks Act 1892 (55 & 56 Vict. c. cxxxii), was obtained on 27 June 1892, by which time the four reservoirs were Angram, Haden Carr, High Woodale and Gouthwaite. Gouthwaite Reservoir was designed as a compensation reservoir, to maintain flows in the Nidd further down the valley.

Haden Carr reservoir was completed in 1899, together with a 32-mile (51 km) pipeline (the Nidd Aqueduct) to deliver the water to Chellow Heights service reservoir on the outskirts of Bradford. The route included over 6 miles (9.7 km) of tunnels. Gouthwaite Reservoir was built concurrently by a different contractor, between 1893 and 1901. The corporation next turned their attention to Angram, but the level of activity in the valley had attracted outside interest, and Power & Traction Ltd of London applied for a light railway order to construct a line from the terminus of the Nidd Valley Railway at Pateley Bridge to Lofthouse. The board of Power & Traction included Thomas Greenwood of Greenwood and Batley, which made electric vehicles and equipment for electric tramways. Following a hearing at Harrogate on 9 October 1900, the Light Railway Commissioners awarded an order to Power & Traction for a 2 ft 6 in (762 mm) gauge railway. Bradford Corporation initially agreed to invest £2,000, by buying shares in the light railway, but following meetings between them, the newly formed Nidd Valley Light Railway Company, Power & Traction, and Henry Jackson the nominated contractor, the company decided not to proceed with the project, and Bradford withdrew their offer to buy shares.

In 1903, Bradford invited tenders for the construction of Angram Reservoir, and the project was awarded to John Best in October–November, at a contract price of £365,492. Meanwhile, the corporation had reached provisional agreement with the Nidd Valley Light Railway Company to purchase the powers awarded to them to build the light railway. There was some debate about the gauge of the railway. Bradford wanted to ask the Light Railway Commissioners for permission to increase it to 3 ft (914 mm), probably influenced by Best, who knew that there were supplies of suitable contractors stock available for such a railway. They also wanted to ensure that they bought enough land to allow a standard gauge railway to be constructed "at any future time." The North Eastern Railway, owners of the Nidd Valley Railway, argued that it should be standard gauge from the outset, since they were running excursions to Pateley Bridge twice a week, and these could continue over the Nidd Valley Light Railway. It would also remove the necessity of transshipping goods.

The Board of Trade were reticent about allowing a municipal authority, in this case Bradford, to build a railway which was located outside its area of jurisdiction, and was not connected to a railway which started within its area. However, on 30 December 1903, a transfer order was granted, with powers to borrow up to £30,000 to fund the project. In May 1904, the Board of Trade agreed to a change to standard gauge, and borrowing powers were increased to £66,000 in 1908, because of the extra costs of building the wider formation. The document was signed by Winston Churchill, the President of the Board of Trade. In addition to the main reservoir contract, John Best was awarded a contract to build the light railway to Lofthouse for £23,000, and a tramway from Lofthouse to Angram for £5,385.

=== Construction ===
Prior to Best starting on the main contract, Holme and King had been awarded a contract in April 1902 to build a road from Lofthouse to Angram. Bradford had purchased enough land to allow the light railway to be built beside the road, and although Best was awarded a contact for the railway in 1903, it appears that Holme and King built a 3 ft (914 mm) gauge contractor's railway beside part or all of the road. They had two locomotives on site, both 0-4-0 saddle tanks, one bought second hand some years earlier and moved to the site in spring 1902, after working on several other projects, and the second bought new for delivery to Pateley Bridge. By mid-1904, there was a 6.5-mile (10.5 km) line from Angram, which crossed the River Nidd on a 20-foot (6.1 m) bridge just before it reached Lofthouse. Best began extending the line towards Pateley Bridge, and by 13 July 1904, it had reached a level crossing at Sykes Bank, 0.5 miles (0.8 km) below Lofthouse, and work had commenced at several other sites. On that date, a party of 150 members of Bradford City Council, with invited guests, arrived by train at Pateley Bridge, and were transported to Gouthwaite Dam in carriages. Here there was a ceremony in which the Lord Major cut the first sod for the Nidd Valley Light Railway. The party then proceeded to Sykes Bank, where a train was waiting, which consisted of 15 wagons fitted with makeshift seats, and two locomotives, one of which was Holme and King's Xit and the other was Best's Angram. It took about an hour to reach Angram, where there were presentations, and Alderman Holdsworth cut the first sod for the dam. Refreshments were then served and the party returned to Lofthouse by train and to Pateley Bridge by carriage.

The 3 ft (914 mm) gauge line soon reached Pateley Bridge, and Angram became the 'route engine', working the main line, with another named Bunty shunting the sidings there. The standard gauge rails were laid from Lofthouse outwards in both directions, and when the first standard gauge locomotive arrived, it was towed along the road to Sykes Bank by a Foden steam lorry, its flanged wheels making a mess of the road surface. The main line and sidings became mixed gauge for a while, although the third rail was gradually removed from 1906. At the Angram Dam site, a village for the workers was built, and the railway terminated in several sidings, which included a locomotive shed. The sidings were at a similar level to the crest of the dam. A branch left the main line and descended to the valley floor, where there was a cement mixing plant and more sidings. This line included a winch-operated incline which descended on a gradient of 1 in 15 (6.7%). Another incline, of 3 ft (914 mm) gauge, ascended the far side of the valley, giving access to Nidd sluice and lodge. A third incline brought rock down to the main line from a quarry, some 2 miles (3.2 km) below the terminus.

At Pateley Bridge, the Nidd Valley Light Railway station was to the north west of the North Eastern Railway's Pateley Bridge railway station, close to the River Nidd. The two were connected by a single track which crossed a level crossing. There were a series of sidings immediately after the level crossing, with the station and more sidings beyond that. A carriage shed and a locomotive shed were located a little further along the valley of the Nidd. Best built two-storey stone buildings for the stations at Pateley Bridge, Wath, Ramsgill and Lofthouse. He built a signal box at Pateley Bridge, with the other stations having ground frames and simple signalling. Operation of the line was controlled by the Tyer's Electric Train Tablet system, and six machines were ordered at a cost of £360. Both intermediate stations had goods sidings on the eastern side of the main track, while Lofthouse had a passing loop and sidings to the west.

=== Operation ===
Best had a number of locomotives, both 3 ft (914 mm) gauge and standard gauge, which operated over the entire line from Pateley Bridge to Angram during the construction phase. For the opening of the Nidd Valley Light Railway proper, the 6.5 miles (10.5 km) from Pateley Bridge to Lofthouse, Bradford Corporation ordered six open wagons and two brake vans from Hurst Nelson of Motherwell. Locomotives and carriages were obtained second-hand from the Metropolitan Railway in London. These consisted of ten 4-wheeled coaches and two 4-4-0 Beyer Peacock side tank locomotives. All had become surplus to requirements, as electrification of the line had been completed in 1905. The locomotives were fitted with condensing equipment, for working in the tunnels under London, but the price of £1,350 for the pair included removal of this, and the fitting of cabs. All twelve vehicles arrived at Pateley Bridge, with one engine in steam, and were driven to the exchange sidings by Mr McCallum, who worked for Best & Sons. The locomotives were named Holdsworth and Milner after two Aldermen who had served Bradford Waterworks since 1898.

An inspection of the line was carried out by Colonel von Donop for the Board of Trade on 24 July 1907. Its condition was found to be suitable for passenger traffic, with just a few minor recommendations needing to be carried out. An official opening took place on 11 September, when a train consisting of three carriages and the Corporation saloon were hauled by Holdsworth from Pateley Bridge to Lofthouse, with stops at Wath and Gouthwaite reservoir. At Lofthouse the engine was replaced by one of Best's engines, and continued to Angram where luncheon was served in the village reading room. Invited guested included a number of men from the Midland Railway and the North Eastern Railway. The secretary of the Power & Traction Company was also invited, but it is not known whether he was there on the day.

The two locomotives were much too heavy to comply with the light railway order, which specified a maximum axle loading of 6.5 tons. They weighed 46.6 tons in working order, with 36.7 tons carried by the two driving axles. The corporation applied for an increase in the axle loading, specifying the weight as "over 42 tons". Milner, the newest of the two locomotives, dating from 1879, did not perform well, and was replaced by a Hudswell Clarke 0-6-0 side tank, also named Milner in May 1909. The original Milner was sold to the North Wales Granite Company at Conwy in 1914. Following discussions with the Board of Trade in 1906, the corporation and the North Eastern Railway (NER} had obtained permission for three passenger trains per week to pass over the goods yard and sidings at Pateley Bridge, so that excursions could continue up to Lofthouse between June and September only. Despite the agreement, when the first excursion was due to make the journey on 14 September 1907, the NER decided not to allow their stock to pass onto the Nidd Valley Light Railway, nor to allow the corporation engine and carriages to come to their station, and so the passengers had to walk between the two stations. In order to avoid confusion for parcels traffic, Lofthouse station became Lofthouse-in-Nidderdale on 12 December 1907, and Wath became Wath-in-Nidderdale in February 1908 for similar reasons.

=== Scar House ===
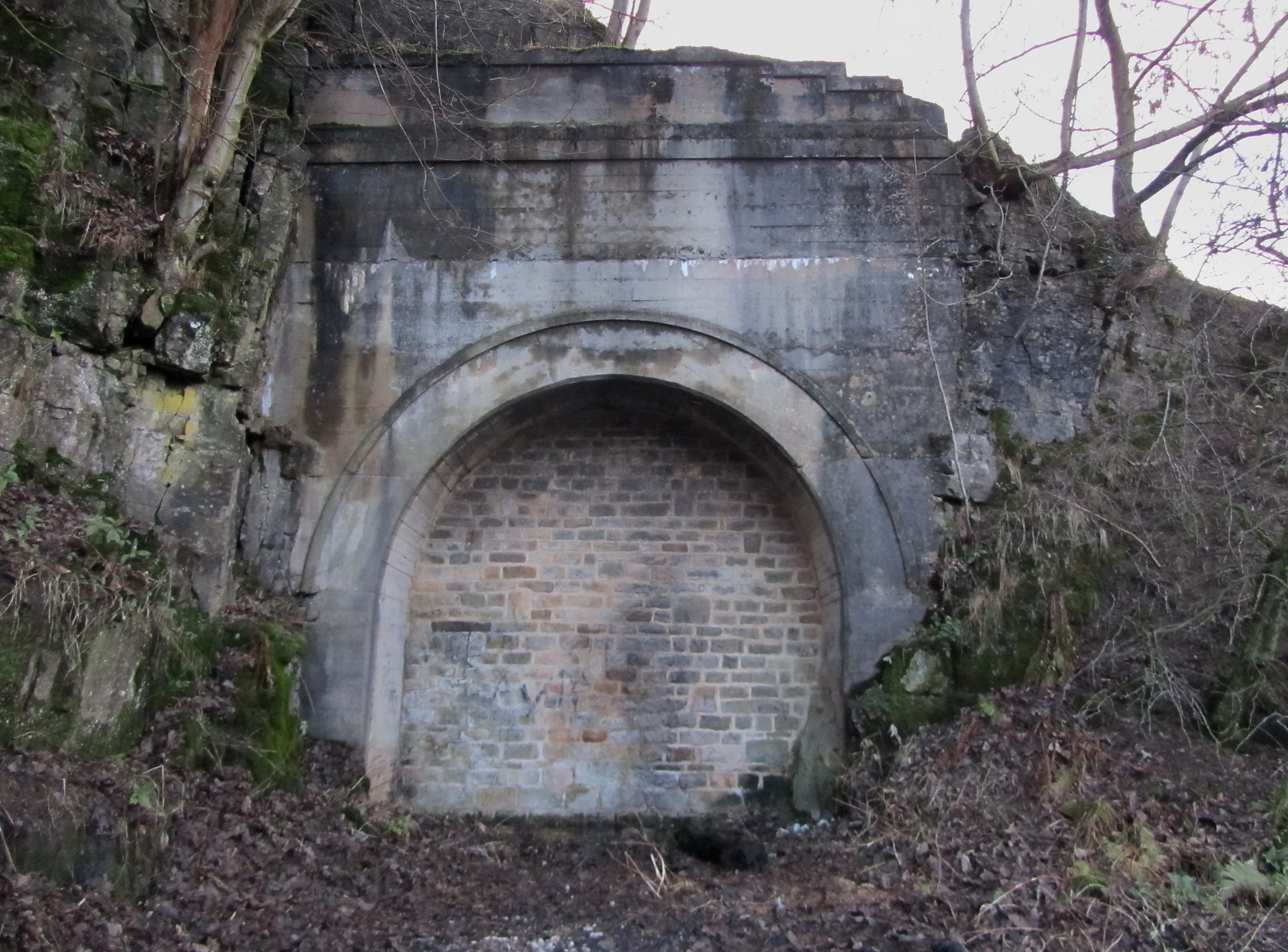
The southern portal of the tunnel near Goyden Pot

The work on Angram reservoir drew to a close in 1916. It had been allowed to fill in late 1915, and overflowed in January 1916. The school at Angram village was closed by June 1916, and the population was depleted. A certificate of completion was awarded to John Best & Sons on 4 August 1917. For a contract worth £365,493, and lasting fourteen years, it had overrun by just £7,267, which included the cost of some large granite rocks, located near the dam for decoration. Bradford Corporation had already obtained an act of Parliament, the Bradford Corporation Act 1913 (3 & 4 Geo. 5. c. xcvi), allowing them to abandon their plans for a reservoir at High Woodale, and instead to build a much larger one at Scar House. It would submerge the site of Haden Carr reservoir, and the act allowed them to start construction "when appropriate". The cost of the new works was estimated at £2,161,500, and although three tenders were received, they decided on 14 May 1920 to build it themselves, using direct labour. Scar village was built between 1920 and 1921, consisting of ten hostels for a total of 640 men, a school, canteen, recreation room, concert hall, mission church and some bungalows.

Plans to electrify the railway using hydro-electric power, were considered in March 1920, but rejected as being uneconomic. Holdsworth, dating from 1866, was thought to be too heavy for the line, but when no buyers could be found, it was used as a stationary steam supply for a further 14 years. There were plans to overhaul Milner, to obtain another lighter engine, and to purchase two railmotor cars. From August 1920, work was carried out to improve the line between Lofthouse and Angram. This included easing the alignment on many of the curves, the addition of loops near Lofthouse and at Woodale, just below the Scar House site, and the construction of a 180-yard (160 m) tunnel near Goyden Pot, which was used by up trains only. The line at Angram was extended to a small quarry in 1921, along the trackbed of Best's 3 ft (914 mm) gauge line beyond the dam. Stone was extracted for remedial work, caused by wind and wave erosion of the southern bank of the reservoir near the dam.

Near the Scar House dam site, a network of sidings were constructed, zig-zagging down to the Nidd, and back up the other side of the valley. A double track self-acting incline provided access to the Carle Fell Quarry, to the north of the reservoir, and as the quarry was worked, two further inclines were constructed. One was single track, with a winding engine at the top, and around 1930, an incline worked by locomotives was added. Above the later quarry face, a Simplex petrol locomotive worked on a 2 ft (610 mm) track, removing overburden. Hydro-electric power for the works was generated using water from Angram reservoir, which was discharged into Haden Carr reservoir. A 4,775-foot (1,455 m) pipeline supplied the turbines. This was later supplemented by a steam generating station. Two locomotive sheds were built, one near the village and another on the north side of the River Nidd, with a further two at Carle Fell Quarry. All had two tracks. Twelve four-wheeled carriages were bought from the Maryport and Carlisle Railway, to provide transport for the workers and their families from Scar House to Lofthouse, and a two-track carriage shed was built to the east of the main complex.

Six locomotives worked in the quarry. Allenby, Beatty, Haig and Trotter were based at the shed at the top of the main self-acting incline, while Ian Hamilton and Stringer were based in a shed at a higher level. Three steam navvies were used to load stone into the railway wagons, and there were nineteen or twenty steam cranes, all of which were self-propelled and ran on the tracks either in the quarry or on top of the dam. An official visit by officers of the corporation on 5 June 1925 used motor transport to reach Scar House, but the party then made the zig-zag railway journey to cross the valley and inspect the steam generating plant, which was on the far side. They ascended the incline to Carle Fell Quarry, sitting in wagons fitted with transverse seats, and having inspected the new workings, descended again, a scene which was officially recorded by a photographer.

The main engineering work was almost complete by the time of another official visit on 24 September 1931, but for whatever reason, filling of the reservoir did not start until 5 July 1935, when the main overflow valve was closed. The official opening was more than a year later, on 7 September 1936. Scar House, which gave its name to the reservoir, and which had been the home of Allan Best during the construction of Angram Reservoir, and of the resident engineer for this project, was demolished. A new Scar House was built, at the foot of the incline from Carle Fell Quarry, which provided a home for the reservoir keeper, and a boardroom for official visits. A project to re-route the waters from Armathwaite Gill and Howstean Beck through a tunnel and into the reservoir began in May 1929. A 2 ft (610 mm) gauge line was laid, on which two battery-electric locomotives and twelve wagons ran.

=== Decline ===
The start of work on Scar House Reservoir led to an overhaul of existing stock. Seven of the original Metropolitan Railway coaches were upholstered and repainted, while the remaining five were used for the workmen. A steam railmotor was obtained in 1921, which had previously been owned by the Great Western Railway. It was named Hill and was fitted with electric lights in 1923. It worked on the public section of the railway, and never travelled beyond Lofthouse. Numerous new and secondhand locomotives were purchased, most for use on construction work, but two, Blythe and Gadie, were fitted with vacuum brakes, and so worked goods trains from Pateley Bridge to Scar House, as well as passenger trains between Scar House and Lofthouse and sometimes Pateley Bridge. Passenger trains for the residents of Scar village ran on Tuesdays, Thursdays and Saturdays, the mid-week ones connecting with Hill at Lofthouse, and the Saturday ones running through to Pateley Bridge. The 1927 printed timetable showed five trains a day between Pateley Bridge and Lofthouse, but also showed the trains onwards to Scar Village, with a note that these were for exclusive use of residents. Saturday trains were hauled by Blythe or Gadie, but were banked at the rear by another engine above Lofthouse because of the steep gradients.

Traffic returns showed 106,216 journeys by workmen in 1921, and 41,051 by ordinary passengers. The figure for workmen was not declared after 1922, as the accommodation at Scar Village was available. The peak year for journeys was 1923, with 63,020, after which there was a gradual decline, with 24,906 journeys for the final nine months before closure. The line made a total operating loss of £36,435 between 1908 and 1924, and then made a modest profit until 1929. Fares were cut by one third in early 1929, in the face of competition from motor buses, and a decision was taken to close the line in April 1929. An approach to the London and North Eastern Railway to take over the railway was unsuccessful, and on 31 December 1929, the railway closed to public passenger and goods services. The sections below and above Lofthouse continued to be run as a private railway. The Saturday train to Pateley Bridge for the residents of Scar Village continued until 1932.

The construction of the main dam at Scar House finally severed the line to Angram in 1933. By 1936, with construction completed, the railway was lifted, and a sale was held at Pateley Bridge on 1 March 1937, where everything was sold as a single lot. The staff of the Nidd Valley Light Railway were laid off, and although their jobs did not qualify for a pension, pensions were paid to G. Pearson, who had worked for the company as a locomotive driver for 30 years, and to J. Brown, who had been a platelayer for 20 years. Pensions were also to be paid to another platelayer and the locomotive fireman on reaching the age of 65. At its peak, the Scar House reservoir project had employed about 780 men, and the population of Scar Village had been 1,135. By 1936, there were just eight houses occupied, and seven pupils at the school, which closed on 31 January 1938.

== Rolling stock ==
=== Locomotives ===
Most of the locomotives were saddle tanks, and there were four distinct groups. Holme & King Ltd owned two 3 ft (914 mm) gauge locomotives, which were used during the building of the road from Lofthouse to Angram. John Best and Son, the main contractor for the Angram Reservoir project, owned five 3 ft (914 mm) gauge and nine standard gauge locomotives, which were initially used on the whole line and then only above Lofthouse, while Bradford Corporation, as owners of the Nidd Valley Light Railway, had sixteen of their own standard gauge locomotives.

Holme & King Ltd 3 ft (914 mm)

- Xit, 0-4-0 saddle tank, Manning Wardle no. 475 of 1873. Arrived 1902 from Brighouse. Left after 1904 for Courtaulds factory at Coventry.
- Nidd, 0-4-0 saddle tank, W G Bagnall no. 1658 of 1902. Bought new. Sold after 1907 for work on Leighton Reservoir, Colsterdale.

John Best & Son 3 ft (914 mm)

- Eileen, 0-4-0 saddle tank, Andrew Barclay no. 297 of 1887. Arrived 1904 from an Irish contract, and left 1911 to work on Delph Reservoir, Bolton. Formerly named Tullibardine.
- Angram, 0-4-0 saddle tank, Hudswell Clarke no. 397 of 1892. Arrived by 1906 from an Irish contract, and left 1908 for Delph Reservoir. Formerly named Whittle Dean.
- Bunty, 0-4-0 wing tank, W G Bagnall no. 1480 of 1896. Arrived 1904 from an Irish contract. Sold by 1908 to Sir John Jackson Ltd for a project in Kinlochleven. Formerly named Crosshaven.
- The Nidd, 0-4-0 wing tank, W G Bagnall no. 1423 of 1893. Arrived by 1906 from Penicuik aqueduct project near Edinburgh. Sold by 1908 to Sir John Jackson Ltd for a project in Kinlochleven.
- Firefly, 0-4-0 saddle tank, Black Hawthorn no. 252 of 1873. Arrived 1910 from Butterknowle Colliery, West Auckland. Left 1913 to work on Delph Reservoir.

John Best & Son 4 ft 8 1/2 in (1,435 mm)

- No. 12 Midge, 0-4-0 saddle tank, Andrew Barclay no. 688 of 1891. Arrived after 1906 from Leith Docks project. Sold to a sand and gravel company.
- No. 13 (unnamed), 0-4-0 saddle tank, possibly Andrew Barclay no. 241 of 1882. Arrived 1906. Possibly sold at Pateley Bridge in 1920.
- No. 14 Glencoe, 0-4-0 saddle tank, Andrew Barclay no. 723 of 1892. Arrived 1906 from Ballachulish. Sold at end of contract.
- No. 15 Gameshope, 0-4-0 saddle tank, Andrew Barclay no. 820 of 1898. Arrived 1906 from Talla Waterworks, Edinburgh. It worked as the 'route engine' bringing materials up from Pateley Bridge to Angram. Left by 1914 for Edinburgh, and then sold.
- No. 17 Jim, 0-4-0 saddle tank, Andrew Barclay no. 754 of 1895. Arrived 1906 from Penicuik. At Vogrie Colliery, Fushiebridge by 1918.
- No. 18 John Best No 18, 0-4-0 saddle tank by Andrew Barclay. Arrived 1906. Disposal uncertain.
- No. 19 J.B., 0-4-4 side tank, Hudswell Clarke no. 612 or 1902. Arrived from Talla. Restricted to working between Scar House Quarry and Angram, as it did not negotiate the curves very well. Later sold to Armstrong Whitworth at Tyneside.
- No. 20 Warriston, 0-4-0 saddle tank, Black Hawthorn, other details uncertain. Arrived 1906. Used to supply steam to a pump in 1910/11. Disposal uncertain.
- Molly, 0-4-0 saddle tank, other details uncertain. Arrived some years after the contract started. Severely damaged when the boiler was lit up without water. Broken up on site.

Bradford Corporation 4 ft 8 1/2 in (1,435 mm)

- No. 1 Holdsworth, 4-4-0 side tank, Beyer Peacock no 707 of 1866. Ex-Metropolitan Railway A Class. Arrived 1905. Used as a steam source after 1921. For sale in 1934, and broken up soon afterwards.
- No. 2 Milner, 4-4-0 side tank, Beyer Peacock no 1878 of 1879. Ex-Metropolitan Railway B Class. Saw limited use, and its name was erased in 1909. Sold to North Wales Granite Company in 1914.
- Milner, 0-6-0 side tank, Hudswell Clarke no. 882 of 1909. Bought new to replace the previous Milner. It worked the main line, but after 1921, was based at Scar Village for use on passenger and goods trains. Sold 1934.
- Gadie, later Craven, 0-4-0 saddle tank, Hudswell Clarke no. 1411 of 1920. Bought new, and renamed Craven in 1925, when its nameplates were transferred to another locomotive. Moved to Laisterdyke Gas Works, run by Bradford Corporation Gas Department in 1930.
- Watson, 0-6-0 saddle tank, Hudswell Clarke no. 1197 of 1916. Arrived 1921 from the Gretna factory of the Ministry of Munitions. Sold 1934, and worked on the Ladybower Reservoir contract in Derbyshire. Watson was the chief engineer of the Waterworks Department from 1891 to 1919.
- Mitchell, later Illingworth, 0-6-0 saddle tank, Hudswell Clarke no. 1208 of 1916. Arrived 1921 from Gretna factory. Sold 1934, and worked on Ebbw Vale Steelworks construction. Mitchell was the corporation's engineer, who resigned in 1930. Councillor Illingworth was a member of the Waterworks committee. Although officially scrapped in 1957, it survived intact, and in 2014 was being restored for use on the Embsay and Bolton Abbey Steam Railway.
- Pioneer, later Haig, 0-6-0 saddle tank, Manning Wardle no. 1224 of 1891. Acquired 1921 by Bradford Corporation from Gretna factory, and may have worked at Chellow Heights briefly before transfer to the Nidd Valley. It was the first locomotive to work in Carle Fell Quarry. Sold 1934 and worked on the London Transport Ruislip extension.
- Ian Hamilton, 0-6-0 saddle tank, Hudswell Clarke no. 480 of 1897. Arrived from Gretna factory. It worked between the north concrete plant and the dam, and later on the top level of the quarry. Sold 1934.
- Allenby, 0-6-0 saddle tank, Manning Wardle no. 1379 of 1898. Arrived 1921 from Rosyth Dockyard. Worked in the quarry. Sold 1934, and subsequently worked at ROF Chorley in Lancashire.
- Beatty, 0-6-0 saddle tank, Manning Wardle no. 1669 of 1905. Arrived 1921 from Rosyth or Newport. Worked between the concrete plant and dam at Scar, then supplied steam to a pump in 1924, and later worked in the quarry. Sold 1934, and worked at Dunston-on-Tyne steelworks.
- Kitchener, 0-6-0 saddle tank, Peckett and Sons no. 939 of 1902. It worked between the quarry incline and the stone crusher. Sold 1934, and worked at Millom Iron Works, Cumberland.
- Blythe, 0-6-0 saddle tank, Avonside Engine Company no. 1894 of 1922. Bought new. It was based at Scar Village and worked goods trains to Pateley Bridge. It was fitted with vacuum braking and an electric generator, and also worked Saturday passenger trains to Pateley Bridge. Sold 1931 or 1932, and worked at Southampton New Docks.
- Gadie, 0-6-0 saddle tank, Andrew Barclay no. 1866 of 1925. Bought new. The nameplates were transferred from the previous Gadie on arrival. It was based at Scar Village and worked goods trains to Pateley Bridge. It was fitted with vacuum braking and an electric generator, and also worked Saturday passenger trains to Pateley Bridge. Sold 1934, and worked at Whifflet Foundry, Coatbridge. Lt. Colonel Anthony Gadie (later Sir Anthony) was a prominent person in the Waterworks Department from the 1890s until completion of Scar House Reservoir in 1936, and later chairman of the Waterworks Committee.
- Trotter, 0-4-0 saddle tank, Andrew Barclay 1810 of 1925. Bought new. Worked in the quarry. Sold 1931 or 1932. Alderman Trotter was a member of the Waterworks Committee from 1912.
- Stringer, 0-4-0 saddle tank, Andrew Barclay no. 1877 of 1925. Bought new. Worked in the quarry. Transferred to Laisterdyke Gas Works in 1931 or 1932.
- Hill, 0-4-0 steam railmotor, Kerr Stuart no. 906 of 1905. Ex-Great Western Railway, arrived 1921. Fitted with electric lighting, and worked the Pateley Bridge to Lofthouse public passenger service. For sale 1934, scrapped 1937.

=== Coaches ===
- Ten 4-wheel, ex-Metropolitan Railway, bought 1906 or 1907. Upgraded in 1921. Sold 1934.
- Twelve 4-wheel, ex-Maryport and Carlisle Railway, bought 1921 for workmen's trains. Sold 1934.

== Route ==
The railway began in Pateley Bridge, close to the River Nidd, with the goods yard just to the north of the B6265 road. The passenger station was a little further north, and is now occupied by a road called "The Sidings". It headed north along the east bank of the river, and this section of it now forms part of the Nidderdale Way, a long-distance footpath. Wath station was just to the south of the minor road that crosses Wath Bridge, and had two sidings. The footpath leaves the course of the railway before the station, and follows the bank of the river, crossing over the railway trackbed by Gouthwaite Dam. The trackbed was close to the shore of the reservoir, and the footpath rejoins it after a deviation to the north west. Ramsgill Station was at Bouthwaite, rather than Ramsgill, just to the south of Bouthwaite Bridge, where the Ramsgill to Bouthwaite road crosses Lul Beck.

The footpath rejoins the trackbed briefly at Low Sikes, where there was a level crossing over the Ramsgill to Lofthouse road. Lofthouse station was to the south of Lofthouse, sandwiched between the road and the River Nidd. The railway crossed the river on the bridge which is now the road bridge, (Note: Before the railway was built the road crossed the river by a ford.) and turned north, along a route which is now a metalled road owned by Yorkshire Water, but open to the public. The bricked up tunnel can be seen about 2 miles (3.2 km) from Lofthouse, where the road and river turn sharply west. There is a picnic spot near the southern portal of the tunnel. At Scar Village there is another picnic spot and a car park. The railway followed the most northerly of the two tracks at this point. Another track down to the weirs follows the course of one of the zig-zag tracks across the valley. A footpath crosses the dam to the north side of the lake, where the incline to the quarry is still clearly visible. Another road, open to the public on foot, follows the trackbed along the southern edge of Scar House Reservoir, to reach Angram dam. The course of the railway is clearly visible on the modern 1:25,000 Ordnance Survey map for almost the entire length of the railway.

== See also ==
- Nidd Valley Railway
