= List of crossings of the River Nidd =

== List of crossings of the River Nidd ==
Key to heritage status
Status	Criteria
I	Grade I listed. Bridge of exceptional interest, sometimes considered to be internationally important
II*	Grade II* listed. Particularly important bridge of more than special interest
II	Grade II listed. Bridge of national importance and special interest

Crossing	Date	Coordinates	Heritage status	Locality	Notes	Image
Angram Reservoir dam (private road)	1919	54.183°N 1.9349°W	-		Public footpath	Angram_dam_and_overflow_channel_-_geograph.org.uk_-_1303122
Scar House Reservoir dam	1936	54.1877°N 1.8988°W	-		Nidderdale Way	Scar House Dam
Woodale Bridge		54.189°N 1.8778°W	-	Private road to Low and Middle Woodale		
Newhouses Bridge		54.1863°N 1.8569°W	-	unclassified road to Newhouses, Newhouses Edge and Summerstone Estate		
Footbridge		54.1862°N 1.85°W	-		Public footpath	Footbridge across the River Nidd
Thrope Farm road (private)		54.1719°N 1.8465°W	-		Public footpath	Thrope Farm (geograph 8304804)
Lofthouse Footbridge		54.1579°N 1.8474°W	-		Public footpath	Bridge Over The Nidd
Unclassified road at Lofthouse		54.1564°N 1.8472°W	-			
West House Farm road (private)		54.1491°N 1.8325°W	-			Bridge over the River Nidd
Nidd Bridge, Ramsgill		54.1359°N 1.8202°W	-			Nidd Bridge, Ramsgill from Nidderdale Way
Gouthwaite Reservoir dam		54.1103°N 1.7854°W	-		No public access	Valve towers, Gouthwaite Dam
Wath Bridge	Early 19th Cent	54.1053°N 1.7803°W	II	Wath		Wath Bridge
Millennium Bridge (footbridge)		54.089°N 1.7651°W	-	Pateley Bridge		Newly constructed footbridge over River Nidd
Pateley Bridge	Late 18th Cent	54.0855°N 1.7611°W	II	Pateley Bridge	B6265	Pateley Bridge
Bewerley Hall Bridge		54.0777°N 1.7468°W	-			Weir on the Nidd
Glasshouses Bridge		54.0747°N 1.74°W	-	Glasshouses		Glass House Bridge
Footbridge at Harewell Hall		54.0724°N 1.7177°W	-		Public footpath	Footbridge, River Nidd
Summer Bridge	17th Cent	54.0563°N 1.6955°W	II	Summerbridge	B6451	Bridge at Summerbridge
White Oak Farm Bridge		54.033°N 1.6785°W	-		Public bridleway	Footbridge over the Nidd
Ross Bridge (Toll)		54.0384°N 1.6501°W	-	Birstwith		Ross Bridge
New Bridge	1822	54.0381°N 1.6415°W	II	Birstwith	packhorse bridge	New Bridge
Wreaks Bridge		54.0331°N 1.6286°W	-	Birstwith		
Hampsthwaite Bridge	1598	54.0277°N 1.6035°W	II	Hampsthwaite		Coffee coloured River Nidd
A61 Bridge		54.0322°N 1.5637°W	-	Killinghall	A61	Bridge over River Nidd
Killinghall Bridge	17th Cent	54.0323°N 1.5628°W	-	Killinghall		Killinghall Bridge
Nidd Viaduct	Mid 19th Cent	54.0202°N 1.5328°W	II	Nidderdale Greenway	North Eastern Railway	Nidd Viaduct
Burgess Bridge		54.0194°N 1.4994°W	-	Scotton		River Nidd, Burgess Bridge
Footbridge		54.0121°N 1.4792°W	-	Knaresborough		Bridge over the Nidd
High Bridge	1773	54.009°N 1.4749°W	II	Knaresborough	A59	Knaresborough_High_Bridge_-_geograph.org.uk_-_8225568
Knaresborough Viaduct	1851	54.0084°N 1.4715°W	II*	Knaresborough	Harrogate Line	Knaresborough Railway Viaduct
Low Bridge	1779	54.0032°N 1.4676°W	II	Knaresborough	B6163	Low Bridge, Knaresborough
Grimbald Bridge	Late 18th Cent	54.0004°N 1.4492°W	II	Knaresborough	B6164	
Arnold Kellett Bridge		54.0054°N 1.4352°W	-	Knaresborough	A658	
Goldsbrough Mill Bridge		53.9977°N 1.4403°W	-			Bridge at Goldsborough Mill
Ribston Lodge Bridge	1855	53.977°N 1.3996°W	II	Little Ribston		Ribston Park Bridge
Walshford Bridge		53.972°N 1.3737°W	-	Walshford	A168	
Motorway Bridge		53.9696°N 1.3693°W	-	Walshford	A1(M)	
Hunsingore Farm Bridge		53.9719°N 1.3467°W	-			Footbridge over the River Nidd
Cattal Bridge	1800	53.9802°N 1.3188°W	II	Cattal		Cattal Bridge
Skip Rail Bridge		53.9946°N 1.2620°W	-	Kirk Hammerton	Harrogate Line	
Skip Bridge	Late 18th Cent	53.9976°N 1.2656°W	II	Kirk Hammerton		Skip_Bridge_and_River_Nidd_-_geograph.org.uk_-_2097996
New Skip Bridge		53.9984°N 1.2654°W	-	Kirk Hammerton	A59	Bridge_over_the_River_Nidd_-_geograph.org.uk_-_199824
