= Nidderdale Caves =

Series of caves in North Yorkshire, England

Coordinates: 54.1805°N 1.8486°W

The Nidderdale Caves are a series of caves in Upper Nidderdale in North Yorkshire, England. There are two cave systems and most of the caves are in some way linked with one or the other. The smaller system is the Eglin cave system in the valley of How Stean Beck, a tributary of the River Nidd, associated with How Stean Gorge. The larger system is the Goyden cave system under the valley of the River Nidd, which flows east from Scar House Reservoir, then south, and shortly after disappears underground down several sinkholes to reappear at the rising just beyond the village of Lofthouse. Cavers can access several sections of this system via the different entrances.

The caves are a Site of Special Scientific Interest designated in 1987 under the name Upper Nidderdale.

== Entrances ==
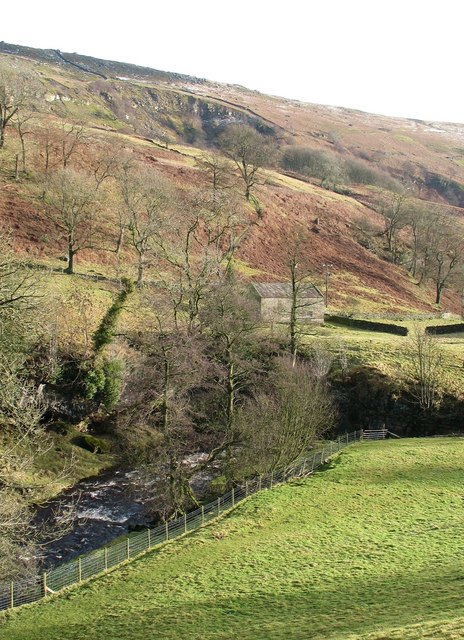
River Nidd about to disappear into Goyden Pot

From north to south:

1. **Manchester Hole** (NGR SE 100736 Length 578m)
2. Bax pot (alternative entrance to Manchester Hole Divers chamber, providing through the trip)
3. Lesser Stream pot (entrance into connecting passage Eternal Optimist, Linking Manchester Hole and Goyden pot)
4. **Goyden pot** (NGR SE 099761 Length 3.7 km)
5. Back Steps (alternative entrance to Goyden pot main chamber)
6. Church pot ( alternative entrance to Goyden pot Gaskell’s passage, flood exit route)
7. Limley pot (alternative entrance to Goyden pot, Mud Hall)
8. Zanussi pot (close to Limley pot now sealed closed)
9. **Guscott pot** (NGR SE 100757 Length 103m)
10. **Frog pot/Aquamole series** (NGR SE 101756 Length 640m)
11. Harrogate pot (close to Frog pot, now sealed closed)
12. Dry Wath entrance (original entrance to New Goyden pot now blocked)
13. Pigskin Pot
14. Old Quarry Pot
15. Vulcan rift pot (close to New Goyden main entrance bypassing first pitch, now blocked)
16. **New Goyden pot** (NGR SE 102754 Length 2.2 km)
17. Thrope Edge pot (alternative entrance to New Goyden pot South Avens)
18. Howgill pot (alternative entrance to New Goyden pot South Avens, now blocked)
19. **Nidd Head NW Rising** (NGR SE 104731 Length 850m)
20. **Nidd Head SE Rising** (NGR SE 105730 Length 250m)

Entrances in bold are classed as distinct caves in their own right and entrances not in bold are alternative entrances into those caves.

== Exploration ==
Explored passages total 8.3 km.

At present cavers and cave divers have explored and linked together the caves from Manchester Hole through to New Goyden Pot. The section from Goyden to New Goyden is only traversable with diving gear although cave diggers have opened up a way from New Goyden to Frog Pot and have attempted to find and open up a link from Frog Pot to Goyden Pot.

Cave divers have attempted to explore the link between New Goyden Pot and Nidd Head. At New Goyden Pot they have explored eight flooded passages (sumps) with various lengths of dry passages between. At the Nidd Head rising they have dived for over 850 metres with still about 1 km gap left to explore between the two caves.

== Hydrology of the Goyden System ==
=== Normal conditions ===
==== Manchester Hole to Goyden Pot ====
Water from the moors above Angram and Scar House drains into the reservoirs, which in turn feed the River Nidd. Below Scar House dam the Nidd flows east then turns south, and shortly after disappears underground through a series of small fissures in the exposed limestone inlier. All the water from the various fissures enters the large stream passage of Manchester Hole. The underground stream can be followed along an impressive 3 to 4 sq m passage to the equally impressive massive blockfall cavern of the Main Chamber. Faulting here is not only responsible for the blocks but has allowed incursions of more than one stream to aid the process of block fall. At present one small stream enters at the southern end, but previous flooding such as in 1998 has opened up choked passages, allowing a large volume of water to enter the Main Chamber. A huge section of the mud bank in that chamber collapsed and the flood subsiding refilled the passage. This process of opening and closing of inlets has probably been repeated many times over the centuries. The stream at the base of the chamber flows amongst fallen blocks to enter a passage of fine proportions, but the roof soon dips to where the stream enters a low area known as ‘the grovel’. The roof quickly rises again in Fossil Passage, where a narrow but high passage can be followed around more than one bend to a wider section. Here a small tube high up on the left leads to a permanently flooded section (static sump) 46m long that connects with Goyden Pot cave at Pillar Pot. The stream flowing through Manchester Hole does not connect with this static sump but instead flows onwards for a few metres to the ‘duck’. At the duck the stream makes a sharp right turn almost flowing back on itself through a hands and knees crawl with limited airspace. After a few metres of the ‘duck’ the passage once again enlarges and the stream then flows on for a few more metres to enter downstream sump 1. This sump is 15m long and enters Divers Chamber. The stream flows out of the chamber along a short passage to enter sump 2, a small constricted passage that enters the Lesser Stream area of Goyden Pot.

==== Goyden Pot to New Goyden Pot ====
In the Lesser Stream passage of Goyden Pot the many fractures in the rock allow the stream to diverge and flow in different directions. Sandstone boulders are washed in from the surface through the numerous inlets in this area. These inlets are also opened and closed through the action of flooding. The various streams quickly unite and flow amongst the large boulders that form the floor of yet another impressive large breakdown chamber, Goyden Main Chamber. The stream then flows out from under the boulders and over the cascades to flow along the huge Main Stream Passage, 25m high in places and typically 6m wide for more than 150m, to where it flows into sump 1, 20m long. The river flows out of sump 1 past October Passage, which steals a small amount of the river. It then flows along another huge gallery into sump 2, 6m long. From there the river flows along the largest of the stream passages in Goyden to sump 3, 27m long. Here the river flows into Bridge Hall, where a small inlet on the left enters, probably the water from October Passage but as yet unconfirmed. At the far side of Bridge Hall is sump 4, just 2m long, and then a short section of a passage to sump 5, about 57m long, and a lake airbell with a choked inlet in the roof. Sump 6, 12m long, leads from the airbell to a short passage with a roof passage leading into the Aquamole series that can be entered via Frog Pot. At the end of the short passage sump 7 is a low obstructed sump that connects with the upstream sump 2 and sump 1 of New Goyden Pot.

==== New Goyden Pot to the Nidd Head Resurgences ====
The water flowing from upstream sump 1 flows along a very fine round railway tunnel-sized passage to a bend, where a significant additional stream enters on the left. This is from Frog Pot and is the New Stream water from the New Stream sump in Goyden pot. The combined waters flow along the huge tunnel to a short flooded section, Middle Sump. At the far side of this sump the water flows for a short distance and then enters downstream sump 1. Divers have explored beyond sump 1 through another seven sumps. The water from this farthest point of exploration travels just over a kilometre to the furthest explored point of Nidd Head Resurgence. The Nidd actually resurges from three locations, the North West Rising, Main Rising and South East Rising. As the name suggests most of the water rises from the Main Rising and this has been explored by divers for over 850m. The North West Rising is presumed to flow from a point 119m into the Main Rising. The water from South East Rising has been explored for over 120m and is also thought to connect with the Main Rising.

The risings combine. The river shortly afterward is joined by How Stean Beck and flows down Nidderdale to Gouthwaite Reservoir.

=== Flood conditions ===
The Goyden system floods as a result of excess water overflowing the Scar House dam. This can happen not only following significant rainfall but also by wind action from a westerly or near-westerly direction. The wind on a full or nearly full reservoir whips up waves on Scar House Reservoir sending water over the dam that on occasion has pushed down the valley more than one metre depth of water from the reservoir. The caves can therefore flood in a period of no rain but by wind action alone. The water flowing down the valley is typically greater than the capacity of the fissures taking water into Manchester Hole. So most of the water flows past the Manchester Hole and onwards to Goyden Pot Main entrance. At various times old abandoned inlets are re-opened and re-closed by the flood waters allowing water to enter the far reaches of Manchester Hole and Lesser Stream passage of Goyden Pot. The increased flow into Manchester Hole and a pooling effect by the constricted sump 2, with possibly reopened inlets, causes the far end (between the ‘grovel’ and the ‘duck’) of Manchester Cave to flood, at times very quickly. Water flowing into Goyden Pot's Main entrance falls into the Main Chamber from high-level passages from the first and then the second and eventually the third window. This water joins the river flowing from Manchester Hole over the cascades and along the Main Stream passage. The swollen river flows through to sump 7 which due to its constricted nature causes the water to back up and flood the system from there all the way back. The rising water enters the roof passage between sump 6 and sump 7 taking with it much debris. The water flows along this passage into Toad Hall and through the 30m sump into Frog Pot, where it joins the New Stream water from Goyden Pot, New Stream sump. The combined flood waters flow into New Goyden Pot via Main Stream inlet to join the increased water from upstream sumps 1 and 2 in New Goyden. This water backing up through the system is first seen to rise in Frog Pot then Guscott Pot, Limley Pot, Church Pot and then Goyden Pot. By this time the far end of Manchester Hole has already flooded by the mechanism mentioned before. The whole system floods completely with the exception of Manchester Hole from the entrance to the ‘grovel’. The latter has been confirmed by leaving markers in the roof of Manchester Hole amongst the flood debris. The markers remained even in very high flood conditions in the rest of the system, which suggests that the flood debris present in the roof dates from before the construction of Scarhouse reservoir. Once Goyden is full water is forced past Goyden Pot Main entrance down the valley on the surface past the village of Lofthouse through to Gouthwaite Reservoir. In severe floods water mushrooms out of Church Pot, Limley Pot and New Goyden Pot, while Guscott Pot and Frog Pot still take water. In the most severe floods the River Nidd rises enough to lap into or small flow into Manchester Hole main entrance.

== Geology ==
The caves of Upper Nidderdale are extensive, and impressive and have unique characteristics within the UK.

- The cave system is largely developed beneath a major valley floor with many of the passages still beneath a cover of Millstone Grit or Upper Yoredale strata.
- It has developed across several geological structures including an anticline and several faults.
- In Manchester Hole vadose downcutting has breached the base of the limestone and cut into the underlying strata.
- Studies have confirmed that wind action on the Scar House Reservoir when full or nearly full can create significant overflow causing serious flooding of the caves further down the valley.

Nidderdale is at about the same altitude as Wharfedale and separated by just one ridge including the summit of Great Whernside. The Great Scar limestone so evident in Wharfedale is nowhere to be seen in Nidderdale as the easterly dip of the Pennine anticline carries it well below the floor of this small valley. The limestone visible in Nidderdale is the Yoredale series, and almost all the cave system have developed within the narrow band (maximum of 40m) of the Middle Limestone. The limestone outcrops in three inliers: one to the north including the cave sinks of Manchester Hole and Goyden pot, one small outcrop about 300m further south including New Goyden pot, and one nearly 2km further south including the Nidd Head resurgences. The most northern inlier of limestone is cut off from the limestone beds at Scar House Reservoir by a large fault. The most southerly inlier of limestone is cut off from any continuation by a fault just north of the head of Gouthwaite Reservoir. Each inlier is separated on the surface by the base of the Grassington Grit.

The cave system is contained within the Middle Limestone and chiefly developed along the shale partings of the bedding planes. The faults frequently mark the position of the sumps (permanently flooded sections of the cave), and between faults there are significant open passages. The cave drains water from north to south but the faulting in the middle inlier is responsible for water locally draining south to north under the normally dry river bed on the surface. This means that in flood conditions water on the surface drains north to south while the water in the large cave passage beneath drains briefly in the opposite direction before turning east and then back south.

Because the system is contained within a narrow band and chiefly covered by grit, it surprised early explorers that there were long sections of large passages such as Goyden’s and New Goyden’s mainstream. Goyden’s is typically about 6m wide and 25m high vadose canyon with small phreatic passage at the top. New Goyden’s passage is typically about an 8m diameter phreatic tunnel. What did not surprise early explorers was that the system was chiefly developed on one level. However further study and exploration have shown higher abandoned levels of development, on shale bands. These have been opened up by cave diggers and used to connect the caves of Nidderdale with dry connections after cave divers had explored the underwater links between the caves.

Distinctive fossil and chert beds so common a characteristic of the middle limestone are well exposed in the caves and provide some impressive examples. Fine examples of the chert bands are visible in Goyden Pot Main Stream Passage, the Turf and especially the Beet Route passage above High Rift. Chert bands are also visible in New Goyden Pot in the Main Stream passage, Main Inlet and Dry Wath series. Impressive examples of Productus giganteus fossils are present in the Fossil Passage area of Manchester Hole and on the surface by the intake fissures. Fossilised coral and many examples of crinoids are visible in quite a few of the caves but especially in Goyden Pot.

== Sources ==
- Northern Caves 1: Wharfedale & The North-East, Dalesman Books 1988, D. Brook, G. M. Davies, M. H. Long, P. F. Ryder; Nidderdale section, pages 147–163
- Northern Sump Index, Cave Diving Group, 1995, compiled by Paul Monico
- Limestones and Caves of North West England, edited by A. C. Waltham
- Descent: The Cavers magazine, Reports from Chris Fox in copies No.127 Dec/Jan 1995/96; No.138 October/November 1997; No.140 Feb/Mar 1998; No.141 April/May 1998; No.152 Feb/Mar 2000; No.156 Oct/Nov 2000; No.167 Aug/Sept 2002; No.172 June/July 2003; No.173 Aug/Sept 2003; No.178 June/July 2004; No.179 Aug/Sept 2004; No.181 Dec/Jan 2004/05; No.183 April/May 2005; No.186 Oct/Nov 2005; No.188 Feb/Mar 2006; No.190 June/July 2006; No.191 Aug/Sept 2006; No.192 Oct/Nov 200; No.193 Dec/Jan 2006/07; No.194 Feb/Mar 2007; No.195 Apr/May 2007; No.198 Oct/Nov 2007; No.200 Feb/Mar 2008; No.210 Oct/Nov 2009; No.214 June/July 2010; No.224 Feb/Mar 2012
- Cave and Karst Science, The Transactions of the British Cave Research Association, Volume 33 Number 1 2006 "An Introduction to the Speleo-history of Upper Nidderdale, Yorkshire, UK, to the early nineteen-sixties." Stephen A Craven
- Speleology. Bulletin of the British Cave Research Association, Issue 8, December 2006, "Caves of Upper Nidderdale:Development and Exploration", Chris Fox
