= How Stean Gorge =

Limestone gorge in North Yorkshire, England

Coordinates: 54°09′25″N 1°51′33″W

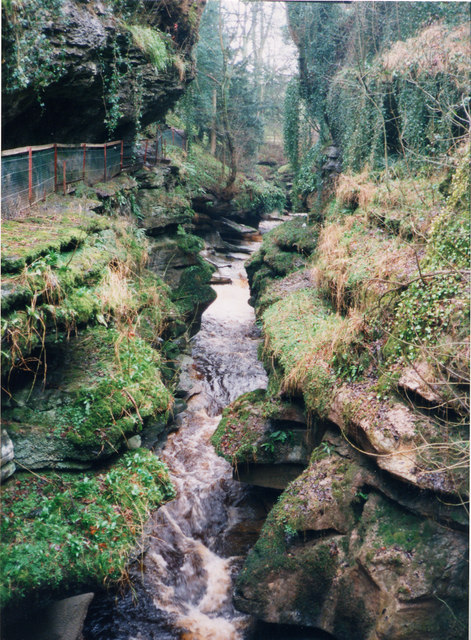

How Stean Gorge is a limestone gorge in Nidderdale in North Yorkshire, England. It forms a unit of the Upper Nidderdale Site of Special Scientific Interest. The gorge lies between the villages of Stean and Lofthouse and extends for about a kilometre along the course of How Stean Beck, a tributary of the River Nidd.

The limestone here is an inlier in the millstone grit, which prevails on the surface in Nidderdale. It is a subaerial gorge, some 15 to 20 metres deep, to which a series of vadose caves drain, a reversal of the usual pattern of underwater capture in a karst landscape.

One of the side caves, Tom Taylor's Cave, is said to be named after a local highwayman who sought refuge there. It leads from the north side of the gorge and emerges in a nearby field.

The gorge and Tom Taylor's Cave have been operated as a tourist attraction since the 19th century. The attraction now offers gorge walks and access to the cave, and also canyoning and a via ferrata.
