= Yorkshire Dales Rivers Trust =

British conservation charity

The Yorkshire Dales Rivers Trust was formed in 2004 with a remit to improve, restore and conserve the rivers Swale, Ure, Wharfe and Nidd whose headwaters lie within the Yorkshire Dales National Park and the Nidderdale Area of Outstanding Natural Beauty. The trust is a member of the Association of Rivers Trusts which set up as a charity in 2001 to represent member trusts and assist them with conserving river catchments across England and Wales.

== Remit ==
The trust's remit is to improve the catchments of the four rivers of interest from the headwaters to the Humber Estuary, starting with the upland sections of the rivers before moving work downstream. Many of the impacts on rivers arise close to the headwaters where annual rainfall is high and topography steep, resulting in rapid movements of water from land to river. This can be exacerbated by changes in land management including upland drainage channels on peat soils and soil compaction of in-bye land from heavy machinery and livestock.

There is some evidence to suggest that downstream flood events may become more regular and have higher peak flows due to such land management. However, the trust recognises that agricultural change has been driven by national and international economic drivers which have encouraged intensification, and that farmers are not at fault when it comes to river degradation. The trust works directly with the farming community to try to identify win-win situations that can both improve the condition of river ecology whilst reducing farming costs or saving time. A simple example of this is rerouting clean rain water from slurry stores. This can save irrigation and spreading costs, allowing farmers to utilise animal fertilisers more efficiently and so improve crop yields and reduce runoff to rivers and diffuse pollution. The Association of Rivers Trusts has assisted with this work through the PINPOINT project which, through funding from the Catchment Sensitive Farming Delivery Initiative, has provided training in delivering farm advice.

Measures such as gill planting (planting woodlands on gill or clough uplands) or blocking upland drainage channels have helped reduce impacts on rivers by slowing flow rates and decreasing sediment and nutrient loadings. The trust also works with farmers and uses modelling tools such as SCIMAP to identify the most risky locations of a river catchment in terms of diffuse pollution delivery. This helps targeting of resources and allows river restoration to occur in the most needed locations. Over the next few years work will continue on projects including Catchment Sensitive Farming Schemes and salmon restoration projects.
