= Nidderdale Way =

Long-distance footpath in North Yorkshire, England

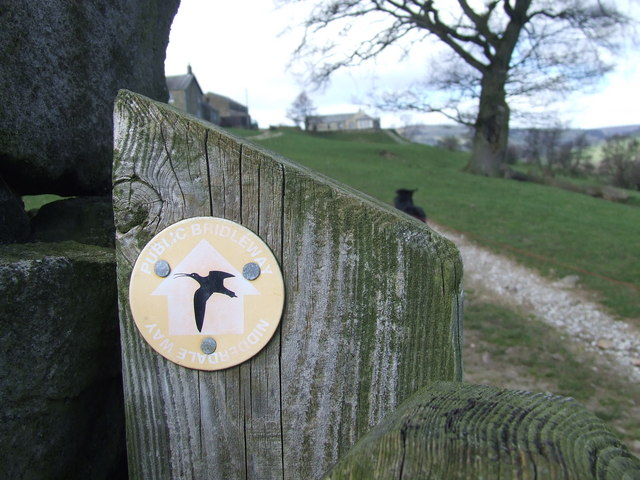
- Nidderdale Way Waymark
- Length: 55 miles (89 km)
- Trailheads: Ripley or Pateley Bridge
- Use: Hiking
- Elevation change: 1,220 feet (370 m)
- Highest point: 1,424 feet (434 m)
- Waymark: Curlew

The Nidderdale Way is a 55-mile (89 km) circular long distance footpath in Nidderdale in North Yorkshire, England.

The trail can be started and completed anywhere on the route, but the usual starting points are Ripley, linked by the frequent route 36 bus to Leeds, Harrogate and Ripon, and Pateley Bridge, the only town on the route.

The route follows the northern side of the dale on the outward leg and returns on the southern side. Consequently, the outward and return legs are never far apart.

From Ripley the path follows a series of side valleys on the northern side of Nidderdale and then climbs to Brimham Rocks. It then descends to the hamlet of Smelthouses and climbs to Blazefield before descending to Pateley Bridge. From Pateley the path keeps close to the River Nidd, passing Wath, Gouthwaite Reservoir and Bouthwaite to Lofthouse. The path then takes a route high above the Nidd to reach the dam of Scar House Reservoir, where it crosses to the right or south bank of the river. From the dam the path climbs an old track to reach its highest point at 1,424 feet (434 m), before descending to the village of Middlesmoor. It then crosses Stean Beck to reach Stean, and descends on the western side of the valley to Ramsgill.

From Ramsgill the route was changed in 2019 to avoid a section of road walking on the west side of Gouthwaite Reservoir. The Way now follows a minor road back to Bouthwaite and then returns by the outbound route on the east side of Gouthwaite Reservoir to Wath. It then recrosses the Nidd and ascends to Heathfield, and takes a long loop around the side valley of Ashfold Side Beck to reach Bewerley. The path then follows a high rocky section known as Guise Cliff, before descending to Dacre Banks. It then follows the Nidd downstream to Darley, Birstwith and Hampsthwaite, where it crosses the Nidd to reach Clint. Finally the path passes Ripley Castle to return to Ripley.
