= Nidd Aqueduct =

Freshwater aqueduct in North Yorkshire, England

Coordinates: 54°11′17″N 1°54′40″W

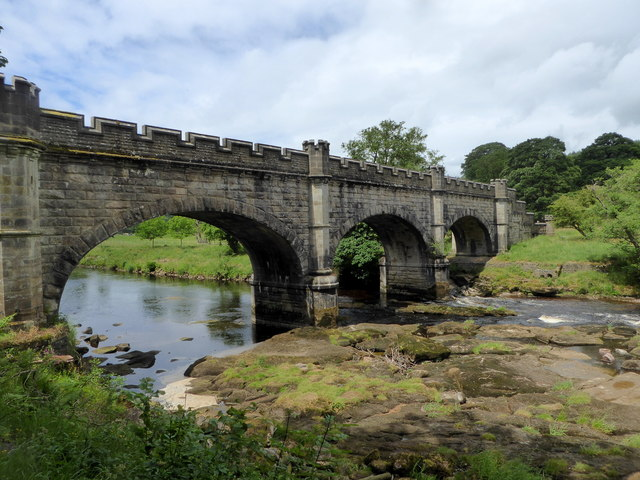
- Aqueduct carrying water from the Nidd Valley to Bradford over the River Wharfe near to Barden Bridge.
- Interactive map of Nidd Aqueduct

Specifications
- Length: 32 miles (51 km)
- Status: Open

History
- Original owner: Bradford Corporation Waterworks
- Principal engineer: Morrison & Mason Ltd
- Date completed: 1899

Geography
- Start point: Scar House Reservoir, North Yorkshire
- End point: Chellow Heights water treatment plant, West Yorkshire

The Nidd Aqueduct is an aqueduct or man-made watercourse in North Yorkshire, England. It feeds water from Angram and Scar House reservoirs in upper Nidderdale, North Yorkshire 32 mi (51 km) to Bradford in West Yorkshire. The aqueduct supplies 21,000,000 imp gal (95,000 m^{3}) of water per day to Chellow Heights water treatment works. The aqueduct and the reservoirs it connects to are all maintained by Yorkshire Water.

== History ==
The Bradford Corporation Waterworks Act 1892 (55 & 56 Vict. c. cxxxii) gave the City of Bradford powers to dam the River Nidd and its tributary Stone Beck in upper Nidderdale, and to build a conduit that delivered the water by gravity to Chellow Heights in Bradford. As Bradford has no major rivers running through it, the city needed fresh water for drinking and to be able to process wool (fulling). At that time, both Nidderdale and Bradford were in the West Riding of Yorkshire.

The first two reservoirs, Hayden Carr and Gouthwaite, were constructed in the early 1890s. Work started at Hayden Carr in 1894 by Morrison and Mason of Edinburgh. In 1893 John Best & Son started at Gouthwaite Reservoir further downstream, a compensation reservoir constructed so that the water supply to the lower Nidd valley would not be interrupted by work on the upper dams. In 1904 Bradford Corporation Waterworks initiated the building of the next reservoir in the scheme in upper Nidderdale. Angram reservoir was also constructed by John Best & Son, to a design by Bradford's city engineer, James Watson. The aqueduct was constructed by Morrison & Mason Ltd.

When Angram was nearing completion, Bradford Corporation decided to construct a larger dam at Scar House, which would incorporate and submerge the Hayden Carr reservoir. Scar House Reservoir was started in 1920 with direct labour under the control of James Watson's successor, Lewis Mitchell, and completed in 1936. The new reservoir required the construction of a new tunnel from Scar House to How Stean Beck, which was started in 1929 by the Hoare family.

== Route ==
The aqueduct starts downstream of Scar House Reservoir, after the screening chamber on the south bank, a short distance east of the dam, at Ordnance Survey grid reference SE 06820 76880. (The screening chamber is shown on OS 25,000 map but not on 50,000 map). The Aqueduct tunnels under Rain Stang hill for 2,486 yards (2,273 m) at a depth of 484 feet (148 m), and re-appears at Armathwaite Gill. There is then a short overground section across How Stean Beck before another tunnel, 1,408 yards (1,287 m) long, below Heathfield Moor. The aqueduct then tunnels below Greenhow Hill, 380 feet (120 m) below the summit, for 6,204 yards (5,673 m) before re-appearing at Skyreholme, near Appletreewick. It crosses the River Wharfe on the Barden Aqueduct Bridge, between Barden and Bolton Abbey, and then Barden Beck near Barden Beck Bridge. It then heads across open land again, crosses the A59 at Bolton Abbey Railway Station and runs adjacent to Chelker Reservoir above Addingham.

The aqueduct then descends into Airedale and crosses first the Leeds Liverpool Canal over Mauds Bridge in Bingley, then Bingley South Bog Site of Special Scientific Interest. It passes underneath the A650 dual carriageway and crosses the River Aire at Cottingley. It then goes up to Chellow Heights where the water is stored.

== Construction ==
The route of the aqueduct is mostly sub-surface, apart from some small sections that drain water into the aqueduct. It was constructed from 12 miles (19 km) of cut-and-cover, 15 mi (24 km) of steel and cast-iron pipes and 6 miles (10 km) of branch feeder pipes. The route is entirely fed by gravity and the use of syphons. These also pick water up from other becks and streams in Nidderdale that the aqueduct crosses. The aqueduct is over 6 feet (1.8 m) high inside and is lined with concrete.

The only evidence of the aqueduct is in the various crossing bridges and syphons where the route goes across other bodies of water. Most of the exposed sections of the aqueduct have crenellated walls and towers. The bridge over the River Wharfe at Barden Beck is now used by walkers on the Dales Way. A pump was installed at Barden on the River Wharfe that is capable of abstracting 5,000,000 imp gal (23,000 m^{3}) of water a day into the Nidd Aqueduct and bolster the supply to Bradford.

The section through Greenhow Hill was 3.5 mi (5.6 km) long and was completed in 1899. This was beneficial to the lead miners there as it would drain away excess water from their mineworkings.

Another pipe was added alongside the original in 1920. Ten years later, the original pipe was found to be 30 inches (760 mm) out of alignment where it runs underneath Bingley South Bog. The 1920 pipe is elevated above the bog on concrete supports, but the original pipe was laid 10 feet (3 m) down underneath the bog surface. The pressure from the bog was forcing the pipe out of alignment and was in danger of interrupting the water supply.
