= Little Whernside =

Peak in the Yorkshire Dales, England

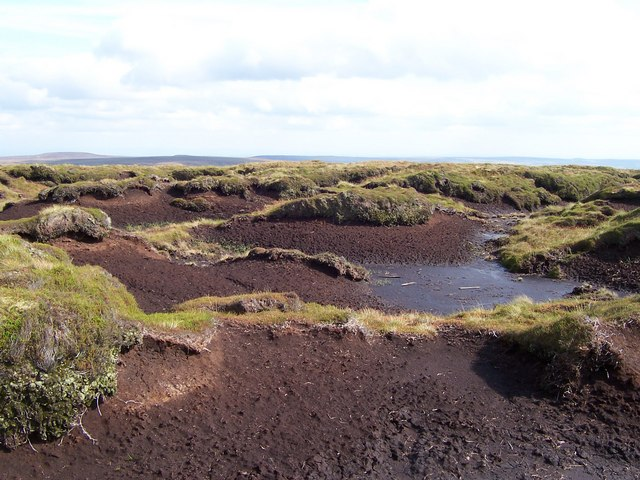
- The summit of Little Whernside

Highest point
- Elevation: 604 m (1,982 ft)
- Parent peak: Great Whernside
- Coordinates: 54°11′46″N 1°57′31″W

Geography
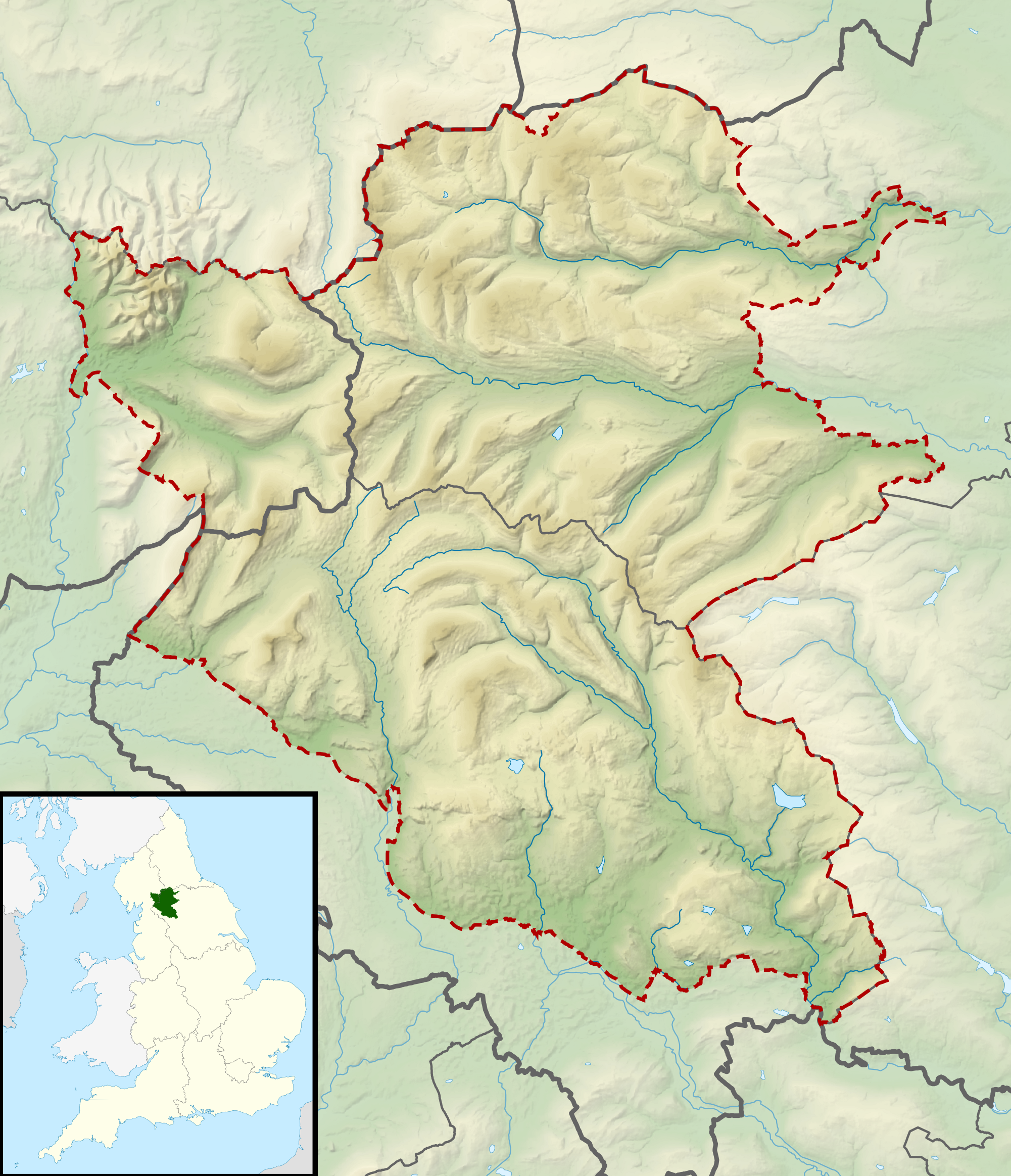
- Location within Yorkshire Dales
- Location: Yorkshire Dales, England
- OS grid: SE0280777646
- Topo map: OS Landranger 98

Little Whernside is a hill in the Yorkshire Dales, North Yorkshire, England, 2.82 miles (4.54 km) north east of Great Whernside. It is on the boundary between the Yorkshire Dales National Park and Nidderdale Area of Outstanding Natural Beauty, and forms part of the watershed between Coverdale and Nidderdale. The highest point is marked by a cairn, a few metres inside the National Park.

Little Whernside is on private land. Until 1997 no public right of way was established to the summit of Little Whernside, but in that year a public footpath was established along the ridge linking the summit to the summit of Great Whernside. Following the Countryside and Rights of Way Act 2000 the hill became open access land. Little Whernside can be ascended from Scar House Reservoir.
