= Chellow Dene =

Parkland in Bradford, West Yorkshire, England

- Chellow Dean
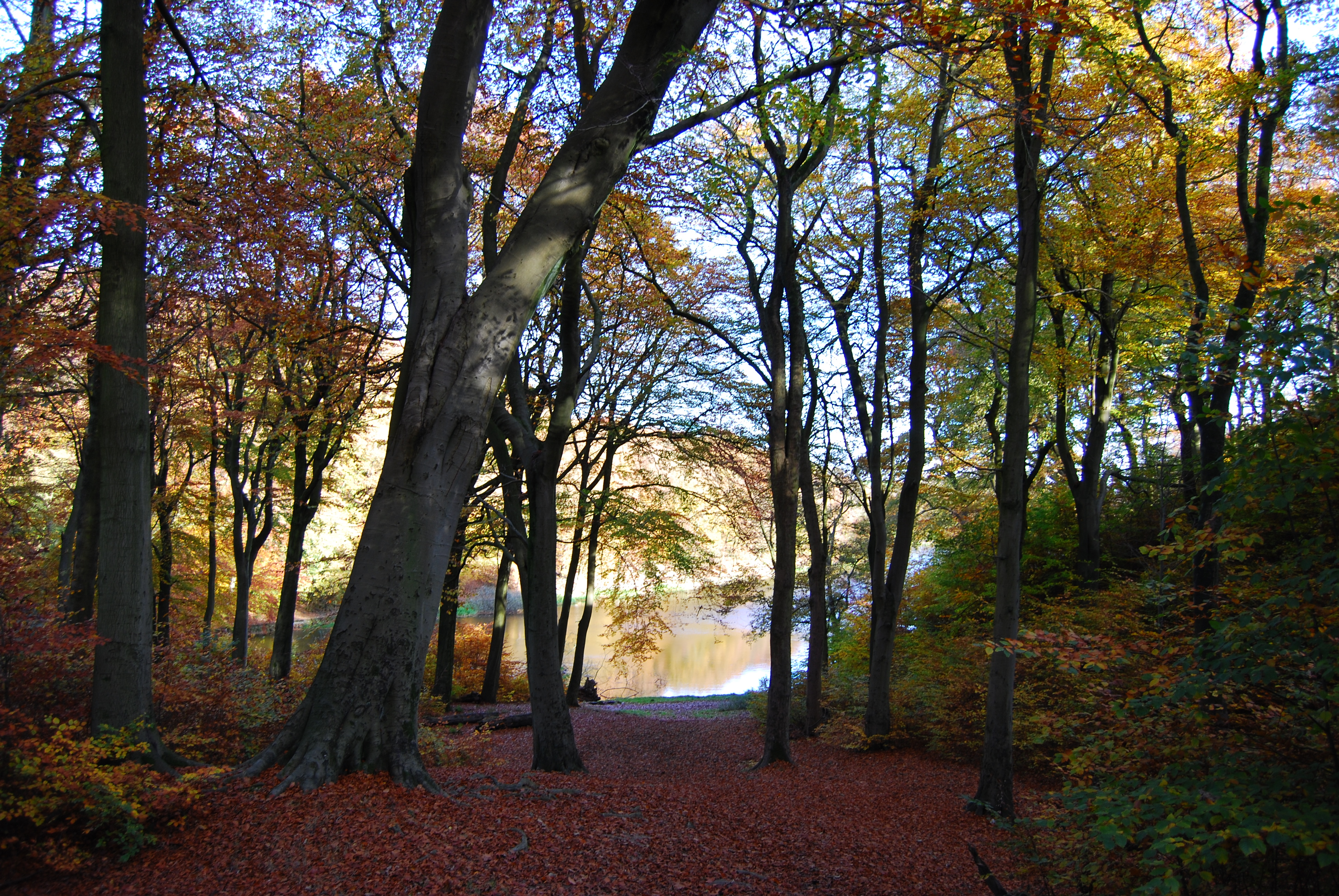
- Chellow Dean woods and upper reservoir
- Interactive map of Chellow Dene
- Location: Bradford, West Yorkshire, England
- OS grid: SE 116349
- Coordinates: 53.809°N 1.820°W
- Owner: Bradford Council
- Status: Open all year
- Public transit: Sandy Lane Crossroads

Chellow Dene (sometimes written as Chellow Dean), is a woodland and parkland in Bradford, West Yorkshire, England. Chellow exists in the Domesday Book and was its own settlement before becoming part of Heaton, then Bradford, with it now being in the City of Bradford. Chellow is now mostly known for the dene, and its associations with water and reservoirs, which are used to supply water to the City of Bradford. The open reservoirs are only used for water supply during times of drought, and are now owned by Bradford council, not Yorkshire Water.

== History ==
The name Chellow is mentioned in the Domesday Book as celeslau, and it derives from a person's name in Old English "Ceol", and means Ceol's hill (or) mound. At the time of the Domesday survey the area had eight ploughlands and belonged to Ilbert of Lacy. However, the influence of humans in the area pre-dates the Domesday survey as when the area for the waste treatment works was being excavated, pottery and bone were uncovered which date back to 1,500–1,000 BC (the mid–Bronze Age). The small valley that the reservoirs are located in, and through which Chellow Dene Beck flows, is thought to have been carved by a glacial meltwater with watering entering a large body of water to the east known as Bradford lake. The narrow valley is around 30–40 yards (27–37 m) across with shale and sandstone edges which rise to about 100 feet (30 m) above the valley floor.

Other subsequent area names include Chellow Heights (where the water treatment works are located), and Chellow Dean, the name of the valley in which the woods, reservoir and the beck are located in. Two spellings of Chellow Dean persist; Dean and Dene. William Cudworth spells the small vale both ways; in 1876, he lists it as Chellow Dene and twenty years later as Chellow Dean. The area of Chellow Dean (as opposed to just Chellow) is first mentioned around the time of Edward III (c. 1360), where it was described as being "..a certain common pasture for all the tenants of the lord of Bradefordale." (Note: Bradefordale is the old name for the area, before the various villages became the City of Bradford.)

Although today part of Allerton, Chellow, or Chellow Heights, was its own hamlet in the Township of Heaton, and the township of Heaton was incorporated within Bradford in 1882. the manor of Chellow Grange belonged to monastic order based at St German's in Selby. After the Dissolution of the monasteries, the grange and manor became the possession of various members of the Bolling family.

Flagstones were quarried in the area just to the north of Chellow Heights reservoir, and mining and smelting rights were granted around Chellow Grange in the 12th century. Whilst there is no evidence of slag at Chellow, any ore mined there could have been transported to Harden for smelting, which was a reasonable journey due to the presence of a Roman Road between the two settlements.

The local manor house was opened in 1720, and since 1928, it has been the clubhouse of the West Bradford Golf Club. The building has been grade II listed since 1983. There is a small car park off the B6144 road, near which is a bus stop served by the 619 service. The 615 and 616 services also pass very close by to the car park at Sandy Lane Crossroads.

Plans were revealed in early 2026 to develop the agricultural land south of the reservoirs into a 300-home estate.

== Chellow Heights ==
The waterworks at Chellow Heights were built so that water from the Nidd Aqueduct could then be supplied to most of the Bradford without the need for an expensive pumping station, as Chellow Heights is located at 842 feet (257 m) above sea level. The land at Chellow for use by the Bradford Corporation Waterworks was given to the company in 1895 by the Hodgson family, with the entire works costing around £11,000. Water from the reservoirs in the upper Nidd Valley takes approximately 18 hours to arrive at Chellow Heights, which is restricted to the amount of water it can abstract per day, (this was 113,000,000 cubic metres (4.0×10^{9} cu ft) per day in 2006). Two storage reservoirs were built, each with a capacity of 32,000,000 imperial gallons (150,000,000 L; 38,000,000 US gal), which were opened in 1900. Water to Chellow Heights now also comes from the River Wharfe at Chelker, and from Stubden and Thornton Moor reservoirs located on moorland south of Oxenhope.

When it first opened, water was piped to Whetley Hill Reservoir, and then to where it was needed around Bradford. In the 1960s, a water treatment plant opened at Chellow Heights covering an area of 44 acres (18 ha) which had a narrow-gauge railway used to transport sand, and used sand, around the complex. The site was renovated in the early 21st century to enhance the filtration tanks to enable them to remove manganese and other contaminants more easily than previously. Water pumped to the site contains the soft acidic flow from the River Nidd, and the hard, alkaline waters from the River Wharfe.

== Reservoirs ==
Building of the two reservoirs at Chellow Dean was started in 1841 with the upper reservoir (furthest west) being completed in 1844 and the lower reservoir in 1851. Water was piped from a source at Manywells Spring near Hewenden Reservoir at Cullingworth. The upper reservoir lies at a height of 211 metres (692 ft) above sea level, and contains around 115,080 cubic metres (4,064,000 cu ft) of water. The second reservoir, just to the east and 20 metres (66 ft) lower at 191 metres (627 ft) above sea level, holds around 70,550 cubic metres (2,491,000 cu ft) of water. In June 1913, a significant quantity of purple dye was found in the waters of the reservoirs, though not enough to create danger to human life. Suffragettes were stated to be behind the incident.

Water exits these reservoirs through Chellow Dene Beck, which in 2005, was converted into a wetland area to filter the water as it left towards Bradford Beck. The wetlands were renovated in 2024 as the filter beds had silted up, stopping the water from being cleaned properly and also acting as a suitable floodplain in times of high rainfall. Both reservoirs ceased to be used for drinking water in 1975 due to failing safety standards although an emergency order for abstraction was issued in 1995 during a drought in Yorkshire. The reservoir house, located between the two reservoirs, was grade II listed in 1983, as was the two-tier cast iron fountain located within the lower reservoir. The reservoirs are now owned by Bradford Council, not Yorkshire Water.

The reservoirs are the central attraction in the 12.57-hectare (31.1-acre) woodland. Wildlife noted at the site includes parakeets, all three types of native woodpecker to England, roach, perch, bream, carp, eels and pike in the waterways, and near the reservoirs is the only location in Yorkshire where the rustyback fern has been found. The upper of the two reservoirs is used as a recreational fishing lake.

== See also ==
- Listed buildings in Bradford (Toller Ward)
