= Scar House Reservoir =

Reservoir in North Yorkshire, England

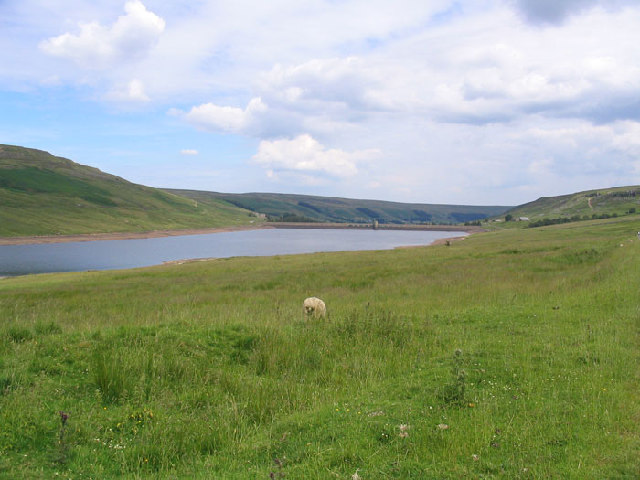
- Scar House Reservoir

- Location within North Yorkshire
- Location: North Yorkshire
- Coordinates: 54°11′17″N 1°54′40″W
- Type: reservoir
- Basin countries: United Kingdom
- Surface area: 70 ha (170 acres)
- Max. depth: 36.3 m (119 ft)
- Water volume: 10 million cubic metres (2,200×10^{6} imp gal; 8,100 acre⋅ft)

Scar House Reservoir is the second of the three reservoirs in Upper Nidderdale, North Yorkshire, England, the others are Angram Reservoir and Gouthwaite Reservoir. Between them they attract around 150,000 visitors a year.

Angram and Scar House were built to supply water to the Bradford area of West Yorkshire. Water from here is transferred to Chellow Heights via the Nidd Aqueduct using only gravity and no pumping.

The dam contains more than a million tonnes of masonry, it rises to 55 metres (180 ft) above the river and is almost 600 m (2,000 ft) long. It was completed in 1936. The dam height is 71 m (233 ft). The reservoir is fed almost exclusively from Angram Reservoir, which in turn is fed predominantly from the flanks of Great Whernside.

== History ==
Scar House was the last reservoir to be built in the Nidd Valley. It superseded an earlier reservoir, Hayden Carr, constructed in the early 1890s. Work started at Hayden Carr in 1894 by Morrison and Mason of Edinburgh. When Angram was nearing completion, Bradford Corporation decided to construct a larger dam at Scar House, which would incorporate and submerge the Hayden Carr reservoir. Scar House Reservoir was started in 1921 with direct labour under the control of Lewis Mitchell, Bradford's city engineer, and took 15 years to complete. Stone for the dam was quarried from the quarry on Carle Fell to the North and North West of the dam. An inclined railway was constructed to move stone from the quarry to the dam site.

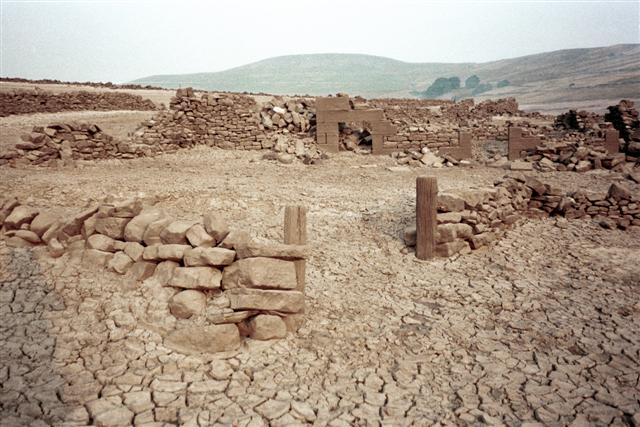
Ruined buildings revealed on the bed of the reservoir during the drought of August 1995

Scar House was once home to more than 1,250 villagers who lived and worked building the Nidderdale dam in the 1920s. Evidence of the village can be seen to the left of the reservoir approach road in the form of concrete bases and also just below the car park where one of the original buildings is now used by a local farm. After construction of the reservoir was complete, the old village hall was moved to Darley, where it is still a village hall.

The Nidd Valley Light Railway was constructed to enable the reservoirs at Scar House and Angram to be completed. The railway opened in 1907 and closed in 1937.

In 1932, the former church building at Scar House was moved to St Martin's Church in Heaton, Bradford.

== Facilities ==
- Car park
- Toilets
- Three picnic areas
- Wheelchair access
- Seasonal café (Saturday and Sunday only)

== Activities ==
- Fishing – controlled by the Nidderdale Angling Club
- Grouse shooting – controlled by Yorkshire Water and the Middlesmoor Estate.
- Walking
- Horse Riding
- Mountain biking
- Caving

The geographical halfway point of the Nidderdale Way is the dam at Scar House Reservoir.
