= Lofthouse, North Yorkshire =

Village in North Yorkshire, England

Coordinates: 54.1574°N 1.8430°W

Lofthouse
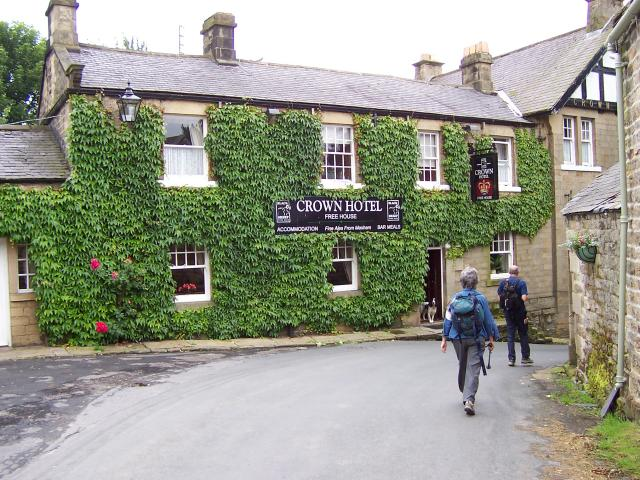
- Crown Hotel in Lofthouse in 2004

- Location within North Yorkshire
- Population: 197 (2011)
- OS grid reference: SE102735
- Civil parish: Fountains Earth
- Unitary authority: North Yorkshire
- Ceremonial county: North Yorkshire
- Region: Yorkshire and the Humber
- Country: England
- Sovereign state: United Kingdom
- Post town: HARROGATE
- Postcode district: HG3
- Dialling code: 01423
- Police: North Yorkshire
- Fire: North Yorkshire
- Ambulance: Yorkshire
- UK Parliament: Skipton and Ripon

Lofthouse is a small village in Nidderdale in the county of North Yorkshire, England about a mile south of Middlesmoor. It is the principal settlement in the civil parish of Fountains Earth.

Until 1974 it was part of the West Riding of Yorkshire. From 1974 to 2023 it was part of the Borough of Harrogate, it is now administered by the unitary North Yorkshire Council.

Lofthouse has a primary school, memorial village hall and public house, the Crown Hotel. The post office in the village closed in August 2014, and was replaced by a post office in the cafe at nearby How Stean Gorge, also now closed.

The toponym is from the Old Norse lopt hús, meaning "houses with lofts".

The Nidderdale Caves lie just north of the village. The River Nidd runs underground through the caves and emerges at Nidd Heads, just south of the village. The normally dry surface bed of the river passes the village to the west.

Between 1907 and 1929 Lofthouse had a railway station, the public passenger terminus of the Nidd Valley Light Railway. The station was named Lofthouse-in-Nidderdale railway station to avoid confusion with Lofthouse and Outwood railway station, also in the West Riding of Yorkshire.

== See also ==
- Listed buildings in Fountains Earth
