= Angram Reservoir =

Reservoir in North Yorkshire, England

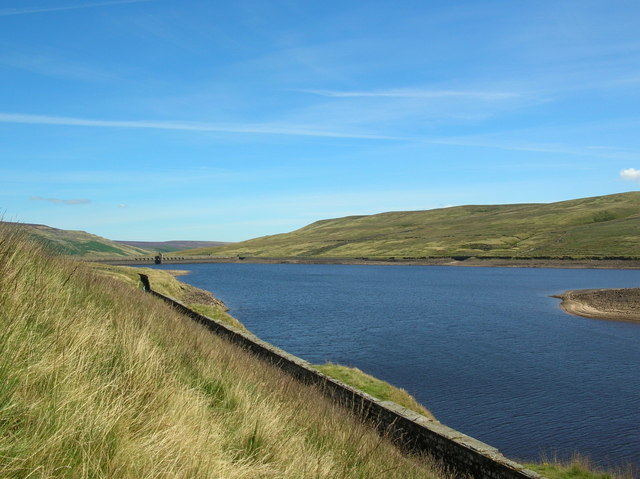
- Angram Reservoir, looking upstream

- Location within North Yorkshire
- Location: Upper Nidderdale, North Yorkshire
- Coordinates: 54°10′50″N 1°56′22″W
- Type: reservoir
- Primary inflows: River Nidd, Stone Beck
- Primary outflows: River Nidd
- Basin countries: United Kingdom
- Surface area: 34 ha (84 acres)
- Max. depth: 33.4 m (110 ft)
- Water volume: 4.75 million cubic metres (1,040×10^{6} imp gal)

Angram Reservoir is the first of three reservoirs on the River Nidd in Upper Nidderdale, North Yorkshire, England, the others being Scar House Reservoir and finally the compensation reservoir Gouthwaite Reservoir. It is located at OS map reference SE040759. Between them they attract around 150,000 visitors a year.

The reservoir takes its name from Angram, a settlement in the township of Stonebeck Up, submerged when the reservoir was completed in 1919.

Little Whernside (604 metres [1,982 ft]) to the north and Great Whernside (704 metres [2,310 ft]) to the west of the reservoir are close by.

The River Nidd flows for approximately 2 miles (3 km) from the flanks of Great Whernside before joining the reservoir.

== History ==
The reservoir was built to supply water to the Bradford area of West Yorkshire. It was built by Bradford Corporation between 1904 and 1919, under the Bradford Corporation Waterworks Act 1890 (53 & 54 Vict. c. ccxxxi) which also authorised the corporation to construct three other reservoirs in upper Nidderdale. Haden Carr reservoir was first built in the 1890s, just below Angram, and the works included the Nidd Aqueduct, by which water was transferred from Haden Carr to Chellow Heights via the Nidd Aqueduct using gravity only and no pumping. A small village was constructed at Angram site to house workers. The dam was faced with stone, which came from a quarry on the south side of the dale above Scar House, two miles down the dale.

Two bypass channels on each side of the reservoir were used to bypass the reservoir and maintain the level of the River Nidd. Once Scar House Reservoir was constructed, these become obsolete, but control machinery can still be seen on the Nidd and Stone beck inlets.

Completed	1919
Dam height	61 m / 200 ft

== Facilities ==
There is a shelter near the dam, but no other facilities. Near the dam of Scar House Reservoir, 1.2 miles (2 km) from the dam of Angram Reservoir, there is a car park, picnic areas and toilets.

There is a public footpath across the dam and around the reservoir. Fishing is not permitted at the reservoir.
