= Great Whernside =

Mountain in the Yorkshire Dales, England

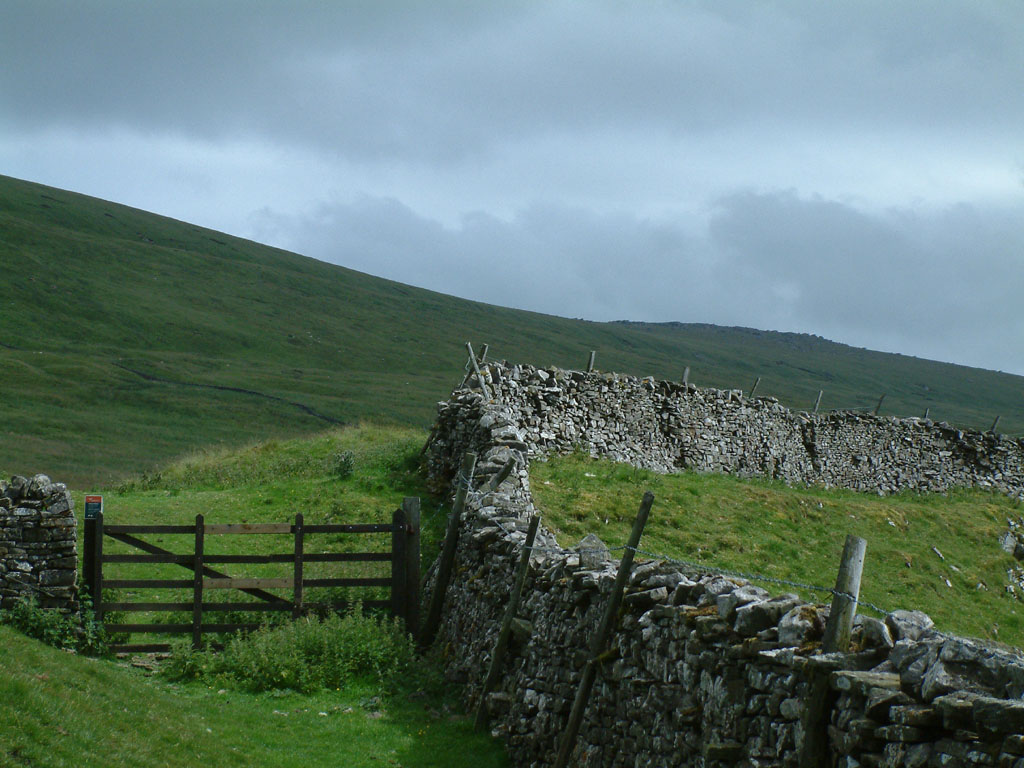
- Great Whernside from next to Tor Dyke near the road between Kettlewell and Coverdale

Highest point
- Elevation: 704 m (2,310 ft)
- Prominence: c. 288 m
- Parent peak: Whernside
- Listing: Marilyn, Hewitt, Nuttall
- Coordinates: 54°09′39″N 1°59′54″W

Geography
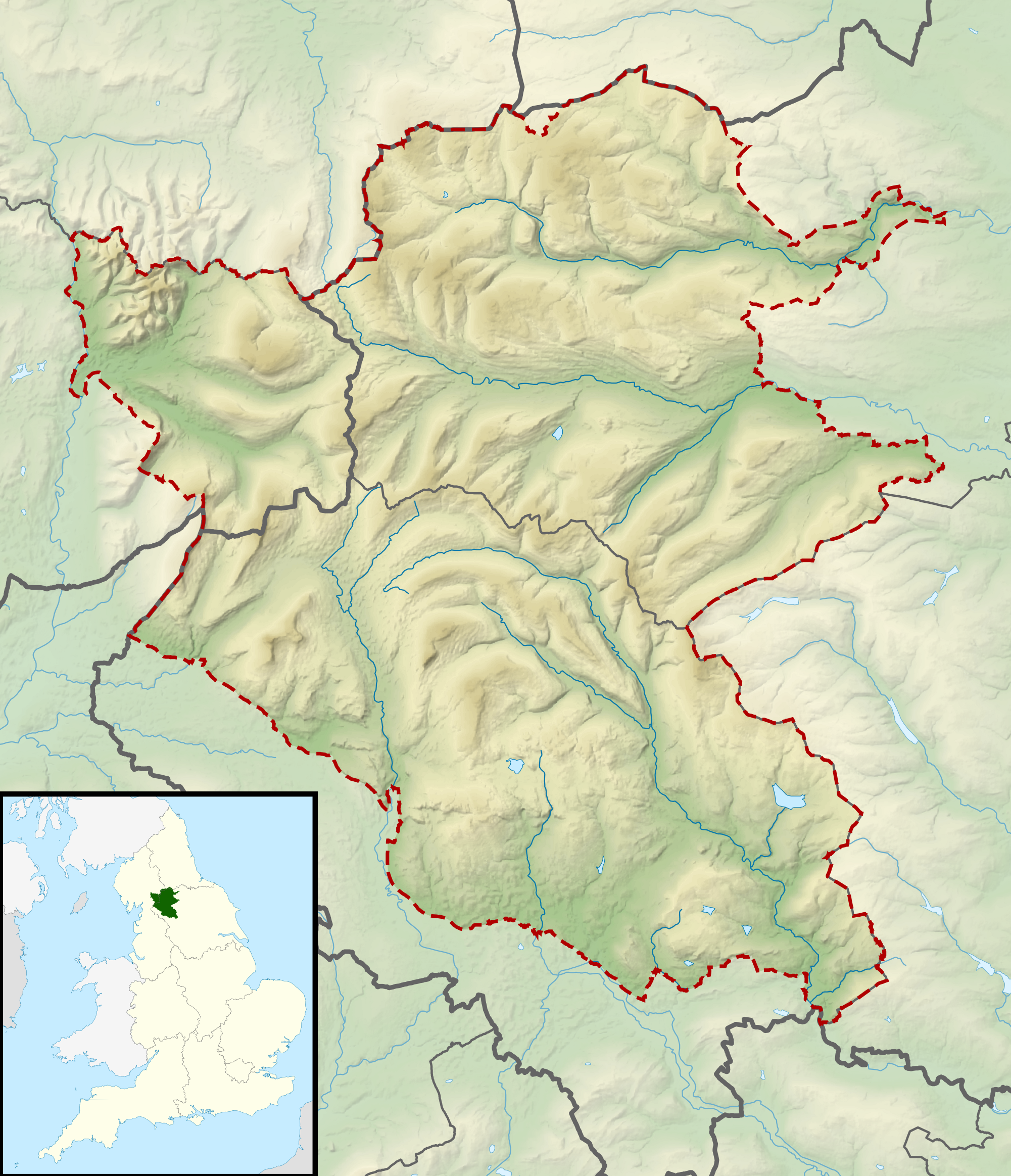
- Location within Yorkshire Dales
- Location: Yorkshire Dales, England
- OS grid: SE002739
- Topo map: OS Landranger 98

Great Whernside is a fell in the Yorkshire Dales, England, not to be confused with Whernside, some 17 miles (27 km) to the west. Its summit is the highest point of the eastern flank of Wharfedale above Kettlewell. Great Whernside forms the watershed between Wharfedale and Nidderdale, and is on the boundary between the Yorkshire Dales National Park and Nidderdale National Landscape. The River Nidd rises on the eastern slopes of Great Whernside, above Angram Reservoir.

== Name ==
The name Whernside, first recorded in 1214 as Querneside, is of Old English origin. It is derived from cweorn 'quern' or 'millstone' and sīde 'hillside', so means "hillside where millstones are found". The upper part of the hill is composed of millstone grit, and there were once quarries on the Wharfedale side. According to one source the name was originally applied to the hillside on the Wharfedale side, and then extended to the whole hill as seen from Wharfedale. The hill as seen from Nidderdale was known as Blackfell. The addition of Great was first recorded in 1771, apparently to distinguish the hill from Little Whernside.

== Access ==
Until 1997 no public right of way was established to the summit of Great Whernside. In that year two public footpaths were registered, one from Kettlewell in Wharfedale to the summit and one along the summit ridge. Following the Countryside and Rights of Way Act 2000 large parts of the fell became open access land. Great Whernside can be ascended from Kettlewell, or by a shorter route above Park Rash on the minor road from Kettlewell to Coverdale. It can also be ascended by a longer, less popular, route from Scar House Reservoir. Routes from the East are often boggy even after prolonged dry weather.

== Surroundings ==
Little Whernside, 2.5 miles (4.0 km) northeast of Great Whernside, forms the watershed between Coverdale and Nidderdale.

The fell has been the site of several aircraft crashes.

Hag Dyke, halfway between Kettlewell and the summit, is a hostel run by 1st Ben Rhydding Scout and Guide Group based in Ilkley.

Tor Dike, situated on the fell's north western flank, is an earthwork with ditch and rampart constructed in the limestone. It appears to have been built either by Iron Age tribes, perhaps in the 1st century AD, to protect themselves from the invading Romans, or in the Dark Ages.
