= River Nidd =

River in North Yorkshire, England

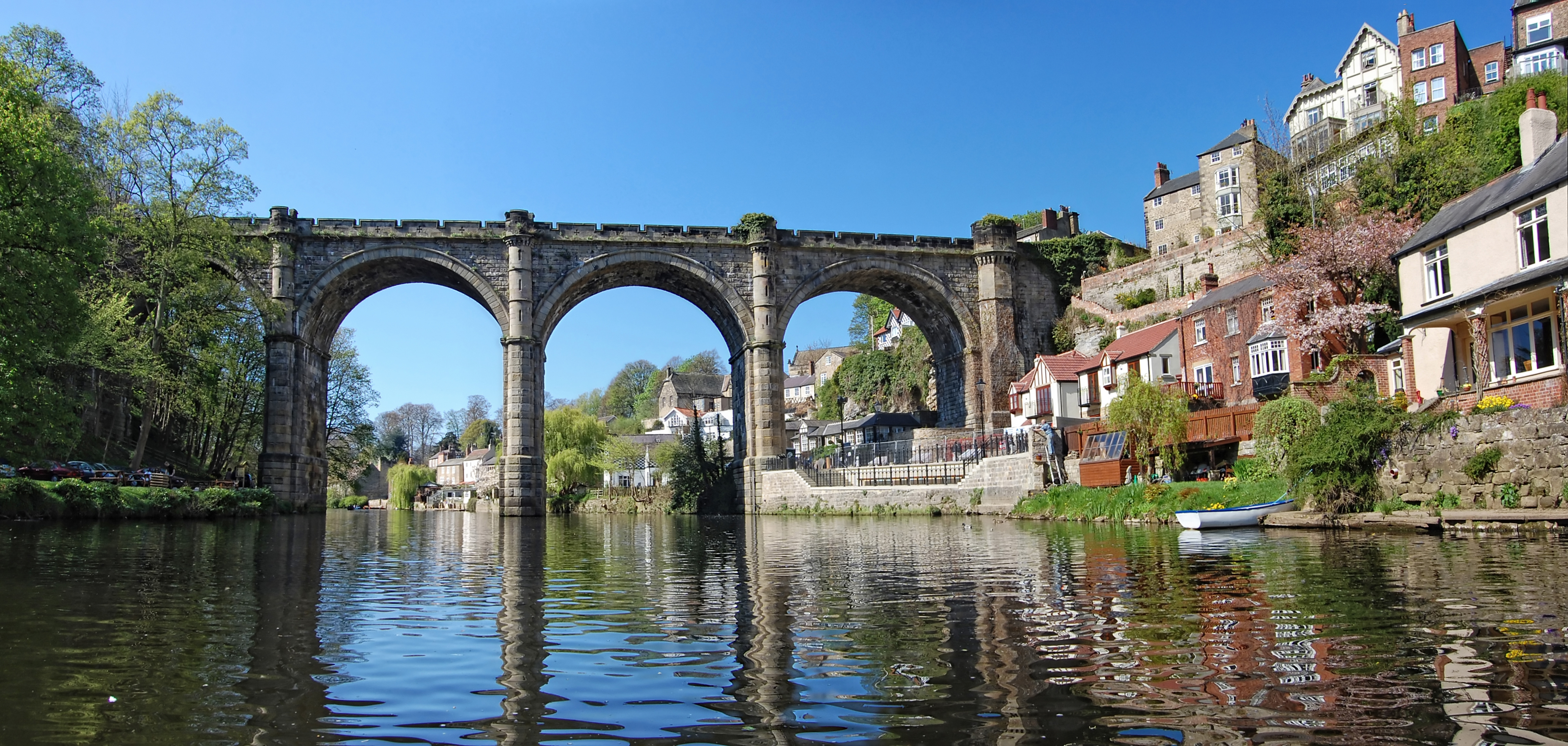
- Railway Viaduct over the River Nidd in Knaresborough; 54°10′23″N 1°59′53″W

- Location within Yorkshire and the Humber Location within England
- Etymology: Probably a Celtic word meaning "bright, brilliant, shining"

Location
- Country: England

Physical characteristics
- Source
  - location: Nidd Head Spring, 1.3 km north of the summit of Great Whernside
  - elevation: 595 metres (1,952 ft)
- Mouth
  - location: River Ouse, Nun Monkton
  - coordinates: 54°0′51″N 1°13′8″W
  - elevation: 13 metres (43 ft)
- Length: 94.45 kilometres (58.69 mi)
- Basin size: 516 square kilometres (199 sq mi)

Basin features
- River system: Swale–Ouse

The River Nidd is a tributary of the River Ouse in the English county of North Yorkshire. It rises in Nidderdale at Nidd Head Spring on the slopes of Great Whernside. In its first few miles it has been dammed three times, creating Angram Reservoir, Scar House Reservoir and Gouthwaite Reservoir, which attract a total of around 150,000 visitors a year. It joins the River Ouse at Nun Monkton.

The upper river valley, Nidderdale, was designated as an Area of Outstanding Natural Beauty in 1994.

The Yorkshire Dales Rivers Trust has a remit to conserve the ecological condition of the River Nidd from its headwaters to the Humber estuary.

== Course ==
The Nidd rises in Nidderdale at Nidd Head Spring on the slopes of Great Whernside in the Yorkshire Dales. It flows east into Angram and Scar House reservoirs before turning south just downstream of Newhouses. In normal conditions the river disappears underground into the sinkhole known as Manchester Hole. If Scar House reservoir overflows, water flows past Manchester Hole to Goyden Pot, another sinkhole. In severe floods, the river flows past Goyden Pot down the valley. The water sinking into the Nidderdale caves reappears at the rising Nidd Head to the south of the village of Lofthouse.

Below Lofthouse the river is joined by How Stean Beck, and turns south-south-east towards Ramsgill before flowing into Gouthwaite Reservoir. Continuing on the same heading, the first major settlement is reached at Pateley Bridge. Turning more south-easterly, it flows past Glasshouses and Summerbridge, where it turns south again past Dacre Banks. Passing by Darley, the river turns east before reaching Birstwith, where it flows south-east to Hampsthwaite. A series of large bends in the river take the flow north, east and then south, and east again, to enter Nidd Gorge.

Below the gorge, the river meanders south-east through the town of Knaresborough, heading north and looping south again as it enters flatter terrain. Near Little Ribston it meanders south-easterly and easterly, crossing underneath the A1 and the A1(M) near the small village of Cowthorpe. The river continues meandering past Cattal north-easterly towards Moor Monkton, towards its junction with the River Ouse at Nun Monkton.

=== Water levels ===
| Monitoring Station | Station Elevation | Low water level | High water level | Record high level |
|---|---|---|---|---|
| Gouthwaite Reservoir | 122.53 m (402.0 ft) | 0.08 m (0.26 ft) | 1.10 m (3.6 ft) | 3.40 m (11.2 ft) |
| Pateley Bridge | 113.06 m (370.9 ft) | 0.14 m (0.46 ft) | 2.5 m (8.2 ft) | 3.73 m (12.2 ft) |
| Birstwith | 70.9 m (233 ft) | 0.11 m (0.36 ft) | 1.5 m (4.9 ft) | 3.66 m (12.0 ft) |
| Knaresborough | 36.86 m (120.9 ft) | 0.42 m (1.4 ft) | 1.3 m (4.3 ft) | 2.16 m (7.1 ft) |
| Hunsingore | 18.14 m (59.5 ft) | 0.08 m (0.26 ft) | 0.85 m (2.8 ft) | 2.92 m (9.6 ft) |
| Skip Bridge | 7.58 m (24.9 ft) | 0.22 m (0.72 ft) | 2.36 m (7.7 ft) | 5.06 m (16.6 ft) |

- Low and high water levels are an average figure.

== Reservoirs ==
The two most northerly reservoirs on the course of the river were built to provide water to the Bradford area in the early 1900s by way of the Nidd Aqueduct. As of 2017, they are maintained by Yorkshire Water.

=== Angram Reservoir ===
The reservoir takes its name from Angram, a settlement in the township of Stonebeck Up, submerged when the reservoir was built. Completed in 1919 with a dam height of 61 metres (200 ft) covering 34 hectares with a volume of 1,041 million gallons and a depth of 33.4 metres (110 ft).

=== Scar House Reservoir ===
A temporary village was built at Scar House to house the workers building the reservoirs and some remains can still be seen. The old Village Hall was moved to Darley, where it now serves as the local Village Hall. The dam at Scar House was completed in 1936. The dam height is 71 m (233 ft) with the reservoir covering area 70 hectares and a depth of36.3 metres (119 ft) giving a volume of 2,200 million gallons. The reservoir is fed almost exclusively from the Angram dam.

=== Gouthwaite Reservoir ===
Gouthwaite reservoir is designated a Site of Special Scientific Interest. It provides a compensation release for the river. It covers an area of 312 acres (126 ha).

The Nidd can overflow the reservoirs, flooding the caves in the valley. In such cases the river overflows into the normally dry river bed past Lofthouse through to Gouthwaite Reservoir.

== Geology ==
The head of the river is located on moorland and the river character is affected by the run-off levels from the three reservoirs. The upper valley is primarily millstone grit with fluvioglacial deposits. The overlying soil is prone to water-logging due to its slow permeability, being composed of loamy soils on top of clay with peat on the top layer. Around Lofthouse there are outcrops of Upper Yoredale limestone, which is more permeable than millstone grit and has created the Nidderdale Caves, where the river flows underground.

Lower down on the flood plain, the nature of the underlying ground is Magnesian Limestone over alluvium and terrace drift deposits. On top of this is a combination of slowly permeable and well drained fine loam over clay.

Where the river passes through the Nidd Gorge, Carboniferous (Namurian) and Upper Permian rock is exposed.

== Etymology ==
The etymology of the name remains unknown but the name is either Celtic or Pre-Celtic (as with most rivers in Western Europe). A derivation from Celtic meaning brilliant or shining has been suggested (as in Old Irish níamda), as has a link to the older Indo-European root *-nedi, simply meaning river.

The Nidd likely shares this etymology with the river and town of Neath (Welsh Nedd) in South Wales and the town of Stratton in Cornwall (originally named Strat-Neth), and with many other rivers across Europe, such as the Nete in Belgium, the Nied in France, Neda in Galicia (NW Spain), the Nethe, Nidda and Nidder in Germany, and the Nida in Poland.

== Leisure ==
Along the river valley can be found the Nidderdale Museum, which is located in Pateley Bridge, and features sections about the traditional agriculture, industries, religion, transport and costume of Nidderdale.

Lower down the river is the town of Knaresborough, which is home to Knaresborough Castle and Knaresborough Museum.

There are many way-marked walking routes throughout the river valley, including the Nidderdale Way, a 55-mile circular walk whose usual starting point is Ripley.

== Lists ==
=== Tributaries ===
==== Above Angram Reservoir ====
- Straight Dike
- Craven Sike
- Long Hill Sike
- Crook Dike

==== Flowing into Angram Reservoir ====
- Stone Beck
- Maiden Gill Beck
- Haw Gill Sike
- Wising Gill Sike

==== Flowing into Scar House Reservoir ====
- Wench Gill
- Shaw Gill Sike
- Stand Sike
- Tops Gill
- Scar House Gill

==== Between Scar House and Gouthwaite Reservoirs ====
- Woo Gill
- Thornet Gill
- Maddering Gill
- Turnacar Gill
- Foggyshaw Gill
- Rough Close Gill
- Limley Gill
- How Gill
- How Stean Beck
- Blayshaw Gill
- Blackstone Gill
- Boggle Dike
- Ramsgill Beck
- Lul Beck

==== Flowing into Gouthwaite Reservoir ====
- Byerbeck Gill
- Knott's Gill
- Colt House Gill
- Riddings Gill
- Stubnooks Gill
- Burn Gill

==== Below Gouthwaite Reservoir ====
- Dauber Gill
- Foster Beck
- Rash Dike
- Fosse Dike
- Byril Beck
- Fell Beck
- Loftshaw Gill
- Smelt Maria Dike
- Clough Gill
- Darley Beck
- Fringill Dike
- Old Mill Race
- Tang Beck
- Cockhill Beck
- Ripley Beck/Old Nidd
- Newton Beck
- Oak Beck
- Bilton Beck
- Frogmire Dike
- The Rampart
- Gundrifs Beck
- Crimple Beck/River Crimple
- Broad Wath
- Fleet Beck
- Kirk Hammerton Beck
- Pool Beck

=== Settlements ===
- Lofthouse
- Ramsgill
- Wath
- Pateley Bridge
- Bewerley
- Glasshouses
- Low Laithe
- New York
- Summerbridge
- Dacre Banks
- Darley
- Birstwith
- Hampsthwaite
- Clint
- Killinghall
- Knaresborough
- Little Ribston
- Walshford
- Cowthorpe
- Hunsingore
- Cattal
- Moor Monkton
- Nun Monkton

=== Crossings ===
List of crossings of the River Nidd

== Gallery ==
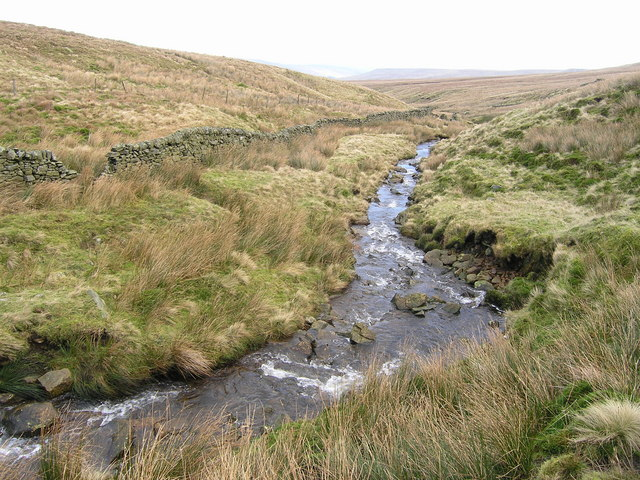
River Nidd less than 0.6 miles (1 km) from the source

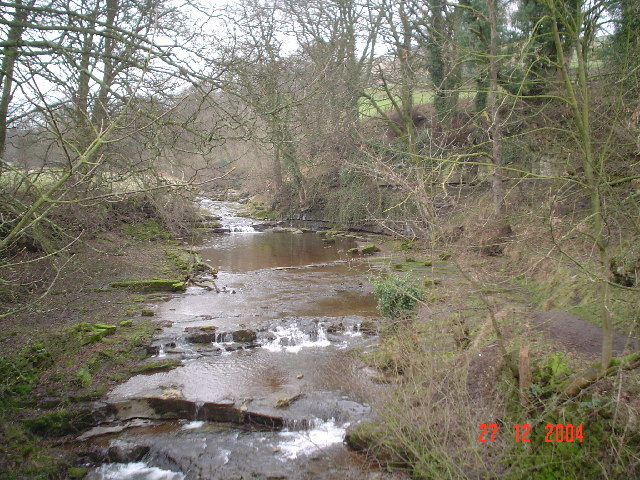
River Nidd at Lofthouse

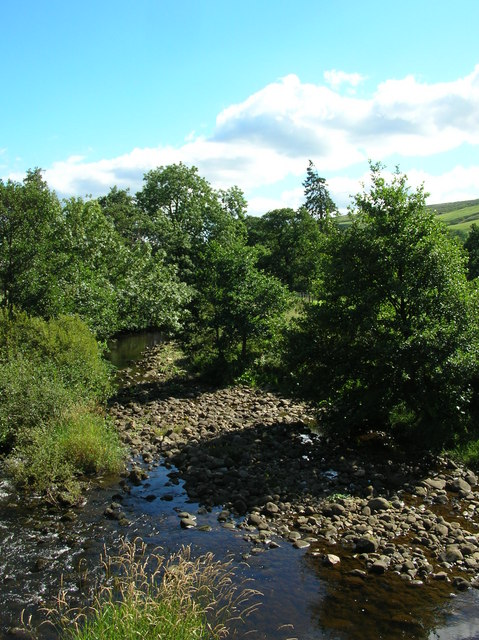
River Nidd near West House Farm

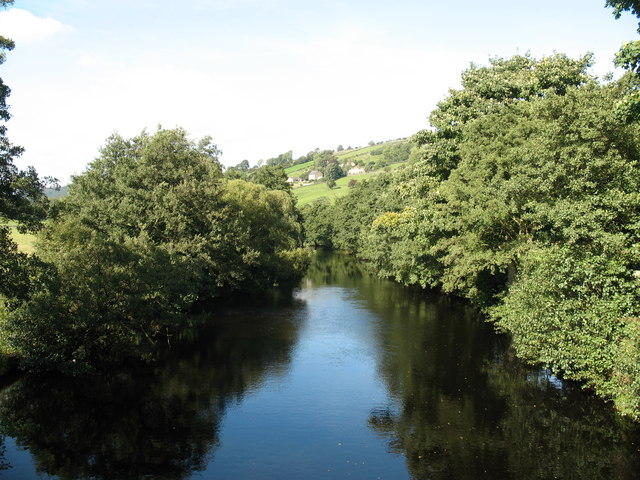
River Nidd near Pateley Bridge

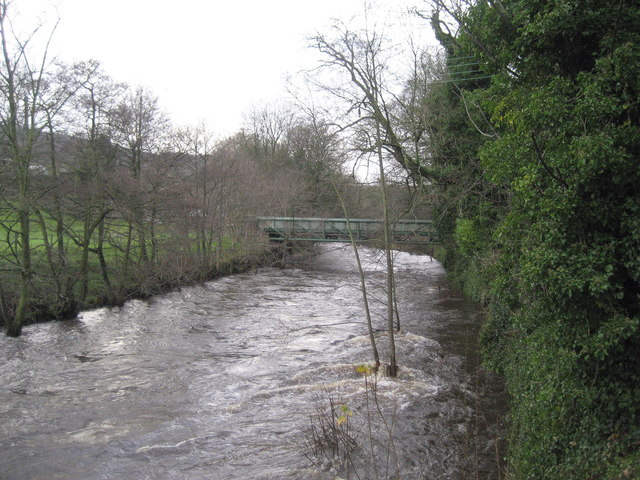
River Nidd at Glasshouses

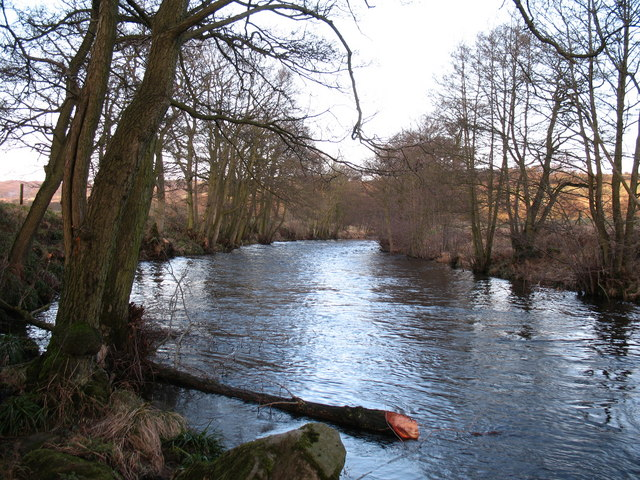
River Nidd below Dacre

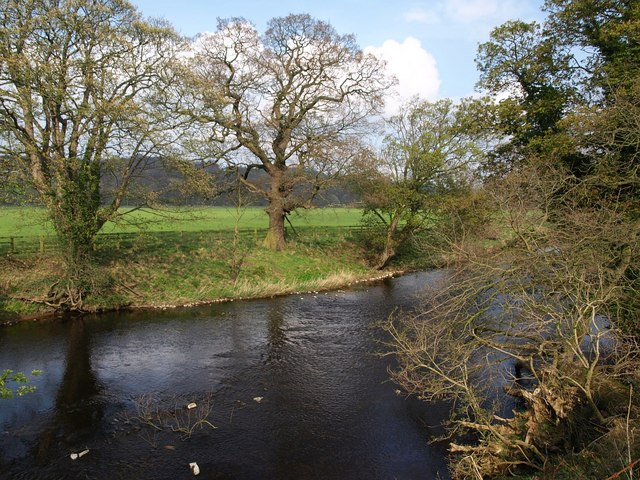
River Nidd between Birstwith and Hampsthwaite

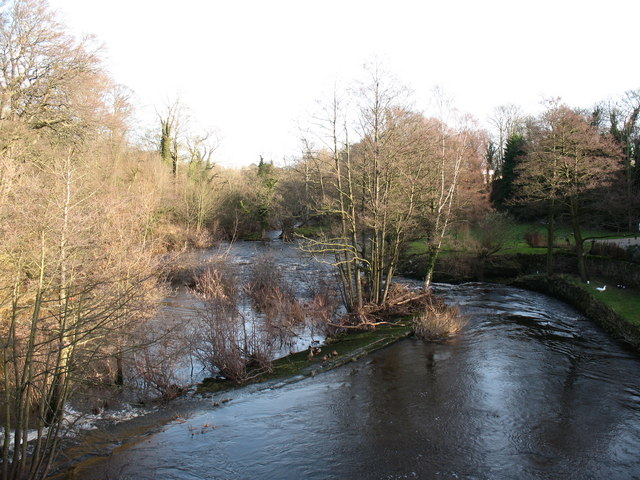
River Nidd from Killinghall Bridge

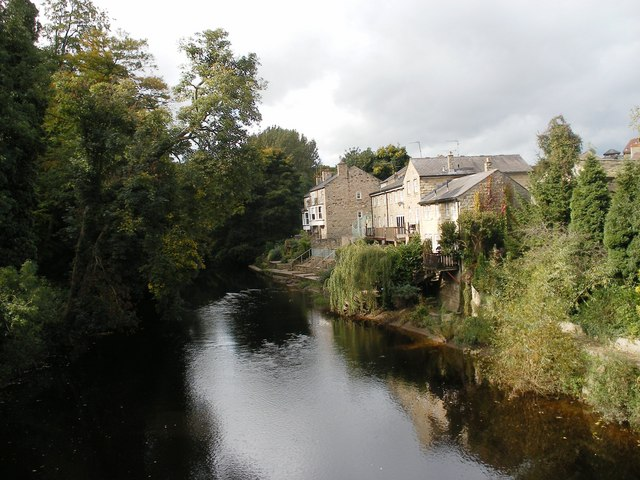
The River Nidd at Knaresborough

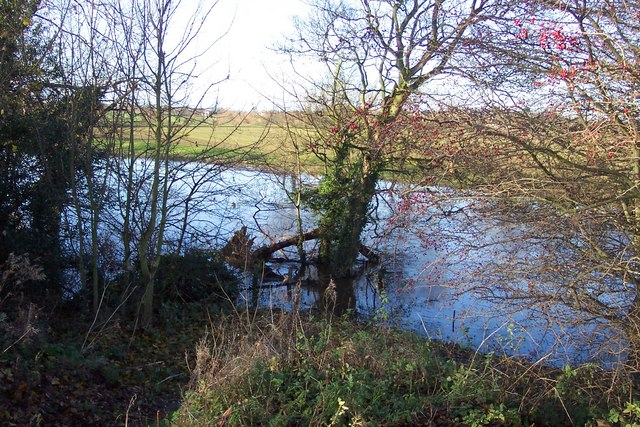
River Nidd near Tockwith Road

== Sources ==
Ordnance Survey Maps

- Lower Wharfedale & Upper Washburn Valley (297)
- Nidderdale (298)
- Yorkshire Dales – Northern & Central Areas (OL 30)
