= Gouthwaite Reservoir =

Reservoir in North Yorkshire, England

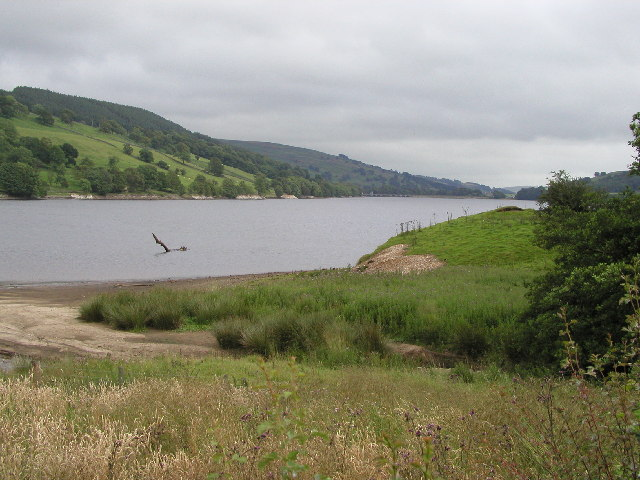
- Gouthwaite Reservoir

- Location within North Yorkshire
- Location: England
- Coordinates: 54°6′51″N 1°47′47″W
- Type: reservoir
- Primary inflows: River Nidd
- Primary outflows: River Nidd
- Basin countries: United Kingdom
- Surface area: 312 acres (126 ha)
- Shore length^{1}: 4.9 miles (7.9 km)
- Surface elevation: 433 feet (132 m)
- ^{1} Shore length is not a well-defined measure.

Gouthwaite Reservoir is in Nidderdale, North Yorkshire, England. It is one of many reservoirs in the area, others include Roundhill Reservoir and Angram Reservoir.

Gouthwaite is a compensation reservoir for the River Nidd, i.e. it maintains the downstream flow of the river during periods of high and low rainfall.

== History ==
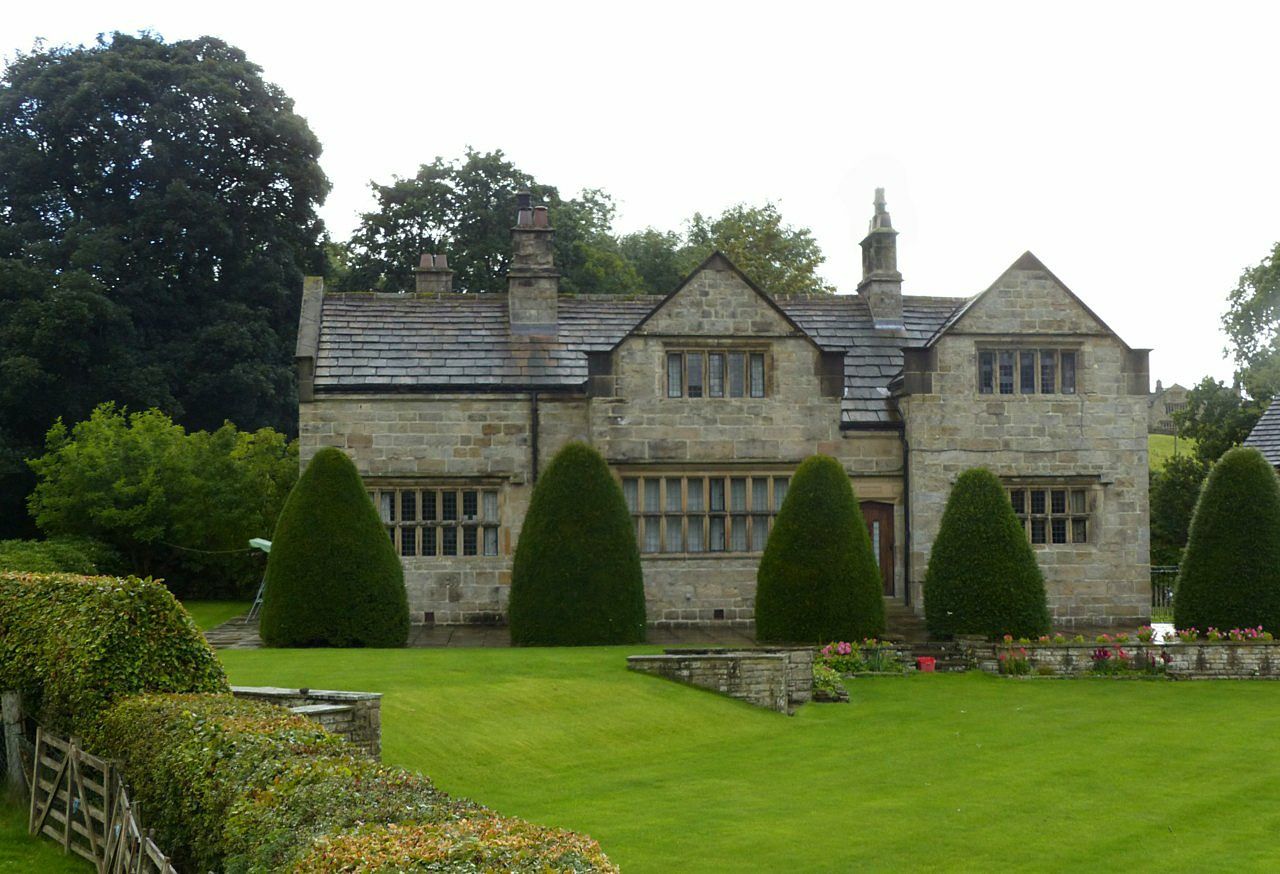
The relocated Gouthwaite Hall

The reservoir was constructed between 1893 and 1901. The Elizabethan manor house of Gouthwaite White Hall, the ancient home of the Yorke family, was submerged beneath its waters. Gouthwaite Hall was rebuilt beside the reservoir with materials from the old hall, and is now a Grade II listed building. The Hall is known in theatre history for performances by travelling players hosted by John Yorke at Christmas 1609 and Candlemas 1610, which were denounced by a neighbour Stephen Proctor.

On 1 June 1978, a Royal Air Force Jet Provost aircraft crashed into the reservoir killing the pilot. His body and most of the aircraft were recovered in the following days.

== Birdwatching ==
Gouthwaite Reservoir is a nature reserve and a Site of Special Scientific Interest (SSSI). The reservoir is independently owned by the Gouthwaite Management Board, but they are advised by Yorkshire Water and the Environment Agency, who have created viewing areas for bird watchers on the edge of the reservoir. Tree and shrub cover along the shoreline provides a habitat for small birds such as willow warbler and blackcap. Other records include woodland specialists like great spotted woodpecker and nuthatch. The green woodpecker has also been recorded.

In winter, after the summer migrants have gone, the reservoir margins are good for fieldfares and redwings. On the reservoir itself, Canada geese are always present and are joined during the autumn and winter by goosanders and goldeneye accompanied by mallard, tufted duck and pochard. Whooper swans from Iceland frequently join them.

Winter is also a good time for birds of prey with buzzards, red kites, hen harriers, merlins and kestrels being observed around the reservoir and the surrounding moorland. Ospreys and golden eagles are frequently observed on passage.
