= Nidderdale =

Valley in Yorkshire, England

Coordinates: 54°05′12″N 1°45′28″W

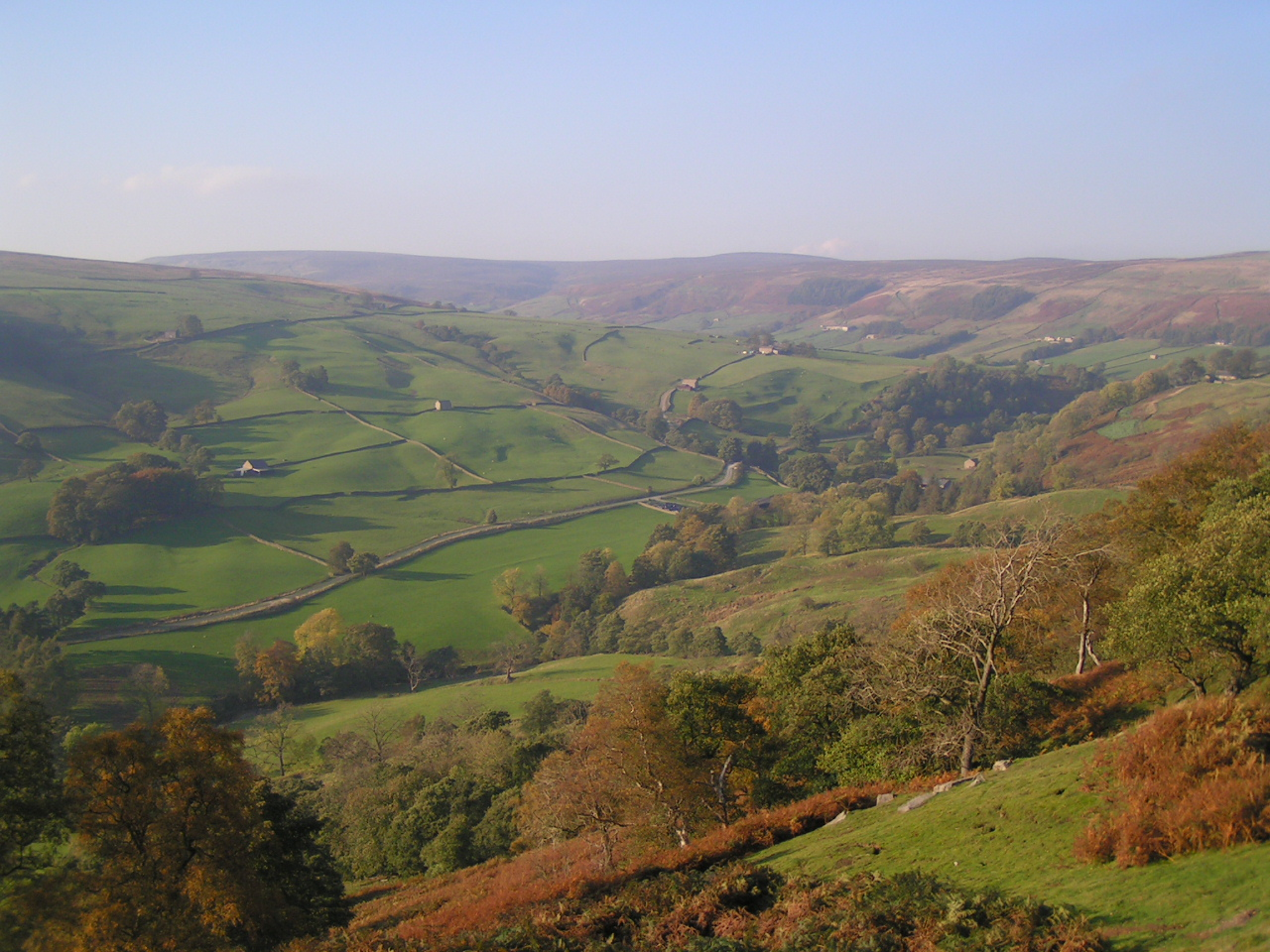
Upper Nidderdale

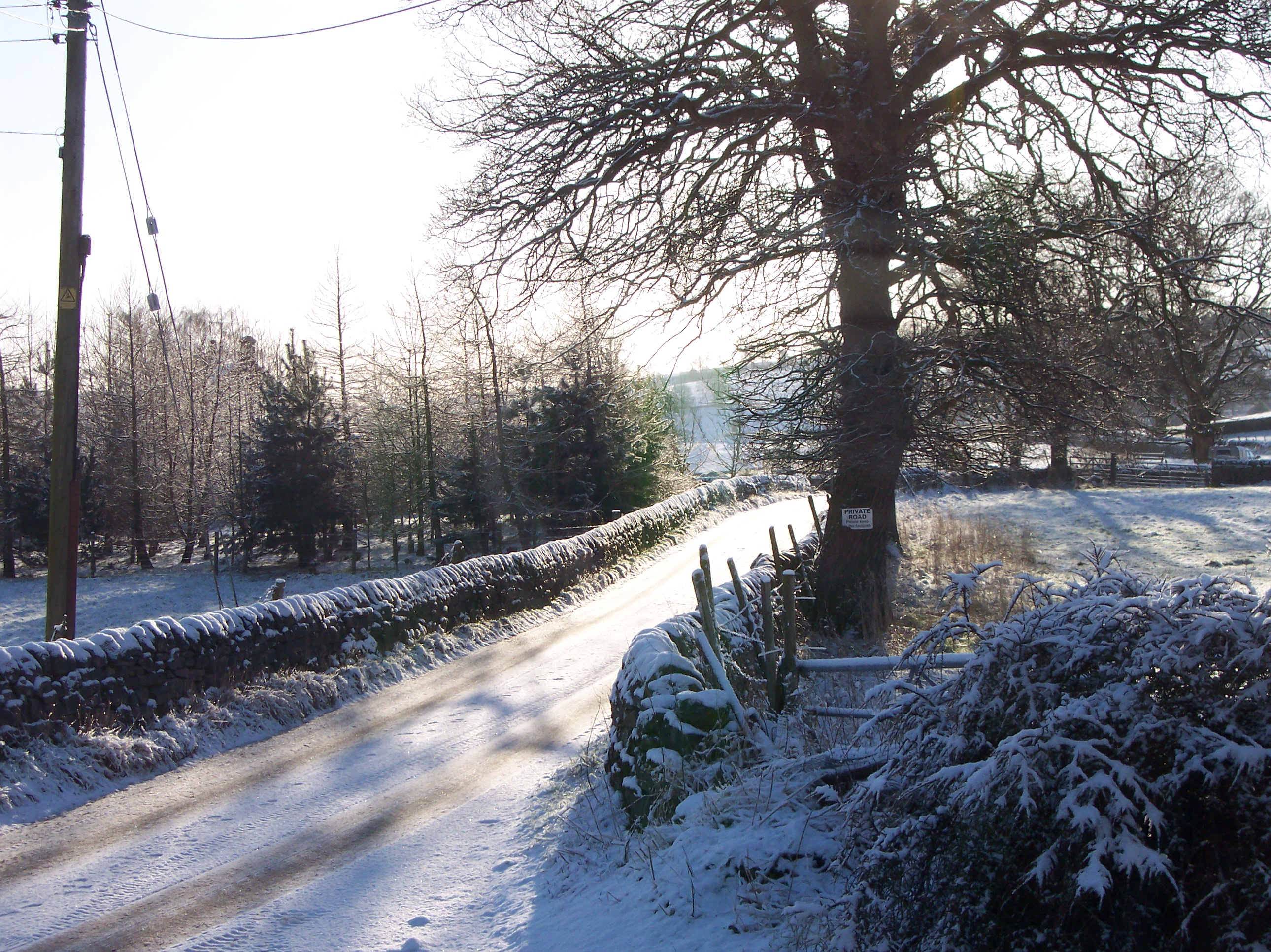
Winter in Nidderdale

Nidderdale, historically also known as Netherdale, is a valley in North Yorkshire, England. It is one of the Yorkshire Dales, which are part of the Pennines. It is named after the River Nidd, which rises on Great Whernside at the head of the dale. Nidderdale is not within the Yorkshire Dales National Park, but is protected as part of the Nidderdale National Landscape.

The only town in the dale is Pateley Bridge. Other settlements include Wath, Ramsgill, Lofthouse, and Middlesmoor above Pateley Bridge, and Bewerley, Glasshouses, Summerbridge, Dacre, Darley, Birstwith, Hampsthwaite and Kettlesing below Pateley.

== Nidderdale National Landscape ==
Nidderdale was designated an Area of Outstanding Natural Beauty in 1994. In 2023 AONBs adopted the name National Landscape, to reflect their national importance. The NNL covers a much wider area than Nidderdale. In addition to Nidderdale itself (above Hampsthwaite), the NNL includes part of lower Wharfedale, the Washburn Valley and part of lower Wensleydale, including Jervaulx Abbey and the side valleys west of the River Ure. The highest point in the Nidderdale National Landscape is Great Whernside, 704 metres above sea level, on the border with the Yorkshire Dales National Park.

The NNL Web site provides directions for popular walks and offers information on canoeing and kayaking, caving, climbing, cycling, fishing and horse riding.

== Local government ==
Nidderdale was historically in the West Riding of Yorkshire, and in the Lower Division of Claro Wapentake. In the 19th century local government reforms most of the dale fell within the Pateley Bridge Poor Law Union, later the Pateley Bridge Rural Sanitary District and from 1894 Pateley Bridge Rural District. In 1937 the rural district was merged to become part of Ripon and Pateley Bridge Rural District. Hampsthwaite and Felliscliffe in the lower dale fell within Knaresborough Poor Law Union, later Knaresborough Rural Sanitary District and from 1894 Knaresborough Rural District, which merged in 1938 to become part of Nidderdale Rural District.

In 1974 Nidderdale was transferred to the new county of North Yorkshire, and from 1974 to 2023 the whole dale fell within the Borough of Harrogate. It is now administered by the unitary North Yorkshire Council.

== Transport ==
A horse-drawn omnibus service (the Nidderdale Omnibus) started operating on 1 August 1849 and ran between Pateley Bridge and Ripley station (later renamed Nidd Bridge station) on the Leeds and Thirsk Railway. In 1862 the North Eastern Railway opened the Nidd Valley Railway from Ripley Junction (between Harrogate and Nidd Bridge stations) to Pateley Bridge. Between 1907 and 1937 the Nidd Valley Light Railway served the dale above Pateley Bridge. The Pateley Bridge branch closed in 1964.

A motor bus began operating between Harrogate and Pateley Bridge in 1923. In 1924 the Harrogate Road Car company began to operate the route, and when that company introduced route numbers in 1927 the service was given the number 24. The number 24 service has continued to run on the same route to the present day, operated by West Yorkshire Road Car Company (the name adopted by Harrogate Road Car Company in 1927) until 1988, when West Yorkshire was split into smaller companies, and since then by the buses of Harrogate Bus Company.

Nidderdale is also served by DalesBus services from York, Bradford and Keighley.

== Filming location ==
All Creatures Great and Small (2020 TV series) was filmed mostly in the Yorkshire Dales with many of the Dales scenes filmed in Wharfedale and Nidderdale. For example, the crossroads that are so important in the Christmas episode are "on the roads above Pateley Bridge" in Nidderdale.
