= Hay-a-Park Gravel Pit =

Site of Special Scientific Interest in North Yorkshire, England

- Site of Special Scientific Interest
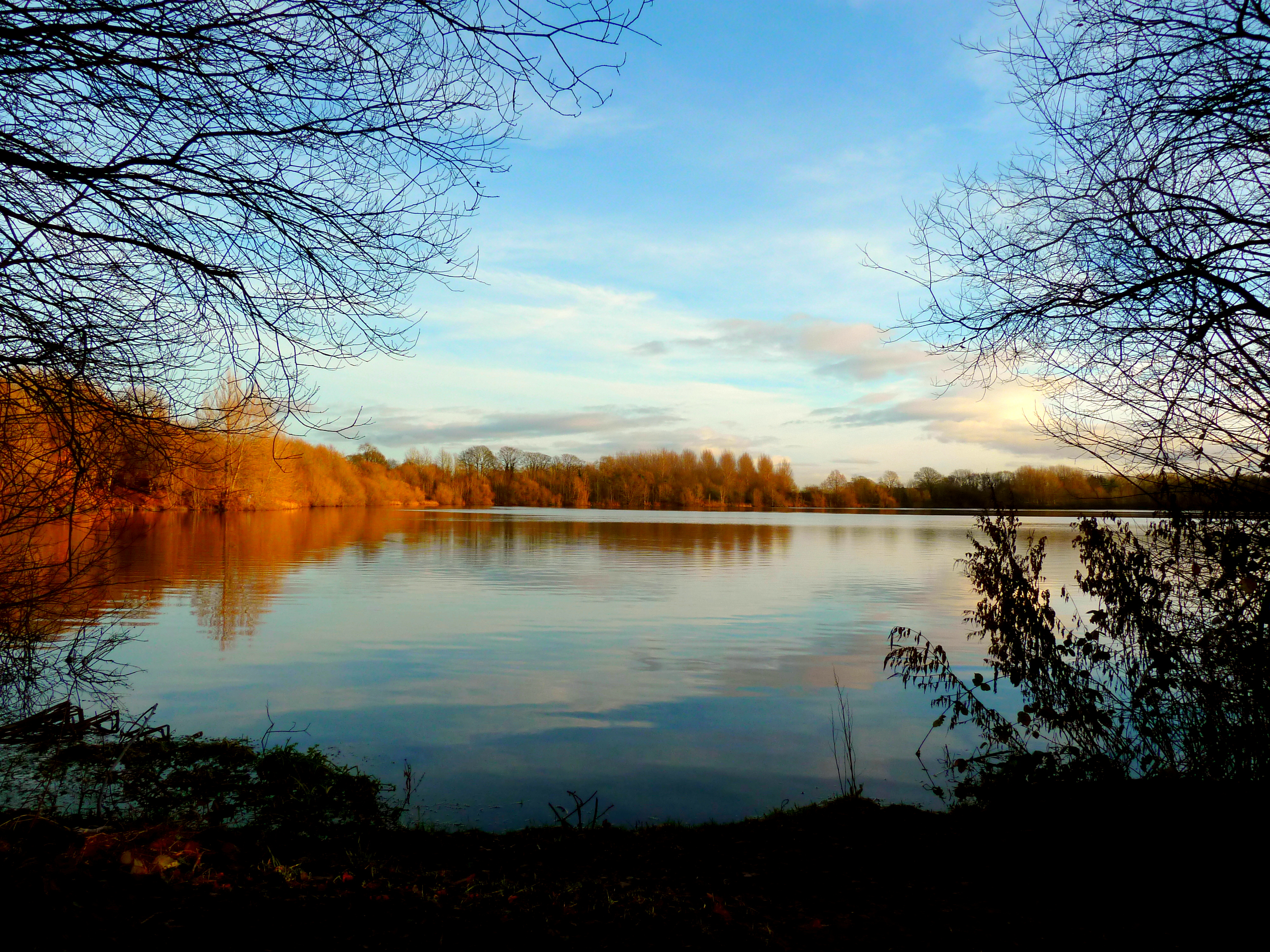
- Hay-a-Park Lake

- Location within North Yorkshire
- Location of Hay-a-Park Gravel Pit.
- Area of search: North Yorkshire
- Grid reference: SE362580
- Coordinates: 54°00′54″N 01°27′00″W
- Interest: Biological
- Area: 44.8687 hectares (0.4487 km^{2}; 0.1732 sq mi)
- Notification date: 15 June 1995
- Location map: Magic Map (Defra)

Hay-a-Park Gravel Pit is a Site of Special Scientific Interest, or SSSI, adjacent to the east side of the town of Knaresborough, North Yorkshire, England. Having been a disused and flooded quarry since the 1970s, it now consists of the large Hay-a-Park Lake and three smaller ponds, besides associated reedbeds, scrub, woodland and grassland. It was designated as a SSSI in 1995 because it supports a number of wintering birds, including a large flock of goosander. This site is "one of the most northerly inland breeding populations of reed warbler in Britain." Hay-a-Park was once part of a royal park, an early landowner being Edward II.

== Site history ==
The area once belonged to the Crown; then Edward II gave it to his favourite, Piers Gaveston. After Gaveston was executed, it passed back to the Crown, but was subject to poaching for some time. In the 14th century the area was known as Park de la Haye where Edward III bred horses. Edward's fifteen-year-old wife Philippa of Hainault was given this land on the occasion of her marriage; she was later the mother of the Black Prince (whose statue stands in Leeds City Square) and John of Gaunt. (Note: John of Gaunt was Lord of the manor of Knaresborough, and he kept a hunting lodge at Haverah Park near Haya Park.) Another story says that in the 11th or 12th century Henry I conferred the lands to Gamel de Scriven, and they remained in the family under various names including Edward II until the last heir, Sir Charles Slingsby, died falling from his horse into the river in 1869, leaving no issue.

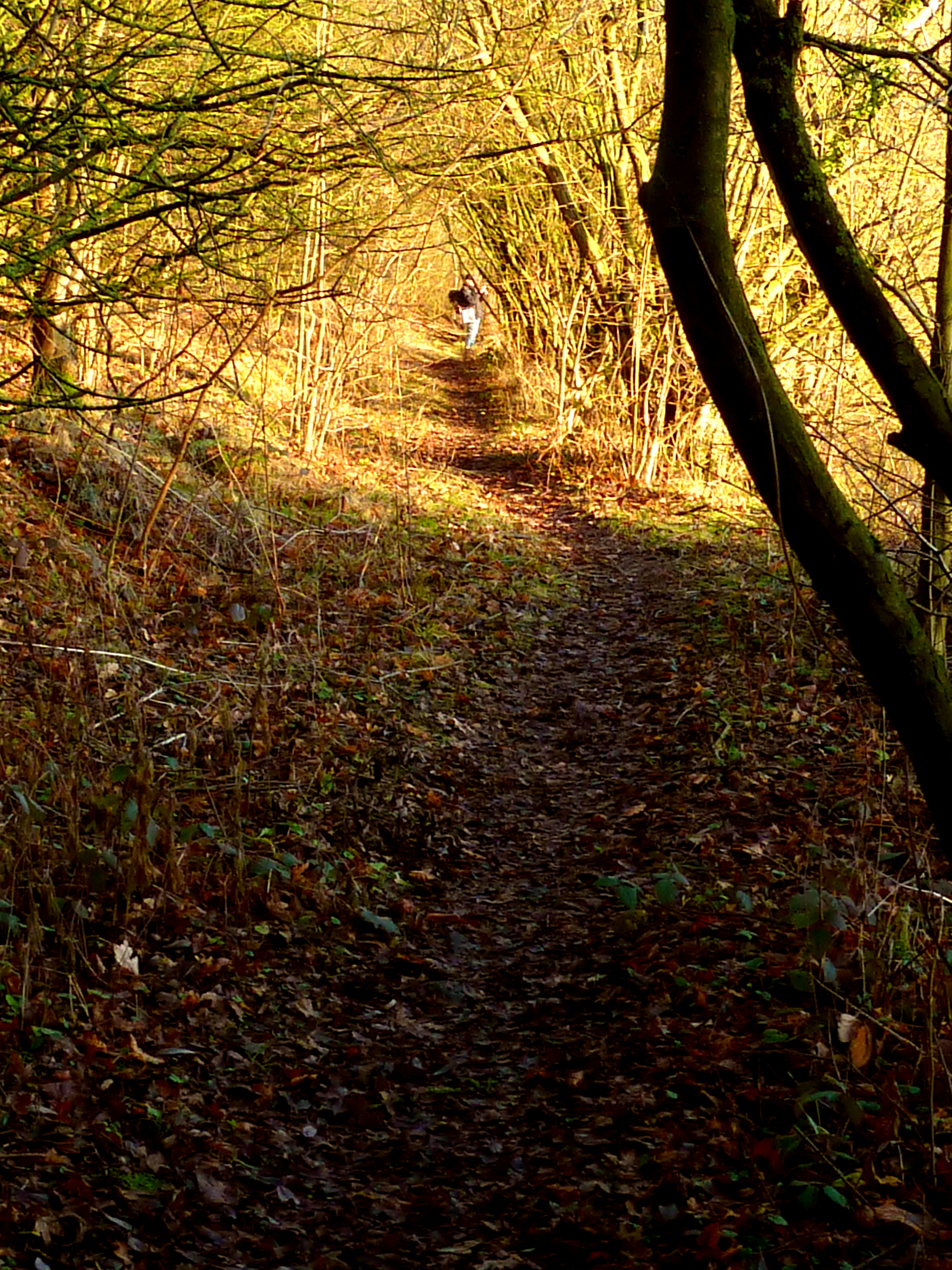
Tree-lined lakeside footpath

The area later became known as Haya Park. By the seventeenth century the land was at least partly wooded, and managed for timber. By the end of that century it was owned by Lady Hewley, who used its rents to support the Church and charities. When its farmland was valued in 1755 by Robert Moody of York, the land was considered potentially good for cultivation, but contemporary farmers were "poor idle drunken ignorant fellows" who spent Sundays in the alehouse; so that the land was "miserably run and full of weeds," with no prospect of land improvement. In the 19th century the leasehold of Haya Park was purchased for the purpose of rectorial tithes by York Minster; it was still a royal park, where deer were protected.

Part of Hay-a-Park later became a gravel works, and the site occupies a section which has been "largely undisturbed since the completion of extraction in the early 1970s."

== Site location and designation ==
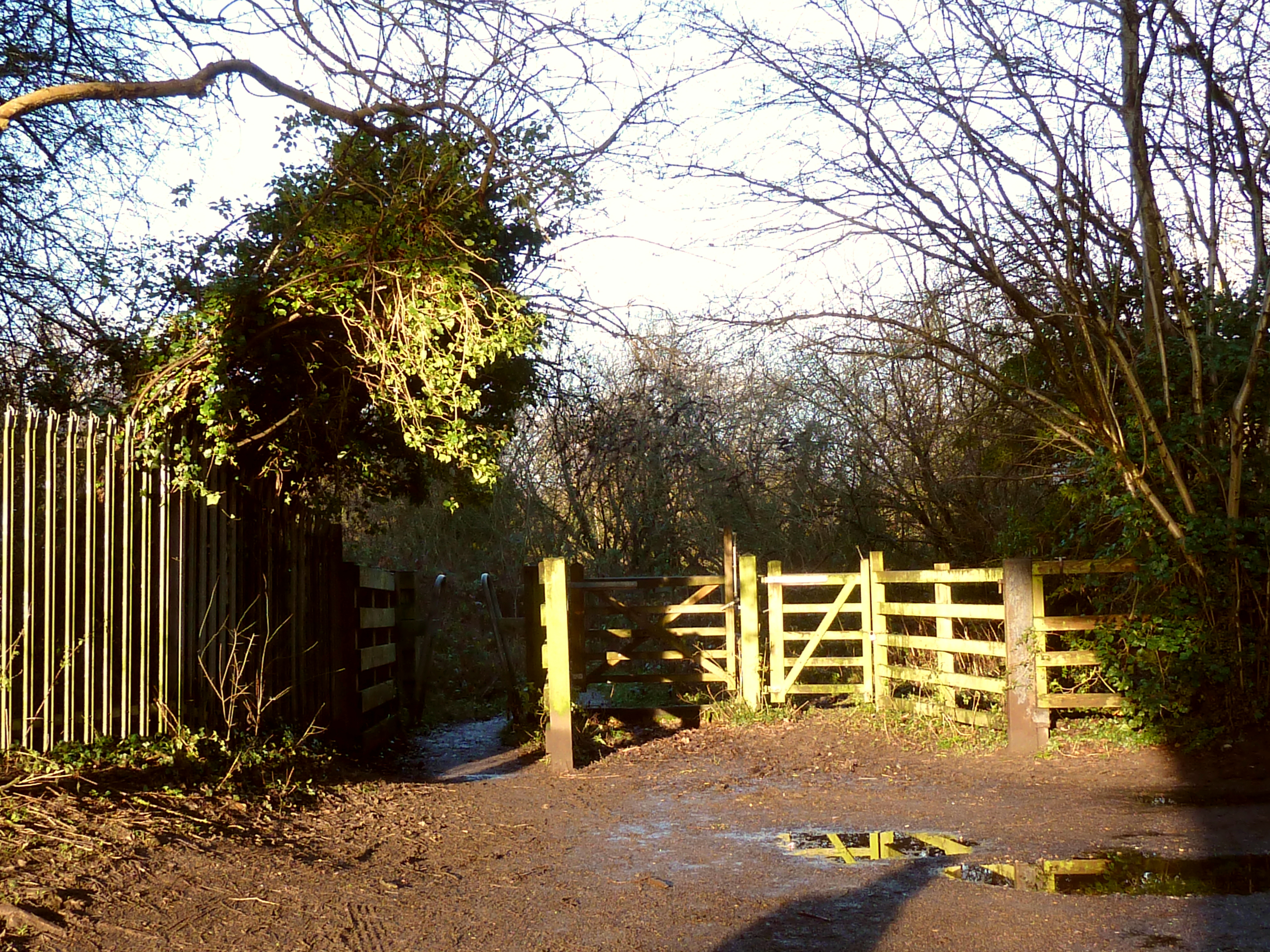
Unlabelled entrance to Hay-a-Park Gravel Pit

Hay-a-Park Gravel Pit is a 44.8687 hectares (0.4487 km^{2}; 0.1732 sq mi) biological Site of Special Scientific Interest (SSSI), consisting of "standing open water and canals." This reserve has no parking area, no visitor facilities, and no official public footpaths. Fishing and swimming are not permitted, and dog-walking is discouraged due to disturbance of water birds. The site is adjacent to the eastern edge of Knaresborough, accessible by public footpath from two unlabelled entrances on Park Lane, one located near the railway bridge, and the other next to Knaresborough Rugby Club.

The site was first notified on 15 June 1995, being "of interest for its breeding birds and wintering wildfowl." It is one of about eight SSSIs in the Harrogate region, others being Ripon Parks, Farnham Mires, Hack Fall Wood, Brimham Rocks, Cow Myers, Kirk Deighton Mar Field Fen, Quarry Moor, and Bishop Monkton Ings. As described by Natural England in 1995, the site contains the 24-hectare Hay-a-Park Lake at the north end of the site, "three small ponds" at the south end, and "associated areas of reedbed, scrub, mature hedgerow and grassland," however as of 2019 much of the scrub had become woodland.

== Significant site content ==
=== Fauna ===
Of "national importance" are the goosander which winter here, numbering up to 315 birds as counted in 1995. Of "local importance" are wigeon, greylag, coot and mallard. In spring, oystercatcher, wigeon and various geese graze on the adjacent field. Tufted duck, mallard and great crested grebe breed on or near Hay-a-Park Lake, as do common sandpiper and ringed plover. Grasshopper warbler and sedge warbler breed on the small ponds. The reed warbler breeds here too, being "one of the most northerly inland breeding populations of reed warbler in Britain." The fly Raphium laticorne has been found in "nine lowland localities" in Yorkshire including at Hay-a-Park, and Campsicnemus marginatus has also been found here.

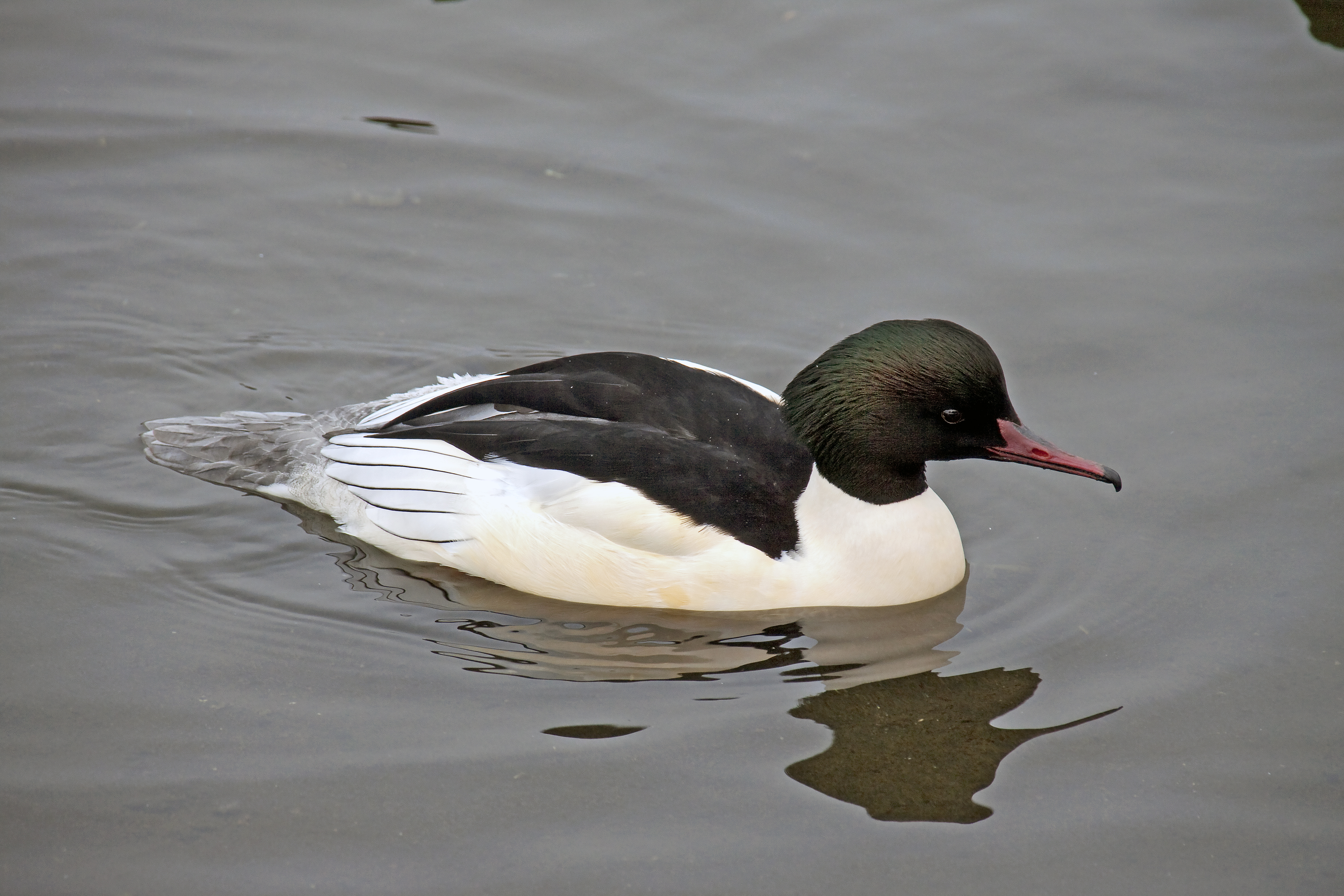
Male goosander

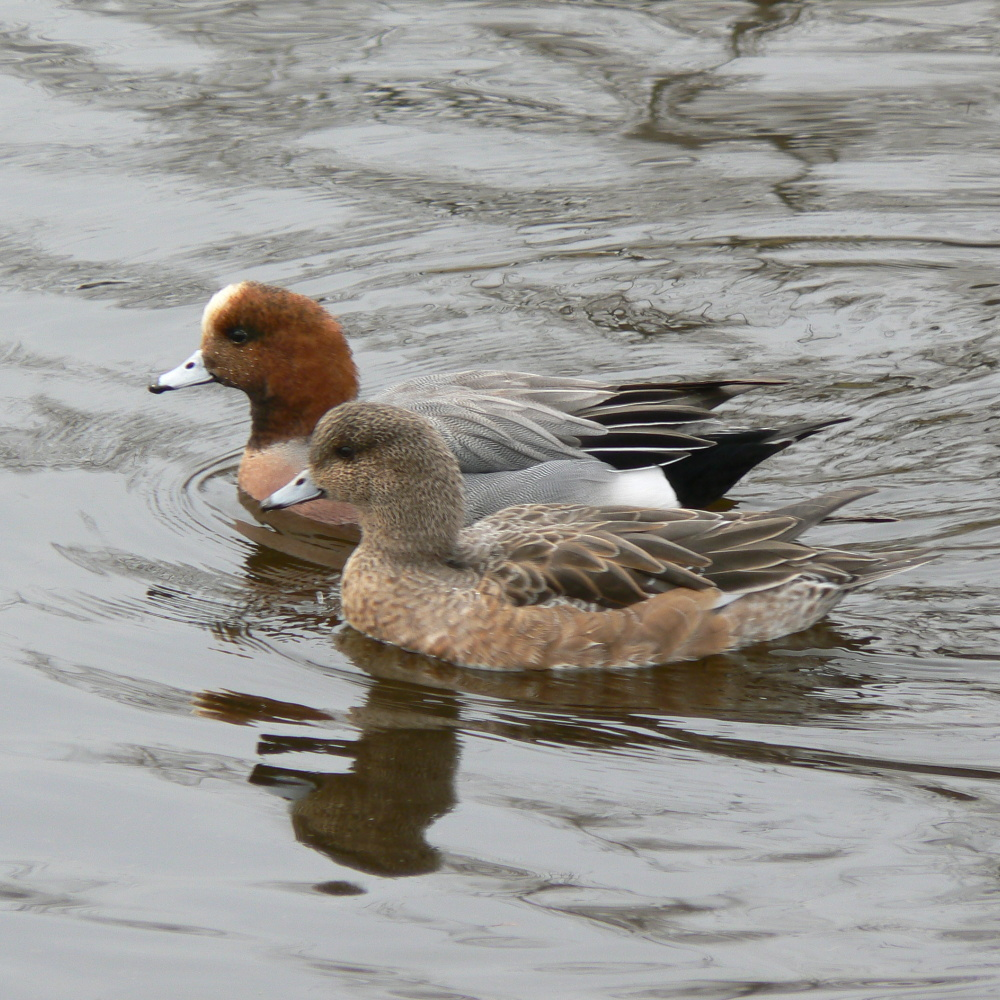
Wigeon

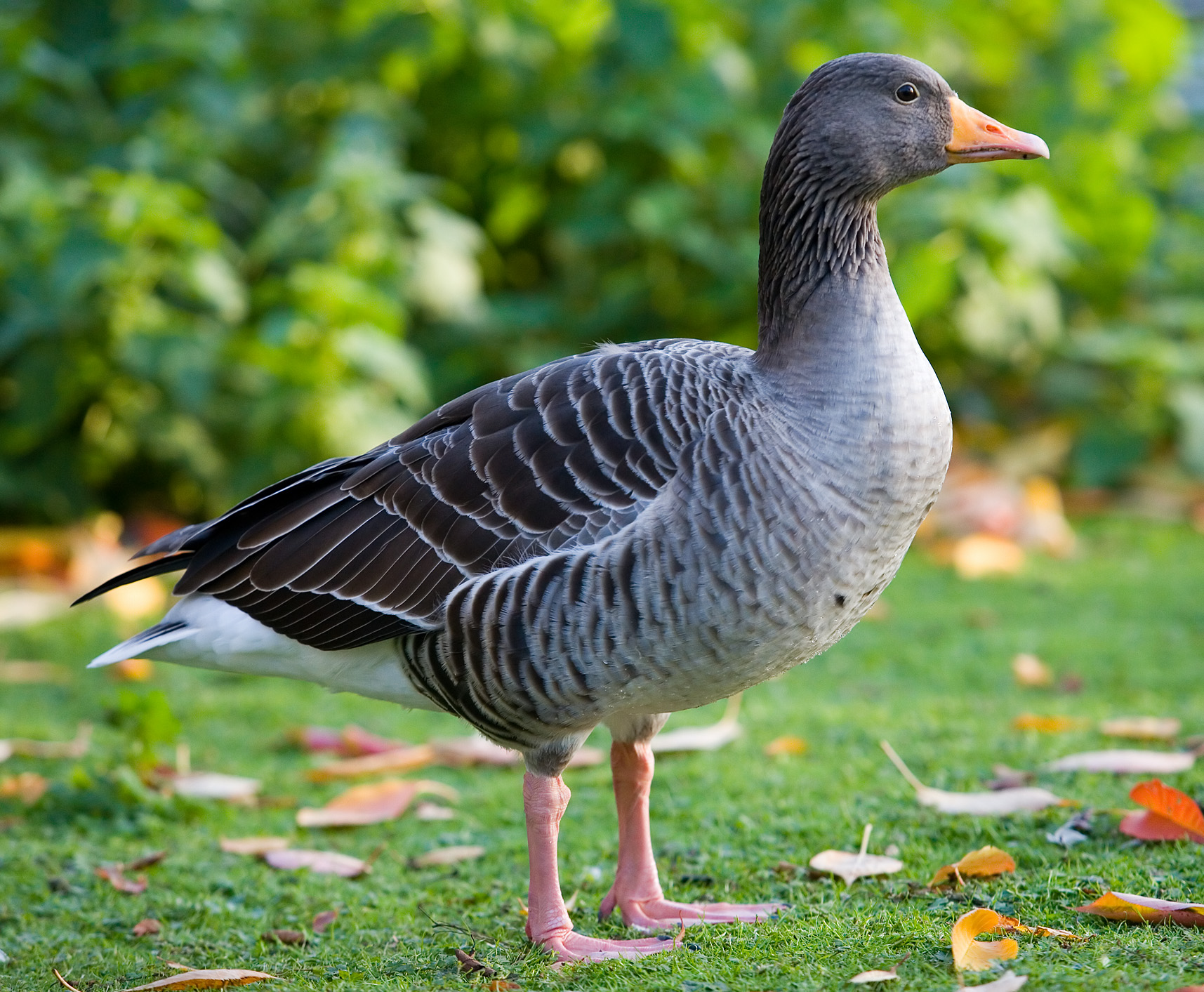
greylag

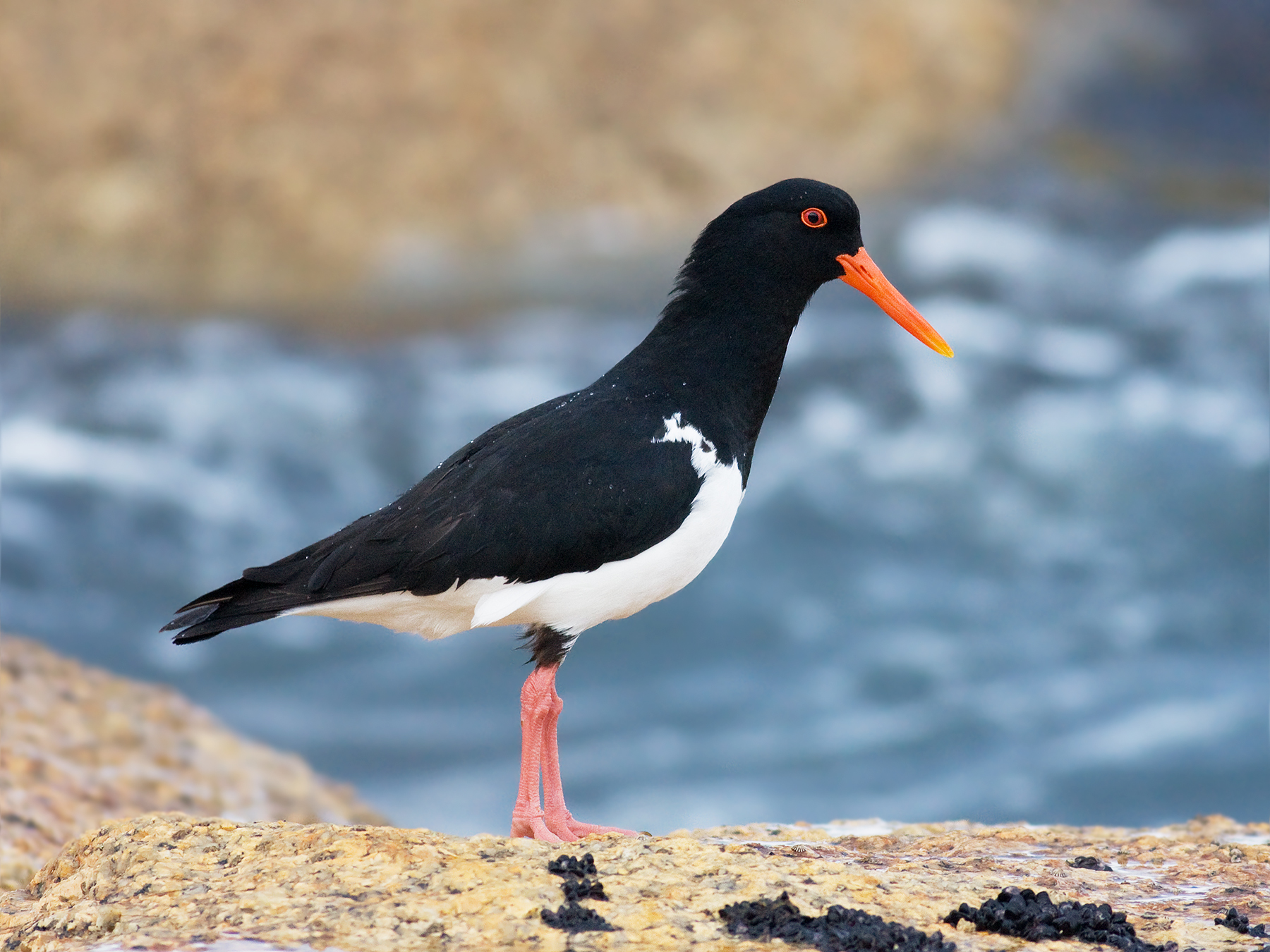
Oystercatcher

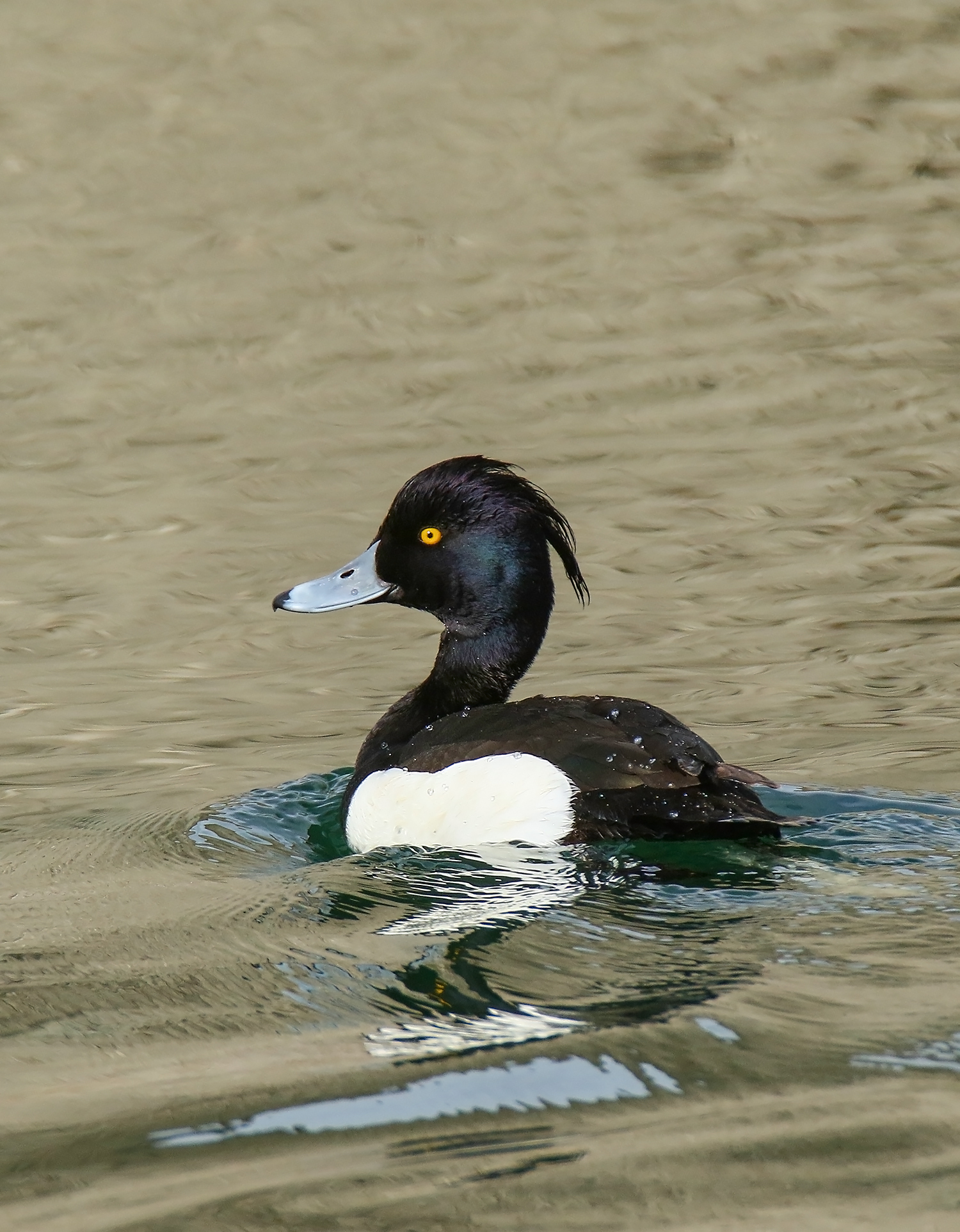
Tufted duck

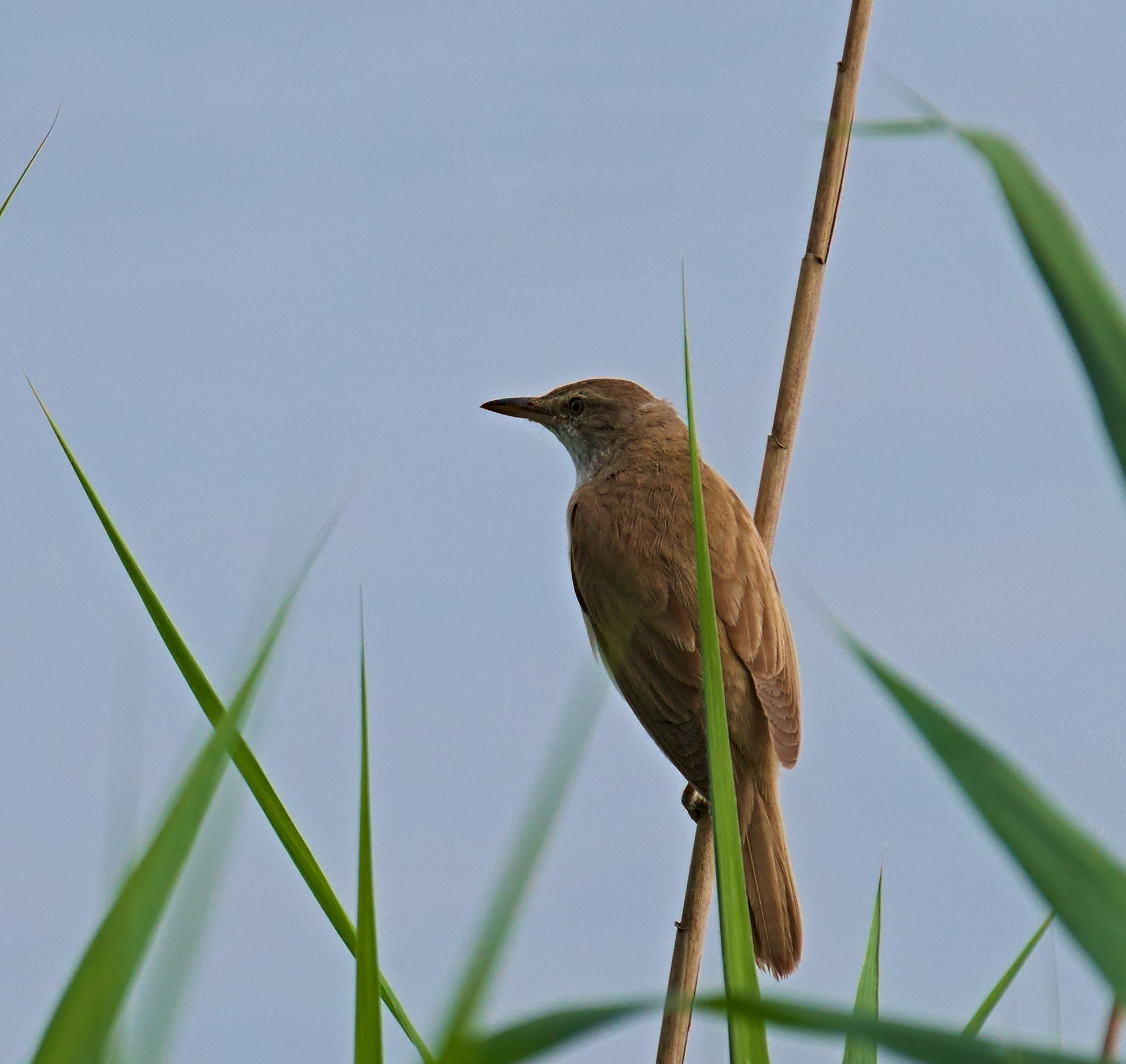
reed warbler

=== Flora ===
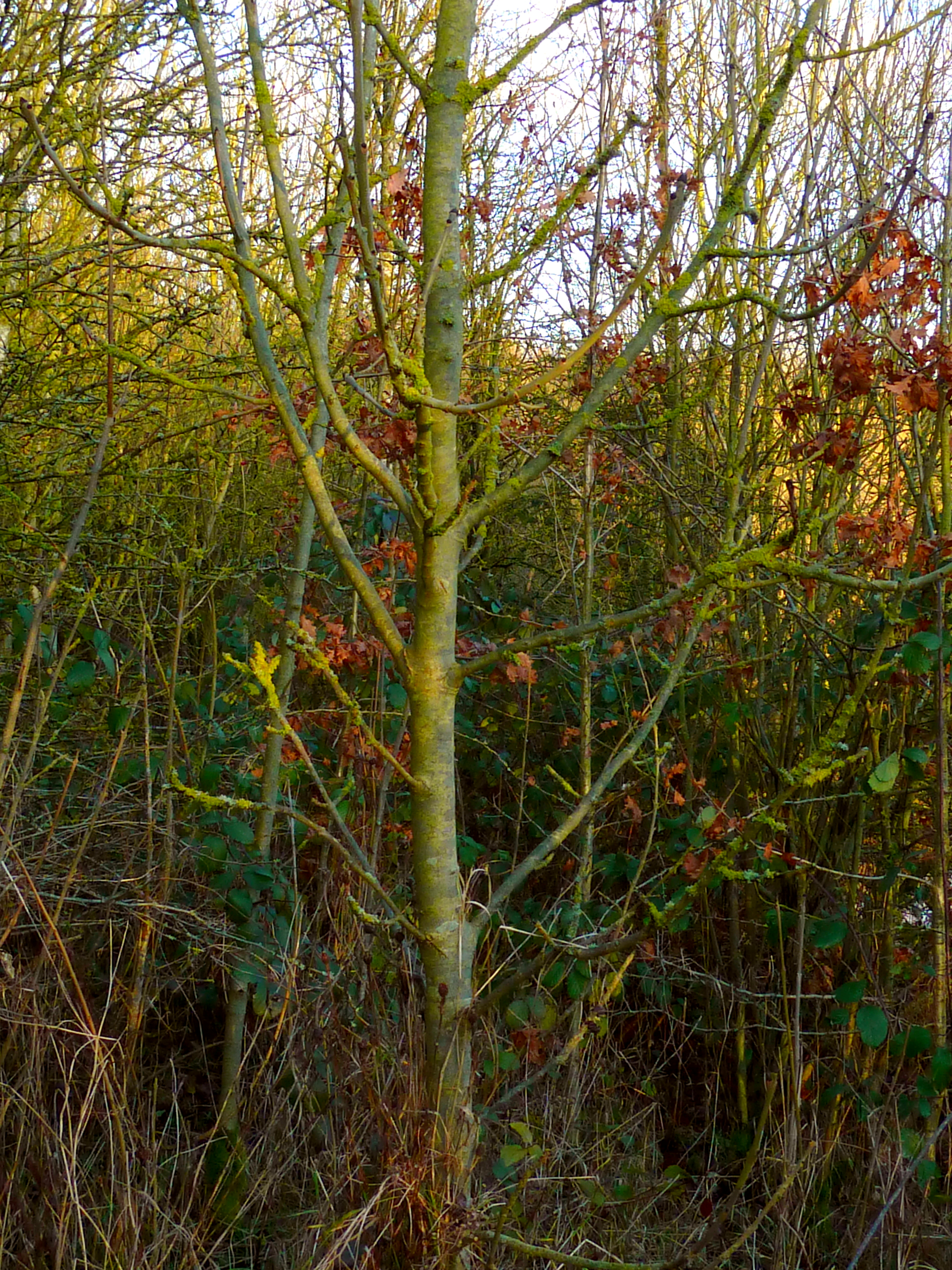
An oak by the lake

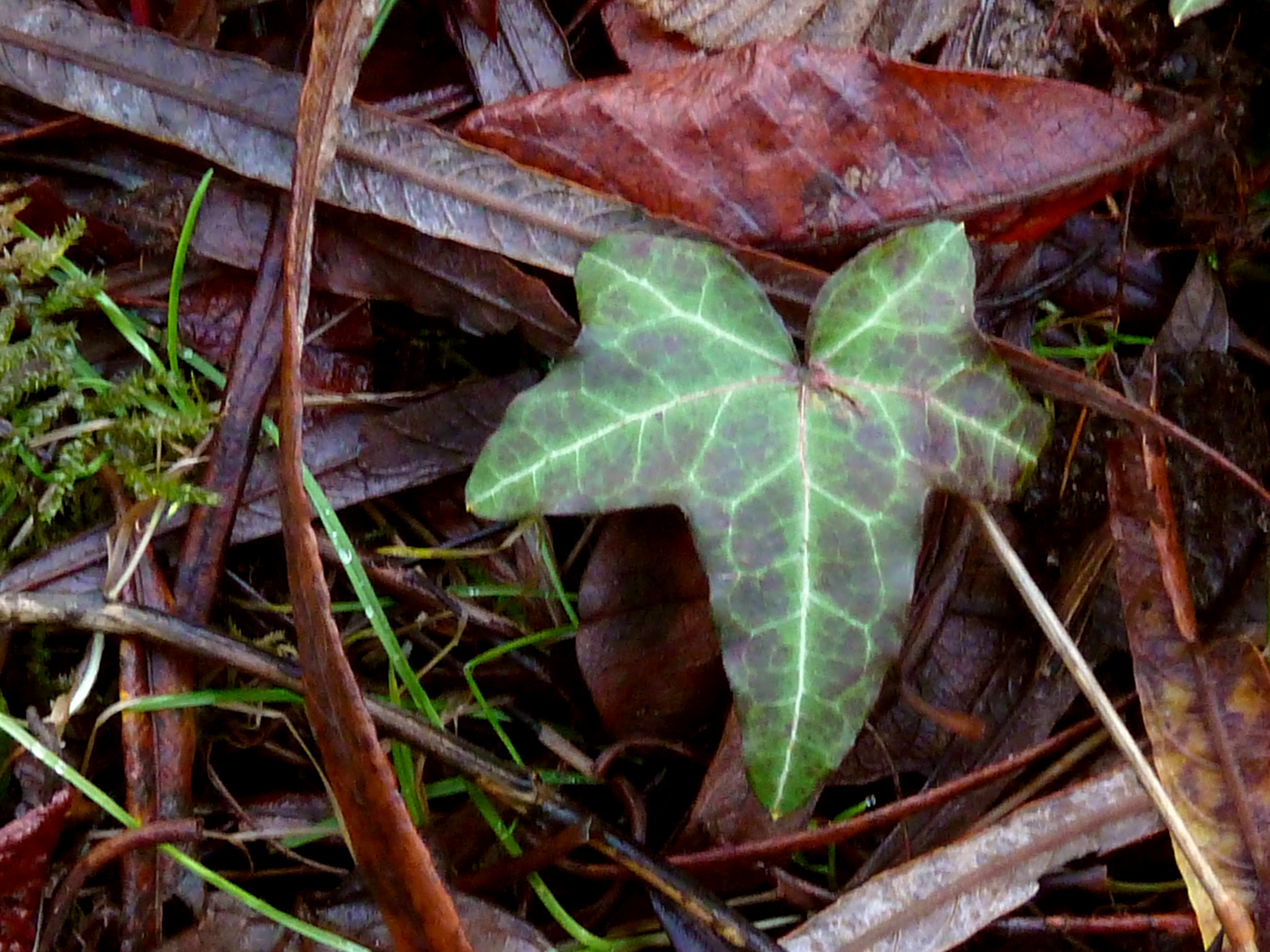
Ivy and willow leaves at the lake edge

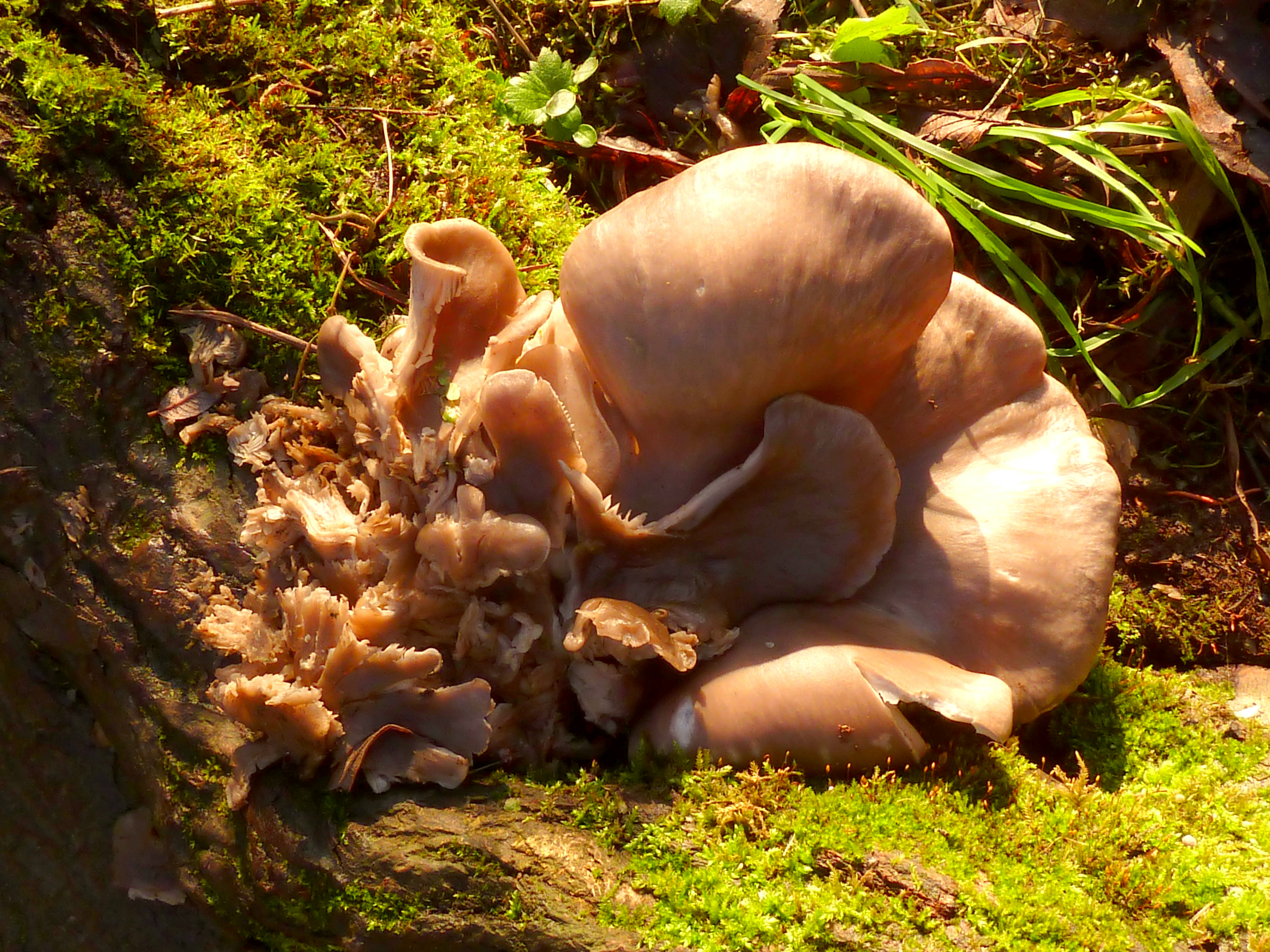
Fungus on tree root

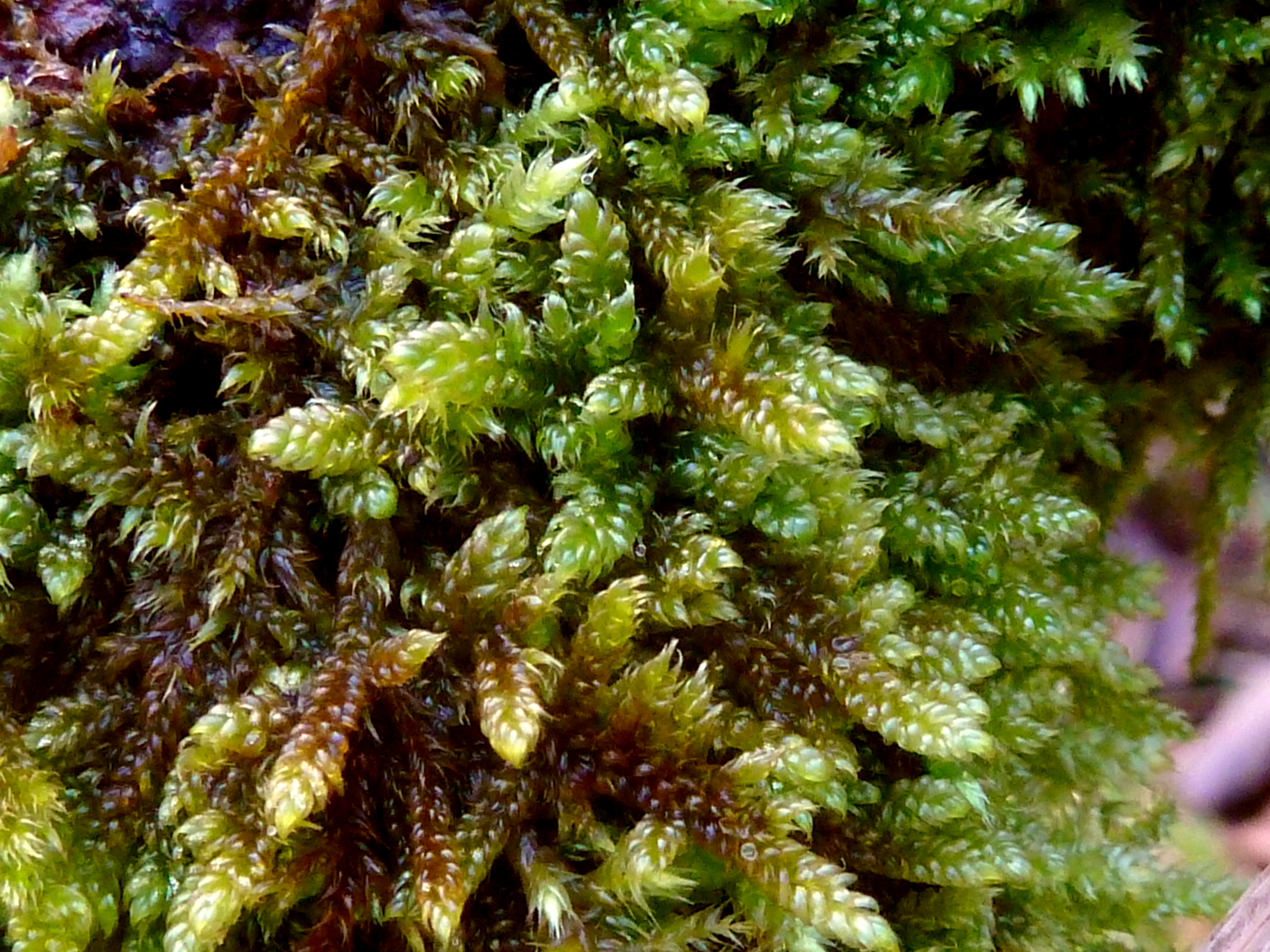
Moss on tree branch

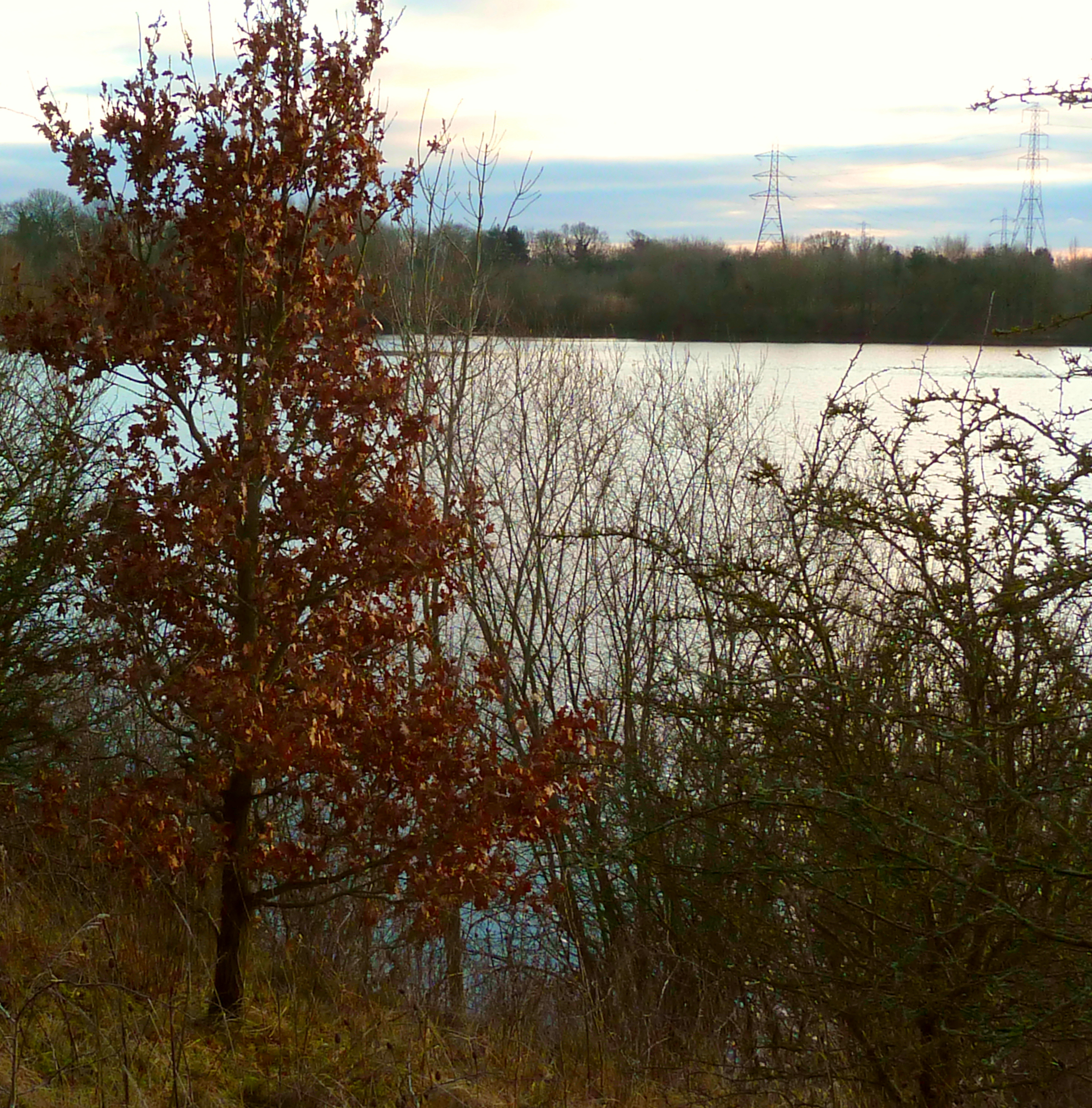
Beech tree

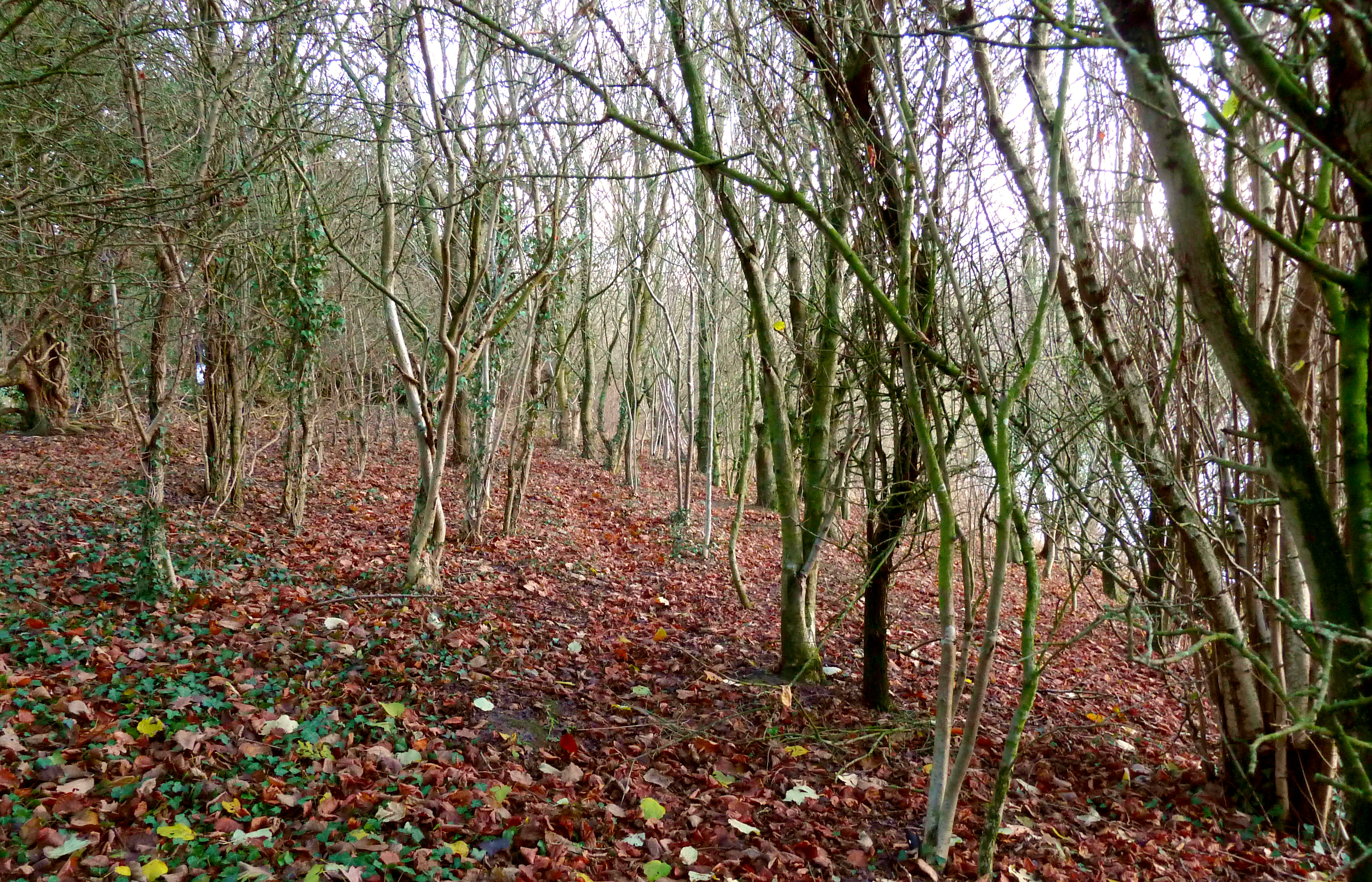
Birch trees

== Maintenance ==
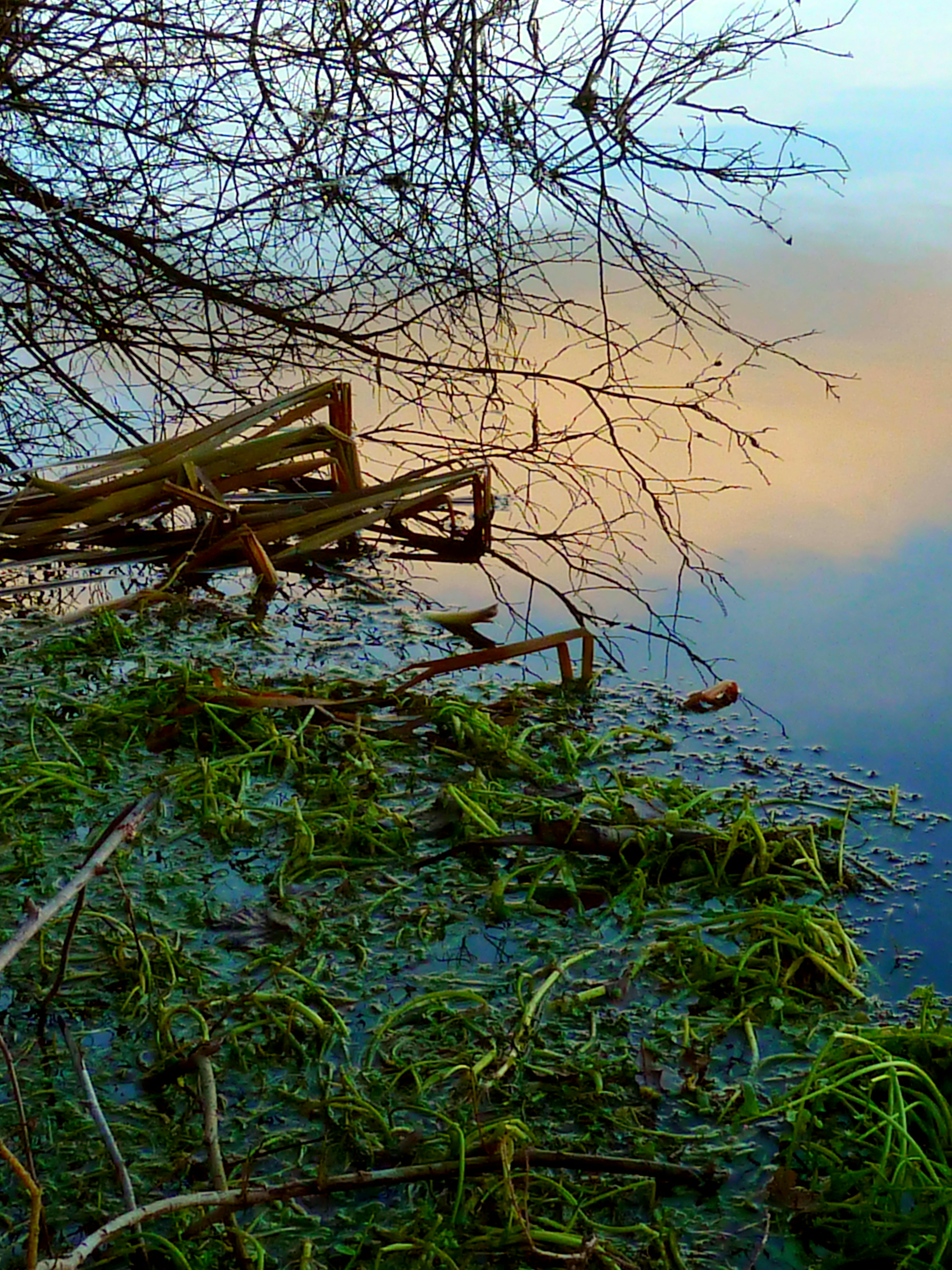
Shallow water area at lake margin

Although the former quarry pit Hay-a-Park Lake may be deep, Natural England recommends that the presence of any shallow water areas be maintained. This is for the benefit of wintering waders and feeding ducks and geese. Shallow waters allow aquatic plants to receive light, thereby allowing breeding conditions for dragonflies and damselflies. "Protection of appropriate water quality" is required, as is regulation of potential incoming water and sediment. "Bottom feeding coarse fish" must be removed, because they may "uproot plants and disturb sediments." "Appropriate nesting and feeding conditions are maintained" with regard to open land, scrub and reeded areas. "Recreational activities should be managed sympathetically to avoid conflict with the management of the waterbody for nature conservation," and "recreational use of woodland should be discouraged" should the site contain a heronry.

== Development and risk assessment ==
A 2012 assessment of the site was "unfavourable, declining." Notices have been erected at two entrance points of the site, to remind the public that there has been a continuing concern about "illegal fishing" here. There are also issues of freshwater fish-stocking, public access and disturbance. A woman was photographed swimming recreationally in the lake in winter 2019, putting greylags to flight. (Note: See image File:Hay-a-Park SSSI (41).JPG) Some visitors to Hay-a-Park have been carrying out three categories of "operations likely to damage the special interest," namely articles 16a, 27 and 28 of Natural England's views about management of the SSSI. Nevertheless, the published audit for the Knaresborough Development Plan of 2016 described the site as being available for recreational use, and designated it as an "important community area" (ICA).

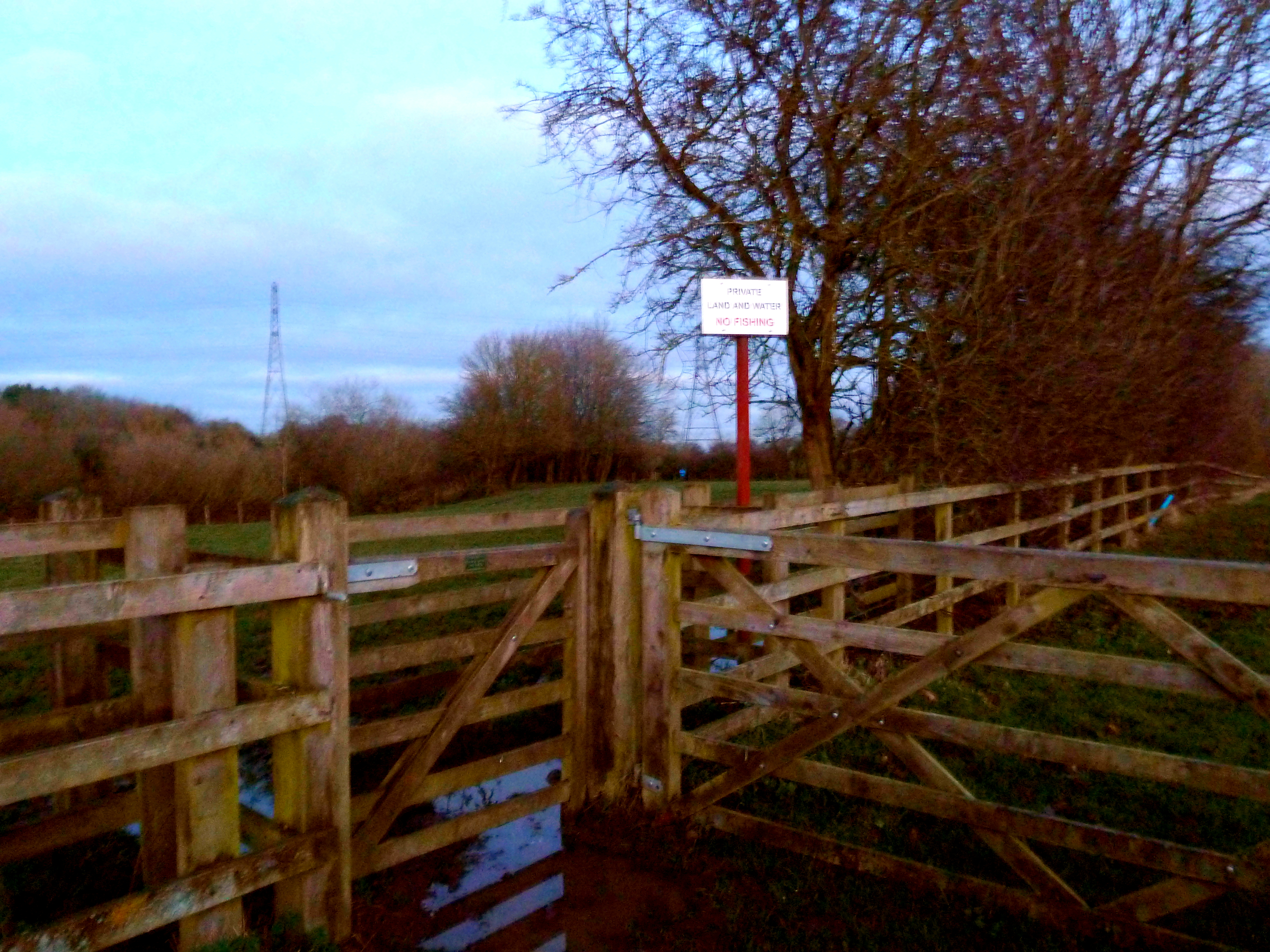
Gate with no-fishing sign

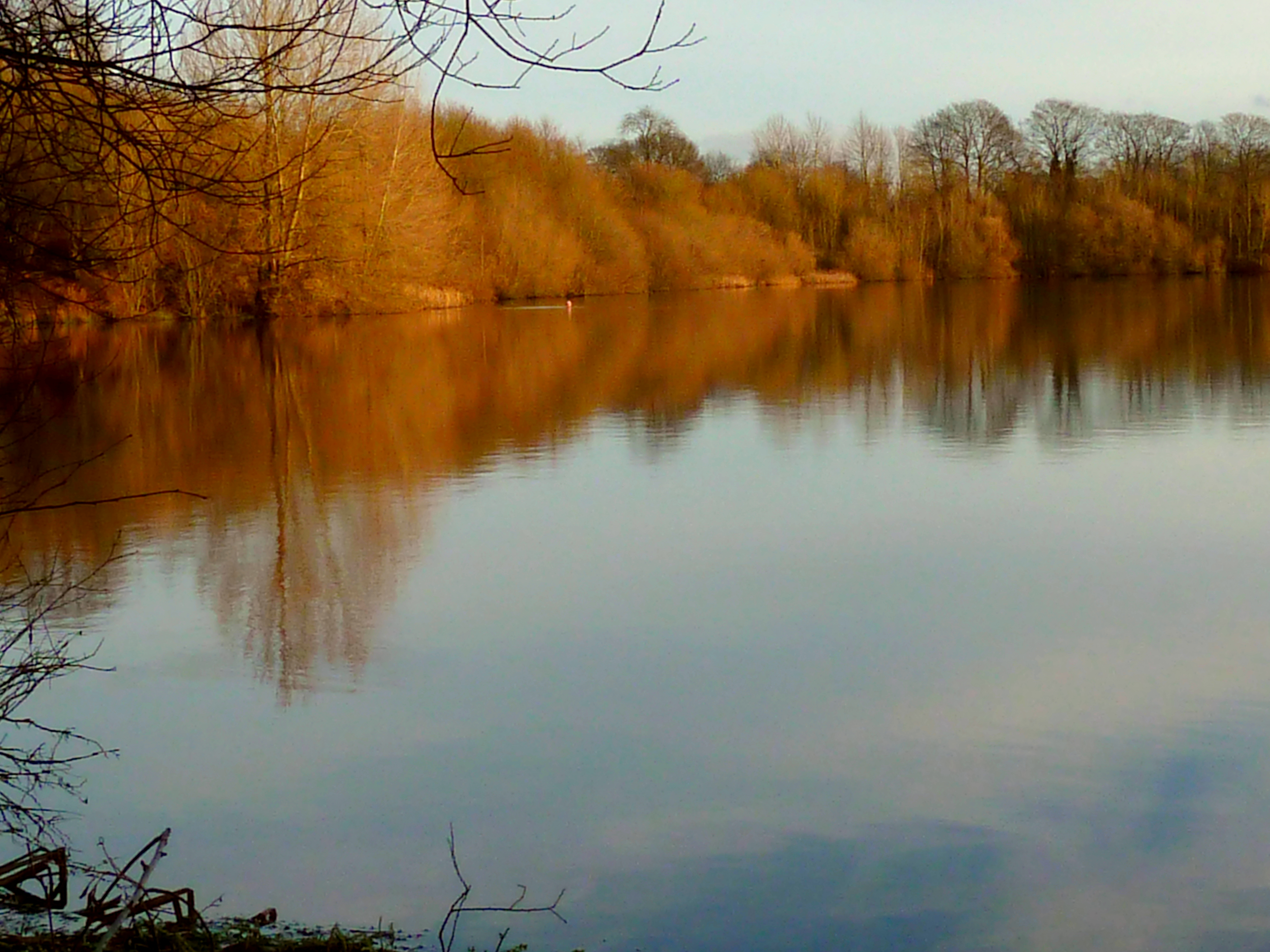
A recreational swimmer strikes out for the centre of the lake, disturbing wintering birds
