= Home Farm House =

Farmhouse in Scriven, North Yorkshire, England

Coordinates: 54°01′14″N 1°28′14″W

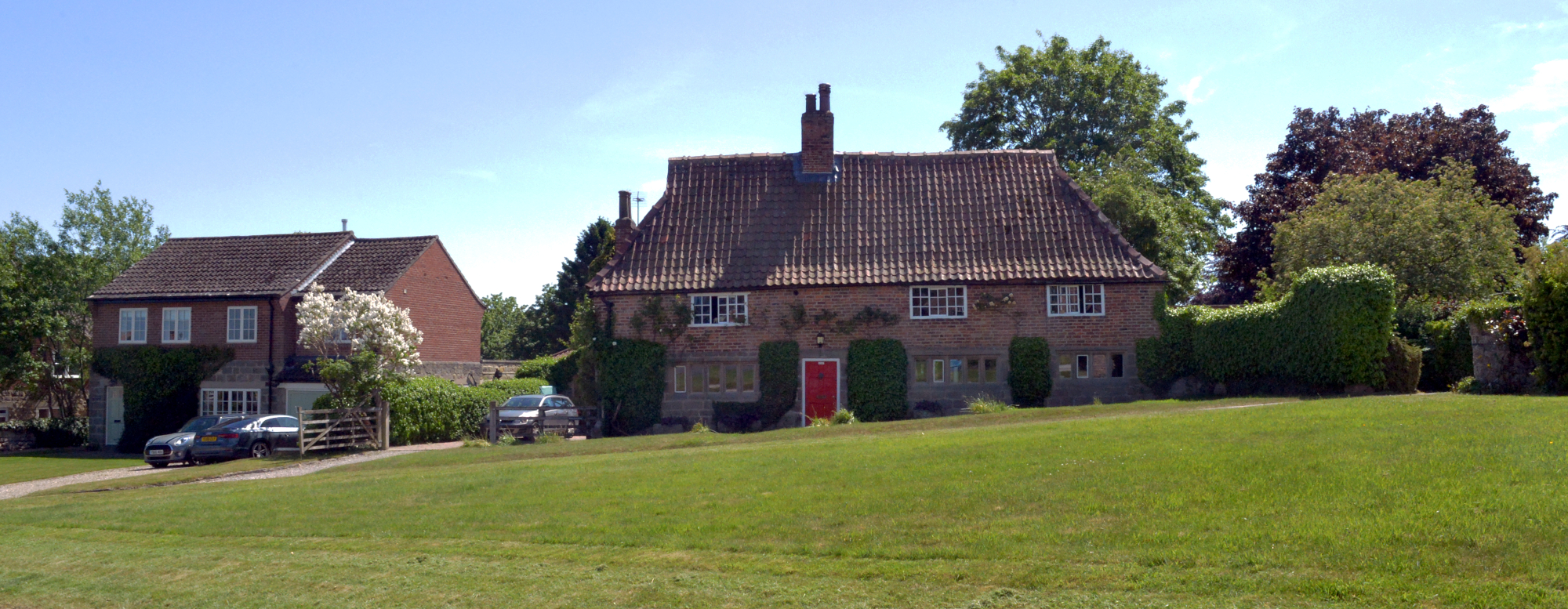
The building, in 2020

Home Farm House is a historic building in Scriven, a village in North Yorkshire, in England.

The timber framed building was perhaps built in about 1500, probably as the main farmhouse of the Slingsby Estate of Scriven Hall. It was a hall house with a rear aisle, in a style common in the Vale of York. It was altered around 1600, when the ground floor was rebuilt in stone, and around 1800 the upper floor was partly encased in brick. By the 1850s, it was serving as the Kings Head Inn. It was sold by Scriven Hall in 1965, and restored, the work including a rear extension and the replacement of many of the rear windows. It has been grade II* listed since 1966.

The ground floor of the house is underbuilt in gritstone, the upper floor is encased in red-orange brick, and it has a hipped pantile roof. It has two storeys and three bays and outshuts. On the front is a doorway, five-light and four-light mullioned windows on the ground floor, and horizontally sliding sash windows on the upper floor. On the left return is exposed close studding. Inside, there is an inglenook fireplace, exposed timber framing and wall paintings dating from about 1600.

== See also ==
- Grade II* listed buildings in North Yorkshire (district)
- Listed buildings in Scriven
