= Oak Beck (Harrogate) =

River in North Yorkshire, England

Oak Beck Oak Brook
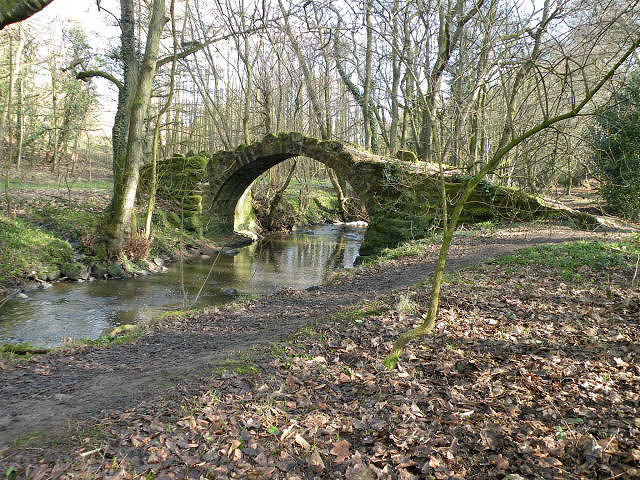
- Irongate Bridge on Oak Beck

- Location of Oak Beck in North Yorkshire

Location
- County: North Yorkshire
- Country: England

Physical characteristics
- Source
  - location: Broad Dubb
  - coordinates: 53.970°N 1.653°W
  - elevation: 700 feet (210 m)
- Mouth
  - location: Bilton
  - coordinates: 54.019°N 1.536°W
- Length: 8.5 miles (13.7 km)

Basin features
- River system: Nidd

Oak Beck is a watercourse that flows eastwards across the northern part of Harrogate in North Yorkshire, England. The beck flows through a broad V-shaped valley, before emptying into the River Nidd at Bilton, just upstream from the Nidd Gorge Viaduct. Water from Oak Beck has been used as a water supply for Harrogate and also for industrial purposes further downstream.

== Course ==
The river rises as a tributary at Broad Dubb in the Haverah Park area west of Harrogate. The site is 700 feet (210 m) above sea level, and water flows eastwards and then northwards as Scargill Beck to fill Scargill Reservoir. Another tributary rises at Bank Hall and flows through the Beaver Dyke Reservoirs as Beaver Dyke. Some 200 yards (180 m) below the lower dam head it meets the waters of Scargill Beck and forms Oak Beck; at this point, the beck is 6 miles (9.7 km) west of Harrogate town centre. The waters of Oak Beck flow through a V-shaped valley covering some 5 square kilometres (1.9 sq mi) west of Harrogate. The river flows through the golf course at Oakdale, providing it with one of its features. Oak Beck divides Jennyfield and Killinghall Moor in the west, with Low Harrogate and the New Park area in the east.

After passing under the A59 and the A61 roads, the river goes past the hamlet of Knox, where it is crossed by the grade II listed Spruisty (or Knox) Bridge, a packhorse bridge that used to have a ford adjacent to it. The bridge was the main route between Knaresborough and Ripley, with the adjacent ford believed to have been the crossing place for monks going to and from Fountains Abbey. The Oak Beck flows past Knox and north of Bilton, entering the River Nidd just upstream of the former railway viaduct across Nidd Gorge. The lower reaches of the river, back from the Nidd past Knox to the northern part of Harrogate, were originally a lake, dammed by a glacier.

The length of the named Oak Beck is 8.5 miles (13.7 km); however, the Environment Agency state it to be 12.01 miles (19.33 km), but this includes the tributaries of Scargill Beck and the stream that flows through Harlow Carr gardens.

== Toponymy ==
One of the settlements passed by the river is Oakdale, a name which can be traced back to the middle of the 13th century when it was written as (forest' de) Ockeden (the forest of oak trees). The river valley used to possess many oak trees, which afforded shelter for sheep and pigs. It has also been referred to as Oak Brook by the judge during a case against Harrogate Commissioners.

== Hydrometry and ecology ==
Four reservoirs have been built on Oak Beck and its tributaries: Beaver Dyke Reservoirs, Scargill Reservoir and Ten Acre Reservoir. Originally, one of the Beaver Dyke reservoirs was known as John O'Gaunt after a local landmark, but both the lower of the Beaver Dyke reservoirs and the Ten Acre Reservoir have been drained of water. The reservoirs were built to provide clean water for Harrogate via the servicing reservoirs at Irongate Bridge and Harlow Hill. The river has a catchment area of 37.611 square kilometres (14.522 sq mi).

A £1.5 million storm drain was installed by the river in 2005. The storm drain, near the swimming pool in the northern part of the town, was built to store run-off water which can be screened before being released into Oak Beck.

Oak Beck was one of a handful of Yorkshire rivers which had a resident population of white-clawed crayfish, and it is also noted to host bullhead and brown trout. A written record from 1904 states an elderly man recalling beavers living on Oak Beck (dated to around 1750), believed to be why the Beaver Dyke and dams acquired their names.

== Industry ==
In the 1860s, pollution in the Oak Beck led to a dispute between a bleaching works owner and the Harrogate Commissioners. The owner of the mill, which was south of the river and Knox hamlet, contended that sewage in the beck was damaging his product, which ironically, in its waste process, produced calcium chloride and calcium hypochlorite, "...both of which have sterilising properties, and so their presence in sewage-polluted water should tend to improve the water quality." Similarly, the Harrogate Gas Company, whose works were adjacent to the beck at the junction of the roads to Ripon and York (now the A59/A61junction), were found to have allowed "deleterious material" to enter the river in early 1890.

There was also a corn mill on Oak Beck, west of the hamlet of Knox. The waterwheel and building were still extant in the 21st century.

Water from the beck was used by at Harrogate power station, which was next to the river as it flowed through its lower reaches in northern Harrogate before entering the Nidd. However, the water that was abstracted was only used in the cooling pond, and not for steam generation.
