= Listed buildings in Scriven =

Scriven is a civil parish in the county of North Yorkshire, England. It contains 14 listed buildings that are recorded in the National Heritage List for England. Of these, one is listed at Grade II*, the middle of the three grades, and the others are at Grade II, the lowest grade. The parish contains the village of Scriven and the surrounding area. All the listed buildings are in the village, and consist of houses, farmhouses and associated structures, an ice house, and a war memorial in the form of a shelter.

== Key ==
Grade	Criteria
II*	Particularly important buildings of more than special interest
II	Buildings of national importance and special interest

== Buildings ==
Name and location	Photograph	Date	Notes	Grade
Home Farm House; 54.02046°N 1.47043°W		Late medieval	The house is timber-framed, the ground floor is underbuilt in gritstone, the upper floor is encased in red-orange brick, it has a hipped pantile roof. There are two storeys and three bays and outshuts. On the front is a doorway, five-light and four-light mullioned windows on the ground floor, and horizontally sliding sash windows on the upper floor. On the left return is exposed close studding. Inside, there is an inglenook fireplace, exposed timber framing and wall painting.	II*
Oak View and wall 54.02109°N 1.47012°W		16th century	The house has a timber-framed core, it is encased in light red brick, with the left return in sandstone and gritstone, and it has a tile roof. There are two storeys and four bays. The doorway has a segmental arch, and the windows are horizontally sliding sashes, those on the ground floor with segmental arches. In front is a garden wall with rounded coping.	II
Park Corner; 54.02024°N 1.46912°W	—	16th century	A farmhouse that has been extended, with a timber-framed core encased in stone. It is in two parts, the left part with two storeys and one bay. It has a pantile roof, and contains a doorway and a sash window in each floor. The other part to the right is lower, with one storey and an attic and two bays. It has a tile roof and contains small-pane windows and two dormers.	II
Corner Cottage, and 1 and 2 Village Terrace; 54.02053°N 1.46947°W	—	17th century	A house, later divided, in red-brown brick, with stone eaves courses and pantile roofs. Each part has two storeys and three bays. Corner Cottage has a central gabled porch and small-pane windows, and at the rear are dentiled eaves. The other part, at the rear, has a dentilled cornice, and contains a doorway and modern windows.	II
Scriven Hall; 54.02094°N 1.47484°W	—	1682	The stables and coach house of the original Scriven Hall, later converted into a house, it is in gritstone on a plinth, with quoins, a moulded string course, a moulded eaves cornice and a hipped stone slate roof. There are two storeys and seven bays. The central round-arched doorway has a chamfered surround, imposts and a keystone, all in a raised panel, and above is a broken segmental pediment and a shield. The windows have two lights, chamfered mullions and raised quoined jambs. At the rear is a doorway with a pointed arch with a chamfered surround, and above it is a coat of arms. Over this is a bellcote with a clock and a weathervane.	II
Rose Cottage; 54.02067°N 1.47073°W	—	Early 18th century	The house is in gritstone, with quoins and a pantile roof with a stone slate eaves course. There are two storeys and three bays. On the front is a doorway, and the windows are small-paned horizontally sliding sashes, those on the upper floor with lintels and keystones, and the remains of quoined jambs. Inside, there is a large brick inglenook fireplace.	II
Wheelwright Cottage; 54.02097°N 1.47086°W	—	Early to mid-18th century	The house is in gritstone and limestone, with quoins, and a pantile roof with three eaves courses of stone. There are two storeys and two bays. In the centre is a doorway, and the windows are sashes, those on the upper floor horizontally sliding, and the ground floor windows have architraves.	II
Pear Tree Cottage; 54.02112°N 1.46990°W		Mid to late 18th century	The house is in pink gritstone, with quoins and a pantile roof. There are three storeys, three bays, and a two-bay rear wing. On the front is a doorway, and the windows are small-paned horizontally sliding sashes.	II
Former dog kennels and yard wall 54.02391°N 1.47329°W		Late 18th century	The former kennels are in pink gritstone and have a pantile roof with an eaves course of stone slate. There is a single storey and four bays, and at the rear is a two-storey bay. Each bay contains a pointed arch with a chamfered surround and imposts. The yard wall is about 2.5 metres (8 ft 2 in) in height, and contains a doorway with a large lintel and chamfered copings.	II
Ice house 54.02303°N 1.47445°W	—	Late 18th century	The ice house is in brick with stone dressings. It has a stone entrance arch leading to a stone-walled passage with a brick barrel vault. The main chamber is circular with brick-lined walls and a dome.	II
Oak Lea; 54.02037°N 1.46981°W	—	c. 1800	The house is in gritstone and has a pantile roof with an eaves course of stone slate. There are two storeys, two bays, and a lower two-storey bay to the right. The doorway is in the centre, the windows have two or three lights, and all the openings have flat arches of voussoirs.	II
Spinney Croft; 54.02030°N 1.46952°W	—	c. 1800	The house is in gritstone, with quoins, and a stone slate roof with a stone slate eaves course, shaped kneelers and gable copings. There are two storeys, three bays, and a single-storey outshut on the right. The central doorway has a plain surround, the windows are casements, and all the openings have flat arches of voussoirs.	II
Roundells Manor; 54.02073°N 1.46946°W		19th century	The house incorporates 16th-century fragments of masonry and 17th-century walling. It is in limestone and gritstone, partly rendered, with some red brick, quoins, and a pantile roof. There are two parallel gabled ranges with two storeys, and each with two bays. The windows are sash windows, some horizontally sliding. Between the upper floor windows is a stone plaque with a shield in relief and an inscription.	II
War memorial 54.02086°N 1.46950°W		1953	The war memorial is in the form of a shelter in stone thought to be from the original Scrivens Hall, and it was also built to commemorate the Coronation of Elizabeth II. It is in limestone with a stone slate roof. The gabled end faces The Green, and has a round-arched doorway with a projecting surround of rusticated quoins and voussoirs containing iron gates, and above it is an inscribed stone plaque. Inside, is a stone plaque with the names of those lost in the two World Wars.	II
