= Forest of Knaresborough =

Coordinates: 53°59′N 1°38′W

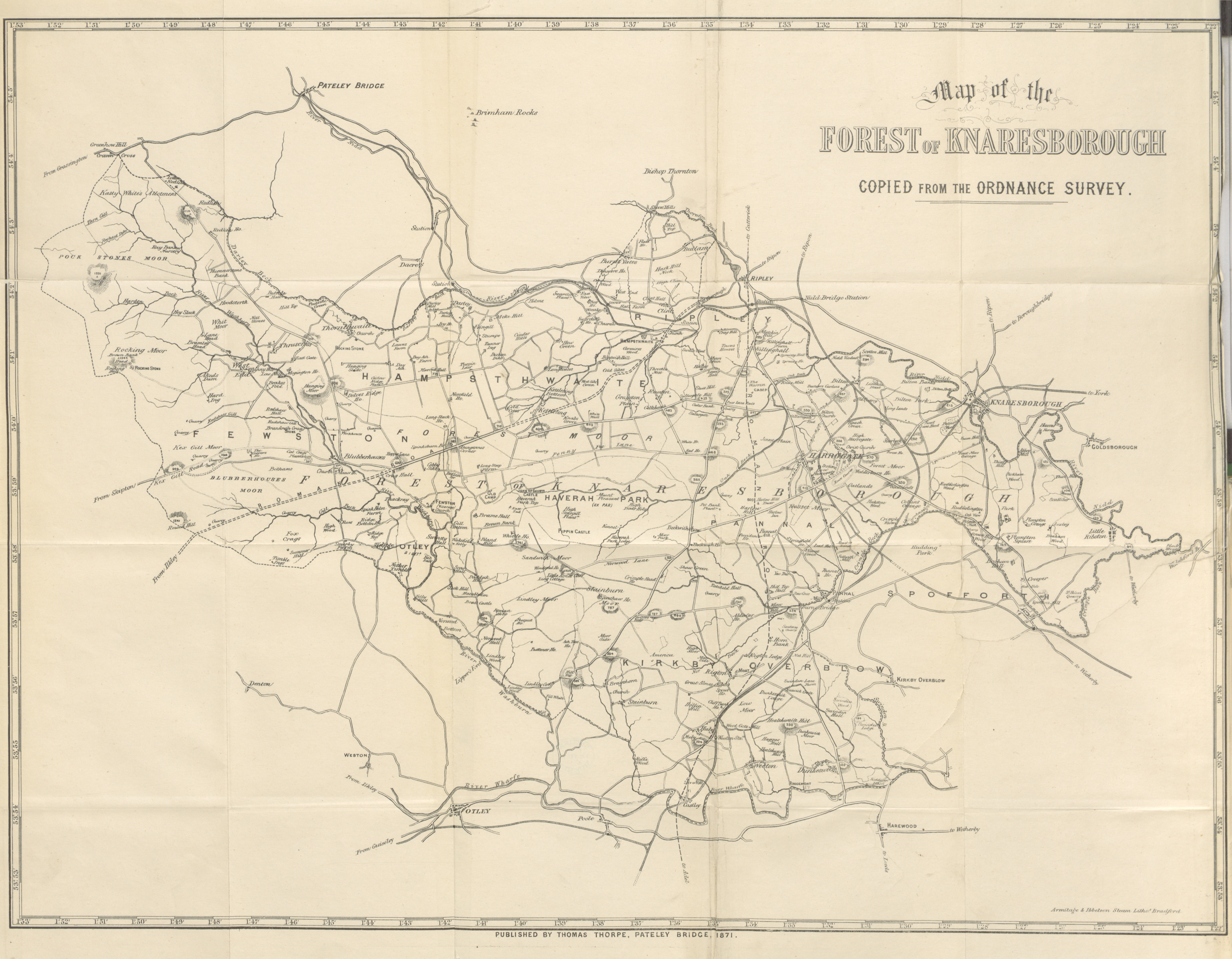
Map of the Forest of Knaresborough

The Forest of Knaresborough was a royal hunting forest in Yorkshire, England. It covered an area of some 45 square miles (120 km^{2}) west and south of the town of Knaresborough, between the River Nidd and the River Wharfe, then in the West Riding of Yorkshire and now in North Yorkshire.

== Origins ==
The earliest surviving reference to the Forest was in 1167, during the reign of Henry II, and it was probably created in the 12th century. Its formation has been linked to Hugh de Moreville, Constable of the Castle and Liberty of Knaresborough, or to William de Stutville, Governor of Knaresborough Castle from 1177 to 1203. The Liberty of Knaresborough lay outside the Forest north of the River Nidd, and it seems that freemen of the Liberty had no rights of pasture in the Forest.

The Forest was a particular favourite of Henry II and King John. Edward III settled the Honour of Knaresborough (which included the Castle and Liberty of Knaresborough as well as the Forest) on his wife Philippa. When she died in 1369, Edward granted the Honour to his son John of Gaunt, Duke of Lancaster. The Honour has remained in the ownership of the Duchy of Lancaster to the present day.

== Administration ==
The Forest was not a continuous stretch of woodland, but a hunting area subject to special rules for conserving game. Its inhabitants lived in villages and hamlets surrounded by meadows and arable land. The Forest was at first divided into three "constabularies": Thruscross, which included the hamlets of Bramley, Darley, Hill, Holme, Menwith, Padside and Thornthwaite; Clint, with the five hamlets of Birstwith, Fearnhill, Felliscliffe, Hampsthwaite and Rowden; and Killinghall, with the hamlets of Beckwith, Rossett and Bilton-with-Harrogate. The hamlets later became eleven separate constabularies: Beckwith with Rossett, Bilton-with-Harrogate, Birstwith, Clifton, Clint, Felliscliffe, Hampsthwaite, Killinghall, Menwith with Darley, Thruscross and Timble.

Within the forest there were two areas, Haverah Park and Bilton Park, which were fenced off as deer parks, allowing game to enter but not to escape. The remains of a hunting lodge, known as John O'Gaunt's Castle, can still be seen in Haverah Park. In 1380 John of Gaunt ordered the building of a hunting lodge in Bilton Park: the building, remodelled in the 19th century, is now known as Bilton Hall.

The inhabitants of the Royal Forest were subject to a body of law which forbade hunting of deer and hunting with bows and arrows or hounds, and provided for fines for cutting down trees. They were in effect tenants of the Crown, but they had security of tenure and could transfer their rights. Provided that they did not interfere with the king's hunting, they were free to make their livings in the Forest. Economic activity included farming, milling and other industries such as mining. There are records of iron forging from 1206, but the industry declined in the 14th century because the wood which supplied the forges was used up.

== Decline ==
Forest of Knaresborough Inclosure Act 1770
- Act of Parliament
- Parliament of Great Britain
- Long title: An Act for dividing and enclosing such of the Open Parts of the District called The Forest of Knaresborough, in the County of York, as lie within the Eleven Constableries there of; and for other Purposes therein mentioned.
- Citation: 10 Geo. 3. c. 94 Pr.
- Territorial extent: Great Britain

Dates
- Royal assent: 19 May 1770
- Commencement: 9 January 1770 (Note: Start of session.)
- Repealed: 16 October 1985
Other legislation
| Amended by | Forest of Knaresborough Inclosure Act 1789 |
| Repealed by | Harrogate Stray Act 1985 |

Status: Repealed

By Tudor times the forest had outlived its original purpose, and English monarchs no longer spent their time hunting. The forest had been stripped of many of its trees, largely for the sale of timber for the iron smelting industry. A survey in 1604 found only 410 standing trees left in Haverah Park. James I was interested in sport and discouraged disafforestation, but his son Charles I did not. In 1628 Charles I sold off both Bilton Park and Haverah Park. The town of Harrogate grew within the forest in the 17th and 18th centuries. In 1770 an inclosure act, the Forest of Knaresborough Inclosure Act 1770 (10 Geo. 3. c. 94 Pr.), divided the forest. Some of the forest remained in the hands of the duchy, some was allocated to tithe owners, and an area of Harrogate was allocated as a public open space known as The Stray.

The visible remains of the forest include a large number of boundary stones erected during the last perambulation of the boundaries conducted in 1767.

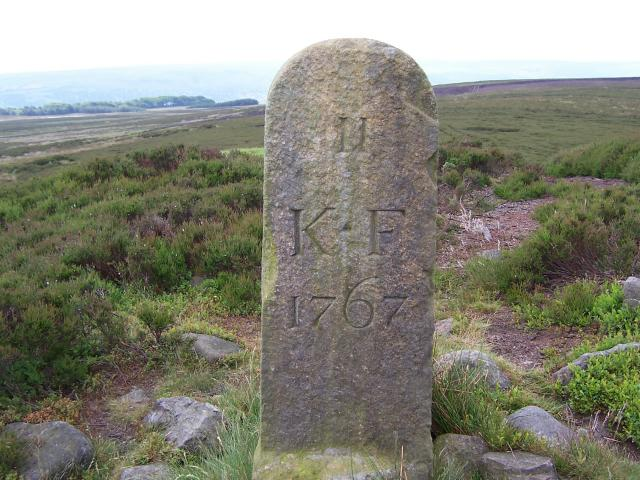
Boundary Stone
