= Oak Beck =

Oak Beck may refer to:

- Oak Beck (Cumbria), a tributary of the Hoff Beck and River Eden in Cumbria, England, UK
- Oak Beck (Harrogate), a tributary of the River Nidd in Harrogate, North Yorkshire, England, UK
