= Jacob Smith Park =

Park in North Yorkshire

Coordinates: 54.018°N 1.471°W

Jacob Smith Park is a park owned by North Yorkshire Council in the outskirts of Knaresborough, North Yorkshire, England.

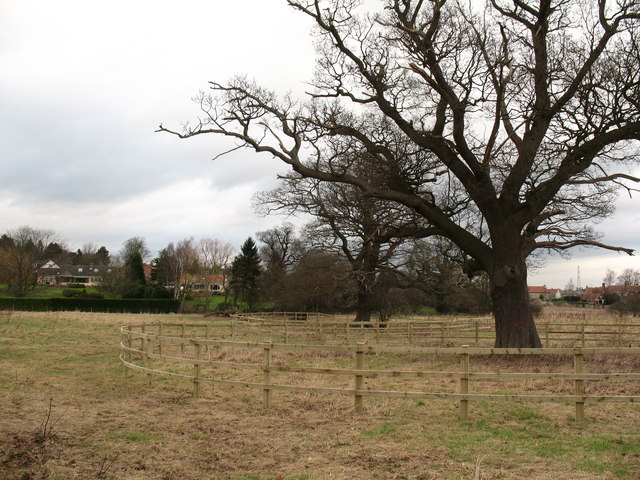
One of the fenced off trees in Jacob Smith Park

It is located in Scriven, and was opened in 2008.
