= Harrogate power station =

- Country: England
- Location: Harrogate
- Coordinates: 54°00′03″N 01°33′17″W
- Status: Decommissioned
- Commission date: 1897
- Decommission date: 1960
- Owners: Harrogate Corporation (1897–1948), British Electricity Authority (1948–55), Central Electricity Authority (1955–57), Central Electricity Generating Board (1958–60)
- Operators: Harrogate Corporation (1897–1948), British Electricity Authority (1948–55), Central Electricity Authority (1955–57), Central Electricity Generating Board (1958–60)

Thermal power station
- Primary fuel: Coal
- Secondary fuel: Diesel oil
- Turbine technology: Reciprocating engines and steam turbines
- Cooling source: Spray cooling pond

Power generation
- Nameplate capacity: 15.875 MW
- Annual net output: 9501 MWh (1946)

Harrogate power station supplied electricity to the town of Harrogate and the surrounding area from 1897 to 1960. The power station was built by the Harrogate Corporation which operated it until the nationalisation of the British electricity supply industry in 1948.

== History ==
The Harrogate Corporation applied for a Provisional Order under the Electric Lighting Acts to generate and supply electricity to the town of Harrogate. The Harrogate Electric Lighting Order 1891 was granted by the Board of Trade and was confirmed by Parliament through the Electric Lighting Orders Confirmation (No. 1) Act 1891 (54 & 55 Vict. c. xlix).

The power station was built north of the town off Ripon Road Harrogate (54°00′03″N 01°33′17″W); it began to supply electricity on 14 April 1897. The site was adjacent to the Oak Beck which provided make-up water to the station's spray cooling pond.

The Central Electricity Board built the first stages of the National Grid between 1927 and 1933. Harrogate power station were connected to the 132 kV electricity grid. In 1935 Ripon ceded its electricity supply rights to the Harrogate electricity undertaking.

The British electricity supply industry was nationalised in 1948 under the provisions of the Electricity Act 1947 (10 & 11 Geo. 6. c. 54). The Harrogate electricity undertaking was abolished, ownership of Harrogate power station was vested in the British Electricity Authority, and subsequently the Central Electricity Authority and the Central Electricity Generating Board (CEGB). At the same time the electricity distribution and sales responsibilities of the Harrogate undertaking were transferred to the North Eastern Electricity Board (NEEB).

Following nationalisation Harrogate power station became part of the Harrogate electricity supply district, covering an area of 192,084 acres (77,734 ha).

Harrogate power station was closed in 1960.

== Equipment specification ==
=== Plant in 1898 ===
The plant in 1898 comprised Belliss and McLaren engines coupled directly to Ferranti and Siemens alternators. The capacity of the generating plant was 575 kW and the maximum load was 156 kW.

=== Plant in 1923 ===
By 1923 the plant at Harrogate comprised boilers delivering a total of 50,000 lb/h (6.3 kg/s) of steam to:

- 1 × 300 kW turbo-alternator generating alternating current (AC)
- 1 × 1,000 kW turbo-alternator generating AC
- 1 × 1,200 kW turbo-alternator generating AC
- 1 × 1,250 kW turbo-alternator generating AC

In addition there was one 400 kW oil-fired engine driven alternator generating AC

The total generating capacity was 4,150 kW.

=== Plant in 1954 ===
By 1954 the plant comprised:

- Boilers:
  - 2 × Holdsworth 12,000 lb/hr (1.51 kg/s), steam conditions were 180 psi at 600 °F (12.4 bar and 316 °C)
  - 2 × Yarrow 50,000 lb/h (6.3 kg/s), steam conditions were 300 psi and 700 °F (20.7 bar and 371 °C), steam was supplied to:
- Generators (turbo-alternators):
  - 1 × 1.875 MW Brush
  - 1 × 4.5 MW F & C, 3.66 kV
  - 1 × 8.0 MW Parsons, 11 kV
  - 1 × 1.5 MW F & C, 3.46 kV

The total installed generating capacity was 15.875 MW.

Water cooling was by spray coolers and pond, the circulation capacity was 0.95 million gallons per hour (1.2 m^{3}/s).

== Operations ==
=== Operating data 1921–23 ===
The electricity supply data for the period 1921–23 was:

Harrogate power station supply data 1921–23
Electricity Use	Units	Year		
Electricity Use	Units	1921	1922	1923
Lighting and domestic	MWh	1,781	1,954	2,419
Public lighting	MWh	95	95	107
Traction	MWh	0	0	0
Power	MWh	482	498	473
Bulk supply	MWh	0	0	0
Total use	MWh	2,359	2,547	2,999

Electricity Loads on the system were:

Year		1921	1922	1923
Maximum load	kW	1,596	1,760	1,785
Total connections	kW	5,580	6,057	6,782
Load factor	Per cent	22.5	22.2	24.0

Revenue from the sale of current (in 1923) was £52,102; the surplus of revenue over expenses was £29,420.

=== Operating data 1946 ===
In 1946 Harrogate power station supplied 9,501 MWh of electricity; the maximum output load was 9,076 kW.

=== Operating data 1954–60 ===
Operating data for the period 1954–58 was:

Harrogate power station operating data, 1954–58
Year	Running hours,	Max output capacity MW	Electricity supplied MWh	Thermal efficiency per cent
1954	596	8	2,816	12.42
1955	1008	8	4,887	13.18
1956	718	8	3,454	14.06
1957	693	8	3,047	13.45
1958	941	8	4,262	13.98

== Harrogate Electricity District ==
Following nationalisation in 1948 Harrogate power station became part of the Harrogate electricity supply district, covering 192,084 acres (77,734 ha). The number of consumers and electricity sold in the Harrogate district was:

Year	1956	1957	1958
Number of consumers	31,093	32,669	33,475
Electricity sold MWh	88,589	95,433	104,690

In 1958 the number of units sold to categories of consumers was:

Type of consumer	No. of consumers	Electricity sold MWh
Residential	27,459	60,868
Commercial	4,017	21,939
Industrial	465	14,262
Farms	1,508	6.388
Traction	0	0
Public lighting	26	1,133
Total	33,475	104,690

== See also ==
- Timeline of the UK electricity supply industry
- List of power stations in England
