= Haverah Park =

Civil parish in North Yorkshire, England

Coordinates: 53°59′N 1°38′W

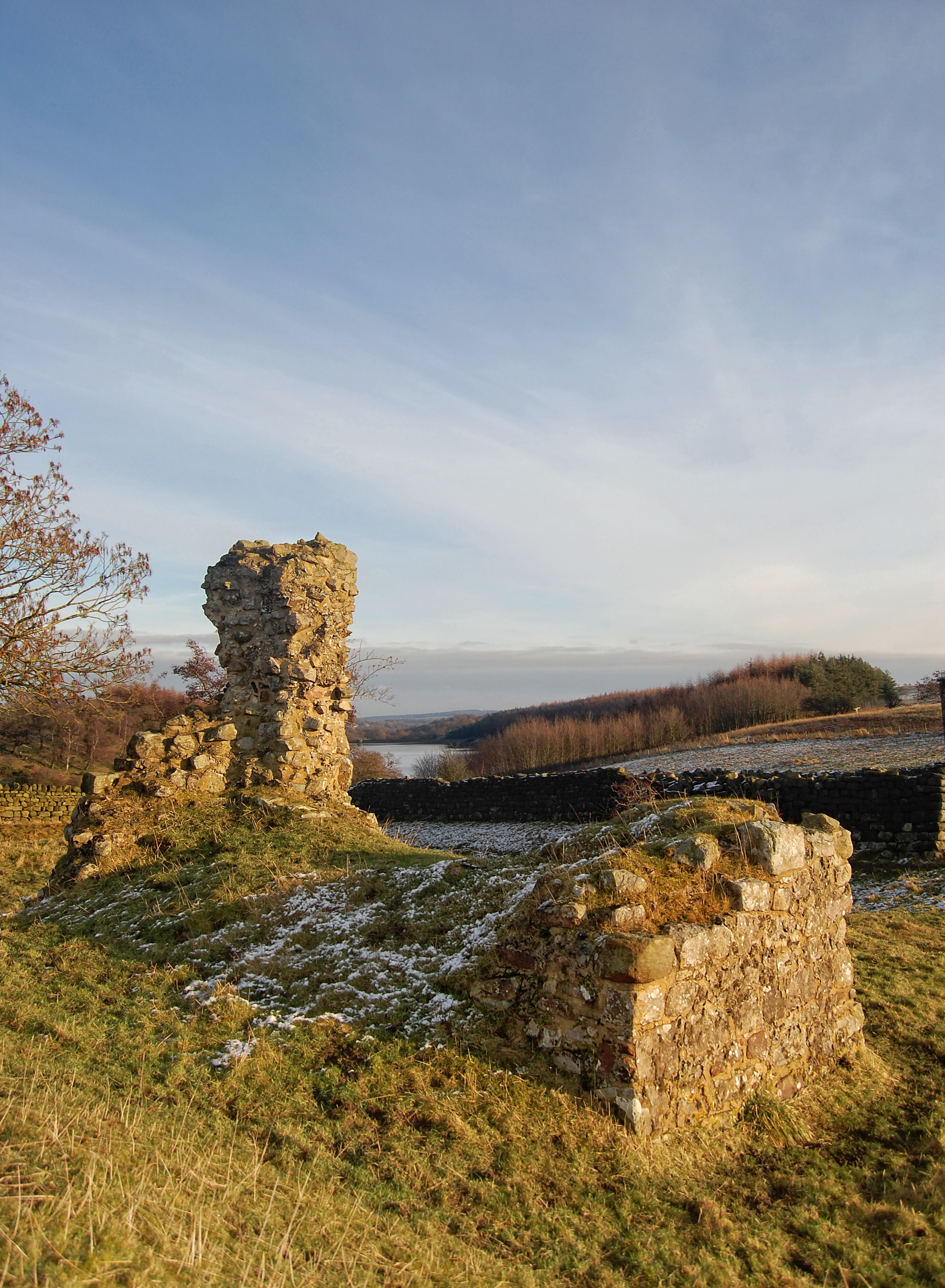
- Remains of John O'Gaunt's Castle

- Location within North Yorkshire
- Population: 30
- Civil parish: Haverah Park
- Unitary authority: North Yorkshire
- Ceremonial county: North Yorkshire
- Region: Yorkshire and the Humber
- Country: England
- Sovereign state: United Kingdom
- Police: North Yorkshire
- Fire: North Yorkshire
- Ambulance: Yorkshire

Haverah Park is a civil parish in North Yorkshire, England. It is located 3 miles (5 km) west of Harrogate.

The parish consists of several scattered farms. There is no village in the parish, and there are no public roads. Access is by private roads or by public footpaths. The population is estimated at only 30. The parish shares a grouped parish council with Beckwithshaw.

There are several small reservoirs in the parish: Beaver Dyke Reservoirs, Scargill Reservoir and Ten Acre Reservoir. The remains of John O'Gaunt's Castle lie in the far west of the parish.

== History ==
The name is a compound of the Old English (ge)hæg, meaning "hunting enclosure", and Old Norse vrá, meaning "corner of land".

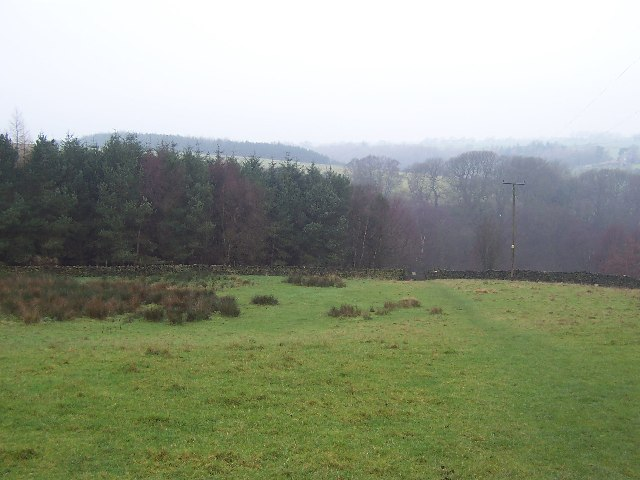
Lower Scargill Plantation

Haverah Park was created in the late 12th century as a royal deer park within the Forest of Knaresborough. The park later became the property of the Ingleby family of Ripley Castle.

The park was an extra parochial area until 1858, when it became a civil parish.

Between 1967 and 1987 the University of Leeds operated a cosmic ray detection array in the park, known as the Haverah Park experiment.

Until 1974 it was in the West Riding of Yorkshire. From 1974 to 2023 it was in Harrogate district.
