= Beaver Dyke Reservoirs =

Reservoirs in North Yorkshire, England

- Lower Beaver Dyke Reservoir; John O'Gaunts Reservoir
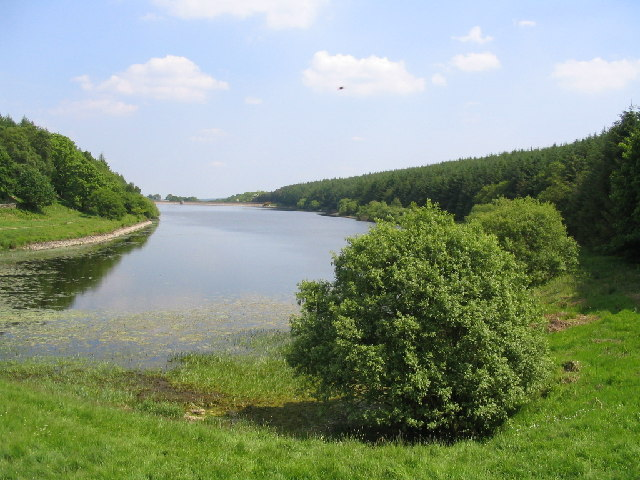
- Lower Beaver Dyke reservoir (2005, before decommissioning)

- Location within North Yorkshire Location within the United Kingdom
- Location: Harrogate, North Yorkshire, England
- Coordinates: 53.9864°N 1.6614°W
- Type: Reservoirs
- Primary inflows: Oak Beck
- Built: 1890
- Surface area: 9 ha (22 acres)

Beaver Dyke Reservoirs were two water supply reservoirs (one of which is still extant), 5 miles (8 km) west of Harrogate in North Yorkshire, England. The main reservoir, also known as Lower Beaver Dyke Reservoir, was constructed in 1890 and had a surface area of 9 ha (22 acres). In 2008 the reservoir's owner, Yorkshire Water, decided that it was not economic to maintain its ageing structures. It was decommissioned between 2013 and 2015 by breaching its dam and channelling a stream in the bed of the former reservoir. A residual lake of 0.5 ha (1.2 acres) was retained. The water of the reservoir was relatively nutrient rich, but it was known to suffer from potentially toxic blooms of Cyanobacteria.

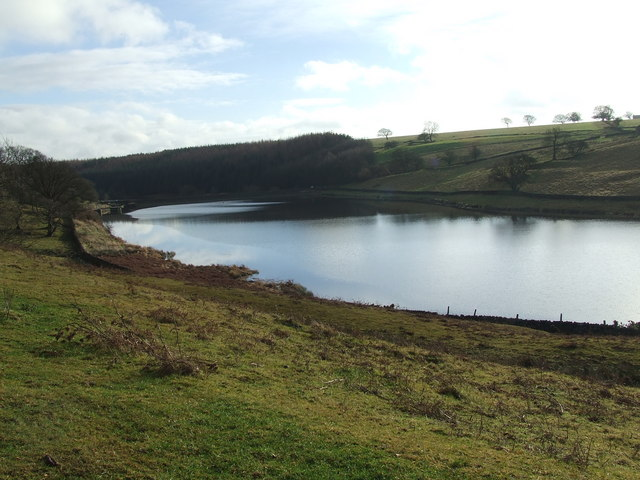
John O'Gaunt's reservoir (2007)

The smaller reservoir (also called John O'Gaunts Reservoir due to the proximity of John O'Gaunt's Castle) is still filled with water.
