= Scriven =

Village and civil parish in North Yorkshire, England

Coordinates: 54°01′15″N 1°28′12″W

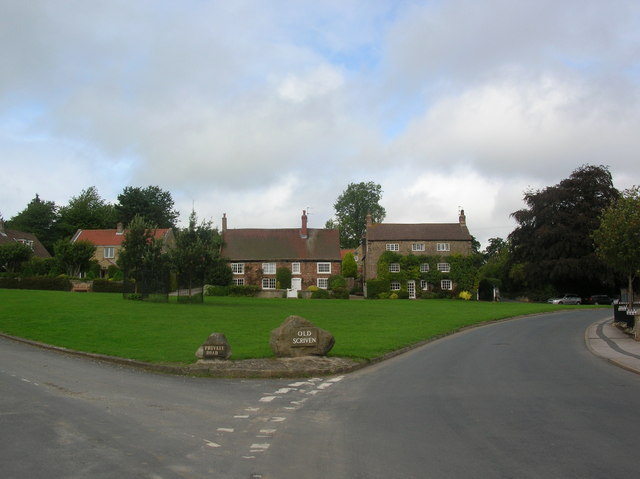
- The village green in Scriven

- Location within North Yorkshire
- Population: 233 (2011)
- OS grid reference: SE349585
- Civil parish: Scriven
- Unitary authority: North Yorkshire
- Ceremonial county: North Yorkshire
- Region: Yorkshire and the Humber
- Country: England
- Sovereign state: United Kingdom
- Post town: KNARESBOROUGH
- Postcode district: HG5
- Police: North Yorkshire
- Fire: North Yorkshire
- Ambulance: Yorkshire

Scriven is a village and civil parish in the county of North Yorkshire, England, close to the town of Knaresborough. From 1947 to 1998 Scriven was part of the Claro Registration District, until this was abolished. It is situated north-west of the A6055 road from Bond End and situated north-east of the B6165 Ripley Road.

Scriven-with-Tentergate was a parish however in modern days it is now known as Scriven due to a boundary change. The name Scriven originally meant "Hollow-place" with pits and could have referred to the quarrying that occurred nearby. Tentergate however contains the derivative "gate", which is the Scandinavian translation for street, and was the place where cloth was stretched for drying.

Until 1974 it was part of the West Riding of Yorkshire. From 1974 to 2023 it was part of the Borough of Harrogate, it is now administered by the unitary North Yorkshire Council.

== Early history ==
Scriven was included in 1066 and 1086 in the Domesday Book. In 1066 the Lord was King Edward and the value to the Lord was £6. In 1086 however, the Lord was King William and the value decreased to just £1. There were 26 ploughlands, which was land available for growing crops and the taxable value was 44.9 geld units. Scriven was one of eleven berewicks in 1086 of the Knaresborough manor and remains close to the town. Due to the close proximity and deep history between the two, there are no churches in Scriven, village residents travelled (and still do) to churches in the town to worship.

In the 1870s, Scriven was described as:

SCRIVEN-WITH-TENTERGATE, a township in Knaresborough parish, W. R. Yorkshire; on the river Nidd, 1 mile N by W of Knaresborough. Acres, 1, 767. Real property, £5, 901; of which £40 are in gas-works. Pop., 1, 426. Houses, 353. The manor belonged anciently to the Scrivens; passed, in the time of Henry III., to the Slingsbys; and, with S. Hall, belongs now to SirSlingsby, Bart. Conyngarth Saxon camp and Gates-hill Danish camp are near the Hall.

=== Occupation structure ===
The pie chart below shows the occupational structure of Scriven in 1881. Historically Scriven's history was primarily agriculture which can be seen from the pie chart. Although majority of the occupations remain unknown, the data does show that of the known occupations vast were involved in the agricultural industry. However, if we compare this data with information from the 2011 Census data it can be seen that no-one in Scriven is involved in the agricultural industry. As society changed throughout time there became a shift in industry with most economically active residents in Scriven working in the wholesale and retail trade.

Pie Chart showing the occupational structure of Scriven in 1881

== Population ==
According to the 2011 census it had a population of 233. Due to the change in parish boundary, from Scriven with Tentergate to Scriven on 31 December 1894, the population also reflects this and there seems to be a sudden decrease. It is difficult to account for these population changes as the figures do fluctuate. The 2011 figures are very similar to the 1901 figures despite being 110 years difference. However, there are limitations to the population graph due to lack of historical data.

Population of Scriven 1881–2011

The graph supports the fact that there was the boundary change in 1894 resulting in Tentergate becoming a new civil parish. When the 1901 census was taken it showed how the population had decreased drastically from 615 in 1891 to 273, because of the change in boundaries.

== Modern Scriven ==
In 2006, after Winifred Jacob Smith, a North Yorkshire resident, died she left what is known now as Jacob Smith Park, 30 acres of land which was turned into a public park. In 2012 Scriven made the news again, after a 200-year-old oak tree in Jacob Smith Park had fallen revealing a nest of 6,000 honeybees.

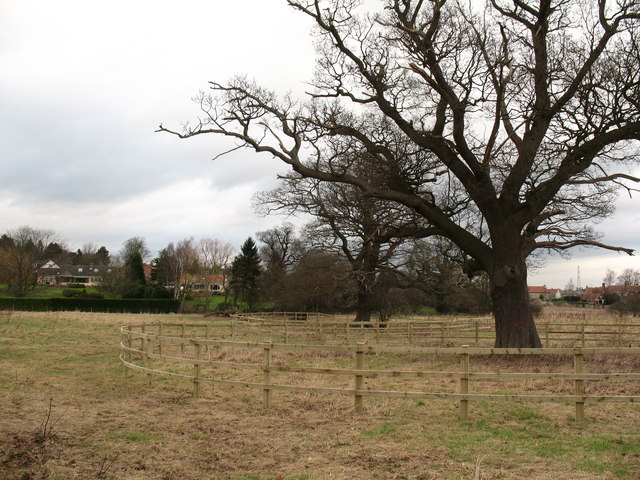
Jacob Smith Park

=== Education ===
There are no schools in the area. The nearest primary school is St Mary's Catholic School in Knaresborough which is 0.7 miles away. The nearest secondary school is The Forest School which is a Special school and is 1.1 miles away.

=== Places of interest ===
There are 14 listed buildings in Scriven. 13 are at grade II and the other is at grade II*.

Home Farmhouse, The Green: A grade II* listed building due to its special architectural and historical interest which was first listed in 1966. Originally a house in late medieval times which was then restored, after alterations, in 1965–70.

Scriven Hall is a grade II listed building, formerly known as 'The Coach House' which in 1966 was converted into a normal house. The Hall was created to house Sir Thomas Slingsby, 2nd Baronet and his family. In 1954 there was a fire causing the Hall to be demolished. The estate was later sold on in 1965 and was converted.

== Geography and climate ==
=== Geology ===
The area is mostly built on superficial deposits such as Diamiction. The bedrock contains mostly Sandstone however there are compositions of Limestone.

=== Climate ===
The table below shows the climate data for Scriven, collected from Knaresborough.

Climate data for Knaresborough closest available data source to Scriven
Month	Jan	Feb	Mar	Apr	May	Jun	Jul	Aug	Sep	Oct	Nov	Dec	Year
Record high °C (°F)	15 (59)	16 (61)	18 (64)	24 (75)	27 (81)	31 (88)	31 (88)	31 (88)	27 (81)	24 (75)	18 (64)	15 (59)	31 (88)
Mean daily maximum °C (°F)	7 (45)	8 (46)	10 (50)	13 (55)	16 (61)	19 (66)	21 (70)	21 (70)	18 (64)	14 (57)	10 (50)	7 (45)	14 (57)
Record low °C (°F)	−8 (18)	−8 (18)	−7 (19)	−4 (25)	−2 (28)	2 (36)	4 (39)	4 (39)	1 (34)	−4 (25)	−9 (16)	−8 (18)	−9 (16)
Average precipitation mm (inches)	58 (2.3)	41 (1.6)	37 (1.5)	56 (2.2)	49 (1.9)	55 (2.2)	54 (2.1)	66 (2.6)	61 (2.4)	66 (2.6)	58 (2.3)	53 (2.1)	654 (25.8)
Average precipitation days	16	14	15	13	13	14	14	12	15	16	16	11	169
Average snowy days	3	3	3	1	0	0	0	0	0	0	1	1	12
Average relative humidity (%)	85	81	78	76	74	75	75	76	79	83	86	87	80
Mean daily sunshine hours	3	4	5	7	8	9	7	6	5	5	3	3	5

== The Scriven Project ==
Funded by the Heritage Lottery Fund and supported by the Arts and Museum Department of Harrogate Borough Council the project began in 2008 researching and documenting the local history, archaeology and landscape of the Scriven area and all the findings shout be documented by the end of 2013.
