= Scriven Park =

Country house in North Yorkshire, England

Coordinates: 54.0206°N 1.4755°W

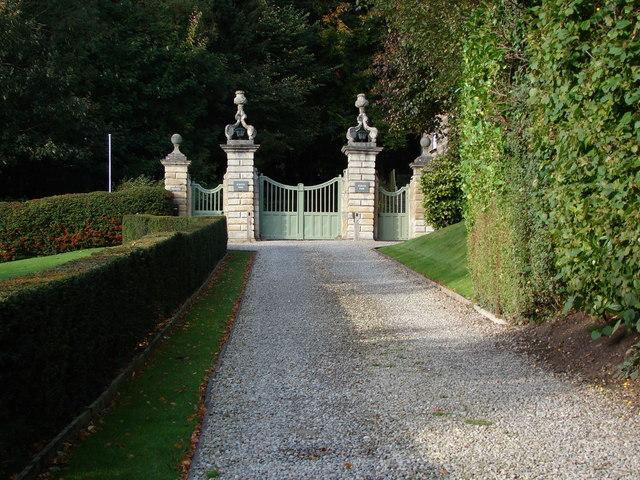
Gates of the former estate

Scriven Park was a historic house and estate in Knaresborough, a town in North Yorkshire, in England.

The estate was the home of the Slingsby family from the 13th century. The house was rebuilt in the early 18th century for Sir Henry Slingsby, 5th Baronet. The new building was designed by William Wakefield in the neoclassical style, with an enclosed portico. The family died out in the late 19th century, the estate was sold and later broken up. It was requisitioned at the start of World War II, but was empty when it was damaged by a fire in the early 1950s. It was demolished in 1954. The gate piers survive, as do the coach house and stables, converted into a house.

The two pairs of gate piers at the entrance to the drive are constructed of rusticated stone. The inner pair are about 4 metres (13 ft) high, and each pier has a moulded plinth and a deep cornice, on which are four S-shaped supports on balls, carrying a swagged orb and a coronet. The outer gate piers are smaller, about 3.5 metres (11 ft) high, and are surmounted by ball finials. They have been grade II* listed since 1966.

The former stables and coach house is now known as Scriven Hall. The building was constructed in 1682 for Thomas Slingsby, and was converted into a house in 1966. It is built of gritstone, with a stone slate roof. It is two storeys high, with the stables being seven bays wide, and the coach house a single bay. The main entrance is on the west side in a round archway, with the shield of the Slingsbys above. The windows are mullioned, with most being 20th century replacements. There is a bellcote with a clock and a weathervane.

== See also ==
- Grade II* listed buildings in North Yorkshire (district)
- Listed buildings in Knaresborough
- Listed buildings in Scriven
