= John O'Gaunt's Castle =

Hunting lodge in North Yorkshire, England

- Haverah Park, England
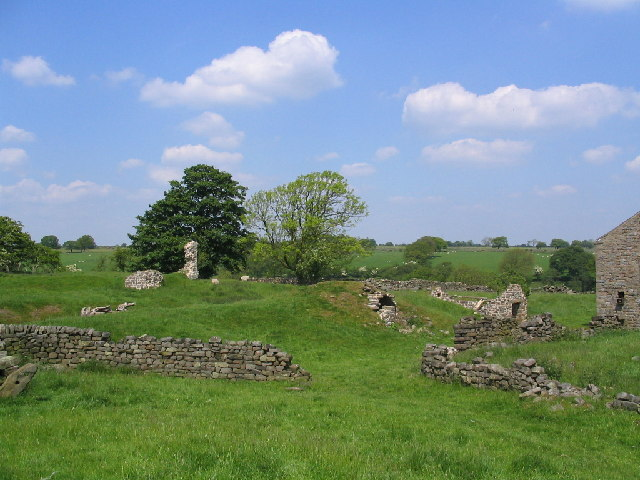
- Castle remains today

Site information
- Type: Hunting lodge

Location
- Shown within North Yorkshire
- Coordinates: 53.9861°N 1.6675°W
- Grid reference: grid reference SE219545

John O'Gaunt's Castle was a royal hunting lodge. It is situated in the civil parish of Haverah Park near Harrogate, now in North Yorkshire (historically in the West Riding of Yorkshire).

== History ==
The castle was considered to be the hunting lodge of John O'Gaunt, Duke of Lancaster, who was Lord of the Manor of Knaresborough for twenty-eight years until 1399.

Strongly sited on the end of a spur at Haverah Park, is a ditched platform 35 metres (115 ft) by 30 metres (98 ft) which had a curtain wall and a gatehouse, with a bridge over the moat. Within are buried footings of a central tower, 15 metres (49 ft) square, and one wall which probably formed part of a range. It was situated within the royal lordship of Knaresborough. Edward III had building works in progress here in 1334. In 1372 he granted it, along with Knaresborough to his son John of Gaunt.

The castle was listed for the first time on 17 December 1929.

== Description ==
The hunting lodge was a stone tower built atop on a square foundation. The lodge also had a chapel. The roof was made out of lead. A 2-metre (6 ft 7 in) wide ditch surrounded the castle.

== See also ==
- Beaver Dyke Reservoirs
- Castles in Great Britain and Ireland
- List of castles in England
