= Hannah Greg =

Wife of British businessman

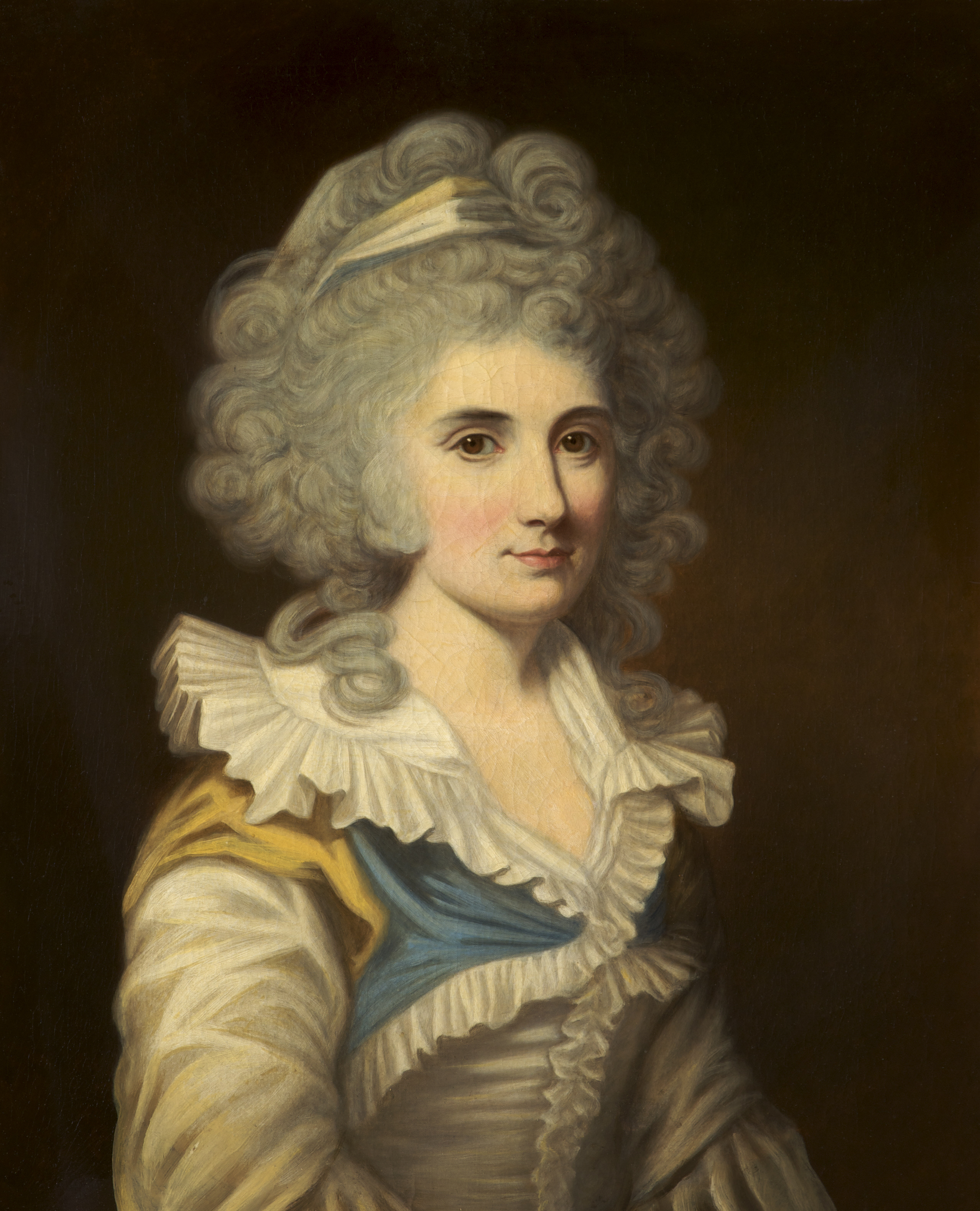
- Born: 1766
- Died: February 4, 1828 (aged 61–62)
- Education: Henry Holland's School
- Spouse: Samuel Greg
- Children: 13 (eleven survived)

Hannah Greg (née Lightbody; 1766 – 1828), with her husband Samuel Greg, was the architect of a paternalistic industrial community in the north of England, a prominent Unitarian and significant diarist. While her husband Samuel Greg pioneered new ways of running a cloth mill, she supervised the housing and conditions of the employees, including the education of the child workers. The Gregs, despite family connections to the slave trade, were considered enlightened employers for the time, and though in the 1830s the apprentice system was questioned, Quarry Bank Mill maintained it until her death.

== Early life and education ==
Lightbody was born in 1766, she was the daughter of a wealthy Unitarian Liverpool merchant, Adam Lightbody (1729–1778), and Elizabeth Tylston (1735–1801), who came from a prominent dissenting family. Elizabeth's grandfather was John Tylston, the "good doctor of Chester", who married a daughter of Philip Henry, the ejected preacher, and thus Elizabeth had moved easily within the London and Warrington dissenting circles. She was a member of the Liverpool Library, England's first subscription library, and the Octonian Society. (The name was explained by Henry Solly as being a discussion group limited to eight members.)

Hannah was the youngest of the three surviving children, all girls. The other three pregnancies had resulted in two still births and one perinatal death. She was eleven, studying in Henry Holland's School in nearby Ormskirk, when her father died, leaving her one-third of his wealth, held in trust until she was 21.

When she was sixteen, her cousin Thomas Rogers invited her to his home in Newington Green, then a village a couple of miles north of the City of London. He had children of a similar age (including Samuel Rogers, later an eminent man of letters), so she could attend Fleetwood House school in Stoke Newington a mile further north (in Dissenting circles it was "a fresh but important aim to educated daughters as well as sons"), and worship with the family at the Unitarian Church on the Green. Thomas Rogers was prominent among the London rational dissenters, and the two neighbouring villages were filled with Quakers and non-conformists, including those who started the Society for Effecting the Abolition of the Slave Trade. The Rogers family lived next door to Richard Price, the well-connected minister, where Mary Wollstonecraft was a visitor. Hannah learnt debating skills and read widely within a critical Unitarian framework.

It was probably during this stay near London that her first portrait was painted, now held in the Quarry Bank Mill archive.

Her connection to Price may later have been the introduction to his radical circle for her sister-in-law. With Roger O'Connor, Jane Greg sought out contacts in support of the cause the United Irishmen.

== Marriage to Samuel Greg ==
Hannah Lightbody returned to Liverpool. Her sisters' husbands Thomas Hodgson and John Pares were investing in a cotton spinning mill in Caton near Lancaster. Pares had gained practical experience on Arkwright's water frames and was challenging the renewal of the patent. A man named Samuel Greg had found a similar site on the River Bollin near Wilmslow and had built a mill at Quarry Bank.

Greg had been born in Belfast in 1758; being known to be Irish was a further hindrance to progression. His father was a ship-owner who had land in the West Indies, and thirteen children to support. He sent two of his sons, Thomas and Samuel, to live with relatives in England; Samuel Greg was adopted at eight years old by his maternal uncle, Robert Hyde, a textile merchant and manufacturer. Samuel started working for the company in 1778, and was a partner by 1782. Robert soon died and his brother Nathaniel retired. At 24, Samuel had a fortune of £26000. He had a loom shop in Eyam, and built Quarry Bank mill to provide a safe source of yarn. Quarry Bank Mill in Styal (built 1784) was profitable and Greg was in need of a wife.

Hannah Lightbody and Samuel Greg married in 1789, and she left Liverpool to make a life in Manchester. In her marital home of 35 King Street, she learned how to manage a household, and was soon entertaining the members of the Manchester Literary and Philosophical Society after their meetings. In 1800 the Gregs moved to Quarry Bank House, next to the mill.

She introduced her husband, a Presbyterian by upbringing, to the Unitarians who attended Cross Street Chapel in Manchester. He accepted her faith. Their non-conformist religious beliefs provided the Gregs with important business contacts, an influential network of Manchester and Liverpool trading and banking families, as many of the major Industrialists were Unitarian.

The Greg family also had mills in Reddish, Calver, Bowlas, Bollington, Lancaster and Caton. In the Escowbeck Estate, in Caton they built their own observatory.

== Quarry Bank estate ==
Samuel had leased the Quarry Bank Mill at Styal, and took a farm nearby as a summer house in the country for the children. By 1800, the family was living next to the factory.

The cotton mill was partly staffed by "parish apprentices", a system with similarities to indentured servitude. It dated back to the Elizabethan Poor Law, and came to be used as a way to care for illegitimate, abandoned, and orphaned children (foundlings). In the early years of the Industrial Revolution, entrepreneurs began to resist the restrictions of the apprenticeship system. Many of the parish apprentices at Styal were selected from the workhouses of Liverpool, London and Newcastle-under-Lyme. The Gregs saw themselves as enlightened employers; in 1831 they employed 351 "free hands" and 100 children, some local and some from urban workhouses.

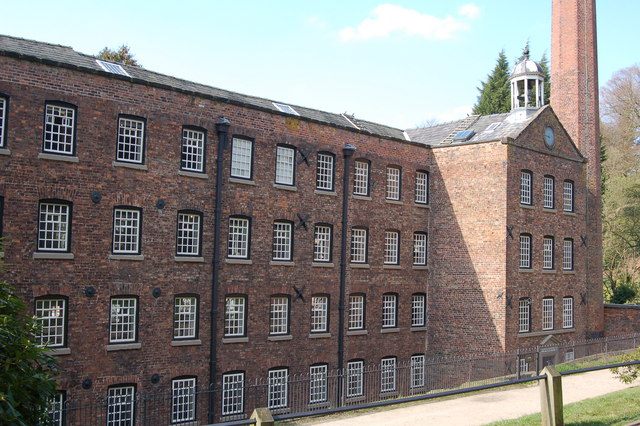
Quarry Bank Mill

When the mill was extended, the Gregs laid out a model village, a precursor to Robert Owen's utopian socialist experiment at New Lanark a decade later. They built workers' cottages for the waged adults and an apprentice house for the indentured children. In developing the community, they built Norcliffe Chapel, which still serves as a Unitarian place of worship.

The children were overseen by Hannah Greg, who delivered the services of a doctor, two teachers and two singing masters; in return, she expected weekly attendance at the Anglican parish church. After the children's thirteen-hour shift, Hannah provided them with lessons in reading, writing and arithmetic. When she was in Styal she delivered the lessons to the girls, and preached to them on Sundays. The Greg children were expected to take part in the teaching, as it was part of her dissenting belief that people should mix together, be frugal and accept their responsibilities to others.

In the 1830s the apprentice system began to be questioned. Hannah died on 4 February 1828 but Quarry Bank maintained the system until 1847.

== Religion and politics ==
Hannah's life was shaped by British Unitarianism, a denomination of English Dissenters who have always valued education for girls as much as for boys. Dissenters suffered under various legal disabilities well into the 19th century, being barred from many professions and public appointments, which meant that their energy often went into trade and business instead. Many became wealthy as factory owners and helped to shape the Industrial Revolution. Another injustice of the time was that, before the Reform Act 1832, Parliament had not changed with the growth and urbanisation of the country. Manchester, one of the greatest economic engines in Britain, had no MPs.

The Lightbody family worshipped under Dr Yates at the Kaye Street Chapel (which moved to Paradise Street, Liverpool in 1791.

Hannah had firm beliefs that men could not progress outside their God ordained social class. She belonged to wealthy mercantile middle class which in her eyes was the most fortunate place to be. She believed that she had a duty to look after the education of her workers so they could progress.

When she visited her husband's relatives in Ulster in 1794 she was struck by the poverty of the Irish peasantry. In a letter written during this visit she demonstrates a degree of sympathy with Irish radicalism that she may have imbibed from her sister-in-law, Jane Greg: " ... certain will be the day of retribution - England has not so much to answer for - but the crimes of this country and the crimes of old France are crying and will be visited ... to be Irish has always been sufficient to make anything obnoxious to the English government".

On the eve of the Irish rebellion of 1798, the British commander, General Lake, denounced Hannah's sister-in-law (reputedly a leading United Irish woman) as "the most violent creature possible". Jane Greg found refuge at Quarry Bank from loyalist retribution. She was living with Hannah and Samuel when she died in September 1817.

Their daughter Ellen later recalled that in the wake rebellion her parents were anxious lest her aunt's reputation, and letters she held from Lady Londonderry (Frances Pratt), step mother to Robert Stewart, the Chief Secretary for Ireland) revealing a mutual sympathy for the United Irish cause, might bring suspicion upon Samuel, as "the only Irish gentleman in the town".

As pressure mounted on the Greg household with the suppression not only of Irish rebellion but also of radical dissent in England, Hannah wrote to William Rathbone: "we will hold fast to our Enthusiasm whatever betide, and I believe it is at least one means of holding fast our integrity". The prospect of continuing at Quarry Bank near the peaceful village of Styal may have had "particularly strong appeal".

== Children and her legacy ==
Hannah and Samuel had thirteen children, seven daughters and six sons. Four of their sons, Robert Hyde (1795–1875), John (1801–1882), Samuel Jr. (1804–1876) and William Rathbone (1809–1881), entered the business. Robert Hyde was also interested in astronomy and politics and was elected MP for Manchester in 1839. John was responsible for the Lancaster and Caton mills and eventually Bollington Mill. He served as alderman and mayor of Lancaster. Samuel Jr. took charge of Bollington Mill and unsuccessfully experimented with profit sharing; disillusioned, he became a preacher. William Rathbone was responsible for Hudcar Mill, Bury and then took over the troubled Bollington Mill; retiring from the business in 1850, he became Controller of Her Majesty's Stationery Office, and an avid essayist and pamphleteer.

Elizabeth Greg (1790–1882) married William Rathbone V, of the Liverpool mercantile family. She founded the first public wash-houses in the United Kingdom in the wake of the 1832 Liverpool cholera epidemic. Later she helped William Forster in formulating the Elementary Education Act 1870.

The extended family were also involved in slavery: some with the triangular trade and some with abolition. Hannah's sister Elizabeth married Thomas Hodgson, who took part in the Atlantic slave trade; their son Adam Hodgson was a founding member of the Liverpool Anti-slavery Society in 1822. Thomas Greg, Samuel's father and his brother John Greg part-owned some sugar plantations in the Caribbean, especially Dominica. The best documented is Hillsborough, which included the ownership of 71 male slaves and 68 female slaves. In January 1814, twenty slaves absconded, and were recaptured and punished with 100 lashes for the males and 50 lashes for the females. The incident was triggered by the death of a slave in the plantation-run hospital; the run-aways believed he had been poisoned.

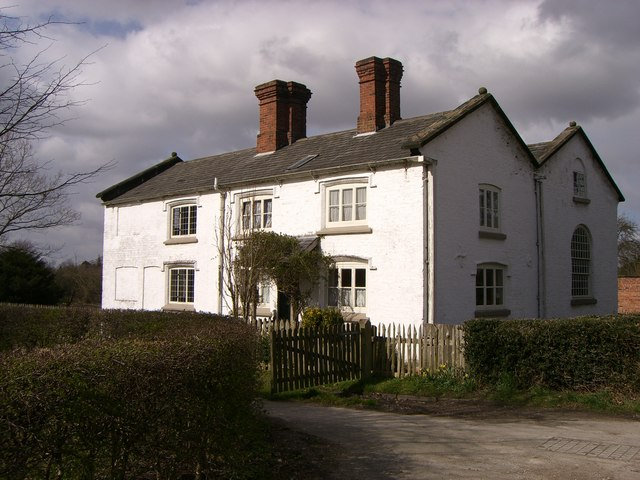
Apprentice House, Quarry Bank Mill, built in 1790, housed child apprentices

A former director of the Quarry Bank Mill, and author of a book about Hannah Greg, provided this summary of her philosophy and work.

She was liberal and compassionate by nature, and all her friends were active campaigners to stop the slave trade and to move forward the emancipation of the slaves in the West Indies and America ... In reality, Hannah Greg did not say anything publicly about this because, apart from anything else, Samuel Greg inherited slave plantations. She couldn’t be a public hypocrite so she kept quiet.

== See also ==
- Factory Acts
- List of textile mills in Cheshire
