= Listed buildings in Wilmslow =

Wilmslow is a town and civil parish in Cheshire East, England. The area, including the parishes of Handforth and Styal, contains 81 buildings that are recorded in the National Heritage List for England as designated listed buildings. Of these, one is listed at Grade I, the highest grade, eight are listed at Grade II*, the middle grade, and the others are at Grade II. The town has grown from a village to encompass some of the surrounding settlements to become a dormitory town for Manchester. Buildings listed within the town include the church and associated structures, a bridge, and former weavers' cottages. Also in the area is the village of Styal that was developed to house the workers at Quarry Bank Mill. The mill, associated structures, and many of the cottages in the village are listed. Elsewhere the listed buildings include country houses and associated structures, farms and farm buildings, bridges, public houses, chapels, and a viaduct.

== Key ==
Grade	Criteria
I	Buildings of exceptional interest, sometimes considered to be internationally important
II*	Particularly important buildings of more than special interest
II	Buildings of national importance and special interest

== Buildings ==
Name and location	Photograph	Date	Notes	Grade
Styal Cross; 53.34794°N 2.24867°W		Medieval	The original part of the cross is in sandstone and consists of three steps and a square base, standing on which is the shaft. This is also square and is tapering with chamfered corners; the top is broken. A new top had been added in the Victorian era, but was removed when the cross was moved to its present site in 1981. The top was replaced in 2010.	II
Font; 53.33003°N 2.22981°W		Late medieval	The former font was placed in its present position in the churchyard of St Bartholomew's Church in the 19th century. It is in sandstone and consists of an octagonal chamfered base carnying a plain column with an octagonal head. On the top is a truncated concave bowl.	II
Barn, Chonar Farm; 53.31283°N 2.21626°W	—	Late 15th century	Originally part of Denton Old Hall, later a barn. Formerly in timber, with brick walls added in the 18th century and replaced in about 1980. It has a rectangular plan, stands on a stone plinth, and has a Welsh slate roof. In the west front is a cart entrance and two pitch holes. The west gable contains original timberwork, and includes a mullioned window and quatrefoil decoration.	II
St Bartholomew's Church; 53.33011°N 2.22956°W		c. 1490	An earlier church was remodelled, and in 1522 the chancel was rebuilt. There were three restorations during the 19th century. The church is built in sandstone and has a roof of Kerridge stone-slate, and is mainly in late Perpendicular style. It consists of a nave with aisles, a chancel flanked by chapels, a north vestry, a south porch, the Hawthorne Chapel to the south, and a west tower. The tower has a battlemented parapet with pinnacles.	I
Beech Farmhouse; 53.35753°N 2.24398°W	—	15th or 16th century	A timber-framed farmhouse on a stone plinth that was altered in the early 17th century. The sides and rear are in rendered brick, and the roof is in Welsh slate. The farmhouse is in 1½ storeys, and has a north front of four bays. The windows are casements, one in a raking dormer. Inside are three pairs of full crucks.	II
16 Farm Fold Cottages; 53.34806°N 2.24629°W		16th century (or earlier)	Originally a timber-framed farmhouse, it was altered in the 17th century and extended in the following century. The building has also served as three mill workers' cottages, then a single house. It is now in brick and has a thatched roof. The building has an L-shaped plan, is in 1½ storeys, and has an eight-bay front. The left bay projects forward under a gable, and the windows are casements. Inside the house are two full pairs of crucks.	II
Oak Farmhouse; 53.34941°N 2.25051°W		Early 16th century	The farmhouse is timber-framed on a stone plinth, it was altered in the 17th century, the south face was replaced in brick in the late 18th century, and alterations were made by J. S. Crowther in about 1860. The infill is brick and plaster, and the farmhouse has a Kerridge stone-slate roof. It has a rectangular plan with a cross-wing, it is in two storeys, and has a four-bay front.	II*
13 and 14 Farm Fold Cottages; 53.34825°N 2.24717°W		16th century	A farmhouse that has been converted into two cottages, it is timber-framed with whitewashed brick infill and has a thatched roof. Crucks are still present in the gables and elsewhere. The cottages are in 1½ storeys and have a three-bay north front. The windows are casements, those in the upper floor being in gabled dormers that were added later.	II
Cross Farmhouse; 53.34639°N 2.24294°W		16th century	The farmhouse was extended in the early 17th century, the timber-framed core was re-walled in the late 18th century, and there were further alterations in the 19th century. The house is mainly in brick with stone dressings, and partly in whitewashed brick. The roof is partly of Kerridge stone-slate, and partly of Welsh slate. It has a T-shaped plan, is in two storeys, and has a five-bay east front, the right two bays projecting forward under a gable. The windows are casements, and there are porches on the east and north fronts. Inside are parts of a full cruck truss.	II
Handforth Hall; 53.34648°N 2.20718°W		1562	A timber-framed former manor house on a sandstone plinth, it has a Kerridge stone-slate roof. It is in two storeys, the upper storey being jettied and relatively tall, and it has a front of five bays. The house was at one time the home of Sir William Brereton. On the front of the house is a lintel carved with an elaborate inscription recording the circumstances of the building of the house.	II*
Hawthorn Hall; 53.32817°N 2.23776°W		c. 1610	Originally timber-framed, the house was encased in brick in 1698. It has since been used as a school and later as offices. The building has a Kerridge stone-slate roof, is in a long rectangular plan, and has 2½ storeys. On the front are four gables with bargeboards and finials. The doorway has pilasters, and above it is a hood mould framing a cartouche. At the top of the house is a balustrade and a lantern with a cupola and weathervane. Parts of the front garden wall are included in the listing.	II*
Brooke Farmhouse; 53.34910°N 2.21044°W		Early 17th century	The farmhouse is basically timber-framed, and was rewalled in brick in 1714, and altered again later. It stands on a sandstone plinth and has a Kerridge stone-slate roof. The farmhouse has a T-shaped plan, is in two storeys, and has a three-bay south front. The right bay projects forward under a gable. The windows are casements, and there is a date plaque on the west end. Inside are timber-framed partitions.	II
Finney Green Cottage; 53.33968°N 2.22169°W	—	Early 17th century (probable)	Originally a timber-framed farmhouse, later altered. It is partly roughcast over timber-framing, and has a Kerridge stone-slate roof. The house has a long rectangular plan, is in 1½ storeys, and has a seven-bay front. On the left is an 18th-century outshut, to the right of this is a verandah and further to the right is a gabled bay. The windows are casements.	II
Barn, Little Stannilands; 53.34128°N 2.22688°W	—	Early 17th century	The barn is mainly timber-framed on a stone plinth with some repairs in whitewashed brick. The roof is thatched. The barn has a rectangular plan and a three-bay west front containing 20th-century doors in a cart entrance.	II
Norcliffe Hall Farmhouse; 53.35143°N 2.25795°W	—	Early 17th century	The timber-framed farmhouse with brick nogging on a stone plinth was altered and extended in brick in the mid-19th century. The front is timber-framed, the rest is in brick and the roof is in Welsh slate. The farmhouse has a long rectangular plan, it is in two storeys, and has a four-bay front. Most of the windows are casements, with one mullioned and transomed window.	II
1, 2, 3, 4, 5, and 6/7 Shaws Fold; 53.34606°N 2.24307°W		17th century	Initially a timber-framed farmhouse and farm buildings on a stone plinth with Kerridge stone-slate roofs, a brick addition with a slate roof was added in 1721. They were later converted into seven mill workers' cottages. The cottages are in 1½ and two storeys, and have a 15-bay north front. The windows are casements, and there are two dormers.	II
Lease Farm Cottage; 53.34118°N 2.26713°W		17th century	Originally a farmhouse and a cottage, later a house, it is timber-framed on a brick plinth and has a thatched roof. The house has a long rectangular plan, is in 1½ storeys, and has a four-bay front. The windows are casements, and there is a dormer and a half-dormer.	II
Little Stannilands; 53.34130°N 2.22655°W	—	17th century	Originally a farmhouse and a barn, later converted into a house, with additions in 1931, 1960 and 1980. The older parts are timber-framed, and the newer parts have applied timber framing. The house has a thatched roof, a long irregular rectangular plan, is in two storeys, and has a nine-bay west front. The left three bays date from 1960, bays 4 and 5 are the original timber-framed building, and the other bays were the barn. The windows are casements, and there are two gabled dormers.	II
Oaklands; 53.31638°N 2.24302°W	—	17th century	A former farmhouse, timber-framed with brick nogging on a stone plinth with a Kerridge stone-slate roof. It is in 1½ storeys and has a three-bay front. The windows are casements. In the left bay is a gabled half-dormer, in the middle bay is a porch, and the right bay projects forward under a gable. At the rear are 19th-century extensions painted to resemble timber-framing.	II
Sundial; 53.32997°N 2.22966°W		17th century	The sundial is in the churchyard of St Bartholomew's Church. It consists of an octagonal baluster on two circular stone steps. The sundial has a heavy cap carrying a circular copper plate without its original gnomon.	II
The Worralls and Birch Farm Cottage; 53.34928°N 2.24259°W		17th century	Two attached houses, The Worralls being older and Birch Farm Cottage dating from the early 19th century. The Worralls is partly timber-framed on a brick plinth and partly in brick, and has a Kerridge stone-slate roof. It is in 1½ storeys and has a five-bay south front with three gabled dormers. Birch Farm Cottage is in brick with a Welsh slate roof. It is in two storeys and has a three-bay front. The windows are mullioned or mullioned and transomed.	II
Tudor Cottage; 53.34910°N 2.24863°W		17th century	Originating as a farmhouse, then two mill workers' cottages, and after that a house. It is mainly timber-framed on a stone plinth and is partly in brick, and it has a thatched roof. The cottage is in 1½ storeys, and it has a four-bay front. There are two dormers, one containing a horizontally sliding sash window. The other windows are casements.	II
Chestnut Tree Farmhouse; 53.35491°N 2.24767°W	—	Late 17th century	A timber-framed farmhouse on a stone plinth, with a brick extension added in the 18th century. Its roof is in Kerridge stone-slate. The house has a long rectangular plan, is in two storeys, and has a four-bay east front. On the front is a timber-framed gabled porch, and the windows are casements.	II
Piers, walls and gates, Hawthorn Hall; 53.32805°N 2.23726°W		Late 17th century	The oldest structures are the end and gate piers, the walls date from the late 19th century, and the gates are from the 20th century. The piers are in sandstone and have rusticated bodies and projecting capstones. The end pier also have pine cone finials on acanthus bases. The curving wing walls are in brick with a stone coping and the gates are in wrought iron.	II
Laburnum Cottage; 53.33031°N 2.19387°W	—	Late 17th century	Originally a farmhouse, later a public house, and then a house, the main part of the building dates from the early 19th century. This part is in brick with a tiled roof, it is in two storeys with a three-bay front, and contains sash windows. To the left is 17th-century single-storey timber-framed wing containing a casement window.	II
Fulshaw Hall; 53.31739°N 2.23590°W	—	1684	A country house that was extended 1735, restored in 1765, and further extended in 1886. It is built in brick on a stone plinth, and has stone dressings and a Kerridge stone-slate roof. The earlier part of the house is in 2½ storeys, and has a seven-bay front. The windows are mullioned and tramsomed or mullioned.	II
Hough Hall Farmhouse; 53.31888°N 2.19864°W	—	1691	The farmhouse was extended in the 19th and 20th centuries. It is built in brick with stone dressings and has a Welsh slate roof. The original part of the house is in three storeys and has a three-bay front. The windows are mullioned. On the lintel above the doorway is a shield carved with initial and the year. The later extensions are on both sides.	II
Dean Row Chapel; 53.33065°N 2.19514°W		1693	Originally a Presbyterian chapel, it later became Unitarian. The chapel is built in brick with sandstone dressings, and has a roof of Kerridge stone-slate. It is in two storeys, and has entrances on the front at both ends, approached by external staircases. The windows are mullioned. There is a ball finial on both gables, and on the west gable is a bellcote. Inside are box pews and galleries at both ends.	II*
187 Wilmslow Road; 53.35410°N 2.21734°W	—	1720	Originally a farmhouse, probably timber-framed, it is a house in rendered brick with a roof partly in Kerridge stone-slate, and partly in Welsh slate. It is in two storeys with a three-bay front, the left bay projecting forward under a gable. This bay has sash windows, the middle bay contains a porch, and the right bay has casement windows. On the right of this is a single-storey extension.	II
Dairy House Farmhouse; 53.34982°N 2.18808°W	—	Early 18th century	A brick farmhouse with a Kerridge stone-slate roof and a seven-bay south front. The right three bays are in 2½ storeys with a porch and a gabled half-dormer; the other bays are in two storeys. The windows are mullioned and transomed.	II
Rose Cottage; 53.34147°N 2.22648°W	—	1733	A brick house with a Kerridge stone-slate roof. It has a rectangular plan, is in two storeys, and has a three-bay front. In the centre is a timber-framed porch, behind which is a door with a lintel inscribed with the date and initials. The windows are casements.	II
5, 6, and 8 Farm Fold Cottages; 53.34802°N 2.24735°W		18th century	Originating as a barn, it was converted into six mill workers' cottages for Samuel Greg, and later into four houses, and then into three. The cottages are built in brick with Welsh slate roofs. They have a rectangular plan, are in two storeys, and have a front of eight bays. Two cottages were later added to the rear. The windows are casements.	II
9 and 10 Farm Fold Cottages; 53.34798°N 2.24697°W		18th century (or earlier)	Originally a farm building, it was converted into two cottages for Samuel Greg, The cottages are in brick with a thatched roof. They have a symmetrical long rectangular plan, are in 1½ storeys, and have a front of five bays. The windows are casements, those in the upper floor being in gabled dormers.	II
Methodist Chapel; 53.34787°N 2.24697°W		18th century	The building originated as a barn. It was converted into a Methodist chapel in 1833, and was given a new façade in about 1860. The chapel is built in brick with a Welsh slate roof. It has a rectangular plan with two parallel ridges, and is in a single storey with a three-bay west front. The windows are sashes. Inside the chapel is a long west gallery carried on iron columns.	II
The Grange; 53.35424°N 2.22467°W	—	Mid-18th century	A brick house with a hipped Welsh slate roof that was extended in the 19th century. Its main part is in two storeys, and has a three-bay front and a modillion cornice. The windows are sashes, and on the front is a cast iron verandah.	II
Former Natwest office 53.32659°N 2.22870°W		Mid- to late 18th century	The building originated as a rectory, and since that has been an office and then a restaurant. It is built in brick with a Kerridge stone-slate roof. The building has a rectangular plan, is in two storeys, and has a symmetrical east front of three bays. The doorcase has rusticated jambs and a rectangular fanlight, and the windows are sashes. On the south front is a two-storey bow window.	II
17 Farm Fold Cottages; 53.34818°N 2.24621°W		Late 18th century	Originally two cottages, later converted into one, it includes timber from and earlier date. The cottage is in 1½ storeys, it has a four- west front, and a thatched roof. The windows are casements, those in the upper floor being in gabled dormers.	II
Briercot; 53.33037°N 2.19357°W	—	Late 18th century	Originally a weaver's cottage, this is a brick house with a Welsh slate roof. It is in two storeys, and has a three-bay front. On the front is a central doorway and casement windows, and at the rear is a 20th-century extension.	II
Dower House; 53.33361°N 2.24768°W	—	Late 18th century	This originated as a farm cottage, then became an estate office, and after that a house. It was altered in 1888. The house is in roughcast brick on a stone plinth with a Kerridge stone-slate roof. It is in two storeys and has a five-bay front. In the middle bay is a two-storey timber-framed porch on a stone plinth. On the front of the house are decorative features including carved mythical beasts and an inscribed couplet.	II
Sundial House; 53.34959°N 2.24918°W		Late 18th century	The house is in roughcast brick, and has a hipped Welsh slate roof. It has a rectangular plan, is in two storeys, and has a five-bay front. The central bay contains a projecting porch, above which is a sundial with the Greg family motto. The windows are sashes. On the left side is a conservatory, and on the right side is a bow window.	II
Vardon Bridge; 53.32628°N 2.21200°W		Late 18th century	The bridge carries Adlington Road (A5102) over the River Bollin. It is built in sandstone and consists of a single segmental arch flanked by pilasters. A curving wall runs from the pilasters and ends in plain columns. A parapet with rounded coping was added in the 19th century.	II
Unicot; 53.33043°N 2.19338°W	—	Late 18th century	This originated as a silk weaving shed and a cottage, and were later converted into a house. It is built in brick and has a long rectangular plan with a front of six bays. The left three bays were the weaving shed, they are in a single storey, and have thatched roof. The right three bays were the cottage, they are in two storeys and have a slate roof. The windows are casements.	II
Quarry Bank Mill; 53.34353°N 2.25013°W		1784	A cotton mill built by Samuel Greg and extended in stages during the 19th century. It is built in brick with a Welsh slate roof. At the north end is a tall octagonal chimney. The mill is in five storeys and has a 23-bay east front. The right three bays are the original part, they project forward under a pediment with a clock. There is a central doorway with a pediment containing a painted inscription. On the top is an open bellcote with a lead cupola. On the east side is a massive wheel pit.	II*
Apprentices' House and Cottage; 53.34548°N 2.24675°W		1790	This was built by Samuel Greg to house the apprentices working in Quarry Bank Mill, it was later converted into flats, and then became part of a museum. It is constructed in brick with a Welsh slate roof. The house has a rectangular plan under two ridges, it is in three storeys, and has a west front of three bays. The gables are coped with ball finials. Most of the windows are casements, with one sash window on the east front.	II*
7, 11, 15 and 17 Manchester Road; 53.32826°N 2.22878°W		1792	A terrace of four stuccoed houses, with Welsh slate roofs, stepped down a hill. They have a long rectangular plan, are in three storeys, and have a front of 13 bays, the houses being divided by pilasters. The doorways are approached by flights of stone steps, and the doorcases vary. There is also a round-headed entry to the rear. The windows are sashes.	II
19, 21 and 23 Manchester Road; 53.32846°N 2.22868°W		1792	A row of three houses that originated as cottages for fustian cutters. They are built in brick and have a Welsh slate roof. The houses are in three and four storeys, with a six-bay front. The windows are sashes.	II
Quarry Bank House; 53.34424°N 2.24988°W		1797	The house was built for Samuel Greg and is in whitewashed roughcast brick on a stone plinth and has a hipped Welsh slate roof. The east front is in two storeys and three bays. There is a central porch with fluted columns and a glass roof, and behind it is fluted doorcase with a semicircular fanlight. The windows are sashes. The west front is in two storeys with a basement, and has a two-storey curving bay window.	II
31 Manchester Road; 53.32880°N 2.22853°W		Late 18th to early 19th century	Originally a weaver's cottage, later a shop. It is built in brick and has a Welsh slate roof. The building is in three storeys, and has a symmetrical three-bay front. In the ground floor is a doorway flanked by Georgian-style bowed windows. The middle floor has two sash windows, and in the top floor is a casement window.	II
Oversleyford Bridge; 53.34309°N 2.27744°W		Late 18th to early 19th century	The bridge carries a road over the River Bollin. It is built in sandstone and consists of a single segmental arch with low piers. The parapet is plain with a rounded coping.	II
Packhorse Bridge; 53.34403°N 2.25036°W		1820	A footbridge over the River Bollin built for Samuel Greg. It is in sandstone and consists of a single segmental arch with low piers. It has an open parapet incorporating ten piers.	II
1, 2, 3, 4/5, 6 and 7 Oak Cottages; 53.34860°N 2.24916°W		c. 1820	Originally a terrace of eight cottages, later converted into six cottages and an office. They are in brick with a Welsh slate roof. The cottages are in two storeys with basements, and have a front of 15 bays. The windows are casements, and the doors are approached by flights of four steps.	II
8, 10, 11, 13 and 14 Oak Cottages; 53.34836°N 2.24960°W		c. 1820	A terrace of seven cottages built by Samuel Greg for his mill workers. They are in brick with a Welsh slate roof. The cottages are in two storeys with basements, and have a front of 14 bays. The windows are casements, and the doors are approached by flights of four steps.	II
15, 17, 18 and 20 Oak Cottages; 53.34849°N 2.24974°W		c. 1820	A terrace of seven cottages built by Samuel Greg for his mill workers. They are in brick with a Welsh slate roof. The cottages are in two storeys with basements, and have a front of 14 bays. The windows are casements, and the doors are approached by flights of three steps.	II
22 Oak Cottages; 53.34856°N 2.24939°W		c. 1820	A former shop built by Samuel Greg, with later alterations. It is in brick with a Welsh slate roof, has two storeys, and a front of three bays. In the upper floor are horizontally sliding sash windows.	II
23, 24, 26 and 28 Oak Cottages; 53.34872°N 2.24929°W		c. 1820	A terrace of six cottages built by Samuel Greg for his mill workers, later converted into four cottages. They are in brick with a Welsh slate roof. The cottages are in two storeys with basements, and have a front of ten bays. The windows are casements, and the doors are approached by flights of four steps with wrought iron balusters.	II
33, 35, 37 and 39 Oak Cottages; 53.34899°N 2.24970°W		c. 1820	A terrace of six cottages built by Samuel Greg for his mill workers, later converted into four cottages. They are in brick with a Welsh slate roof. The cottages are in two storeys, and have a front of ten bays. The windows are casements.	II
George and Dragon public house 53.32969°N 2.22988°W		1822	The former public house is in rendered brick and has a Welsh slate roof. It is in three storeys, and has a three-bay front. The doorway has a triangular pediment, and the windows are sashes.	II
Norcliffe Chapel; 53.34766°N 2.25014°W		1822–23	Samuel Greg built the chapel for his workers. It was originally a Baptist chapel, but since 1833 has been Unitarian. In 1867 Robert Hyde Greg made alterations, including adding a chancel, a porch, and a new roof and windows. There were further additions in 1906. The chapel is built in brick with stone dressings and a Kerridge stone-slate roof. It consists of a nave, a chancel, a porch, and a club room. On the ridge is a timber bellcote with a pyramidal roof.	II
Styal County Primary School; 53.34820°N 2.24995°W		1823	The school was built by Samuel Greg, and was extended in the middle of the 19th century by Robert Hyde Greg. It is built in brick on a stone plinth and has a Welsh slate roof. The school has an L-shaped plan, is in one storey, and has a six-bay southeast front. The left bay projects forward under a gable, and the other bays are symmetrical. The windows are mullioned and transomed.	II
Bridge over gorge 53.34642°N 2.25336°W		c. 1825	The bridge is over a gorge in the Northern Woods. It was built for Samuel Greg, and is in sandstone. It consists of a single wide segmental arch carrying a narrow footpath. The bridge has an open parapet with low square piers, and taller piers at the ends.	II
29, 30, 31 and 32 Oak Cottages; 53.34883°N 2.24947°W		Early 19th century	A terrace of four weavers' cottages for Samuel Greg. They are in brick with a Welsh slate roof. The cottages have three storeys, and an eight-bay front. The windows are two-light horizontally-sliding sashes, and the pointed-arched doorways have fanlights.	II
Heald House Farmhouse; 53.33426°N 2.26916°W		Early 19th century	The brick farmhouse has a Welsh slate roof. It is in two storeys with a blind attic, and has a three-bay front, the central bay projecting slightly forward. In the outer bays are casement windows with stone sills and keystones.	II
Walton's butchers shop and attached house 53.348371°N 2.24325°W		Mid- to late 19th century	A former butcher's shop and adjoining house in brick with a Welsh slate roof. It is in two storeys, and has a two-bay front with a single-storey former shop to the left.	II
Old Ship Inn; 53.34835°N 2.24352°W		Early 19th century	A public house in whitewashed brick with a Welsh slate roof. It is in two storeys, and has a four-bay front. In the third bay is a doorcase with pilasters and a fanlight. The windows are horizontal-sliding sashes.	II
Friends' Meeting House; 53.32670°N 2.24177°W		1830	The meeting house is built in brick on a sandstone plinth, and has a hipped roof in Welsh slate. It has a rectangular plan, is in a single storey, and has a five-bay front. In the centre is a doorway, and the windows are round-headed sashes. To the right is a lower single-bay extension.	II*
Pownall Hall; 53.33377°N 2.24639°W		1830	An older country house was remodelled in 1830, and further changes were made in 1885–91 for the brewer Henry Boddington in Arts and Crafts style. It is built in sandstone with a tiled roof, it is in two storeys, and has a symmetrical seven-bay front. The porch and the parapet are castellated, and the windows are sashes. The decoration of the house includes the initials of people involved with the development of the house, which has subsequently been used as a school.	II*
1–7 Holt's Lane; 53.34729°N 2.24202°W		c. 1830	A terrace of seven cottages for Samuel Greg. They are in brick with a Welsh slate roof. The cottages have two storeys, and a 14-bay front. The windows in the lower floor are mullioned, and above they are casements.	II
Norcliffe Hall; 53.34814°N 2.25837°W		1830–31	A large country house for Robert Hyde Greg, it was designed by Thomas Johnson in Elizabethan style. It is built in brick with sandstone dressings, and has a Welsh slate roof. The house has an irregular plan, it is in 2½ storeys, and has a four-bay south front. In 1860 a billiard room and a four-stage tower with a lead cupola were added. The windows are mullioned or mullioned and transomed. Other features include irregular gables, and tall octagonal chimneys.	II
Wilmslow Bridge; 53.33019°N 2.22819°W		1834	The bridge carries Manchester Road over the River Bollin. It is built in sandstone and consists of a single nearly-semicircular arch with a plain parapet that was added later in the 19th century. The date is on the keystone. The bridge ends in square pilasters with curving revetment walls.	II
Mill Cottage; 53.34312°N 2.25037°W		Early to mid-19th century	Originally the mill manager's house, it is in whitewashed and rendered brick with a hipped Welsh slate roof. The house has a square plan, is in two storeys, and has a symmetrical three-bay front. In the centre is a trellised porch, and the windows are casements.	II
180, 182, 184 and 186 Wilmslow Road; 53.35383°N 2.21638°W	—	c. 1840	Originally a Methodist chapel, then altered for various uses, eventually as a hotel. It is built in brick and has a Welsh slate roof. The building has an H-shaped plan, the north and central wings being in two storeys, and the south wing in 2½ storeys. It contains a variety of types of windows.	II
Oversley Lodge; 53.34960°N 2.26664°W	—	c. 1840	A hunting lodge for Robert Hyde Greg, later converted into a house. It is built in sandstone and has a Welsh slate roof. The house has a T-shaped plan, is in two storeys, and has a four-bay west front. In the left two bays is a single-storey verandah over which is a timber-framed gabled dormer. In the right bay is a gable with bargeboards. Most of the windows are sashes.	II
Eastern railway viaduct 53.32899°N 2.22562°W		1842	The viaduct was designed by George Watson Buck for the Manchester and Birmingham Railway Company. It is built in brick with sandstone dressings, and consists of 13 segmental arches carrying the railway over the River Bollin.	II
41, 42, 43 and 44 Oak Cottages; 53.34885°N 2.24889°W		c. 1855	A terrace of four mill workers' cottages for Robert Hyde Greg. They are in brick with a Welsh slate roof, and form an H-shaped plan, with one cottage in each cross-wing, and two in the centre. They are in two storeys, and have an eight-bay front. In the ground floor are mullioned windows, and above are casements in raking dormers.	II
1, 2, 3 and 4 Farm Fold Cottages; 53.34826°N 2.24753°W		c. 1860	A row of four mill workers' cottages for Robert Hyde Greg. They are in brick with a Welsh slate roof, and form an H-shaped plan, with one cottage in each cross-wing, and two in the centre. They are in two storeys, and have an eight-bay front. In the ground floor are mullioned windows, and above are casements in raking dormers. The gables have pierced bargeboards.	II
19, 20, 21 and 22 Farm Fold Cottages; 53.34831°N 2.24638°W		c. 1860	A row of four mill workers' cottages for Robert Hyde Greg. They are in brick with a slate roof, they are in 1½ storeys, and have a nine-bay front. The windows in the ground floor are mullioned with stone sills, and in the upper floor they are casements in dormers, two of which are gabled.	II
Hillside Cottage and former stables 53.34974°N 2.25095°W		c. 1865	Designed as a groom's house and stables, probably by J. S. Crowther for Robert Hyde Greg, it was later used as a cottage and a shippon. The building is timber-framed on a plinth, partly in stone and partly in brick. The building is in a single storey, the left five bays were originally the stables, and have louvred ventilators on the ridge. The right two bays constitute the cottage, which has a gabled dormer with bargeboards and a finial. The windows are mullioned, or mullioned and transomed.	II
Beech Cottage and Fern Cottage; 53.34831°N 2.24638°W		Mid- to late 19th century	A pair of cottages built for Robert Hyde Greg. They are in red brick with blue brick diapering and tiled roofs. The cottages have an H-plan, they are in two storeys, and have a symmetrical four-bay front. The outer bays project forward under gables with pierced bargeboards, and the central bays contain timber-framed dormers. The windows are casements.	II
Sundial; 53.33035°N 2.19509°W	—	c. 1870	The sundial is in the churchyard of Dean Row Chapel. It is in sandstone, and has a square base on three square steps. On this is a chamfered shaft with a cornice carrying a square head with colonnettes at the corners. There are copper sundials on three faces, and on the north face is a plaque commemorating the founders of the chapel. On the top is a tiled pyramidal roof.	II
Restaurant, Fulshaw Hall; 53.31774°N 2.23589°W	—	1890	This originated as stables, a coach house, and an entrance arch. It is built in brick with stone dressings and has a Kerridge stone-slate roof. The building has an L-shaped plan, is in one and two storeys, and has a seven-bay south front. The right bay is gabled and has a ball finial. In front of this is a three-stage clock tower surmounted by a louvred wooden bellcote with a cupola roof. On the ridge of the building are louvred ventilators.	II
Lychgate; 53.32981°N 2.22969°W		1904	The lychgate is at the entrance to the churchyard of St Bartholomew's Church. It consists of open timber framing on a stone plinth with a roof of Kerridge stone-slate. Inside the lychgate are stone seats. Its decorative details include pierced panels and carved rosettes. On the tiebeam is an inscription in medieval script.	II
Styal War Memorial; 53.34760°N 2.24197°W		1921	The war memorial stands on a semicircular platform. It is in Portland stone, and has a square pedestal on a square plinth. The pedestal has a cornice and a frieze band, and is carved with emblems. On it stands a square, tapering obelisk that contains carvings and inscriptions, including the names of those lost in the two world wars.	II

== See also ==
- Listed buildings in Ringway
- Listed buildings in Altrincham
- Listed buildings in Manchester-M22
- Listed buildings in Stockport
- Listed buildings in Mottram St Andrew
- Listed buildings in Alderley Edge
- Listed buildings in Chorley
- Listed buildings in Mobberley
