= Samuel Finney =

Samuel Finney may refer to:

- Samuel Finney (politician)
- Samuel Finney (painter)
