= Fulshaw Hall =

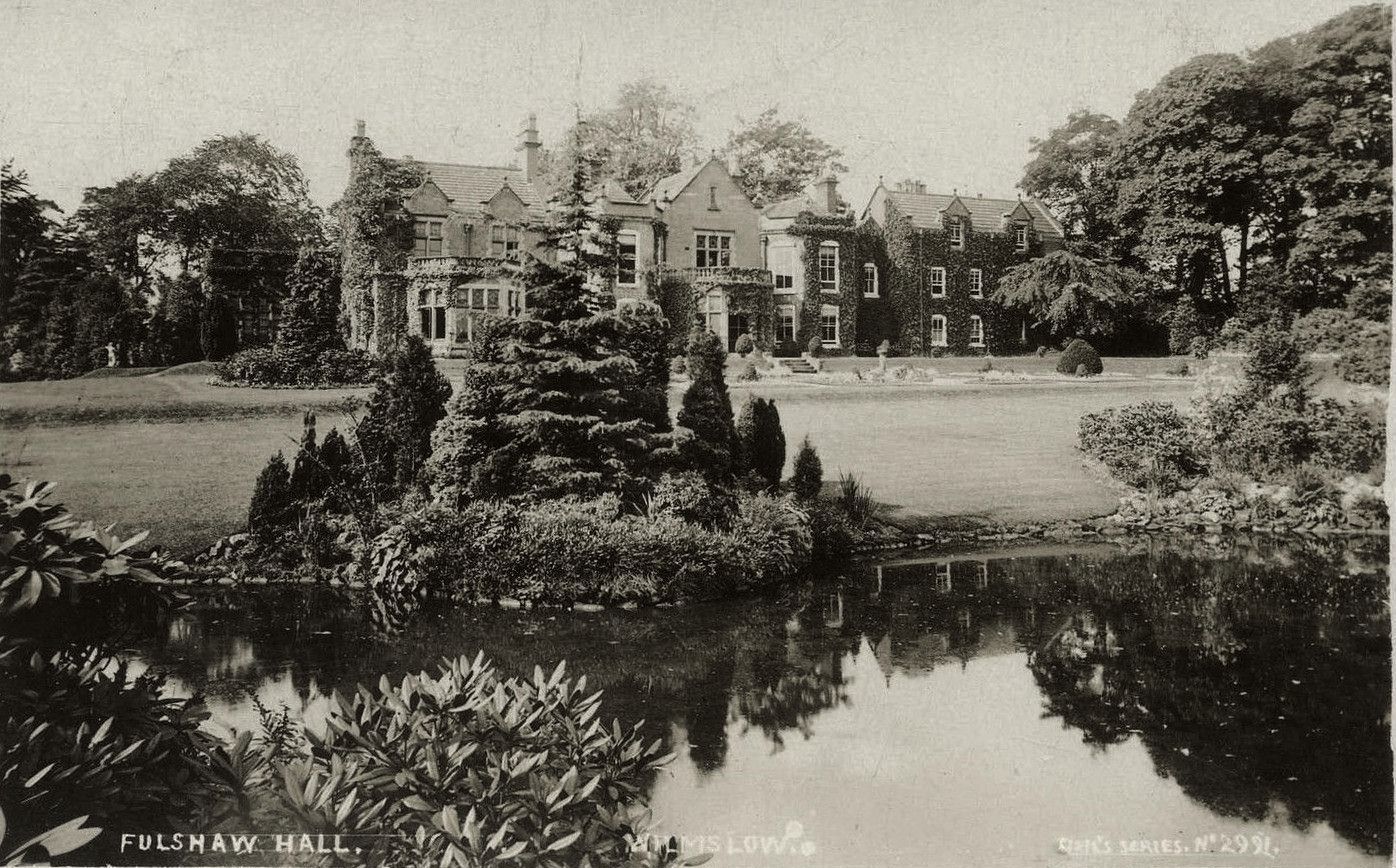
- Fulshaw in c.1913
- Interactive map of Fulshaw Hall
- Location: Wilmslow, Cheshire, England
- Coordinates: 53.31743°N 2.23588°W
- Built: 1684
- Built for: Samuel Finney I

Fulshaw Hall is a country house, south of the civil parish of Wilmslow, in Cheshire, England. It is recorded in the National Heritage List for England as a designated Grade II listed building.

Samuel Finney III, the miniature-painter to Queen Charlotte, lived at Fulshaw from 1769 until his death in 1798. The land was once held by the Knights Hospitalier during the reign of Henry III, and later requisitioned for the Special Operations Executive (SOE) during WWII.

The house was built with money generated from enslaved labour in the British West Indies.

== History ==
=== c.1200-1561 ===
Fulshaw was originally one of four settlements within the surrounding parish of Wilmslow. In c.1200, Robert de Fulshaw granted Richard Fitton the lordship of the Fulshaw manor. It was his son, Richard that granted the manor to the Order of St John of Jerusalem (or the 'Knights Hospitalier') during the reign of Henry III. The Knights Hospitalier then passed Fulshaw to Richard del Sherd in 1277, which was eventually passed to Geoffery de Verdon through his marriage to Margaret del Sherd. Fulshaw was held by the Verdons until 1561.

=== 1561-1682 ===
In 1561, a relative of Geoffery de Verdon, Thomas Verdon, sold Fulshaw to Humphrey Newton for £112. Newton had leased and lived at the house at Fulshaw since 1537. It was then sold to Roger Wilbraham of Nantwich in 1672, who lived there until 1682.

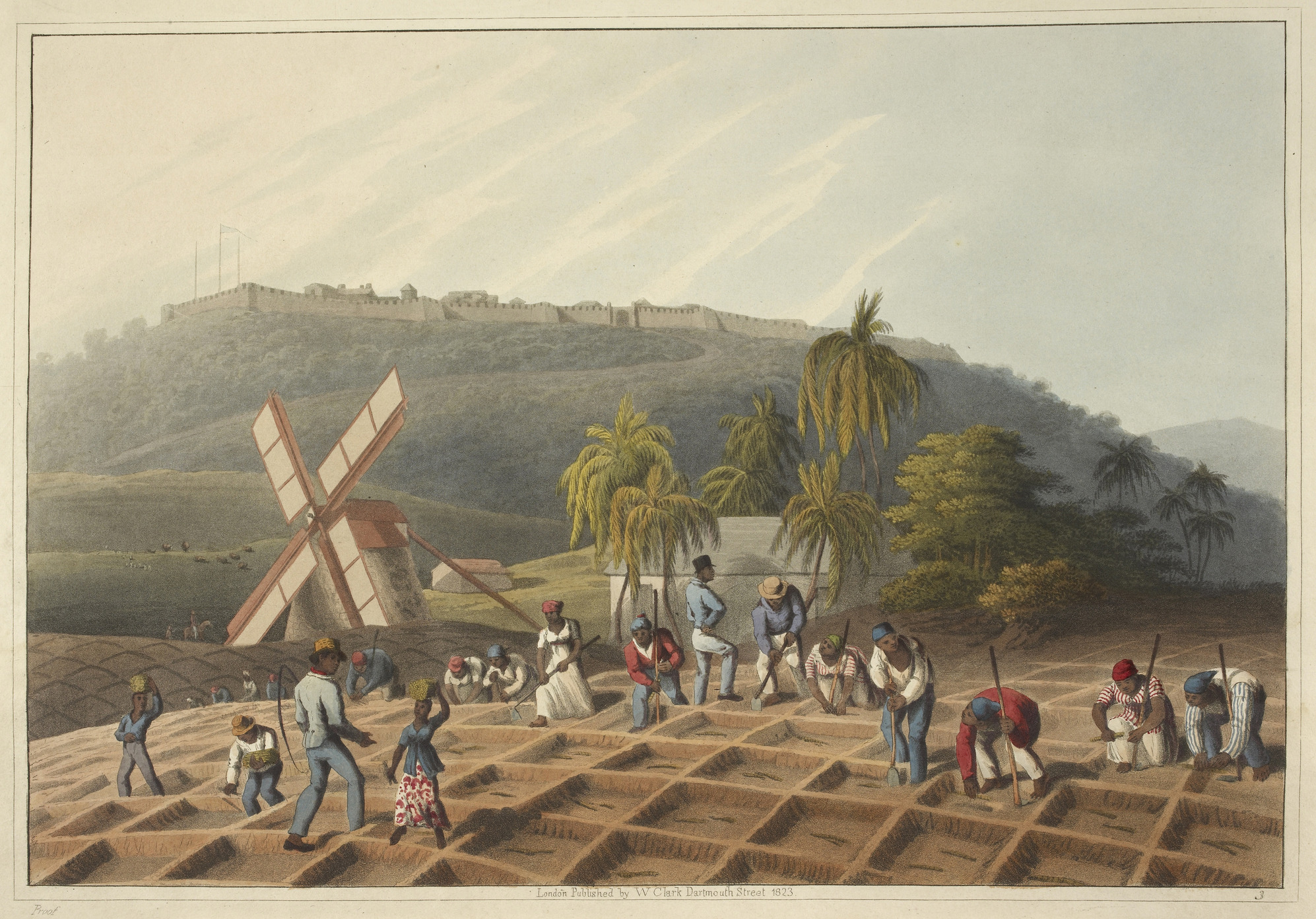
Samuel Finney I made the fortune that built Fulshaw Hall in the slave-operated sugar and cotton plantations of Barbados, then in the British West Indies.

=== 1682-1733 ===
Roger Wilbraham of Nantwich sold Fulshaw to Samuel Finney in 1682 for £2,100, upon the latter's return to England. Born in 1642 - most probably at Finney Green in Staffordshire, where is grandfather John Finney had settled - Samuel Finney had risen to become a prosperous merchant, making his fortune in the slave-operated sugar and cotton plantations of Barbados, then in the British West Indies. He married Mary Evans, the daughter of another planter and merchant in Barbados, and returned with her to England in c.1680.

At the time of purchasing Fulshaw from Wilbraham in 1682, Finney also purchased neighbouring plots of land then named "Alcock's Green", from Edward Alcock, which expanded the size of the estate. It was not until 1684 that Samuel Finney rebuilt the timber-framed manor house at Fulshaw. Although the origin of the existing house is debated, it was likely to have been built by the Verdons. The house that Finney replaced it with was considerably larger and more impressive, with a seven-bay symmetrical front that survives at the core of the building today.

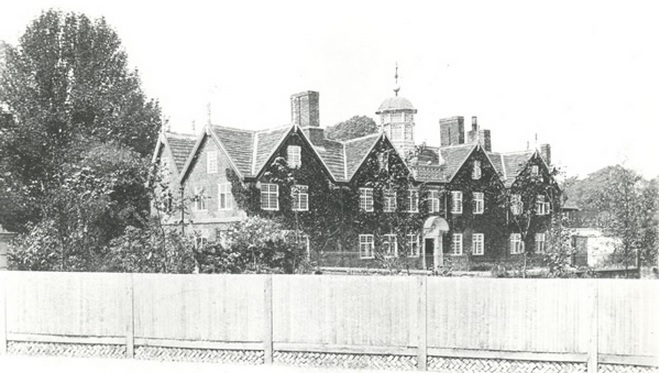
Hawthorn Hall, in c.1900. In 1688, Samuel Finney supported William of Orange by raising a troop of horse with his neighbour Thomas Latham of Hawthorn Hall. Their children would later marry.

In 1688, Samuel Finney and his son John supported William of Orange by raising a troop of horse, along with Thomas Latham of nearby Hawthorn Hall. John Finney later attained the rank of Captain, and married Latham's daughter, Jane, in 1693. In 1701, the Finneys left Fulshaw and emigrated to America, the reason of which remains uncertain. Samuel Finney became a member of William Penn's council in Pennsylvania, and settled near Philadelphia before his death in 1712.

John Finney returned to England in 1711, and acted as Captain of the Militia for Macclesfield Hundred in the Jacobite rebellion of 1715. It is now believed that John did not live permanently at Fulshaw, and so the house had declined into a state of disrepair upon his death in 1728, and remained uninhabited until 1733.

=== 1733-1769 ===
Following the death of John Finney in 1728, his eldest son Samuel Finney II inherited Fulshaw. Samuel had been born in 1696 and named after his grandfather. He married Esther Davenport and entered into a partnership with his father-in-law, Ralph Davenport in 1722, as a cloth merchant in Manchester.

In 1733, Samuel Finney II went to live at Fulshaw Hall. As the house was now in disrepair, he set about extensively restoring, altering and extending the house in 1735. However, he ruined himself financially in the process and then left for Philadelphia in 1738. There are little surviving records of him after this, and his last known whereabouts were in Philadelphia in 1764. There is little surviving record of the house between 1738 and 1769.

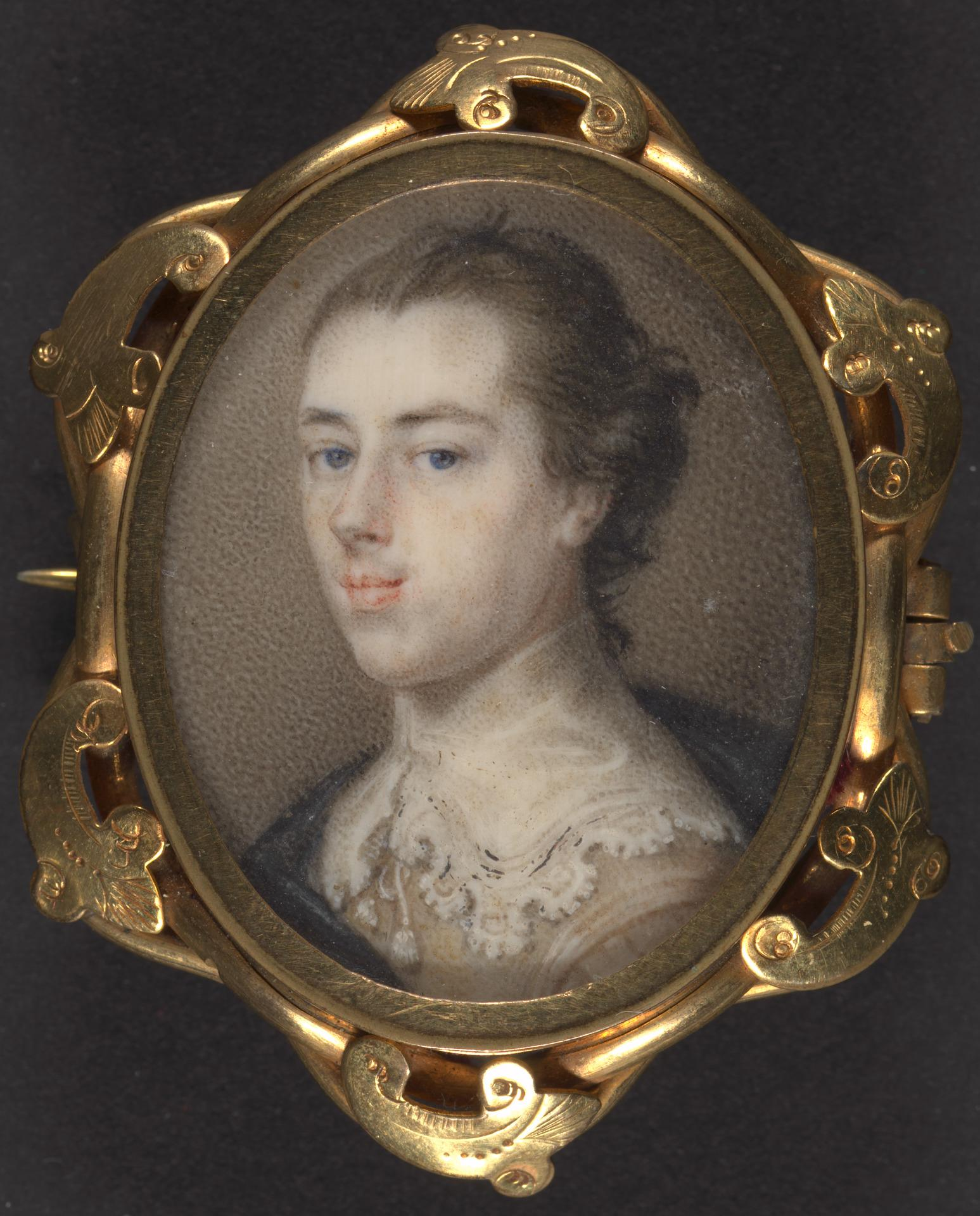
"Portrait of a Gentleman", a miniature-work by Samuel Finney III.

=== 1769-1798 ===
It was during 1769 that Samuel Finney II's eldest son, Samuel Finney III retired to live at Fulshaw.

Samuel Finney III, born in 1719, had gone to London to study law, but abandoned the profession for painting. He married Martha Foster in 1747, and after the latter's death, Ann Barlow. He established himself as a miniature-painter, working in watercolour on enamel and ivory. This became a success, and improved both the family finances and social status, and amassed a fortune sufficient to pay off the encumbrances brought upon Fulshaw by his father. In 1763 he was appointed miniature portrait painter to Queen Charlotte. He exhibited miniatures at the Exhibition of the Society of Artists in 1761, and exhibited a miniature of the Queen there in 1765.

Upon his return to Fulshaw, Finney became a Justice of the Peace in 1770, as well as a local historian. He compiled a number of works, such as A Historical Survey of the Parish of Wilmslow, and curated the collection of deeds for the Fulshaw estate that survives today. Finney's work contributed to the first volume of The Cheshire and Lancashire Historical Collector. He died in 1798, and was buried in Wilmslow, leaving no children.

=== 1798-1883 ===
Following the death of Samuel Finney III in 1798, his younger brother, Peter Davenport Finney, lived at Fulshaw. Born in 1733, Peter Finney began in the trade of confectionery in Manchester, in 1733. However, he soon built a successful and profitable grocery business, and soon engaged in mercantile trading overseas. He retired to a house which he himself built nearby at Oversley Ford in 1785. He died at Fulshaw in 1800.

The heir to Fulshaw was the grandson of Peter Finney's sister, Jane Tate, who was named Peter Finney II. Peter Finney II had been born in 1795, and was five years of age when the house was bequeathed to him. His father Samuel Tate had already changed his name through licence to Finney in 1788, predicting that a situation in which it was necessary would occur. Samuel Tate/Finney saw the birth of his son Peter in 1795, but died before the house was given to him in 1800.

Peter Finney II was eventually married at Greenock during 1821, to Mary Williams, the daughter of a stone merchant from Chester, but his death in 1824 left Mary with an infant son and a legal challenge to establish the validity of the marriage before their son, Peter Finney, could become heir to Fulshaw, as there was a dispute over it. Mary Finney died in 1827, and the orphaned Peter Finney III died in 1840 at sixteen years of age.

There was no direct heir following the death of Peter Finney III, but it was then traced to John Jenkins, who descended from Alice Finney, a sister of Samuel Finney III and Peter Finney I. He resided at Fulshaw until his death in 1883.

=== c.1885-1939 ===
Richard Lingard Monk purchased Fulshaw in c.1885 and carried out a number of major additions and alterations; namely refacing the house in Accrington brick in 1886, and building a coach house and stables in 1890. Little is known about Monk himself, when he was born, when he died, or when he moved out of Fulshaw.

=== 1939- ===
Fulshaw was requisitioned by the War Office during the Second World War, and became a major base for the Special Operations Executive (SOE) to train agents to conduct espionage, sabotage and reconnaissance in occupied Europe (and later, also in occupied Southeast Asia) against the Axis powers, and to aid local resistance movements.

A study by John Chartres discovered that among the trainees were important 'Jedburghs’, which were groups of usually three officers that had the task to parachute into France, alongside the Allied Forces and act as liaison teams, making direct contact with the French Resistance. Parachuting was a frequent exercise within the grounds at Fulshaw.

Fulshaw was later used as offices by Imperial Chemical Industries, and later by AstraZeneca. It remains in use as offices.

== Architecture ==
The entry for the Grade II listing of Fulshaw Hall, by Historic England reads:

Formerly manor house, now offices, 1684 for Samuel Finney, additions dated 1735 for Samuel Finney II, major additions, refacing in brick, and alterations dated 1886 for R Lingard Monk. Flemish bond plum brick with painted sandstone dressings. Kerridge stone-slate roof and brick chimneys. Extensions in Accrington brick with stone dressings.

The oldest remaining part of the house is the building constructed in 1684 for Samuel Finney, with 2 1/2 storeys, and a symmetrical seven-bay front. Behind this are the 1735 additions built for Samuel Finney II. To the north of the hall is the former coach house and stables built by Lingard Monk in 1890. They were constructed in orange brick and have an L-shaped plan. The house is recorded in the National Heritage List for England as a designated Grade II listed building. The stables are also listed at Grade II.

To the north of the hall are the former coach house and stables built by Lingard Monk in 1890. They are constructed in orange brick and have an L-shaped plan.

The house is recorded in the National Heritage List for England as a designated Grade II listed building. The stables are also listed at Grade II.

== See also ==
- Listed buildings in Wilmslow
