= Norcliffe Chapel =

Coordinates: 53.3477°N 2.2501°W

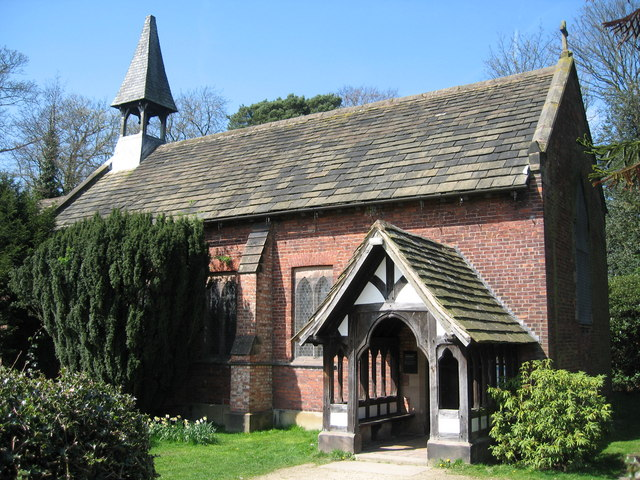
- Norcliffe Chapel

- Location in Cheshire
- OS grid reference: SJ 835 835
- Location: Styal, Cheshire
- Country: England
- Denomination: Unitarian
- Website: Norcliffe Chapel

History
- Founded: 1822
- Founder: Samuel Greg

Architecture
- Functional status: Active
- Heritage designation: Grade II
- Designated: 6 July 1984
- Architectural type: Chapel
- Style: Gothic Revival
- Groundbreaking: 1822
- Completed: 1906

Specifications
- Materials: Brick with stone dressings Kerridge stone-slate roof

Norcliffe Chapel is in the village of Styal, Cheshire, England. It is a Unitarian chapel, and is recorded in the National Heritage List for England as a designated Grade II listed building. The chapel was built in 1822–23 by a mill owner for his workers, and was extended by his son in 1867. Further additions were made in 1906. The chapel is built in brick, and is in Gothic Revival style. Since 1977 it has been in the ownership of the National Trust, but continues to function as an active Unitarian chapel.

== History ==
The chapel was built at a cost of nearly £308 in 1822–23 (equivalent to £33,834 in 2025). It was paid for by Samuel Greg, the founder and owner of Quarry Bank Mill, and was for the use of his workers. Greg was a Unitarian but many of his workers were Baptists. The chapel originally served the latter denomination, but since 1833 it has been Unitarian. The chapel was a simple structure with a rectangular plan, rectangular windows, a flat roof, and a small belfry. It also had a full-sized baptismal pool. The chapel had no chancel or porch. Samuel Greg died in 1834, and ownership of the chapel passed to his son, Robert Hyde Greg, who was also a Unitarian. In 1867 he commissioned improvements to the chapel. A chancel, a porch, buttresses, and a plinth were added, the door was moved, the flat roof was replaced by a pitched roof, Gothic-style windows containing stained glass were inserted, and a larger bellcote was built. (Note: Hartwell et al. suggest that the architect who designed the alterations was probably J. S. Crowther.) The improvements cost £1,000.

Robert Hyde Greg died in 1878, and in the following year a trust was set up to administer the chapel. In 1906 a council room and a vestry were added, which were designed by Thomas Worthington. The chapel continued to be administrated by the trust, but by 1977 the Styal estate, other than the chapel, was owned by the National Trust. The chapel was in need of repairs that could not be afforded by the chapel trust, and its ownership passed to the National Trust. The chapel continues in use as an active Unitarian chapel.

== Architecture ==
Norcliffe Chapel is built in brick on a stone plinth with stone dressings, and has a roof of Kerridge stone-slate with a stone ridge. It consists of a five-bay nave, a three-bay chancel, a southeast porch and a council (or club) room to the north. The bays are divided by buttresses, and each bay contains a pair of lancet windows in a rectangular surround. The east window has three lights, with a rose window in its apex. The porch is timber-framed, open and gabled. On the ridge of the nave is a square open bellcote with a pyramidal roof. Inside the church are memorials to the Greg family. There is also a font that was designed by Henry Russell Greg. The pipe organ was installed in 1884, and made by Foster and Andrews of Hull at a cost of £272. It has two manuals, a pedal keyboard, and 13 stops. The chapel was designated as a Grade II listed building on 6 June 1984. (Note: Grade II is the lowest of the three gradings awarded to listed buildings, and is applied to "buildings of national importance and special interest".)

== See also ==
- Listed buildings in Wilmslow
