= Walter Greg (rugby union) =

England international rugby union player

- Born: 14 February 1851 Bollington, Cheshire, England
- Died: 6 February 1906 (aged 54) Assouan, Egypt
- School: Marlborough College

Rugby union career
- Position: Forward
Amateur team(s)
Years	Team	Apps	(Points)
–	Manchester Football Club		
–	Lancashire		
–	North of England		
International career
Years	Team	Apps	(Points)
1875–1876	England	2	

Walter Greg (14 February 1851 – 6 February 1906) was an English rugby union forward who represented England twice in 1875 and 1876.

== Early life and education ==
Greg was born at Bollington, Cheshire, the son of Samuel Greg, the industrialist and philanthropist, and Mary Priscilla Greg (née Needham). The family resided at Mount House, Bollington.

He was educated at Marlborough College, entering in 1868.

== Legal career ==
After leaving school, Greg entered the legal profession. He served as an articled clerk and qualified as a solicitor in 1876, practising in Manchester while residing in Prestbury, Cheshire.

== Rugby career ==
Greg played as a forward for Manchester Football Club, one of the leading northern clubs of the period.

In 1874 he was selected to represent the North in the North v South rugby union match fixture at The Oval, Kennington, one of the principal representative matches of the era.

He was capped twice for England during the 1875–76 season:

- England v Ireland, Dublin — 13 December 1875
- England v Scotland, The Oval — 6 March 1876

Both matches were played under the 20-a-side laws then in force, and England won on each occasion.

Greg was also associated with Lancashire representative rugby during the mid-1870s.

== Marriage and family ==
On 17 October 1878, Greg married Susan Elizabeth Gaskill at Wyke Regis, Dorset. He was described at the time as a solicitor of Prestbury, Cheshire. The couple had four children.

== Death ==
Greg died on 6 February 1906 at the Cataract Hotel, Assouan, Egypt.
