= Norcliffe Hall =

- Location in Cheshire
- 53.3482°N 2.2583°W
- Location: Styal, Cheshire, England
- OS grid reference: SJ 829 835

History
- Built: 1831
- Built for: Robert Hyde Greg

Site notes
- Architect: Thomas Johnson
- Architectural style: Elizabethan

Listed Building – Grade II
- Designated: 6 March 1975
- Reference no.: 1222267

Norcliffe Hall is a large house encompassing 20,254 square feet near the village of Styal, Cheshire, England. It stands to the west of the village and to the north of Styal Country Park. It was built in 1831 for Robert Hyde Greg, the owner of Quarry Bank Mill, and designed by the Lichfield architect Thomas Johnson. In 1860 a four-stage tower and a billiard room were added.

It is constructed in orange brick in Flemish bond brickwork with pink sandstone dressings. It is roofed in Welsh slates, and has octagonal brick chimney stacks. The architectural style is Elizabethan. It has an irregular plan, and is in 2½ storeys with a south front of four bays. It was designated as a Grade II listed building on 6 March 1975.

During the 20th century the house was used as a care home for the elderly. As of 2007 it was being converted into residential apartments. The house is surrounded by parkland and lawned areas.

== See also ==
- Listed buildings in Wilmslow
