= Jane Greg =

Irish republican agitator

- Jane second from the left. Detail from portrait of Thomas Greg and family by Stickland Lowry c.1764
- Born: 1749; Belfast, Ireland
- Died: 1817 (aged 67–68); Quarry Bank Mill, Cheshire England
- Movement: Society of United Irishmen

Jane "Jenny" Greg (1749–1817) in the 1790s was an Irish republican agitator with connections to radical political circles in England. Although the extent of her activities is unclear, in suppressing the Society of United Irishmen the British commander, General Lake, described Greg as "the most violent creature possible" and as someone who had caused "very great [political] mischief" in her native Belfast.

== Child of a trans-Atlantic fortune ==
Greg was the second of thirteen children born to Elizabeth (Hyde) (1721–1780) and Thomas Greg of Belfast (1718–1796). With his business partner and brother-in-law, Waddell Cunningham, her father commanded one of the greatest mercantile fortunes in Ireland.

The son of a Scottish blacksmith, in the 1740s Thomas Greg bought a small ship which carried provisions to the West Indies and returned with flaxseed. Dealings in New York brought him into contact and partnership with Waddell Cunningham, another Belfast Presbyterian. By 1775 Greg and Cunningham was one of the largest shipping companies in New York, having benefited from the rise in the prices of provisions during the Seven Years’ War and from the license to attack and plunder enemy vessels. After the war, Greg and Cunningham set up sugar plantation on Dominica called "Belfast" for which Greg's brother John, already established on the island, supplied slaves.

At home, as Belfast's richest merchants, the partners began to improve the town's commercial infrastructure, investing in the Lagan navigation canal, new docks and quays, and the construction of the White Linen Hall which, together, attracted the linen trade to Belfast that had formerly gone through Dublin.

In the 1780s Cunningham cut a patriotic figure as a patron and officer of the Volunteers. Formed in anticipation of a French attempt upon Ireland during the American War, in the Presbyterian north the independent militia demonstrated sympathy for their kinfolk in the colonies with parallel demands for free commerce and Irish legislative independence. Jane's father may have shared a disdain for the Church of Ireland Ascendancy (in 1783 he refused a Baronetcy). but with Cunningham, Thomas Greg alienated popular and radical opinion. Townspeople looked with favour neither on their eviction of poor tenants from lands in which they had speculated nor their proposal to commission Belfast vessels for the Middle Passage.

== Radical connections in England ==
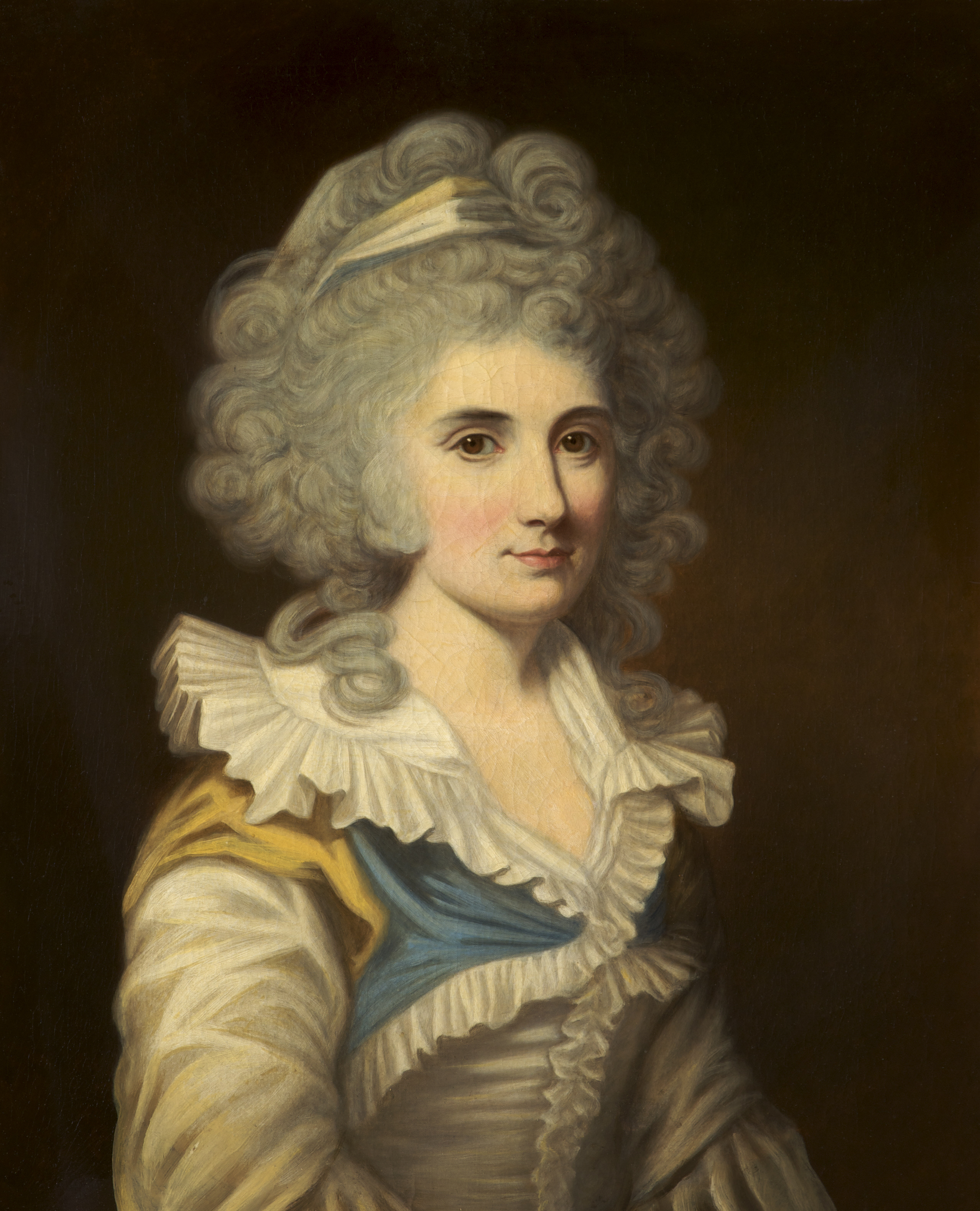
Hannah (Lighbody) Greg

In a public debate following Belfast's 1792 "Bastille Day" celebrations, Cunningham's objection to an immediate and liberal extension of the franchise to include Catholics was defeated by interventions from members of a new democratic club. The Society of United Irishmen proposed the "equal representation of all the people" in the Irish parliament and its "real independence" from England.

If there were family connections on Jane Greg's path to these radical reformers they were likely, not her father and his associates, but her sister-in-law. Jane Greg spent most of her adulthood in England in the society of her younger brother Samuel Greg. In Manchester, Samuel, who with his maternal uncles rose to be one of the great northern "cotton kings", married Hannah Lightbody. Like many northern merchant families, the Lighbodys were Unitarians, their indulgence of "rational dissent" broadly comparable to the "New Light" teaching of Belfast's Glasgow-educated Presbyterian clergy. Hannah completed her education at a Unitarian academy at Stoke Newington outside London, where she lived with her cousin Thomas Rogers, a close friend and an immediate neighbour to Richard Price.

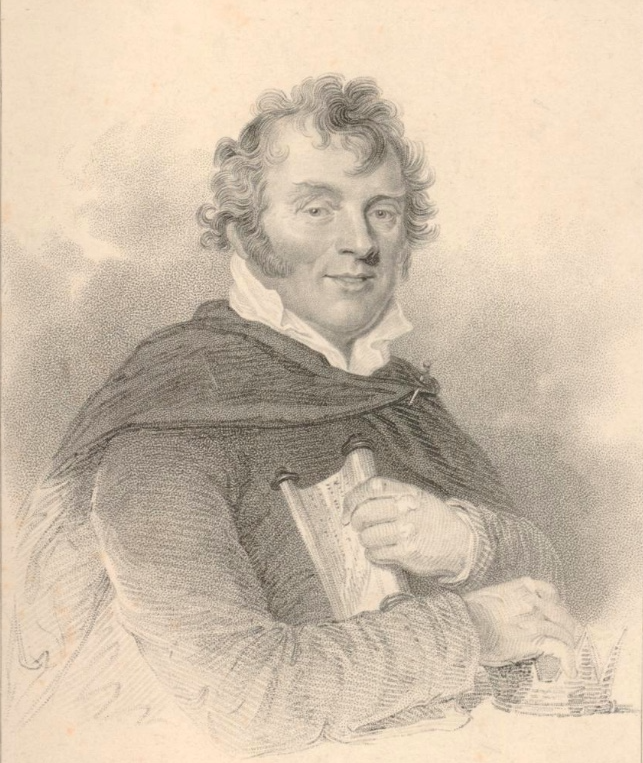
Roger O'Connor

Richard Price was the "non-conforming minister of eminence" that Edmund Burke pilloried in his Reflections on the Revolution in France (1790) as the leading light of a circle of "literary caballers and intriguing philosophers" naïve and seditious in their embrace of the French revolutionary doctrine of popular sovereignty. Possibly with her sister-in-law as a connection, Greg was closely acquainted with a number of these figures, including John Horne Tooke of the London Corresponding Society (arrested, but acquitted, in 1794 of high treason) and Roger O'Connor. In London, O'Connor, with his brother Arthur, were seeking to build a network of sympathetic contacts for the United Irish cause.

Among Price's friends, Greg may also have met, and will certainly have read, Mary Wollstonecraft. With her Vindication of the Rights of Men she was the first (in advance of Thomas Paine) to reply to Burke. Her subsequent, and ground-breaking, A Vindication of the Rights of Woman (1792) was the talk of Greg's close friend Martha McTier in Belfast, where it had been reviewed and commended by the United Irish paper, the Northern Star Wollstonecraft's call for women to secure the liberty without which they could "neither possess virtue or happiness" may have been among the reasons Greg gave herself for refusing marriage.

Greg shared McTier's abhorrence for the highly-restrictive model of education for the poor advanced by the conservative evangelical Hannah More. Having encountered Hannah More and her sisters in Bath and discussed their schools and other good works, Greg reported to McTier that she found their "minds crippled in an astonishing degree". McTier prided herself that in her school for poor girls in Belfast, her pupils "do not gabble over the testament only" and that she had those who "can read Fox and Pitt".

== United-Irishwoman in Belfast ==
Martha (Drennan) McTier

Sometime in the mid-1790s, Jane Greg returned to Belfast. It is possible that it was in the company of Arthur O'Connor, who was determined to contest what had been the Irish parliamentary seat of his uncle Lord Longueville in Antrim. In January 1797, to the "free electors" of the county he commended the "entire abolition of religious distinctions" and the "establishment of a National Government". But canvassing under what he protested was the "occupation" of the country by English and Scottish troops proved impossible. O'Connor returned to England, where he was arrested in March 1798 attempting to cross the Channel on a mission with Father James Coigly to solicit French assistance. Meanwhile, Greg in Belfast was under surveillance.

In May 1797 the Belfast Postmaster, Thomas Whinnery, alerted the Dublin Castle authorities of her correspondence with Martha McTier, already under watch as the sister and confidante of William Drennan. Whinnery described Greg as "very active" in Belfast and "at the head of the Female Societies" in the town.

Greg may have been the author of a letter appearing in the United Irish paper in Belfast, the Northern Star in October 1796. which opens:

I am directed by the Society of United Irishwomen to which I am Secretary, by your favour, to notice a publication which we have read in The News Letter ... signed A Lover of Truth. It is evidently from its levity, designed for our sex, but we wish to shew, that women as we are, we are not to be taken by anything so light.

The author proceeds to turn back the charges levelled by the “Lover of Truth" of political violence against both the American and French revolutions. Blame lay rather with the English who waged war upon the new republics.

There appears to be no other record of a Society of United Irishwomen in Belfast, but it is possible that it was related to the so-called "teapot clubs" that Samuel McSkimmin, an early chronicler of the United Irish movement, recorded as being formed across Ulster for the purposes of picking up intelligence and collecting funds.

In 1797 Jane's brother, Cunningham Greg, was suspected of contributing significant amounts of cash for the support of United Irish prisoners in Dublin. In November of that year, Lord Lieutenant Camden informed the British Home Secretary, the Duke of Portland that Jane Greg and her brother had been giving food and assistance to some members of the Monaghan militia imprisoned in Belfast, who had been condemned to death for joining the United Irishmen. Her brother's house was attacked by loyalist members of the militia, an action that appears to have been condoned by Dublin Castle. This may have led her to leave Belfast and seek shelter with her brother Samuel in Manchester.

Greg was reported to have been stopped and searched for United Irish propaganda upon her arrival in England. Not found on her person were letters that might have revealed the political sympathies of Lady Londonderry, Frances Stewart, sister to the Lord Lieutenant of Ireland, Earl Camden, and stepmother of the Irish Chief Secretary, Viscount Castlereagh. Samuel Greg, who gave his sister refuge in Manchester, was anxious lest her friendship with Lady Londonderry "and her letters" bring suspicion upon him, as "the only Irish gentleman in the town". Reflecting on the precariousness of her own position, Lady Londonderry had written to her friend "not to be surprised" if she hears that "a certain republican countess" has been denounced.

In 1800, after the crushing of the 1798 Rebellion, Greg returned to Belfast with the children of Roger O'Connor who had been visiting their father, then imprisoned at Fort George, Scotland. She was in the company of George Smith, a radical London barrister, who had defended both the O'Connor brothers in their trials for sedition. Martha McTier thought this was an imprudent decision on Greg's part: "It was curious and rather unlucky, that after all which passed and the far more which has been said, poor JG should make her first entrance here with an O'Connor party".

== Death ==
Greg did not remain in Belfast. She lived once more with her brother Samuel and his wife Hannah Greg at Quarry Bank Mill in Cheshire. Drennan wrote from England in September 1817 to inform his sister of her death, recalling a "smart, volatile, vain and versatile woman".
