= William Rathbone Greg =

English essayist

William Rathbone Greg (1809 – 15 November 1881) was an English essayist.

== Life ==
Born in Manchester, the son of Samuel Greg, the creator of Quarry Bank Mill, and Hannah Greg, he was brother to Robert Hyde Greg and the junior Samuel Greg.

He was educated at the University of Edinburgh. In 1827, he joined the Plinian Society, on the same day as Charles Darwin. Greg offered a talk to prove "the lower animals possess every faculty & propensity of the human mind".

He was elected to membership of the Manchester Literary and Philosophical Society on 26 April 1833.

For a time, he managed a mill of his father's at Bury, and in 1832 began business on his own account. He entered the struggle for free trade, and obtained in 1842 the prize offered by the Anti-Corn Law League for the best essay on Agriculture and the Corn Laws. He was too busy with political, economical and theological speculations to give undivided attention to his business, which he gave up in 1850 to devote himself to writing. His Creed of Christendom was published in 1851, and in 1852 he contributed no less than twelve articles to four leading quarterlies. Disraeli praised him. Sir George Cornewall Lewis bestowed a Commissionership of Customs on him in 1856. In 1864 he was made Comptroller of Her Majesty's Stationery Office.

In 1868 he responded to Darwin's On the Origin of Species with an article in Fraser's Magazine, "On the failure of 'Natural Selection' in the case of Man". In this he argues that natural selection no longer operates within civilised societies, endorsing eugenicist ideas to counter this fact. Darwin cited this, and responded, in The Descent of Man.

He became a member of the Metaphysical Society. Besides contributions to periodicals he produced several volumes of essays on political and social philosophy. The general spirit of these is indicated by the titles of two of the best known, The Enigmas of Life (1872) and Rocks Ahead (1874). They represent a reaction from the high hopes of the author's youth, when wise legislation was assumed to be a remedy for every public ill. Greg was interested in many philanthropic works. He died at Wimbledon, London.

He was married in 1835 to Lucy, daughter of William Henry, and also of Manchester. His second wife was the daughter of James Wilson.

One son, Percy Greg, was also a writer; another, Walter Wilson Greg, was a leading bibliographer of English Renaissance theatre.

== Bibliography ==
- Sketches In Greece and Turkey: With the Present Condition and Future Prospects of the Turkish Empire (1833)
- Efforts for the Extinction of the African Slave Trade (1840)
- Creed of Christendom (1851)
- Truth versus edification (1869)
- On the Failure of 'Natural Selection' in the Case of Man (1868)
- Why are Women Redundant? (1869)
- The Enigmas of Life (1872)
- Rocks Ahead; or, the Warnings of Cassandra (1874)
- Prostitution (1850)
- Essays on Political and Social Science Vol 1 (1853)
- Essays on Political and Social Science Vol 2 (1853)
