= Samuel Finney (painter) =

English miniature-painter (1719–1798)

Samuel Finney JP
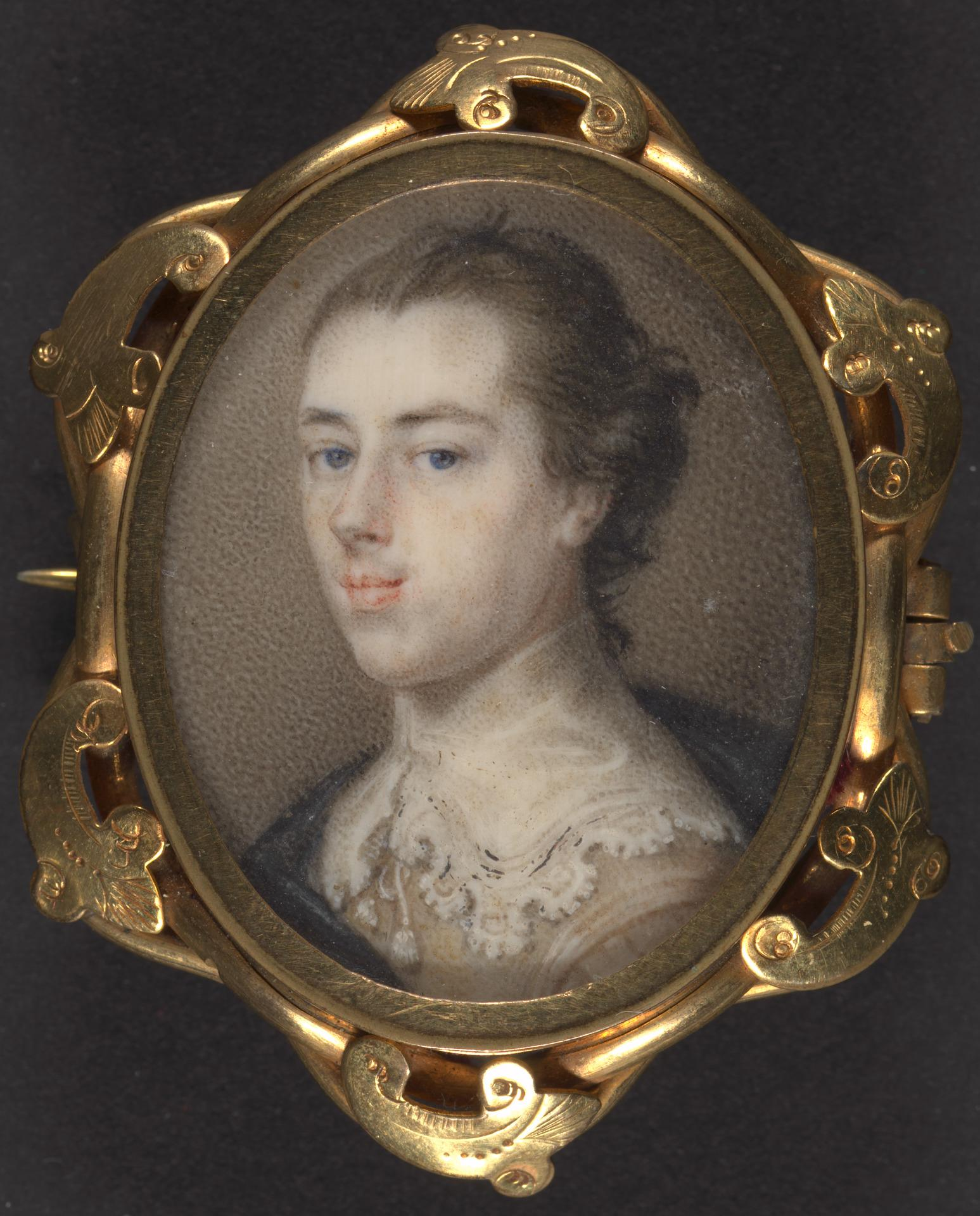
- A miniature work by Samuel Finney, a "Portrait of a Gentleman"
- Born: 13 February 1719; Fulshaw Hall, Wilmslow, Cheshire, England
- Died: February 1798 (aged 78–79); Wilmslow, Cheshire, England
- Occupation: Miniature painter

Samuel Finney (13 February 1719 – 1798) was an English miniature-painter who was appointed "enamel and miniature painter" to Queen Charlotte.

== Life ==
Finney was born at Fulshaw Hall, in Wilmslow, Cheshire on 13 February 1719, and was the eldest son of Samuel Finney II and Esther, daughter of Ralph Davenport of Chorley.

His family facing monetary difficulties, Finney came to London to study law, but left the profession for painting. He established himself as a miniature-painter, working both in enamel and ivory, and was very successful. He exhibited miniatures at the Exhibition of the Society of Artists in 1761, and in 1765 exhibited a miniature of Queen Charlotte, having been appointed "enamel and miniature painter to Her Majesty".

He was a member of the Incorporated Society of Artists, and in 1766 subscribed the declaration roll of that society. Having amassed a fortune sufficient to pay off the encumbrances on the old family estate, Finney retired to Fulshaw in 1769, became a Justice of the Peace, and devoted the remainder of his life to quelling the riots then so prevalent in that part of Cheshire, and to other local improvements. He also compiled a manuscript history of his family, part of which was printed in the first volume of the Cheshire and Lancashire Historical Collector.

A small portrait of Finney was later recorded in the possession of his descendant, a Mr. Jenkins of Fulshaw; it was engraved by William Ford of Manchester, and the plate was destroyed after twelve copies had been struck off.

He died in 1798, and was buried in Wilmslow. He was twice married, but left no children.
