= Dean Row Chapel =

Coordinates: 53.3306°N 2.1952°W

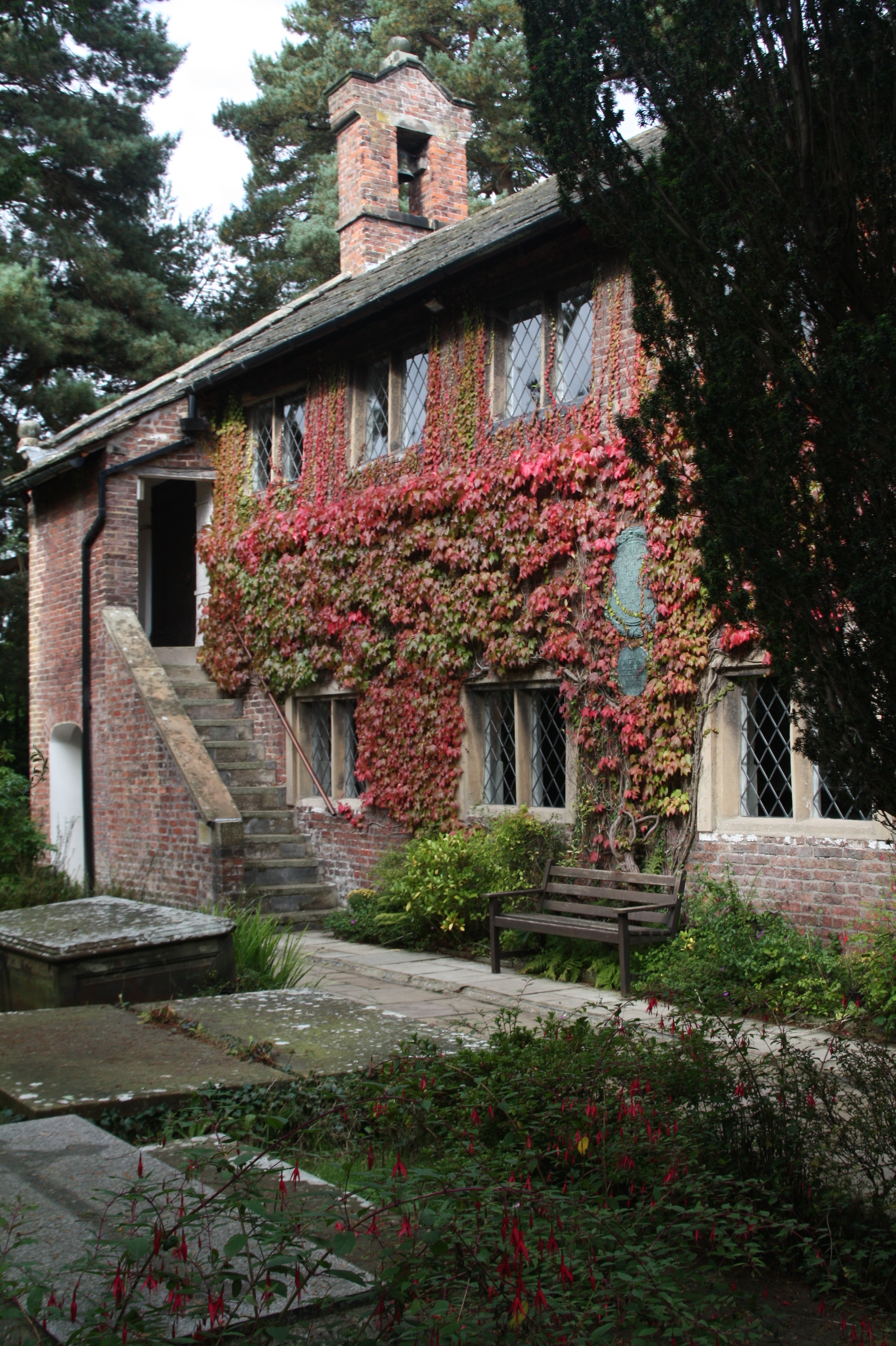
- Dean Row Chapel

- Location in Cheshire
- OS grid reference: SJ 871 815
- Location: Wilmslow, Cheshire
- Country: England
- Denomination: Unitarian
- Website: Dean Row Chapel

Architecture
- Functional status: Active
- Heritage designation: Grade II*
- Designated: 30 March 1951
- Architectural type: Chapel
- Groundbreaking: 1695

Specifications
- Materials: Red brick with sandstone dressings Kerridge slate roof with stone ridge

Dean Row Chapel is a Unitarian place of worship in Cheshire, North West England. It is located 2 miles (3 km) east of the town of Wilmslow, Cheshire, near the junction of the A5102 and B5358 roads. The structure is recorded in the National Heritage List for England as a designated Grade II* listed building. The congregation is a member of the General Assembly of Unitarian and Free Christian Churches, the umbrella organisation for British Unitarians.

== History ==
The chapel was built around the end of the 17th century soon after the passing of the Act of Toleration 1689. By 1843 it had become a ruin. It was restored but during the process many of the internal fittings and furniture were lost. The chapel was rededicated on 23 April 1845. A further restoration took place in 1971. Initially Presbyterian, it later became Unitarian and continues in use as a Unitarian chapel.

== Architecture ==
=== Exterior ===
The chapel is built in red brick with sandstone dressings and is in two storeys. The roof is of Kerridge slates with a stone ridge. The eastern gable is surmounted by a stone ball and the western gable has a bellcote with a single bell, and a stone ball on its top. Two external staircases lead to the upper storeys and under each staircase is a porch providing an entrance to the lower storey. At the lower level are four two-light chamfered stone mullioned windows, and at the upper level six similar windows. In the centre of the wall are bronze war memorial plaques.

=== Interior ===
At each end are galleries with the organ occupying the east gallery. The altar table is at the east end and is enclosed by a curved rail. Also at the east end is the three-level pulpit which was formerly on the north side. At the west end is a board containing the names of the past ministers.

== External features ==
In the graveyard is a sundial with three dials dating from 1871, which was restored for the 2000 millennium.

== Religious life ==
Two nearby Unitarian congregations are Chowbent Chapel and Cross Street Chapel.

== See also ==
- Grade II* listed buildings in Cheshire East
- Listed buildings in Wilmslow
