= Samuel Greg (junior) =

English industrialist and philanthropist

Samuel Greg (6 September 1804 – 14 May 1876) was an English industrialist and philanthropist.

Born in Manchester, the son of the elder Samuel Greg, the creator of Quarry Bank Mill, he was brother to William Rathbone Greg and Robert Hyde Greg. Influenced by the religious beliefs of his mother Hannah, he attended a Unitarian school in Nottingham. Further study in Bristol, under Lant Carpenter, and at the University of Edinburgh was interspersed with experience in the family firm and completed by the, then obligatory, Grand Tour.

Already more interested in the consequences of wealth rather than its creation, in 1830 and 1831 he gave lectures on scientific subjects to the workers at Quarry Bank. On his father's retirement in 1832, he took over management of Lowerhouse Mill in Bollington, Cheshire and used it as a basis for further social experimentation.

He published his ideas on the model factory village in Two Letters to Leonard Horner on the Capabilities of the Factory System (1840) and went on to found a number of educational and social institutions in Bollington. However, in 1847, he introduced new machinery in his mills which was so unpopular that it precipitated a strike.

In consequence, Greg suffered from a nervous breakdown and retired to his Bollington home, The Mount. Thereon, he restricted his philanthropy to scientific lectures for the workers of Macclesfield, becoming president of the Society for the Diffusion of Useful Knowledge.

Greg wrote the hymn Stay, Master, stay, based on the gospel story of the Transfiguration of Jesus.

Greg married Mary Priscilla Needham in 1838 and she had two sons and six daughters with him. He died in Bollington in 1876 after a long illness. His daughter Bertha married Hugh Ronalds, brother and business partner of Dr Edmund Ronalds. His son, Walter, was an early England rugby union international.

== Bibliography ==
- Rose, M.B. (1986) The Gregs of Quarry Bank Mill: The Rise and Decline of the Family Firm, 1750–1914 ISBN 0-521-32382-7
- Stanley, A.P. (ed.) (1877) A Layman's Legacy in Prose and Verse: Selections from the Papers of Samuel Greg with a biographical memoir
