= Styal =

Village in Cheshire, England

Coordinates: 53.3485°N 2.2485°W

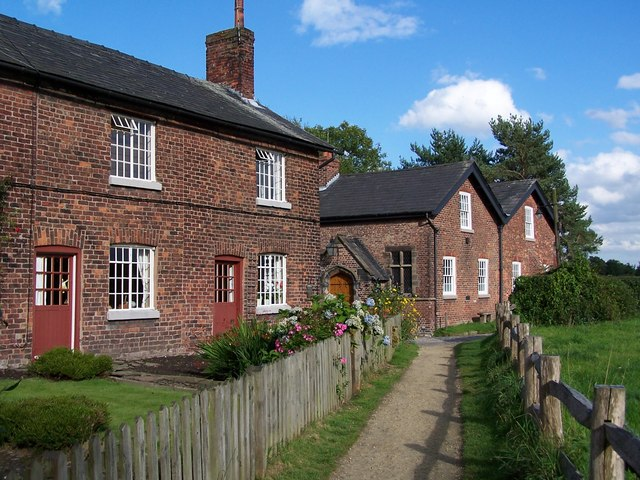
- Cottages in Styal village

- Location within Cheshire
- Area: 7.08 km^{2} (2.73 sq mi)
- Population: 1,051 (2011)
  - Density: 148/km^{2} (380/sq mi)
- OS grid reference: SJ835835
- Civil parish: Styal
- Unitary authority: Cheshire East
- Ceremonial county: Cheshire
- Region: North West
- Country: England
- Sovereign state: United Kingdom
- Post town: WILMSLOW
- Postcode district: SK9
- Dialling code: 01625
- Police: Cheshire
- Fire: Cheshire
- Ambulance: North West
- UK Parliament: Tatton

Styal (/staɪl/, like style) is a village and civil parish near the town of Wilmslow in Cheshire, England. The River Bollin runs through the parish.

== History ==
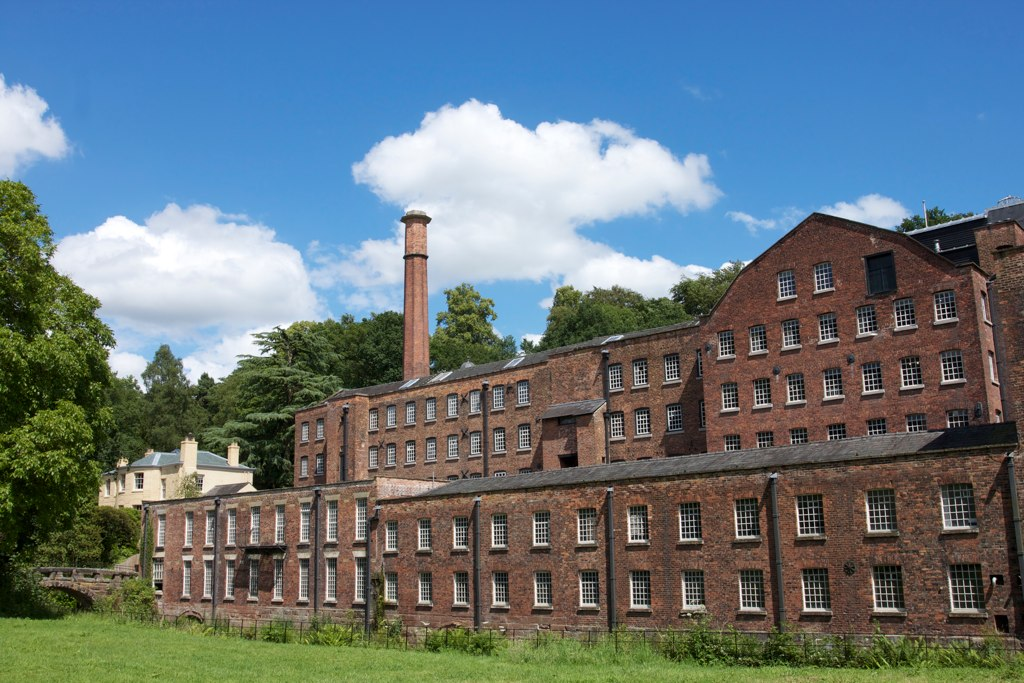
Quarry Bank Mill

Styal village grew during the early years of the Industrial Revolution when industrialist Samuel Greg built Quarry Bank Mill, a cotton mill and textile factory. The mill was situated on the bank of the River Bollin in order to use the water current to power the waterwheels. By the 1820s, the mill was expanding and, because of its rural location, Greg found the need to construct a new model village nearby to provide housing for his workers.

Samuel Greg died in 1834 and Quarry Bank Mill was taken over by his son, Robert Hyde Greg, who remained in charge for nearly 40 years; he introduced a number of technological innovations. Ownership of the mill subsequently passed through several generations of the Greg Family. The mill ceased operation as a working factory in 1959.

In 1898, the Styal Cottage Homes were opened to house destitute children from the Manchester area; it closed in 1956. Today, the former buildings are occupied by the HMP Styal women's prison, which opened in 1962.

== Landmarks ==
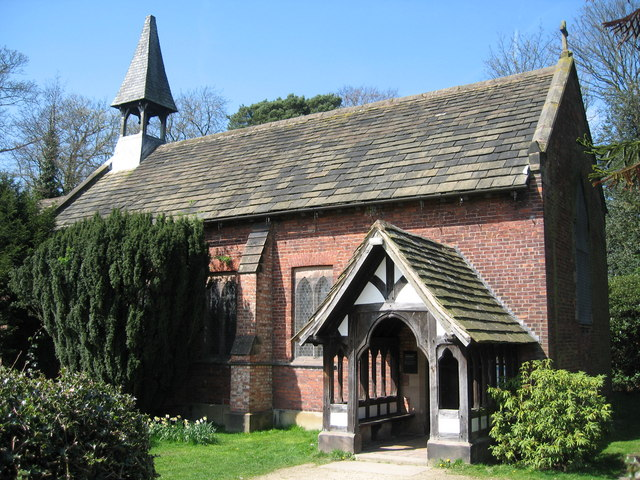
Norcliffe Chapel

Quarry Bank Mill and its village still stand today; it is now owned by National Trust, which operates it as an industrial heritage museum.

The mill and its surrounding buildings are recorded in the National Heritage List for England as a designated Grade II* listed building.

Quarry Bank Mill has been recognised internationally as a significant industrial heritage site; it has been included on the European Route of Industrial Heritage by the European Union's Creative Europe programme, which records the mill, with Styal village, as "The most complete and least altered factory colony of the Industrial Revolution. It is of outstanding national and international importance."

Norcliffe Chapel, a small Grade II-listed Unitarian chapel, stands close to the mill village. It was built in 1822–23 to provide a place of worship for the mill workers and is now in the ownership of the National Trust. It was originally established as a Baptist chapel, but was changed to a Unitarian church by Samuel Greg, himself a Unitarian, in 1833.

The Greg family were influential landowners in the area and, in 1831, Robert Hyde Greg commissioned the construction of a large new home, Norcliffe Hall, to the west of the village. Today, the Grade II-listed building is occupied by private flats.

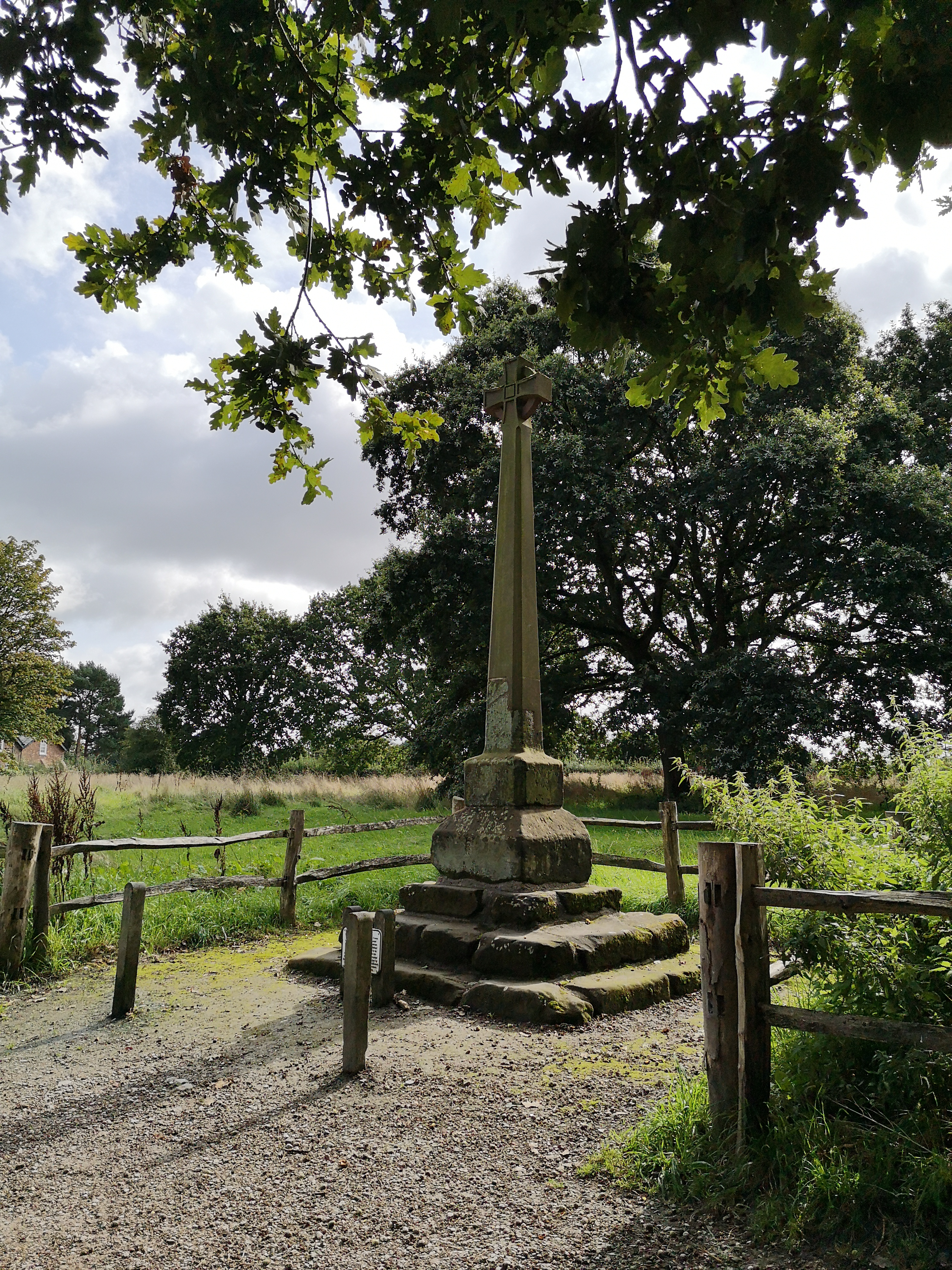
Styal Cross, which was restored in 2010

Near to Norcliffe chapel stands the Grade II-listed Styal Cross, a wayside cross of medieval origin. The cross had originally stood at Cross Farm. In 1860, it was relocated by the son of Samuel Greg, Robert Hyde Greg, to Holly Lane. In 1980, it was demolished by a car crash. The remains of the lower part were rebuilt on the lane close to Styal in 1983 and, after a fundraising campaign, a replacement stone column and cross were added to the medieval base in 2010.

== Amenities ==
Styal Primary School serves the village and is located on Altrincham Road, to the west.

The village is home to several sports clubs; they include Styal Cricket Club, Styal Golf Club, Wilmslow Albion Football Club, Wilmslow Hockey Club and Wilmslow Lacrosse Club.

== Demography ==
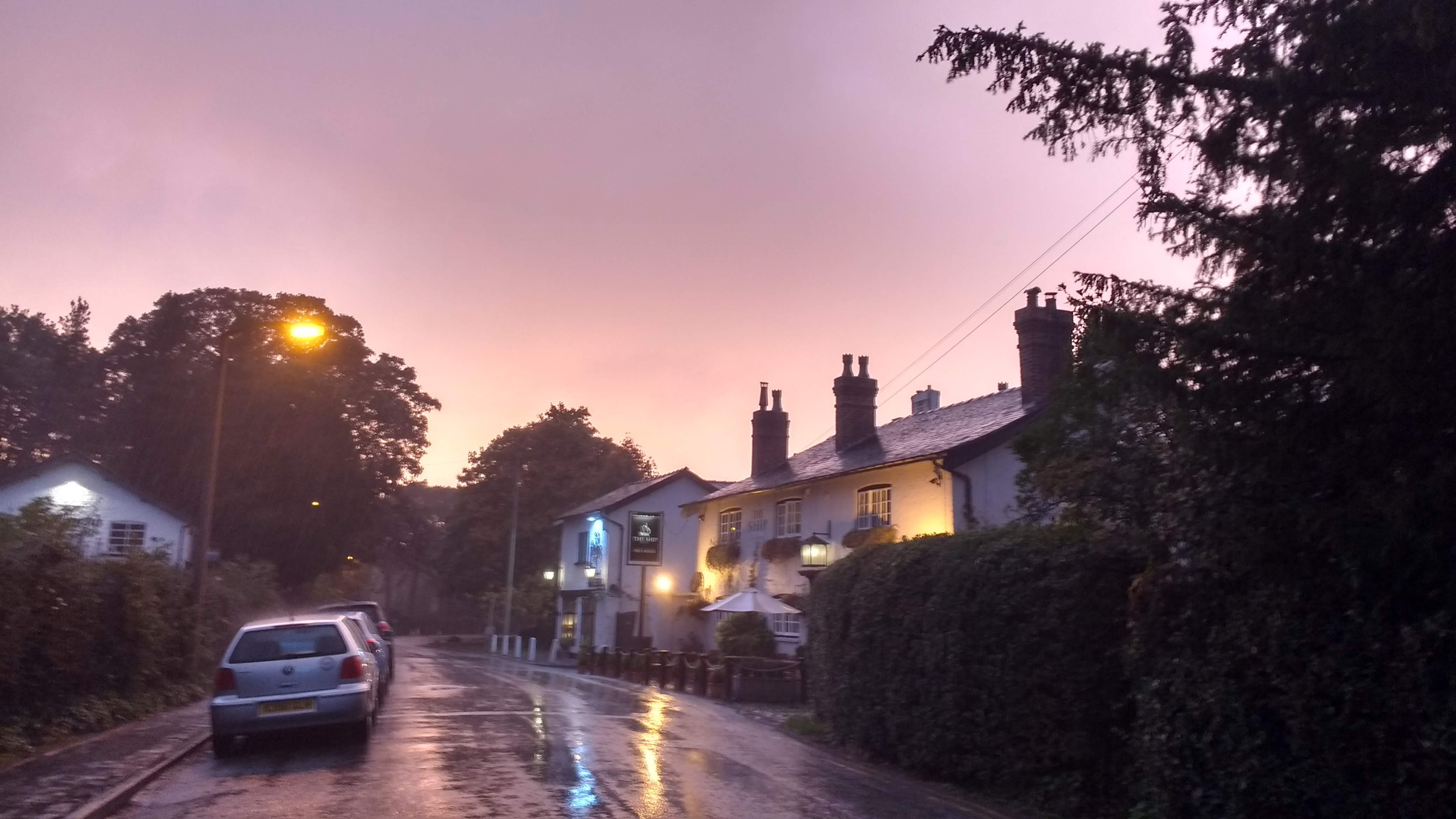
Altrincham Road in Styal

=== Population ===
The population in the 2001 Census was 5,014, including the nearby smaller village of Morley and part of the fringe of Wilmslow. The population for the civil parish according to the 2011 Census was 1,051.

According to 2001 Census data, the Morley and Styal Ward has a population of 5,014, of which 2,722 (54.3%) were females and 2,292 (45.7%) were males. 949 people (18.93%) were aged 16 and under, and 969 people (19.33%) were aged 65 and over.

Morley & Styal Compared
2001 UK Census	Morley & Styal	Cheshire	England
Total population	5,014	673,781	49,138,831
White	96.2%	98.4%	90.9%
Asian	1.3%	0.5%	4.6%
Black	0.5%	0.2%	2.3%

=== Ethnicity ===
Ethnic white groups (British, Irish and other) account for 96.19% (4,823 people) of the population, with 3.81% (190 people) being in ethnic groups other than white.

Of the 3.81% (190 people) in non-white ethnic groups:

- 53 (27.89%) belonged to mixed ethnic groups
- 67 (35.26%) were Asian or Asian British
- 25 (13.16%) were Black or Black British
- 45 (23.64%) were Chinese or Other Ethnic Groups

=== Religion ===
A breakdown of religious groups and denominations:

- Christian – 76.31% (3,826 people)
- Buddhist – 0.24% (12 people)
- Hindu – 0.50% (25 people)
- Jewish – 0.76% (38 people)
- Muslim – 1.18% (59 people)
- Sikh – 0.18% (9 people)
- Sivesh – 0.02% (1 person)
- Other religions – 0.26% (13 people)
- No religion – 13.82% (693 people)
- Religion not stated – 6.76% (339 people)

== Transport ==
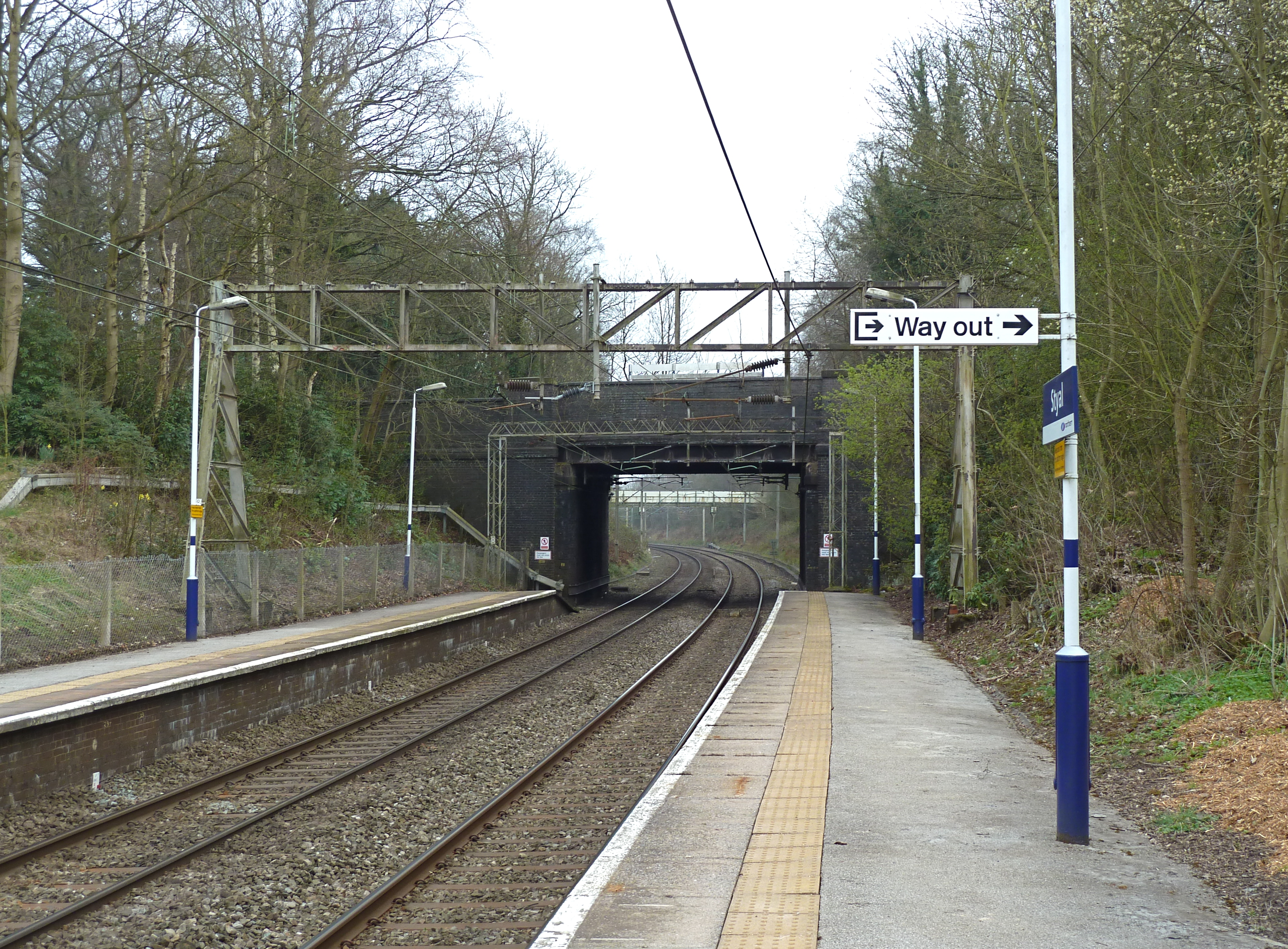
Styal station, looking southbound towards Wilmslow

Styal railway station is a stop on the Styal Line, which connects Manchester Piccadilly, Manchester Airport and Wilmslow. Northern Trains operates the following service pattern:

- The Monday-Saturday service pattern consists of one train per hour in each direction between Crewe and Manchester Piccadilly, via Manchester Airport.
- On evenings and Sundays, there is an hourly service each way between Liverpool Lime Street and Wilmslow, via Manchester Piccadilly and Manchester Airport.

No bus services currently serve the village. The nearest services can be at sourced at nearby Heald Green and Wilmslow.

The village is bisected north-south by the B5166 Styal Road, which connects Northenden, Heald Green and Wilmslow. The A555 Manchester Airport Eastern Link passes west-east 1 mi (1.5 km) to the north of the village, linking Manchester Airport with Hazel Grove.

== Notable people ==
- Tyson Fury (born 1988), professional boxer. Grew up in Styal.
- Terry Waite (born 1939), humanitarian, author, and hostage negotiator. Grew up in Styal.

== See also ==
- Listed buildings in Wilmslow
- Styal Cottage Homes
