= Robert Hyde Greg =

English industrialist, economist, antiquary and Member of Parliament

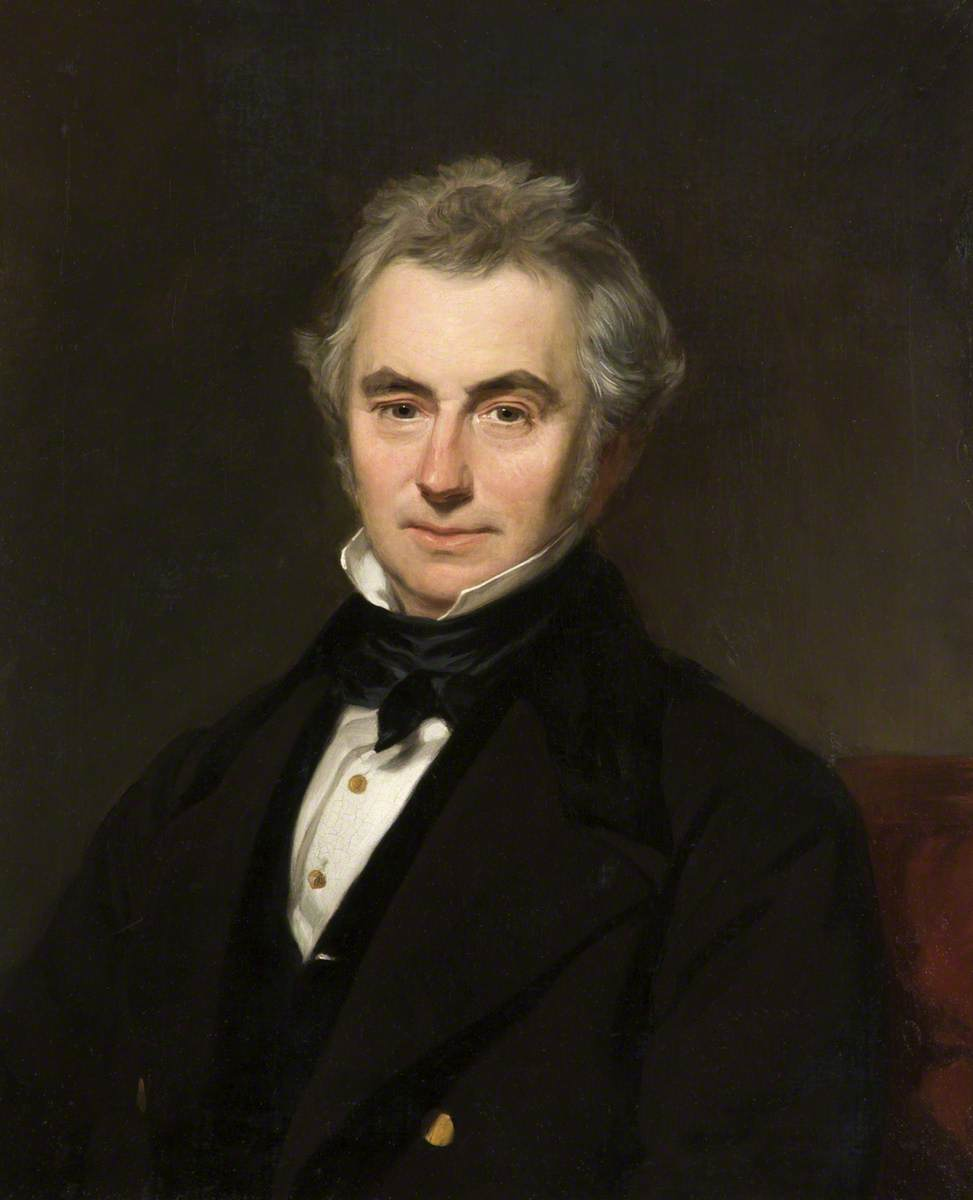
Robert Hyde Greg, portrait c.1845

Robert Hyde Greg (24 September 1795 – 21 February 1875), was an English industrialist, economist, antiquary, and briefly a Member of Parliament.

Born in Manchester, he was the son of Samuel Greg and Hannah Lightbody, the creators of Quarry Bank Mill, a pioneering factory of the early Industrial Revolution. His family were Unitarians, part of the prosperous dissenting community that characterised the entrepreneurial class of factory owners. He was brother to William Rathbone Greg and the junior Samuel Greg. He attended the University of Edinburgh and, after the obligatory Grand Tour of the antiquities of Continental Europe, joined his father's textile manufacturing enterprise.

He was active in the city's intellectual life being elected to membership of the Manchester Literary and Philosophical Society on 24 January, 1817 and was a founder of the Manchester Mechanics' Institute.

He was an active member of the Liberal Party and the Anti-Corn Law League. Though he was elected to Parliament for Manchester in 1839, it was without his consent and he resigned in the following year. He was an opponent of factory reform, trades unions and worker health and safety legislation.

He died at Norcliffe Hall, Styal, Cheshire and is buried at the Dean Row Unitarian Chapel, Wilmslow.

Greg was also a slaveholder; tenant-in-common of Cane Garden, St Vincent Island, with 82 enslaved people.

Parliament of the United Kingdom
Preceded by Mark Philips and Charles Poulett Thomson	Member of Parliament for Manchester; 1839 – 1841; With: Mark Philips	Succeeded by Mark Philips and Thomas Milner Gibson
