= Samuel Greg =

Irish-born businessman and industrialist (1758–1834)

- c. 1820 portrait
- Born: 26 March 1758; Belfast, Ireland
- Died: 4 June 1834 (aged 76); Styal, Cheshire
- Education: Harrow School
- Occupations: Businessman, industrialist
- Known for: Quarry Bank Mill, Styal, Cheshire
- Spouse: Hannah Lightbody
- Children: Robert Hyde Greg; John Greg; Samuel Greg Jr.; William Rathbone Greg; Elizabeth Greg Rathbone

Samuel Greg (26 March 1758 – 4 June 1834) was an Irish-born businessman and industrialist of the Industrial Revolution and a pioneer of the factory system. Born in Belfast, Ireland, he moved to England and built Quarry Bank Mill in Styal, Cheshire, which at his retirement was the largest textile mill in the country. He and his wife Hannah Greg assumed welfare responsibilities for their employees, many of whom were children, building a model village alongside the factory. At the same time, Greg inherited and operated a slave plantation in the West Indies.

== Atlantic-trading Belfast family ==
Greg was born in Belfast, Ireland, the second son, and one of thirteen children, born to Elizabeth (Hyde) (1721–1780) and Thomas Greg of Belfast (1718 – 1796). With his business partner and brother-in-law, Waddell Cunningham, Thomas Greg commanded one of the greatest mercantile fortunes in Ireland.

The son of a Scottish blacksmith, in the 1740s Thomas Greg bought a small ship which carried salted provisions, linen and butter to the West Indies and returned with flaxseed. Dealings in New York brought him into contact and partnership with Waddell Cunningham, another Belfast Presbyterian. By 1775 Greg and Cunningham was one of the largest shipping companies in New York, having benefitted from the rise in the prices of provisions during the Seven Years’ War, a licence to attack enemy and plunder enemy vessels, and the opportunity to smuggle to the embargoed French colonies. After the war, Greg and Cunningham set up a sugar plantation on Dominica called "Belfast" for which Thomas Greg's brother John, already established on the island, supplied slaves via the Atlantic slave trade.

At home, as Belfast's richest merchants, the partners played a leading role in improving the town's port and commercial infrastructure, including construction of the White Linen Hall which attracted the linen trade from the north of Ireland that had formerly gone through Dublin.

At the age of eight, Samuel Greg was sent to live with his maternal uncle, Robert Hyde, at Ardwick Hall, Manchester, in the heart of England. His uncles, Robert and Nathaniel, were linen merchants and, after completing his education at Harrow School, near London, Samuel joined their business in 1778.

== Marriage to Hannah Lightbody ==
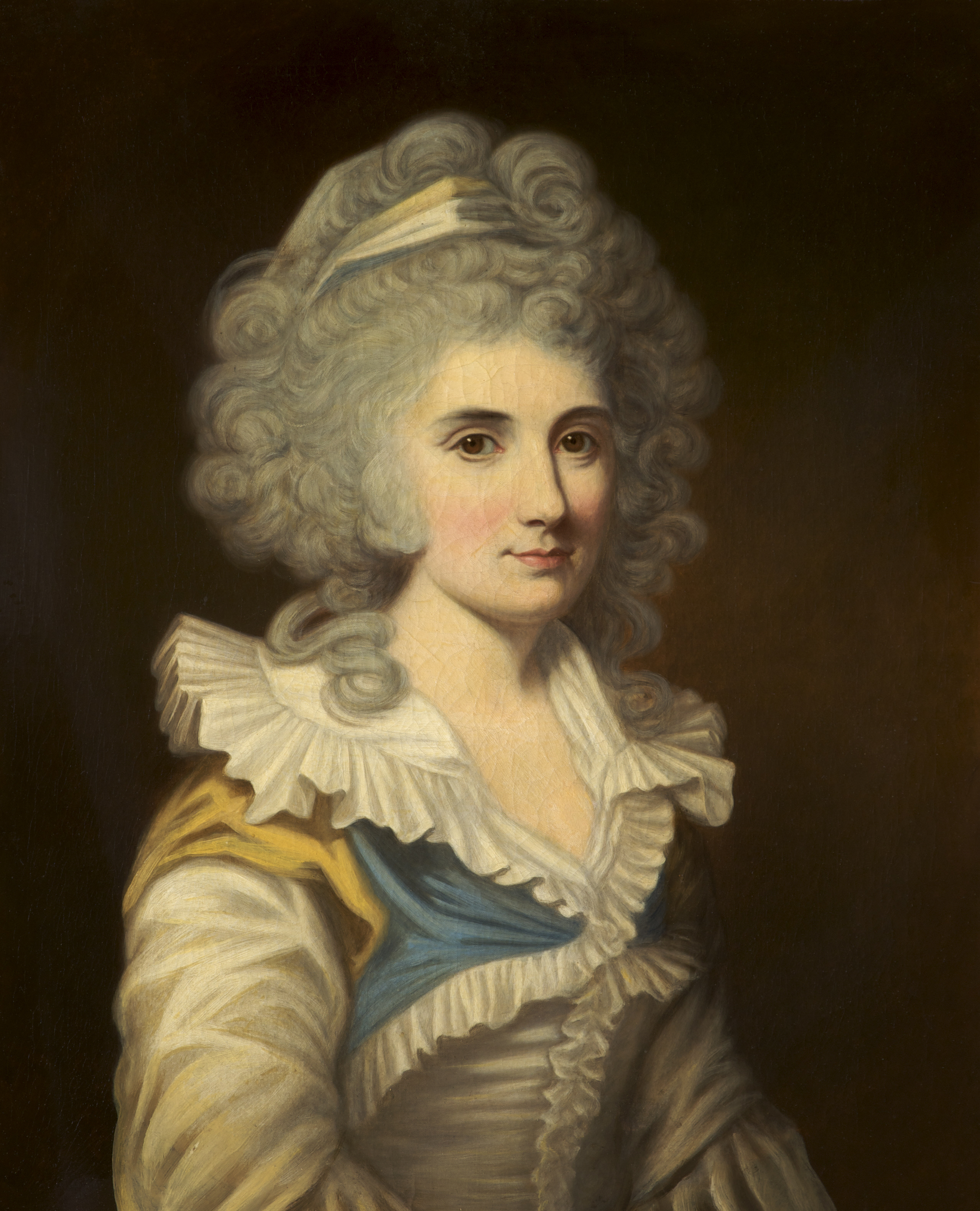
Hannah Greg (née Lightbody)

In 1789 Greg married Hannah Lightbody (1766–1828), the daughter of a wealthy Liverpool merchant. At Cross Street Chapel, Hannah introduced Samuel (raised Presbyterian) to Unitarianism, a latitudinarian faith indulgent of "rational dissent". The new church was also his introduction to an influential network of Manchester and Liverpool trading and banking families. Greg was active as a member of the Manchester Literary and Philosophical Society.

Hannah had completed her education at a Unitarian academy at Stoke Newington outside London, where she lived with her cousin Thomas Rogers, a close friend and an immediate neighbour to Richard Price. Richard Price was the "non-conforming minister of eminence" that Edmund Burke pilloried in his Reflections on the Revolution in France (1790) as the leading light of a circle of "literary caballers and intriguing philosophers" naïve and seditious in their embrace of the French revolutionary doctrine. It was in this same circle that Samuel's older sister Jane Greg moved, associating with John Horne Tooke of the London Corresponding Society (arrested, but acquitted, in 1794 of high treason) and Irish radical Roger O'Connor. Although the extent of her activities are unclear, in suppressing the Society of United Irishmen in advance of their republican insurrection in 1798, British commander Gerard Lake described Jane Greg as "the most violent creature possible" and as someone who had caused "very great [political] mischief" in her native Belfast.

Hannah's religious and social views are credited with influencing Samuel's approach to the workers' welfare. A former director of the Quarry Bank Mill, and author of a book about Hannah Greg, provided this summary of her philosophy and work.

She was liberal and compassionate by nature, and all her friends were active campaigners to stop the slave trade and to move forward the emancipation of the slaves in the West Indies and America ... In reality, Hannah Greg did not say anything publicly about this because, apart from anything else, Samuel Greg inherited slave plantations. She couldn’t be a public hypocrite so she kept quiet.

== Paternalistic employer ==
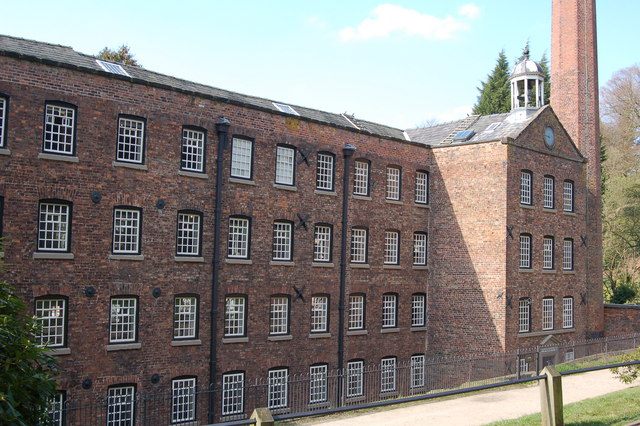
Quarry Bank Mill

With the death of Robert Hyde in 1782, Greg took over his uncle's interests in Manchester. Convinced of the prospects for mechanised textile production and the latest developments in water and steam power, Greg invested his wife's £10,000 dowry in building the Quarry Bank Mill in Styal on the bank of the River Bollin in Cheshire. The difficulty, in the rural setting, was labour. Hannah Greg's influence has been seen in what might otherwise be seen as a hard-headed, if unusual, decision to invest in improved conditions so as to make the new and regimented mill work attractive. In Styal Greg developed what came to be considered a "model village". Each family (average of eight people per family) had a cottage built offering a parlour, a kitchen, two bedrooms, a cistern, a backyard and a good-sized vegetable garden.

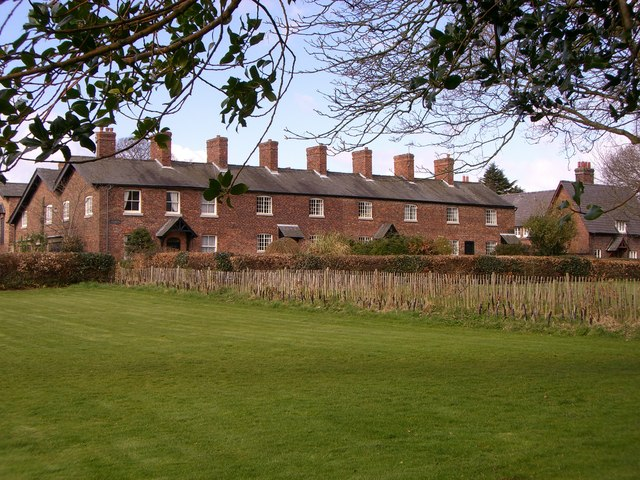
Some of the houses built by Greg for mill workers

This alone was not sufficient: from 1790 operations were relying upon children—half the workforce. Factory owners, like Greg, were paid between £2 and £4 for each workhouse child they employed. The children, housed in an Apprentice House, received their board and lodging, and two pence a week. The younger children worked as scavengers and piecers, but after a couple of years at Styal they were allowed to become involved in spinning and carding. Some of the more older boys became skilled mechanics. The arrangement was still operating in 1835 when Andrew Ure observed "at a little distance from the factory, on a sunny bank, stands a handsome house, two stories high, built for the accommodation of the female apprentices. They are well fed, clothed and educated. The apprentices have milk-porridge for breakfast, potatoes and bacon for dinner, and meat on Sundays".

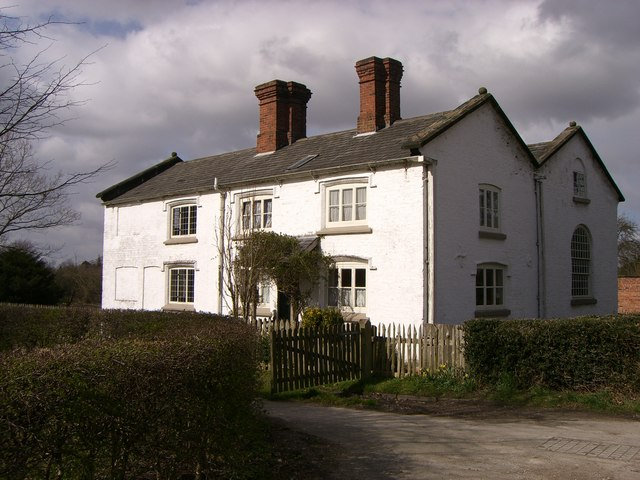
The Apprentice House for child apprentices, built in 1790

A former director of the Quarry Bank Mill, and author of a book about Hannah Greg, provided this summary of child labour at the mill, based on extensive research.

Over half of Samuel Greg’s workforce were poor and orphaned children ... the children were given good medical care by the Greg family doctor, and education in writing and maths three nights a week ... although the child workers were not subjected to corporal punishment, bad behaviour brought overtime, threats that girls would have their heads shaved or young workers being locked in a room for days on a porridge-only diet".

The children were overseen by Hannah Greg, who delivered the services of a doctor, two teachers and two singing masters. After the children's thirteen-hour shift, Hannah provided them with lessons in reading, writing and arithmetic. When she was in Styal she delivered the lessons to the girls, and preached to them on Sundays.[18] The Greg children, of which she and Samuel had thirteen, were expected to take part in the teaching. It was part of her dissenting belief that people should mix together, be frugal and accept their responsibilities to others.

By 1816 Quarry Bank employed 252 people and was producing 342,578 pounds of cotton cloth. Ten years later, the mill was employing 380 and output had reached 699,223 pounds. As well as taking a large share of the home market, Samuel Greg was also selling cloth to Italy, France, North America, Russia, Germany and South America. The success of Quarry Bank Mill encouraged Greg to open mills at Caton (150 workers), Lancaster (560 workers), Bury (544 workers), Bollington (450 workers). By 1831 Samuel Greg & Company, in which the engineer Peter Ewart and Greg's four sons were partners, owned five factories, over 4,000 power looms, employed over 2,000 people and turned four million pounds of cotton into cloth. Overall, Samuel Greg & Company was producing 0.6% of all yarn and 1.03% of all cloth produced in Britain.

== Slave owner ==
The Styal community was not the model for all Greg's operations, and it is clear that there were limits to his relative beneficence as an employer. In 1795, with his brother Thomas, Samuel Greg had inherited, and continued to operate as a slave plantation, the Hillsborough Estate on the West Indian island of Dominica, from his paternal uncle John Greg. The Gregs supplied the enslaved Africans on the estate with clothing and blankets made at Quarry Bank Mill.

There were of 71 male slaves and 68 female slaves on the Hillsborough Estate when, in January 1814, twenty absconded. They were recaptured and punished with 100 lashes for the males and 50 lashes for the females.

In September 2020, the National Trust, (owner of Quarry Bank Mill and Styal Estate), provided this concise summary of the family's involvement with the slave trade: the mill "was built using family wealth related to slavery". "Samuel Greg ... his father Thomas and uncle John had interests in four estates in Dominica and St Vincent, ... while Samuel and his brother Thomas inherited the Hillsborough plantation in Dominica and other estates".

In 2020, the National Trust was working on a plan to include displays about the original owners' links to colonialism and slavery in the Americas.

== Heirs ==
In 1832, Greg was attacked by a stag in the grounds of Quarry Bank Mill. The injury led to his retirement. By this time, it had become the largest spinning and weaving business in the United Kingdom. Greg never recovered from the attack and died two years later.

Of Hannah and Samuel's thirteen children Robert Hyde Greg continued in the textile business and became a Member of Parliament for Manchester in 1839 opposed to extension of the franchise and to factory legislation; Samuel Rathbone Greg had little inclination for business and developed a career as a writer and critic publishing in 1840 Past and Present Efforts for the Extinction of the African Slave Trade in which he argued that cotton, sugar and coffee could be grown more cheaply by free labour; Elizabeth Greg (married to William Rathbone V) founded the first public wash-houses in the United Kingdom in the wake of the 1832 cholera epidemic, and later helped William Forster in formulating the Elementary Education Act 1870. Ellen Maria married George Melly and he and their daughter Florence Melly took an interest in improving education.

The estate and mill were eventually inherited by Robert Hyde Greg and then by Alexander Carlton Greg, who donated the site in 1939 to the National Trust.

== Bibliography ==
- Rose, M.B. (1986) The Gregs of Quarry Bank Mill: The Rise and Decline of the Family Firm, 1750–1914
