= Quarry Bank Mill =

Preserved textile mill in Cheshire, England

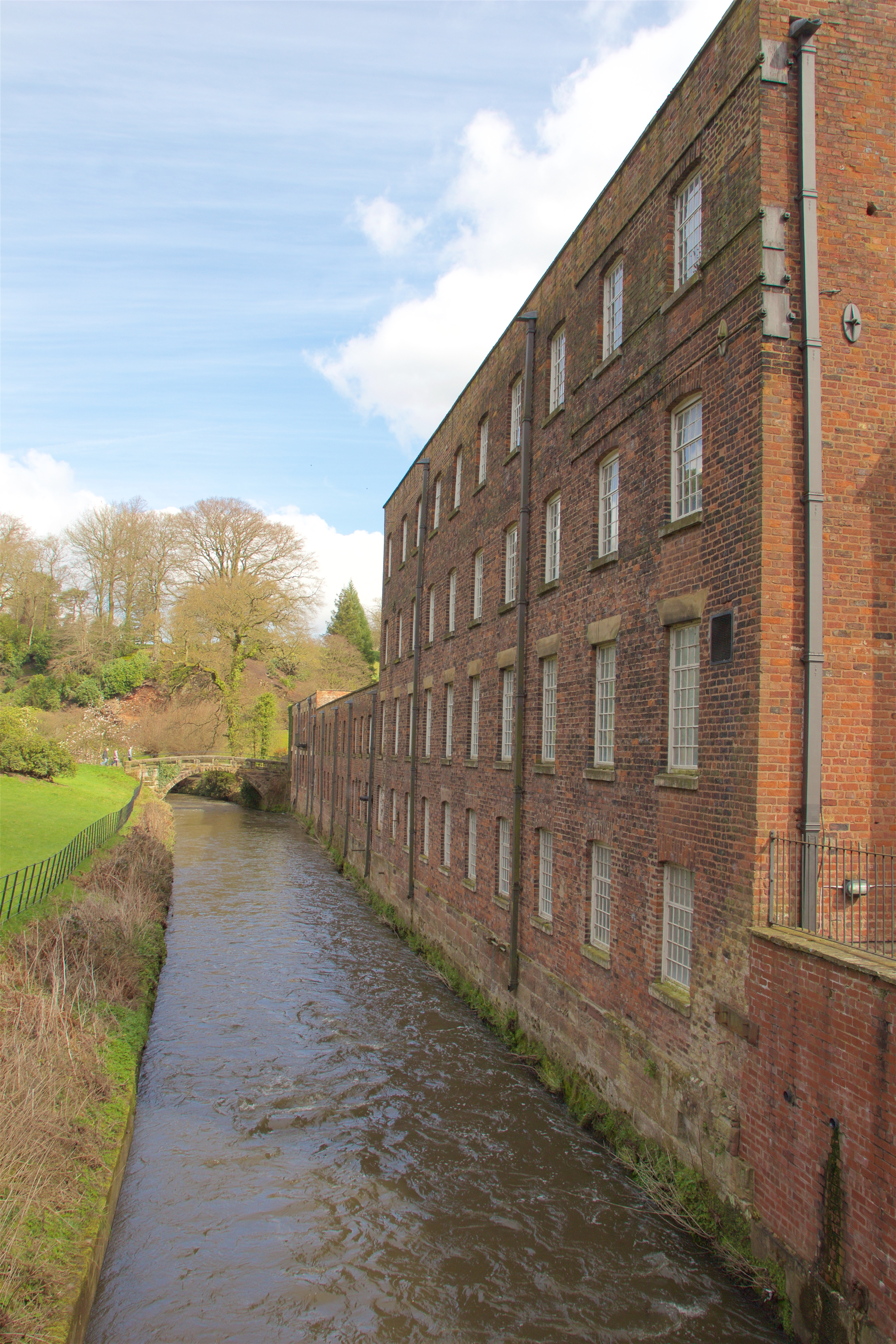
- Owner: Samuel Greg
- Further ownership: National Trust (1939)
- Coordinates: 53°20′38″N 2°14′58″W

Construction
- Built: 1784
- Renovated: 1796, 1817–1821
- Floor count: 5

Power
- Date: 1796, 1810
- Engine maker: Boulton & Watt

Water Power
- Diameter / width of water wheel: 32 feet (9.8 m) / 21 feet (6.4 m)

Equipment
- Mule Frames

Listed Building – Grade II*
- Official name: Quarry Bank Mill
- Designated: 30 March 1951
- Reference no.: 1237687

Quarry Bank Mill (also known as Styal Mill) in Styal, Cheshire, England, is one of the best preserved textile factories of the Industrial Revolution. Built in 1784, the cotton mill is recorded in the National Heritage List for England as a designated Grade II* listed building. Quarry Bank Mill was established by Samuel Greg, and was notable for innovations both in machinery and also in its approach to labour relations, the latter largely as a result of the work of Greg's wife Hannah Lightbody. The family took a somewhat paternalistic attitude toward the workers, providing medical care for all and limited education to the children, but all laboured roughly 72 hours per week until 1847 when a new law shortened the hours.

Greg also built housing for all of his workers in a large community now known as Styal Estate. Some were conversions of farm houses or older residences, but 42 new cottages including the Oak Cottages (now Grade II Listed) were built in the 1820s when the mill was being expanded.

The National Trust, which runs the mill and Styal Estate as a museum that is open to the public, calls the site "one of Britain's greatest industrial heritage sites, home to a complete industrial community". According to the Council of Europe, the mill with Styal village make up "the most complete and least altered factory colony of the Industrial Revolution. It is of outstanding national and international importance".

== Location ==
Quarry Bank Mill is on the outskirts of Styal in Cheshire, abutting and to the south of Manchester Airport. The mill is on the bank of the River Bollin, which provided water to power the waterwheels. It was connected by road to the Bridgewater Canal for transporting raw cotton from the port of Liverpool. The site consisted of three farms or folds. Styal railway station opened in 1909, about a 1/3 mile (0.54 km) away.

== History ==
Samuel Greg leased land at Quarrell Hole on Pownall Fee from Lord Stamford, who imposed a condition that "none of the surrounding trees should be pruned, felled or lopped", maintaining the woodland character of the area. One reason for selecting this location was the "suitable head of water provided by the River Bollin and its proximity to the Bridgewater Canal and thus Liverpool". The factory was built in 1784 by Greg to spin cotton. When Greg retired in 1832, it was the largest such business in the United Kingdom. The water-powered Georgian mill still produces cotton calico. The Gregs were careful and pragmatic, paternalistic mill owners, and the mill underwent expansion and change throughout its history. When Greg's son, Robert Hyde Greg, took over the business, he introduced weaving. Samuel Greg died in 1834.

An 1835 report provided these specifics about the mill: "It is driven by an elegant water-wheel, thirty-two feet in diameter, and twenty-four feet broad, equivalent in power to one hundred and twenty horses"

The Mill was attacked during the Plug Plot riots on 10 August 1842.

The mill's iron water wheel, the fourth to be installed, was designed by Thomas Hewes and built between 1816 and 1820. Overhead shafts above the machines were attached to the water wheel by a belt. When the wheel turned, the motion moved the belt and powered the machinery. A beam engine and a horizontal steam engine were subsequently installed to supplement the power. The Hewes wheel broke in 1904 but the River Bollin continued to power the mill through two water turbines. The mill owners purchased a Boulton and Watt steam engine in 1810 and a few years later acquired another, as the river's water level was often low in the summer, which could interrupt cloth production for several years. Steam engines could produce power all year round. Today the mill houses the most powerful working waterwheel in Europe, an iron wheel moved from Glasshouses Mill at Pateley Bridge designed by Sir William Fairbairn who had been Hewes' apprentice.

=== Mill community ===
The sparse accommodation that existed when the Gregs built the mill was soon exhausted, and Greg built plain cottages, including the Oak Cottages, which are now Grade II listed; these were rented to his workers. Each house had a parlour, kitchen and two bedrooms (a two-up two-down), an outside privy and a small garden. Rent was deducted from the workers' wages. The area of worker housing became known as Styal Estate.

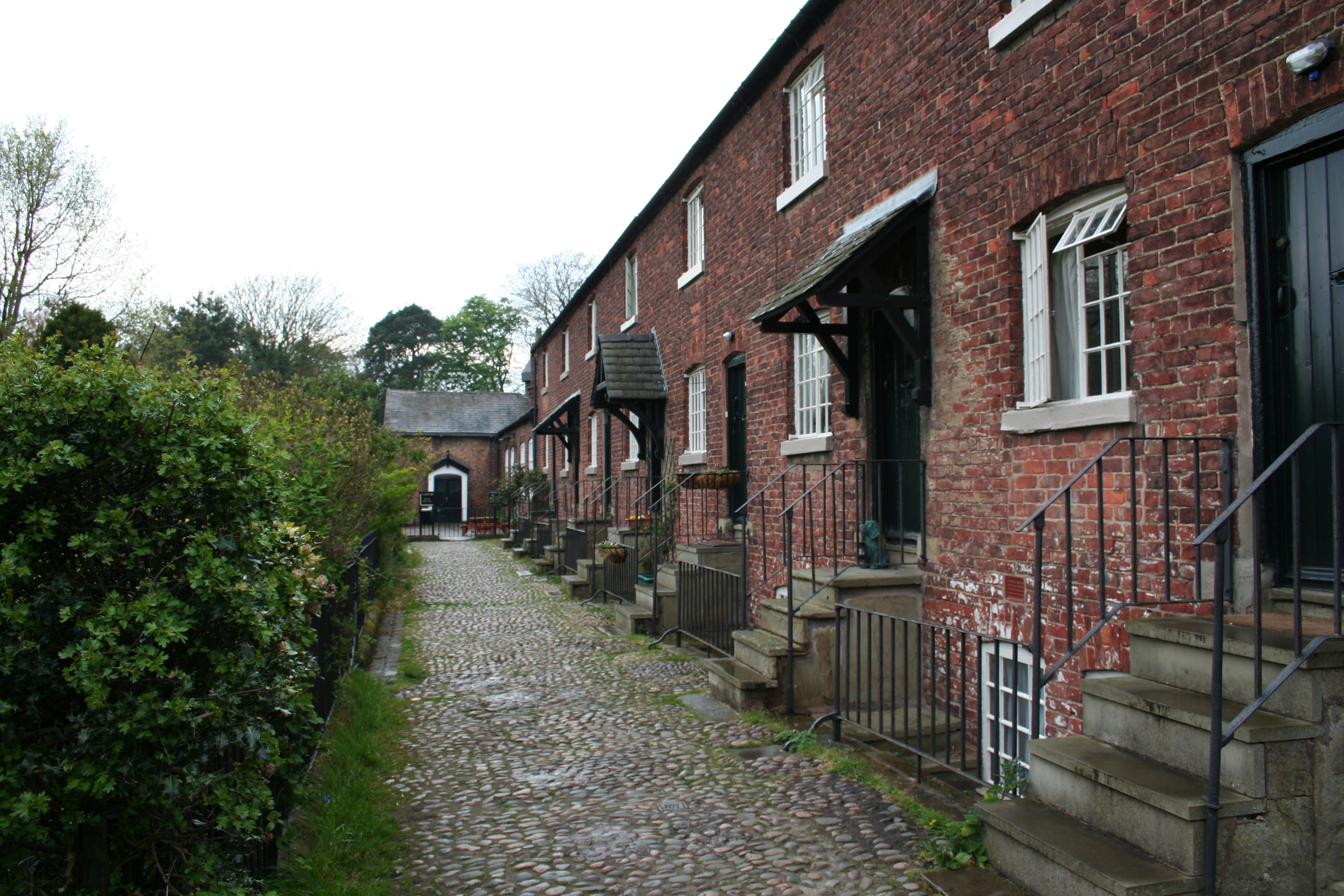
Part of the Oak Cottages at Styal

The Gregs owned a home in Manchester but also built a home near the mill in 1797, called "Quarry Bank House". The building has been Grade II listed since 1975. It was restored in 2017 in a manner that ensured that "all primary features dating from the Greg family’s occupation have been retained", and was opened to visits by the public by the National Trust.

Samuel Greg, like Robert Owen, who built New Lanark, attempted to bring the structured order of a country village to his new industrial centres. He built Oak School to educate the children and the Norcliffe Chapel where the villagers worshipped and held a Sunday school.

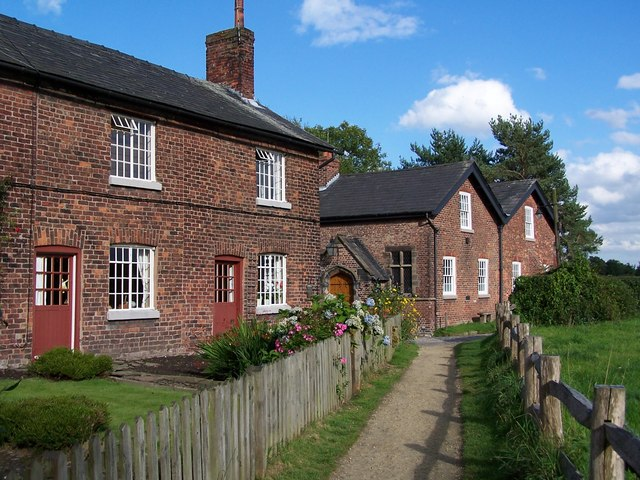
Workers' cottages at Styal Estate

At first, Greg converted farm buildings in Styal to house workers. As the mill increased in size, new housing was constructed for the workers. According to the National Trust, in the 1820s, "... new terraced cottages brought a brand new style of architecture and an expanding population ... In the tiny two-up-two-down cottages workers lived in cramped conditions, with as many as 14 people living in one house and tenants sub-letting rooms to other mill workers".

The Gregs also built the village shop and, for roughly five decades, remained the owners.

Medical care for mill workers was provided by staff physicians and surgeons. The mill provided the "earliest recorded occupational health service in this country", according to an article in the British Journal of Industrial Medicine.

=== Apprentice system ===
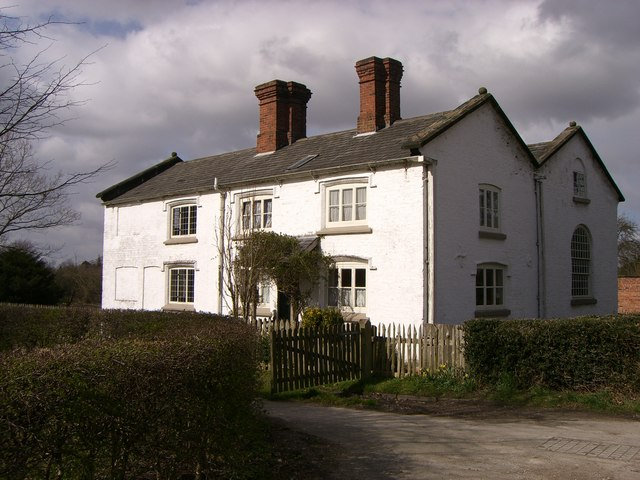
The Apprentice House where up to 90 children lived

Quarry Bank Mill employed child apprentices, a system that continued only until 1847. Most were children of families in poverty, living in workhouses, which sent them to the mill which was "clamouring for cheap labour". At the time, the consensus was that the children were better off in labour than they would have been under 'the step-motherly care of the Poor Law'", according to a reliable source. Initially, the children were brought from Hackney and Chelsea but by 1834 they came mostly from neighbouring parishes or Liverpool poorhouses.

The last child to be indentured started work in 1841. Child labour constituted over half of the labour force in the early decades of the mill's operation, according to Prof Hannah Barker, chair of Manchester Histories at the University of Manchester. "By 1833 apprentices made up only 20% of workforce at Styal, and in 1847 the apprentice system was completely abandoned".

The first children apprentices lived in lodgings in the neighbourhood, then in 1790 Greg built the Apprentice House near the factory. Greg believed he could get the best out of his workers by treating them fairly. He hired a superintendent to attend to their care and morals, and members of the Greg family and external tutors gave them lessons.

Some of the work was dangerous, with fingers sometimes being severed by the machines. Samuel Greg employed Peter Holland, father of the Royal Physician Sir Henry Holland, 1st Baronet and uncle of Elizabeth Gaskell, as mill doctor. Holland was responsible for the health of the children and other workers, and was the first doctor to be employed in such a capacity.

Life for the children was not ideal, of course. Hours were long: 12 hours per day, six days a week, according to documents from 1794. Time for play was allowed only on Sunday afternoons. Still, their "diet appears to have been a relatively good one", according to Professor Barker's research, and some education was provided. (The Gregs were Unitarians who believed in educating their workers, including Sunday School for both sexes.) Initially, schooling was provided only for boys, for an hour on three evenings of the week, at most; by 1833 the mill claimed that girls were also getting some education on Sunday afternoons. A comparative study of child mill workers of the era by Katrina Honeyman indicated that "those at Quarry Bank were treated 'better than average', but that the Gregs were not amongst the best employers in the country".

A former director of the Quarry Bank Mill, and author of a book about Hannah Greg, provided this summary of child labour, based on extensive research.

Over half of Samuel Greg’s workforce were poor and orphaned children ... the children were given good medical care by the Greg family doctor, and education in writing and maths three nights a week ... although the child workers were not subjected to corporal punishment, bad behaviour brought overtime, threats that girls would have their heads shaved or young workers being locked in a room for days on a porridge-only diet".

=== 20th and 21st century ===
The estate and mill were eventually inherited by Robert Hyde Greg and then by Alexander Carlton Greg, who donated the site in 1939 to the National Trust. The mill continued in production until 1959. According to the historic listing, the 32-foot (9.8 m) diameter waterwheel was replaced by two turbines in 1904. Some restoration was completed in 1969.

In 2006, the National Trust acquired Quarry Bank House and its gardens, and in 2010 the gardener's house and the upper gardens. In 2013 the mill received 130,000 visitors. In 2013, the trust launched an appeal to raise £1.4 million to restore a worker's cottage, a shop and the Greg's glasshouses and digitise records relating to Gregs and the mill workers.

During 2015–2020, the Quarry Bank Project improved the site for visitors with a £9.4 million restoration. "New areas have been restored and for the first time ever visitors can now explore the complete industrial heritage site at Quarry Bank". A promotional video published by the Trust depicts scenes and activities that visitors can experience.

== Architecture ==
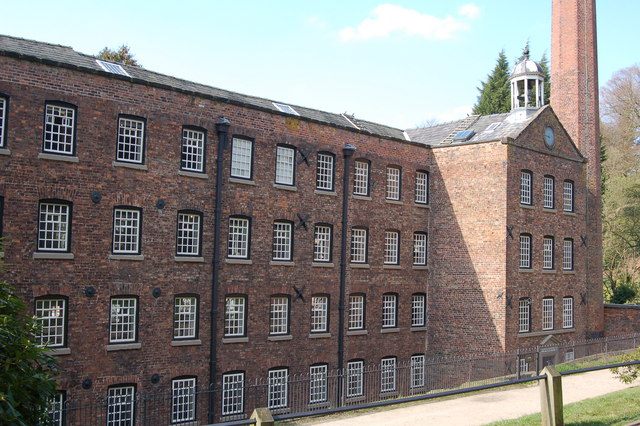
Front elevation of Quarry Bank Mill

Quarry Bank is an example of an early, rural, cotton-spinning mill that was initially dependent on water power. The first mill was built by Samuel Greg and John Massey in 1784. Its design was functional and unadorned, growing out of the pragmatism of the men who felt no need to make a bold architectural statement. It was a four-storey mill measuring 28 feet (8.5 m) by 90 feet (27.5 m), with an attached staircase, counting house and warehouse. It was designed to use water frames, which had just come out of patent, and the increased supply of cotton caused by the cessation of the American War of Independence. The water wheel was at the north end of the mill.

The mill was extended in 1796 when it was doubled in length and a fifth floor added. A second wheel was built at the southern end. The mill was extended between 1817 and 1820, and a mansard-roofed wing was added to part of the 1796 building forward, beneath which the wheel was installed. The new building kept the 1784 detailing with respect to line and windows. The 1784 mill ran 2425 spindles. After 1805, with the new wheel, it ran 3452 spindles.

Weaving sheds were added in 1836 and 1838, and they were of two storeys and housed 305 looms. Before the 1830s, spinning mills produced cotton, that was put-out to hand-loom weavers who worked in their own homes or small loom shops, like the one Greg owned at Eyam. Hand-loom weaving continued in parallel to power loom weaving throughout the 19th century. Around 1830, the power loom became sufficiently viable for independent weaving sheds to be set up, and for larger owners to add weaving sheds to their spinning mills. A weaving shed needed the correct light and humidity, and a floor that was stable enough to withstand the vibration caused by the picking of many looms. Quarry Bank Mill is of national significance in that it used two-storey side-lit buildings rather the a single storey sheds with a saw-tooth roof. The first two-storey shed at Quarry Bank was 108 feet (33 m) by 21 feet (6.5 m). The 1838 building was 98 feet (30 m) by 33 feet (10 m) to which a storey was added in 1842 for warping and beaming. In the Gregs pragmatic way, looms were purchased gradually.

=== Water power ===
The waterwheel rotating

The first wheel was a wooden overshot wheel taking water by means of a long leat from upstream on the River Bollin. The second wheel built by Peter Ewart in 1801 was wooden. To increase power, he dammed the Bollin and took water into the mill directly, the tailrace leaving the river below the dam. The third wheel of 1807 was a replacement for one of the wooden wheels. It is believed to have been a suspension wheel, 26 feet (8 m) in diameter made from iron to the design of Thomas Hewes.

The fourth wheel, known as the Great Wheel, was also designed by Hewes. The challenge was to increase the head of water acting on the wheel while using the same volume of water. It was achieved by sinking the wheel pit to below the level of the river and taking the tail race through a tunnel a kilometre downstream to rejoin the Bollin at Giant's Castle. This gave a head of 32 feet (9.8 m) acting on the 32-foot (9.8 m) diameter suspension wheel, which is 21 feet (6.4 m) wide. The Great Wheel operated from 1818 to 1871 when the mill pool had silted up, and then to 1904.

In 1905, two water turbines built by Gilbert Gilkes and Company were installed to replace the Great Wheel. They used the same head and tail race and operated until 1959. When the mill was restored in 1983, a 25-foot (7.6 m) diameter waterwheel of similar design to that of Hewes by his pupil Sir William Fairbairn was moved from Glasshouses Mill near Pateley Bridge and installed to provide power to work the machinery.

=== Steam power ===
Water flow from the Bollin was unreliable, so an auxiliary steam engine was procured in 1810. It was a 10 hp beam engine from Boulton and Watt. In 1836 with the arrival of power looms a second 20 hp Boulton and Watt beam engine was acquired. The first horizontal condensing engine was acquired in 1871. A new engine house was built. In 1906 the 1871 engine was replaced by a second-hand 60 hp engine. The engines no longer exist, and the museum has purchased a similar steam engine to display.

== Profiting from the slave trade ==
The Gregs were involved in the triangular trade. Samuel Greg's brother-in-law, Thomas Hodgson, owned a slave ship; his father, Thomas Greg, and his brother, John Greg, part-owned sugar plantations on the Caribbean island of Dominica. The best documented is Hillsborough Estate, Dominica, which Samuel Greg and his brother Thomas inherited in 1795. In 1818, it had 71 male and 68 female slaves.

A research document states that "although [Samuel] Greg did not rely on Caribbean estate earnings to finance entry into cotton spinning, his interest in plantations formed part of a wider family engagement in commerce that included significant slave-related business". "Samuel Greg ... his father Thomas and uncle John had interests in four estates in Dominica and St Vincent, ... while Samuel and his brother Thomas inherited the Hillsborough plantation in Dominica and other estates", according to a news item. The document also confirms that Samuel Greg's brothers were owners of estates in the West Indies, where labour was provided by slaves.

In 2020 the National Trust was working on a plan to include coverage about the owners of its properties, including the Quarry Bank Mill, who had links to colonialism and slavery. Visitors can find information about the "histories of slavery and colonialism" at the site.

== In popular culture ==
The relationship between mill owners and employees at Quarry Bank, starting in 1833, was explored in the 2013–2014 television series The Mill. The producers used stories from the archives of the mill; the ten episodes were based on the stories but included some fictional characters. Some of the exteriors were filmed at the Quarry Bank Mill while others in the city centre of Chester and at Chester Crown Court. Interiors of the work in the mill were filmed in Manchester because "the real factory floor couldn’t be easily converted from its contemporary function as a museum".

In 2020 some scenes for the ITV series Belgravia were filmed at the mill.

== Galleries ==
The village of Styal

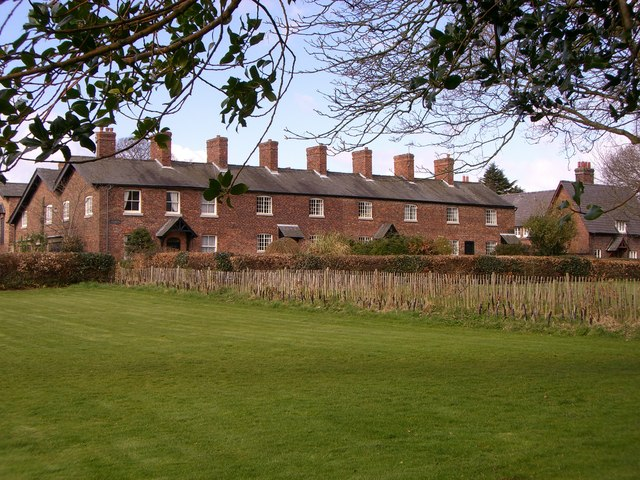
Workers cottages

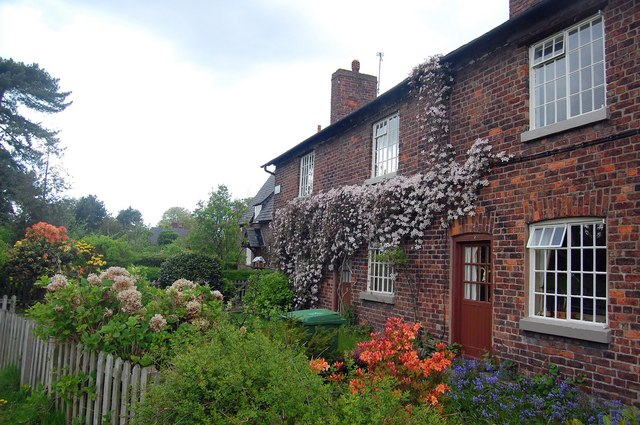
Workers cottages

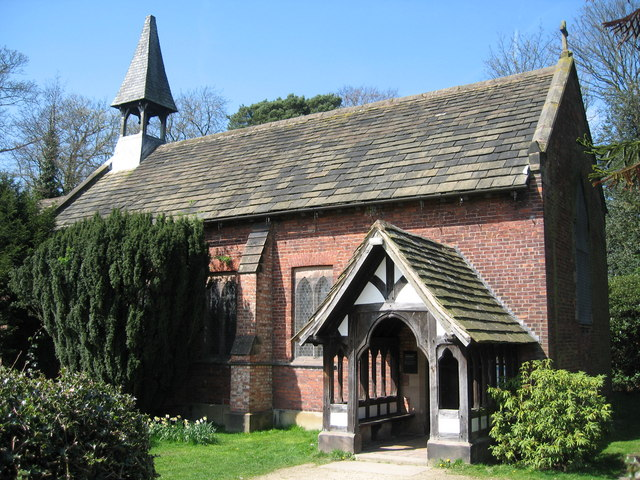
Norcliffe Chapel
Working machines

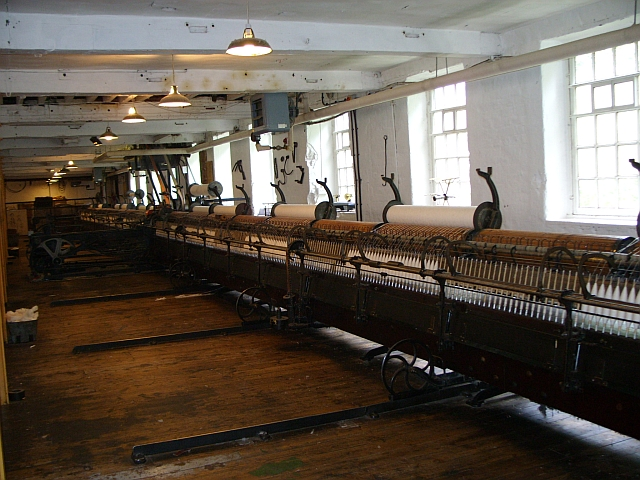
A working Mule spinning machine at Quarry Bank Mill.

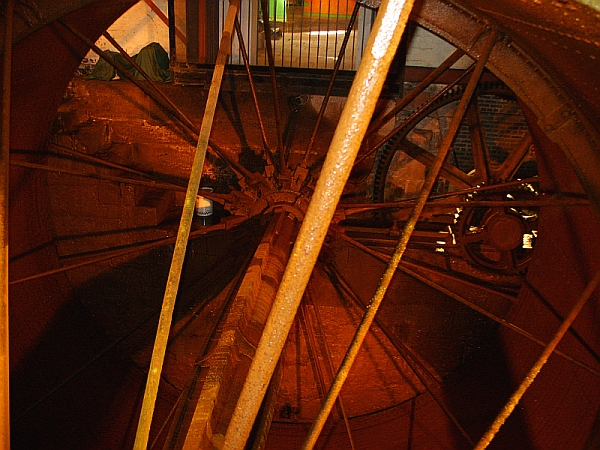
A view inside the largest water wheel in the United Kingdom. It is still working today, powering the looms.

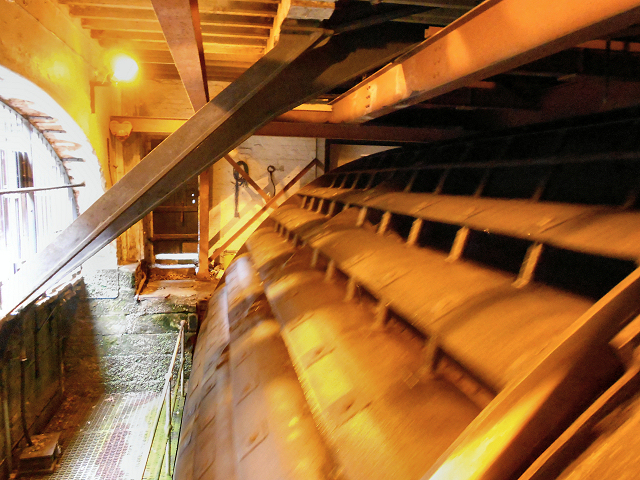
The new wheel

A video of the working Mule spinning machine at Quarry Bank Mill

== See also ==
- Grade II* listed buildings in Cheshire East
- Listed buildings in Wilmslow
- Factory Acts
- List of textile mills in Cheshire
- List of watermills in the United Kingdom
