= Frances Atkins =

British chef

- Born: Frances Venning; Maidstone, Kent
- Education: Bradford School of Food and Technology
- Spouses: George Carman (m. 1976; div. 1984) Bill Atkins (m. 1984)
- Culinary career
- Cooking style: British cuisine
- Rating: Michelin stars
- Previous restaurants: Yorke Arms; Shaw's Restaurant; The Old Plow; Atkins Restaurant
- Television shows: A Taste of Yorkshire; Great British Menu

Frances Atkins is a British chef. She won a Michelin star at the Yorke Arms in 2003.

== Career ==
Frances Venning was born in Maidstone, Kent, but grew up in Ilkley, West Yorkshire. Her father had served in the Royal Engineers during the Second World War. He was involved in the creation of the portable Mulberry harbours used during the D-Day landings. Frances trained in hotel management at Bradford College, and went on to work at The Box Tree restaurant in Ilkley. She moved to Scotland to work at Dalhousie Castle, and then Denmark to work in different kitchens. When she was 23, she met and married her first husband, George Carman QC.

For the following 10 years, Frances did not work as her husband felt that women should not. She later called the marriage "a disaster", and after they divorced in 1984, she started to work as a cook in a pub and then began a catering company. This proved successful and she opened a cafe, and met her second husband, Bill Atkins. Together, they closed the cafe and opened Atkins Restaurant. During this period, she would close the restaurant on Sundays and go to visit Raymond Blanc at Le Manoir aux Quat’ Saisons, who she later called a "huge mentor".

Atkins then left to run the Old Plow in Speen, Buckinghamshire, and then opened the Farleyer House in Scotland. It was there that she was awarded a Bib Gourmand award in the Michelin Guide. Sir Neil Shaw, the chairman of Tate & Lyle then asked her to open a restaurant with his backing. Shaw's Restaurant opened under Atkins in 1993, but after three years she wanted to move back to Yorkshire. In 1997, they purchased the Yorke Arms in Ramsgill. The pub was already known for good food, and Atkins initially wanted to keep the menu simple. However, she worked on the menu and was awarded a Michelin star in 2003.

She appeared on BBC Two television series Great British Menu in 2014, where her dishes paid tribute to her father. While Atkins worked as head chef, her husband ran the business side of the restaurant. The couple decided to put the restaurant up for sale in 2017 for £1.75 million, as Bill was looking to retire.

Yorke Arms lost its Michelin star in October 2019 but then earned its third rosette from AA plc in February 2020. Yorke Arms has been closed as a restaurant since July 2020 amid COVID-19 pandemic and planned to be reopened as a private country house for hire. Atkins launched a catering project Paradise Food with her two former Yorke Arms colleagues of over 20 years, chef Roger Olive and manager John Tullett.
