= Wath-in-Nidderdale railway station =

Disused railway station in North Yorkshire, England

Wath-in-Nidderdale

General information
- Location: Wath-in-Nidderdale; North Yorkshire; England
- Coordinates: 54.105°N 1.778°W
- System: Light railway
- Line: Nidd Valley Light Railway
- Platforms: 1
- Tracks: 2

History
- Opened: 11 September 1907 (as Wath)
- Closed: 1 January 1930
- Original company: Nidd Valley Light Railway

Key dates
- February 1908: Renamed Wath-in-Nidderdale
Location

Wath-in-Nidderdale railway station, was one of two intermediate stations on the Nidd Valley Light Railway, in Wath-in-Nidderdale, Yorkshire, England. The station was opened in September 1907, and closed to passengers in January 1930, however the line remained open until 1936 to transport freight to and from the reservoirs in the Upper Nidd Valley.

== History ==
The station, which was 1 1/2 miles (2.4 km) north of Pateley Bridge station, was opened to the public on 12 September 1907, however, a ceremonial opening service for dignitaries, traversed the line the day before, including stops further up past at the reservoir sites. Just like Lofthouse-in-Nidderdale and Ramsgill stations, Wath was equipped with one platform and a freight loop. Control of the points and signalling was by a ground frame installed on the platform, rather than a signal box. The goods shed and separate siding was located east of the station platform, and was accessed by a connection that headed south onto the main running line.

Due to a petition by the North Eastern Railway's goods manager, the station was renamed from Wath, to Wath-in-Nidderdale. Wath station was staffed by a stationmaster/porter, who had use of the station house, but by the early 1920s, the station (along with Ramsgill) became an unstaffed halt, with the goods shed closing, and the station building converted into a house. The last passenger trains to call at the station ran on 31 December 1929, with official closure on the following day, 1 January 1930, however the line through the station site remained open for goods traffic until 1936.

The two-storey station building is now a private residence.

Preceding station	Disused railways	Following station
Pateley Bridge; Line and station closed	Nidd Valley Light Railway	Ramsgill; Line and station closed
