= High and Low Bishopside =

Civil parish in North Yorkshire, England

Coordinates: 54.105156°N 1.7319345°W

- Civil parish
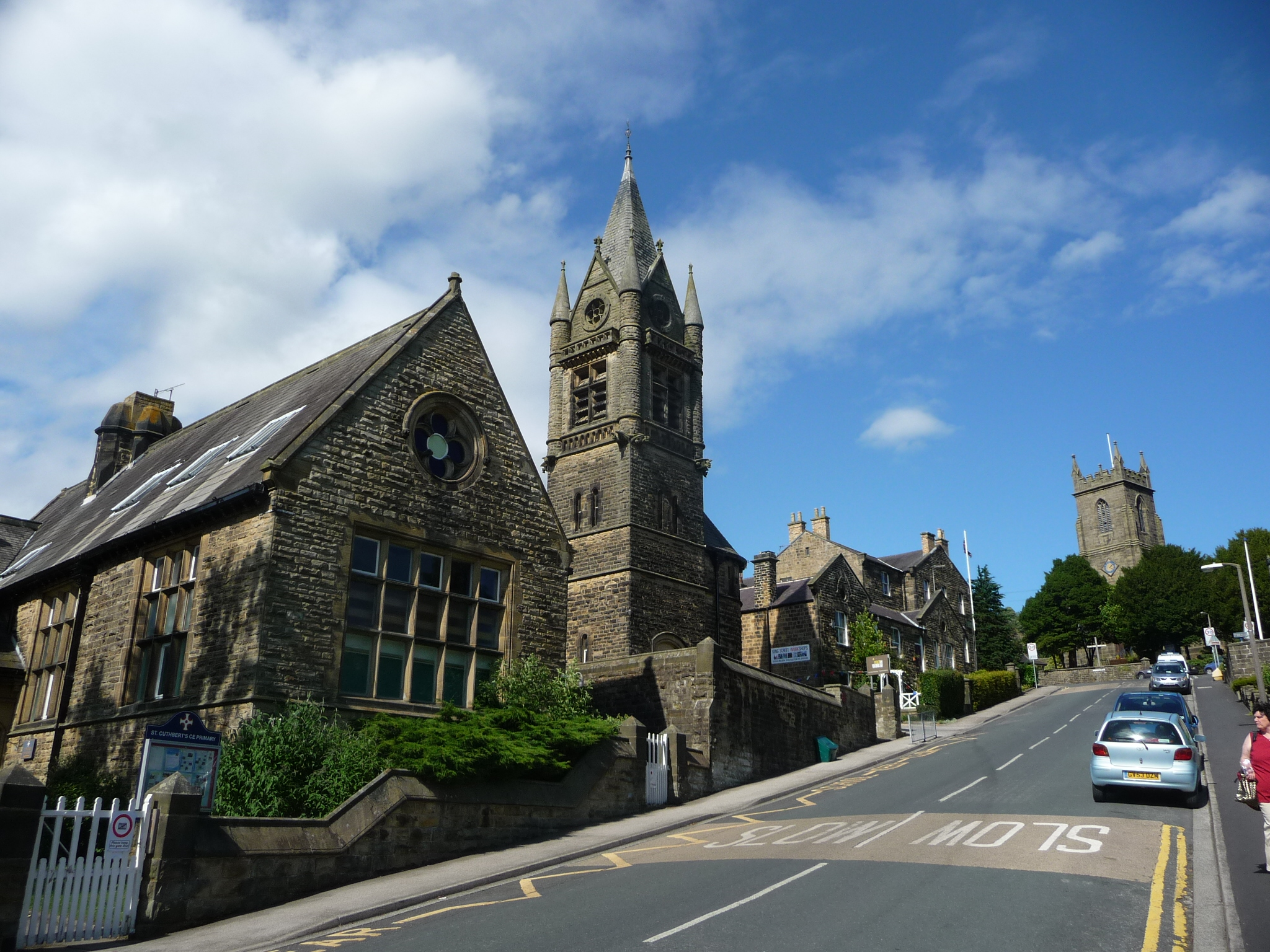
- Pateley Bridge

- Location within North Yorkshire
- Area: 25.72 km^{2} (9.93 sq mi)
- Population: 2,210 (2011 census)
  - Density: 86/km^{2} (220/sq mi)
- OS grid reference: SE175677
- Civil parish: High and Low Bishopside
- Unitary authority: North Yorkshire
- Ceremonial county: North Yorkshire
- Region: Yorkshire and the Humber
- Country: England
- Sovereign state: United Kingdom
- Main settlements: Pateley Bridge, Glasshouses, Wath and Wilsill
- Police: North Yorkshire
- Fire: North Yorkshire
- Ambulance: Yorkshire
- Website: https://www.pateleybridgetowncouncil.gov.uk/

High and Low Bishopside is a civil parish in Nidderdale, in North Yorkshire, England. It includes the town of Pateley Bridge and the villages of Glasshouses and Wilsill, the southern part of Wath and the hamlets of Blazefield, and Fellbeck.

The parish touches Bewerley, Dacre, Eavestone, Fountains Earth, Hartwith cum Winsley, Laverton, Sawley, Stonebeck Down and Warsill. In 2011 the parish had a population of 2,210. There are 39 listed buildings in High and Low Bishopside. The parish's council is called "Pateley Bridge Town Council".

The parish is bounded on the west by the River Nidd, and includes a large area of moorland to the east of the town. The parish therefore does not include the part of the Pateley Bridge built-up area west of the Nidd in the parish of Bewerley, where Pateley Bridge post office, the Nidderdale showground, Nidderdale High School and the district of Bridgehouse Gate are located.

== History ==
The name "Bishopside" means 'Bishop's hill-side'. The name is first recorded in 1459, and derives from its status in the manor or liberty of Ripon held by the Archbishop of York. The link with the archbishop dates back before the Norman Conquest, and in the 12th century Wilsill was the principal settlement of what became Bishopside. High and Low Bishopside was a township in the parish of Ripon, but in 1866 High and Low Bishopside became a civil parish in its own right. On 1 April 1937 351 acres was transferred from Sawley to High and Low Bishopside.

== Governance ==
The parish is represented by the Pateley Bridge Town Council, comprising eleven councillors elected for a four-year term. The council was formed in 1894 as the High and Low Bishopside Parish Council, and in 1986 elected to change its name. A town mayor is elected annually by the councillors.

The parish was historically part of the West Riding of Yorkshire, but in 1974 was transferred to the new county of North Yorkshire. From 1974 to 2023 the parish was part of the non-metropolitan district of Harrogate and fell within the Harrogate Borough Council ward of Pateley Bridge and Nidderdale Moors. The parish now falls within the North Yorkshire Council electoral division of Pateley Bridge and Nidderdale.

== See also ==
- Listed buildings in High and Low Bishopside
