= Glasshouses, North Yorkshire =

Village in North Yorkshire, England

Coordinates: 54°04′36″N 1°44′13″W

Glasshouses
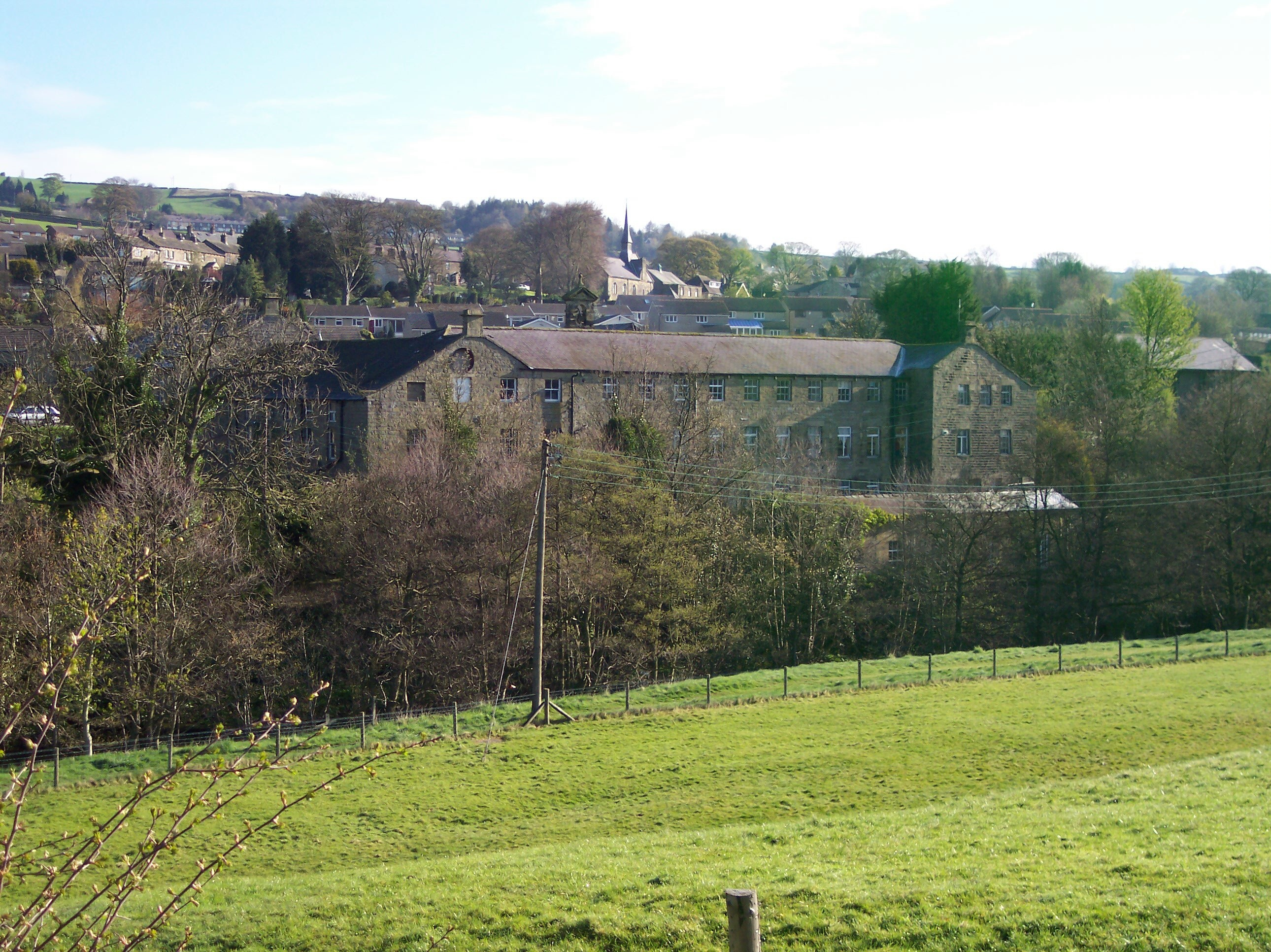
- Glasshouse Mill

- Location within North Yorkshire
- Area: 0.2025 km^{2} (0.0782 sq mi)
- Population: 536 (2019 estimate)
  - Density: 2,647/km^{2} (6,860/sq mi)
- OS grid reference: SE175645
- Civil parish: High and Low Bishopside
- Unitary authority: North Yorkshire
- Ceremonial county: North Yorkshire
- Region: Yorkshire and the Humber
- Country: England
- Sovereign state: United Kingdom
- Post town: Harrogate
- Postcode district: HG3
- Dialling code: 01423
- Police: North Yorkshire
- Fire: North Yorkshire
- Ambulance: Yorkshire
- UK Parliament: Skipton and Ripon

Glasshouses is a small village in Nidderdale, North Yorkshire, England. It lies 1 mile (1.6 km) south-east of Pateley Bridge on the east side of Nidderdale and has a recently rebuilt river bridge across the River Nidd. In 2019 it had an estimated population of 536.

== History ==
Records about Glasshouses stretch as far back as 1386 and the name of the village is believed to have derived from the Old English Glas Hus, which translates as the place where glass was made. Whilst there is no firm evidence of this, it was believed that glass for Fountains Abbey was made here. In the 16th century, lead was mined to the west and transported to the hamlet of Wilsill (east of Glasshouses) for smelting and onward transportation.

Glasshouses Mill, on the banks of the Nidd, was constructed between 1812 and 1814. The mill was used to produce flax, then hemp and latterly, rope. Local rumour has it that the mill supplied rope to the White Star Line and most notably, Glasshouse rope was used on the Titanic. When the railway was opened in the valley, it was used to transport coal into the millworks to provide additional power other than that made by the waterwheel. In 1830, a milldam was built on the northern bank of the River Nidd and a millrace was added at the same time. The dam still exists and is capable of storing 10,000,000 imperial gallons (45,000,000 L; 12,000,000 US gal) of water. The dam is not used to power a waterwheel anymore, but is used for recreational purposes; fishing, skating in winter and water sports in summer.

The mill was built by the Metcalfe family, who sold the business in 1907 after financial trouble. The mill continued until 1972 when production ceased and it was occupied by numerous small businesses. In 2017, it was announced that the grade II listed building would be converted into housing.

The Metcalfe family were also responsible for building the school in 1861. The building still stands and now operates as the village primary school. Glasshouses Community Primary School was rated as being 'Good' by Ofsted in January 2017.

There is a public house, The Birch Tree Inn, on the main Harrogate to Pateley Bridge road just outside the village in the neighbouring hamlet of Wilsill.

May day is celebrated every year with traditional May Pole dancing and the crowning of the 'May Queen' on the village green.

== Transport ==
Glasshouses lies just 1-mile (1.6 km) east of Pateley Bridge. Both Glasshouses and Pateley Bridge are linked by the B6265 road which travels down the valley to meet the A61 road at Ripley. There is a regular bus service on the road between Harrogate and Pateley Bridge.

Whilst the Nidd Valley Railway went right through the village, no station was built in Glasshouses. The mill and gas works complex shared a siding, primarily for the inward transportation of coal.

The long-distance walk, the Six Dales Trail, runs through the village.

== Amenities ==
- Bed & Breakfast establishments
- Children's playground (Private)
- Glasshouses Primary School
- The Birch Tree Inn public house
- Village hall (Broadbelt Hall)

== See also ==
- Listed buildings in High and Low Bishopside
