= St Cuthbert's Church, Pateley Bridge =

Church building in Pateley Bridge, North Yorkshire, England

Coordinates: 54°05′16″N 1°45′30″W

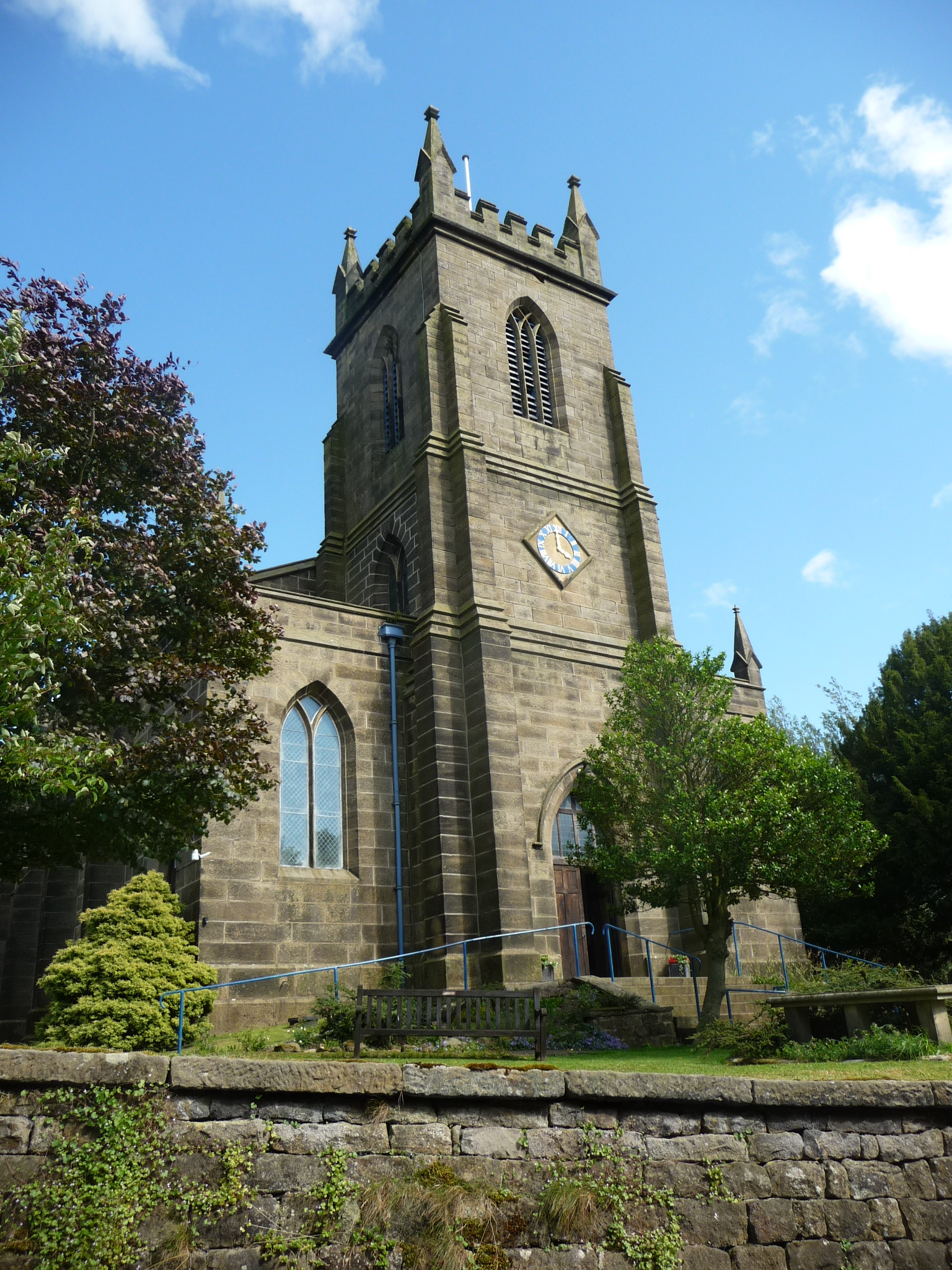
The church, in 2012

St Cuthbert's Church is the parish church of Pateley Bridge, a town in North Yorkshire, in England.

St Mary's Church, Pateley Bridge was the town's church from the 13th century, but in 1827 a replacement was constructed, to a design by John Woodhead and William Hurst. It was originally a chapel of ease to Ripon Minster, and was originally also dedicated to Mary, Mother of Jesus. It is a substantial building, which originally had seating for 568 worshippers, but in 1851 had fewer than 40 regular attendees. It was grade II listed in 1967.

The church is built of stone with a slate roof, and consists of a nave, north and south porches, a chancel and a west tower. The tower has three stages, angle buttresses, a plinth, triple-chamfered bands, a west doorway with a pointed head, a fanlight, a chamfered surround and a hood mould. Above is a clock face in a diamond-shaped tablet, windows with pointed heads, three-light bell openings, a moulded cornice, and an embattled parapet with corner pinnacles. The stained glass in the east window was designed by Jean-Baptiste Capronnier and Francois-Ambroise Comere in 1893.

== See also ==
- Listed buildings in High and Low Bishopside
