= Stean =

Village in North Yorkshire, England

Coordinates: 54.1565°N 1.8625°W

- Location within North Yorkshire
- Population: 10
- OS grid reference: SE085735
- Civil parish: Stonebeck Down
- Unitary authority: North Yorkshire
- Ceremonial county: North Yorkshire
- Region: Yorkshire and the Humber
- Country: England
- Sovereign state: United Kingdom
- Post town: HARROGATE
- Postcode district: HG3
- Police: North Yorkshire
- Fire: North Yorkshire
- Ambulance: Yorkshire
- UK Parliament: Skipton and Ripon

Stean is a small village in upper Nidderdale in North Yorkshire, England. It is 8 miles (13 km) north of Pateley Bridge.

The village is located on Stean Beck, a tributary of the River Nidd. Below Stean the beck flows through How Stean Gorge which includes a cave named after Tom Taylor, a highwayman who is rumoured to have hidden there.

== See also ==
- Listed buildings in Stonebeck Down

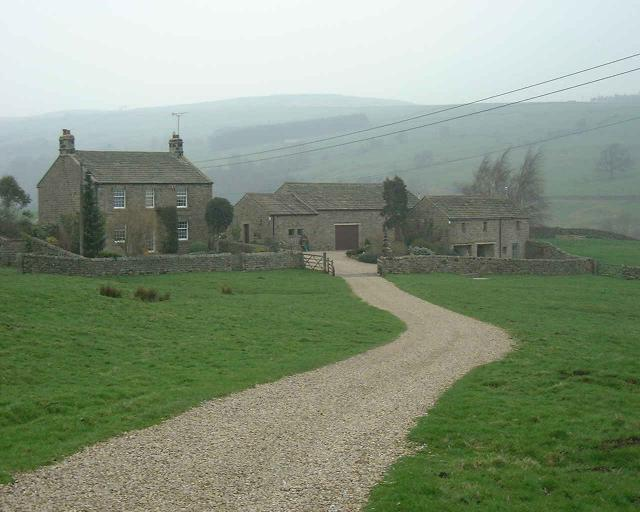
Stean
