= Listed buildings in Fountains Earth =

Fountains Earth is a civil parish in the county of North Yorkshire, England. It contains 15 listed buildings that are recorded in the National Heritage List for England. Of these, one is listed at Grade II*, the middle of the three grades, and the others are at Grade II, the lowest grade. The parish extends along Nidderdale, and contains the villages of Lofthouse and Bouthwaite, part of Wath-in-Nidderdale, and the surrounding countryside. Most of the listed buildings are houses, farmhouses and farm buildings, and the others include two war memorials, a bridge and a water pump.

== Key ==
Grade	Criteria
II*	Particularly important buildings of more than special interest
II	Buildings of national importance and special interest

== Buildings ==
Name and location	Photograph	Date	Notes	Grade
Barn, Sigsworth Lodge; 54.10608°N 1.77611°W		17th century	A farmhouse and outbuilding later converted for other uses, it is in stone with a stone slate roof. There are two storeys, four bays, and a single-bay outbuilding on the left. The doorway has a chamfered surround, above the door are two single-light segmental-headed windows, and the other windows are mullioned. In the left bay, external steps lead up to a door.	II
Farmbuilding east of Brackenridge Farmhouse; 54.18821°N 1.84453°W		Late 17th century	A farmhouse, later a farm building, in stone, with quoins, and a Welsh slate roof with shaped kneelers and stone coping. There are two storeys and five bays. In the centre is a doorway with a chamfered surround, a basket arched head, and a hood mould, over which is a single-light arched window. There are further doorways, and windows, most of which are mullioned, with some mullions missing.	II
Bouthwaite Grange and Grange Cottage; 54.13742°N 1.81301°W	—	1673	A stone house with a stone slate roof, two storeys and five bays. The central doorway has a chamfered surround and a dated and initialled basket arched lintel. To the right is a doorway with a chamfered surround and a four-centred arched head. The windows either have a single light, or are chamfered and mullioned, some with hood moulds.	II*
Home Farmhouse; 54.15668°N 1.84630°W	—	1676	The farmhouse is in stone, with quoins, and a stone slate roof with stone copings. There are two storeys and four bays. On the front is a porch with a doorway in the right return. The windows are chamfered and mullioned, those in the ground floor under a continuous hood mould. At the rear is a blocked dated doorway with a chamfered surround.	II
Covill Grange; 54.12861°N 1.80347°W		1685	The house is in stone, with quoins, and a stone slate roof with kneelers and moulded coping. There are two storeys and an attic, and three bays. The central doorway has a quoined surround and a fanlight, and the windows on the front are sashes. In the right return is a doorway with a quoined chamfered surround, a dated basket arched lintel and a hood mould. The windows in the return are chamfered and mullioned with hood moulds, and in the gable is a stepped three-light mullioned window.	II
Sigsworth Grange and barn 54.11374°N 1.77537°W	—	Early 18th century	The farmhouse and barn are in stone with quoins and a Welsh slate roof. The house has two storeys and two bays. The doorway has a plain surround, there is a small arched fire window with a chamfered surround, and the other windows are mullioned with moulded chamfered surrounds. To the left is a barn with two doorways, one with a flat head and the other with a segmental head.	II
Thwaite House Farmhouse; 54.18190°N 1.84549°W		1742	The farmhouse is in stone, and has a Welsh slate roof with shaped kneelers and moulded coping. There are two storeys and four bays. On the front is a doorway with a moulded surround, and a similar blind doorway to the right. The windows have moulded surrounds, in the ground floor they are sashes and in the upper floor they are casements. On the front is a dated and initialled tablet.	II
Thrope House Farmhouse; 54.17156°N 1.84534°W		Mid 18th century	The farmhouse is in stone, with quoins, and a Welsh slate roof with moulded kneelers and moulded coping. There are two storeys and six bays. The doorway has a quoined surround, and the windows have chamfered surrounds and mullions, with some mullions missing. At the rear is a gabled stair wing containing a Venetian window. Inside, there is a large inglenook fireplace.	II
Dale Cottage; 54.15699°N 1.84649°W	—	Late 18th to early 19th century	A cottage, and attached workshop to the right, in stone with quoins, a sill band and a slate roof. In the centre of the cottage is a doorway, and the windows are sashes, all with quoined surrounds and channelled lintels. External steps lead up to a doorway in the workshop, and under it is a further entrance.	II
Drinking fountain and war memorial 54.15724°N 1.84646°W		18th to 19th century	Originally a drinking fountain, it was converted into a war memorial in 1920. It consists of a square stone monolith surmounted by a cross, standing in an octagonal stone trough. On the west side is a doorway, over which is an inscription, and decoration forming a round arch with a keystone. On each side of the monolith is an inscription, and on the west side is a water tap.	II
Hay barn, Springtop Wood Farm; 54.10974°N 1.77762°W		1815	The barn is in stone with a stone slate roof and three bays. It contains three full-height openings with two piers. In the left return is a doorway above which is a dated and initialled stone tablet, and in the gable are pigeon holes with stone ledges.	II
Helks House; 54.14254°N 1.80973°W	—	Early 19th century	The house, which was extended in 1844, is in stone, and has a slate roof with stone coped gables and kneelers. There are two storeys and three bays. In the centre is a round-arched doorway with a quoined surround and a fanlight. The windows are sashes with Tudor hood moulds, and at the rear is a later dated porch.	II
Wath Bridge; 54.10527°N 1.78042°W		Early 19th century	The bridge carries a road over the River Nidd. It is in stone and consists of a single segmental arch. The bridge has voussoirs, a hood mould, and a coped parapet with iron railings.	II
Lofthouse Pump; 54.15576°N 1.84538°W	—	Mid 19th century	The pump is in stone, and has a trough, above which is a semicircular-arched niche with voussoirs and an impost band. At the top is a coped pediment.	II
The Victory Memorial; 54.15770°N 1.84593°W		1919	A war memorial in sandstone, it consists of a block of rusticated stones, in front of which is a rectangular stone trough. On the block is a pediment with a stone slate roof containing inscriptions, including significant dates in the First World War, On the trough is inscribed the word "VICTORY".	II
