= Bouthwaite =

Hamlet in North Yorkshire, England

Coordinates: 54°08′14″N 1°48′47″W

- Location within North Yorkshire
- OS grid reference: SE1271
- Civil parish: Fountains Earth
- Unitary authority: North Yorkshire
- Ceremonial county: North Yorkshire
- Region: Yorkshire and the Humber
- Country: England
- Sovereign state: United Kingdom
- Post town: HARROGATE
- Postcode district: HG3
- Police: North Yorkshire
- Fire: North Yorkshire
- Ambulance: Yorkshire

Bouthwaite is a hamlet in the county of North Yorkshire, England. It is situated in Nidderdale, to the north of Pateley Bridge, close to the village of Ramsgill. The Nidderdale Way and Six Dales Trail both pass through the hamlet.

The place is first mentioned in 1184 as Burtheit. The toponym means "cottage or store-house clearing", from the Old Norse búr and þveit. Fountains Abbey owned the land in the Middle Ages and established a grange at Bouthwaite. The farmhouse named Bouthwaite Grange now stands on the site.

Until 1974 it was part of the West Riding of Yorkshire. From 1974 to 2023 it was part of the Borough of Harrogate, it is now administered by the unitary North Yorkshire Council.

Between 1907 and 1930 Bouthwaite was the site of Ramsgill railway station on the Nidd Valley Light Railway.

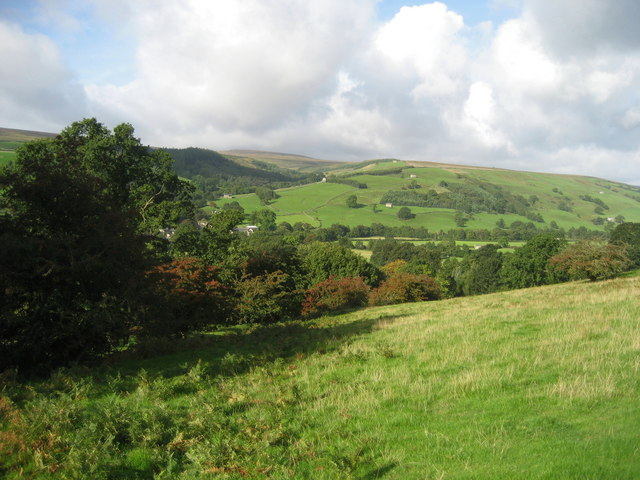
Upper Nidderdale near Bouthwaite

== See also ==
- Listed buildings in Fountains Earth
