= St Mary's Church, Ramsgill =

Church in Ramsgill, North Yorkshire, England

Coordinates: 54°08′03″N 1°49′07″W

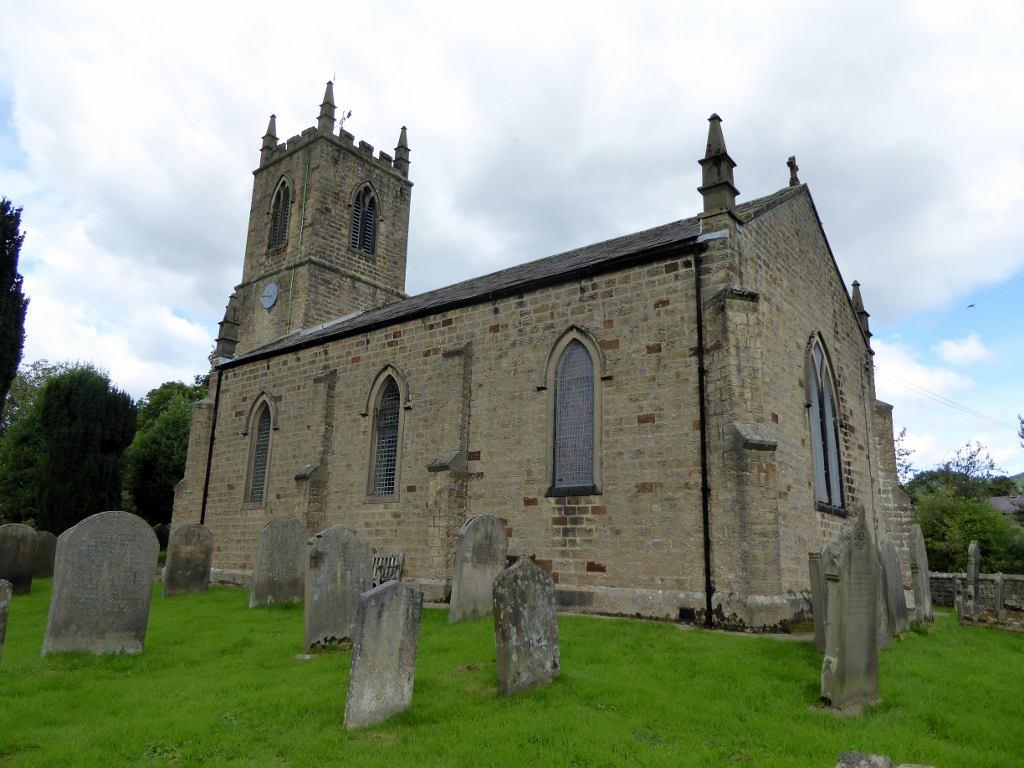
The church, in 2015

St Mary's Church is an Anglican church in Ramsgill, a village in North Yorkshire, in England.

== History ==
A chapel was erected in Ramsgill in the mediaeval period, by the monks of Byland Abbey. It later fell into ruin, and the villagers then worshipped at St Andrew's Church, Kirkby Malzeard. In 1842, a chapel of ease was built in the village, at a cost of £1,468, and it had a capacity of 170 worshippers. By 1851, the church was attracting more than 200 attendees across two services each Sunday. The building was restored between 1887 and 1890, the work including the removal of the gallery, replacement of the pews and altar, insertion of stained glass designed by Powell Brothers, addition of a vestry, and internal decoration. The building was grade II listed in 1987.

== Architecture ==
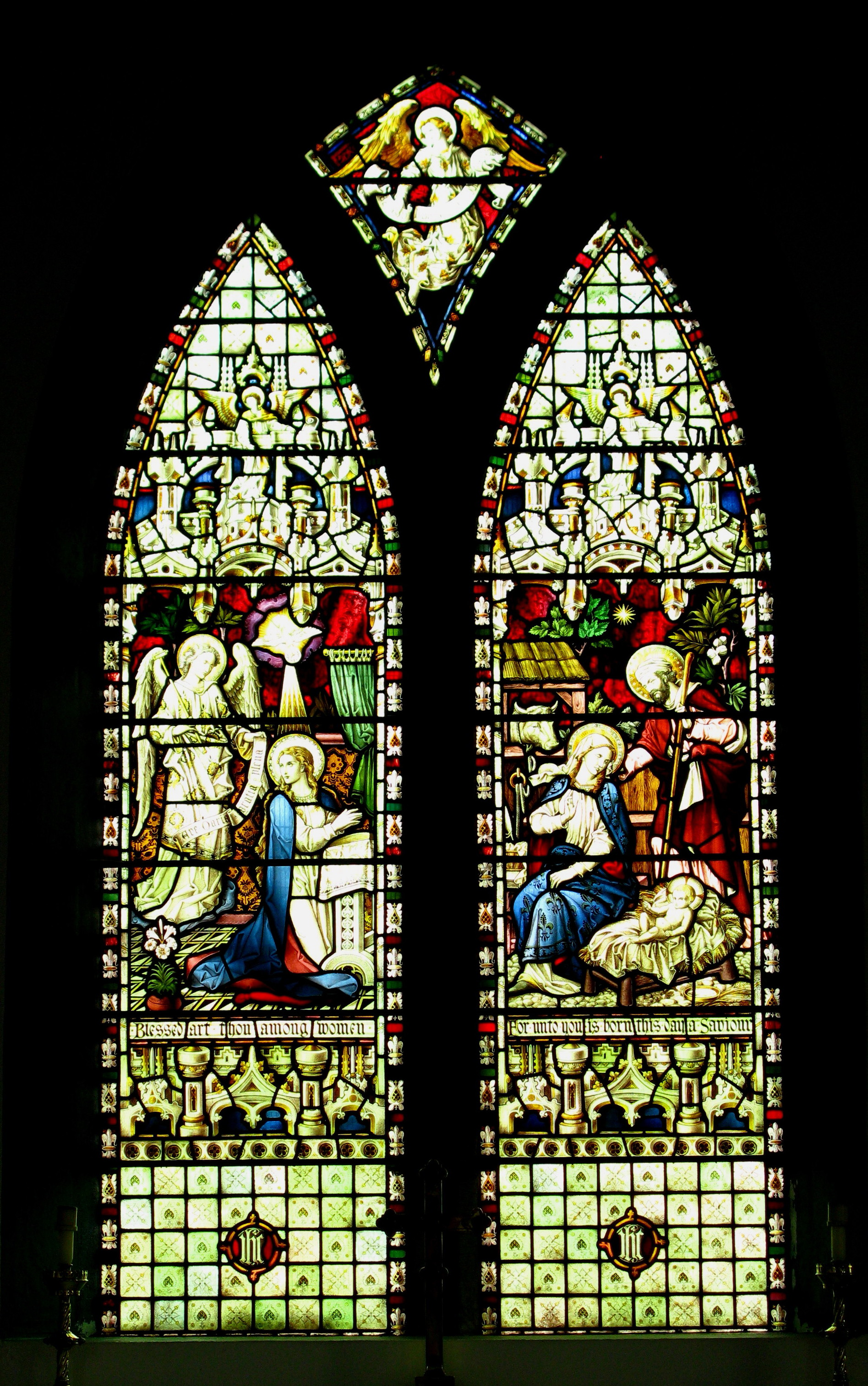
The east window

The church is built of stone, it has a slate roof, and consists of a nave and a west tower. The tower has three stages, diagonal buttresses, a west doorway with a pointed arch and a hood mould, lancet windows, clock faces, chamfered bands, two-light bell openings with hood moulds, and an embattled parapet with corner pinnacles. On the body of the church are lancet windows with hood moulds.

== Chapel ==
The ruins of the former chapel lie in the churchyard, and are also grade II listed. It is built of stone, and consists of a stone coped gabled wall, containing two short lancet windows, and a larger one above.

== See also ==
- Listed buildings in Stonebeck Down
