= Bouthwaite Grange =

Cottage in North Yorkshire, England

Coordinates: 54.1374°N 1.8130°W

Bouthwaite Grange is a historic building in Bouthwaite, a hamlet in Nidderdale in North Yorkshire, England.

In the late mediaeval period, Bouthwaite was a lodge associated with Dacre, itself a grange of Fountains Abbey. The current house was built in 1673, and was altered in both the 18th and 19th centuries. Remains of various associated buildings survived until the 20th century, but were then demolished so that farm outbuildings could be built. The house was grade II* listed in 1967, at which time part of it had been subdivided as Grange Cottage.

The house is built of stone with a stone slate roof, and has two storeys and five bays. The central doorway has a chamfered surround and a dated and initialled basket arched lintel. To the right is a doorway with a chamfered surround and a four-centred arched head. The windows either have a single light, or are chamfered and mullioned, some with hood moulds. Inside, there is a 17th-century oak staircase, and panelling, stone fireplaces, and oak doors with ironwork, all of similar date.

== See also ==
- Grade II* listed buildings in North Yorkshire (district)
- Listed buildings in Fountains Earth
