= Listed buildings in High and Low Bishopside =

High and Low Bishopside is a civil parish in the county of North Yorkshire, England. It contains 40 listed buildings that are recorded in the National Heritage List for England. All the listed buildings are designated at Grade II, the lowest of the three grades, which is applied to "buildings of national importance and special interest". The parish contains the town of Pateley Bridge, the villages of Glasshouses, Wath and Wilsill and the hamlets of Blazefield, Fellbeck and The Knott. The listed buildings include houses, shops and cottages, farmhouses and farm buildings, churches and items in a churchyard, a hotel and a public house, bridges, a former watermill, mileposts and a pump.

== Buildings ==
Name and location	Photograph	Date	Notes
Rose Cottage Farmhouse, Top Wath Road, Pateley Bridge; 54.09099°N 1.76156°W	—	16th century	The farmhouse has a cruck-framed core, and was encased in stone in the early 17th century. It has quoins, and a stone slate roof with stone coping on the left gable. There are two storeys and two bays. The doorway has a chamfered surround, and the windows are casements with double-chamfered surrounds, the mullions now missing. Inside, there are two cruck trusses.
35, 37 and 39 High Street, Pateley Bridge; 54.08651°N 1.75884°W		17th century	A house, later three shops, in stone, with quoins, and a stone slate roof with shaped kneelers and stone coping. There are two storeys and five bays. In the left bay, steps lead up to a doorway with a chamfered surround and a basket arched lintel. To its right is a bay window and a casement window. Further to the right, steps lead to a doorway, with a sash window to the right. Beyond, to the right, is a shop window with pilasters, a frieze and a cornice, and a doorway. In the upper floor is a central two-light chamfered mullioned window, and the other bays contain sash windows.
Bridge House, Wilsill; 54.07746°N 1.72379°W	—	17th century	Two houses and a barn to the left converted for residential use, in stone, with quoins, and a stone slate roof with a shaped kneeler and moulded coping on the right. There are two storeys, the houses have four bays, and the former barn has two. In the house are two doorways, one with a chamfered quoined surround and a cambered-arched lintel, and the other with a plain surround. The windows are mullioned, some with hood moulds. The former barn contains a segmental arch with a keystone and voussoirs, a doorway with a plain surround, and sash windows.
Byrill Farmhouse, Wilsill; 54.07689°N 1.72448°W	—	17th century	The house is in stone, with quoins, and a stone slate roof with shaped kneelers and stone coping. There are two storeys, four bays, and a later recessed wing on the left. On the front is a porch, and the windows are mullioned, some with hood moulds. Inside, there is a large inglenook fireplace with a chamfered segmental arch.
Church Green House, Pateley Bridge; 54.08577°N 1.75172°W	—	17th century	The house is in stone with a stone slate roof. There are two storeys and four bays. The doorway has a quoined chamfered surround, a four-centred arch and a hood mould. Most of the windows are mullioned, some with hood moulds, and there is a sash window.
Cross Lane House, The Knott; 54.08330°N 1.74530°W	—	17th century	The house is in stone with quoins and a stone slate roof. There are two storeys and four bays. The doorway has a chamfered surround and a four-centred arched lintel, and the windows are mullioned. Inside, there is a large inglenook fireplace.
Holly Laithe, near Wilsill; 54.07839°N 1.71660°W	—	17th century	A house and a barn, later a farmhouse, in stone, with quoins, and a stone slate roof with stone copings. There are two storeys, six bays, and the former barn attacked at right angles to the north. On the front are three doorways, one with a chamfered quoined surround, and the windows are mullioned.
Kiln House, near Wilsill; 54.07787°N 1.71424°W	—	17th century	The house, with an earlier origin, is in stone with a Welsh slate roof. There is a single storey and attics, and three bays. In the left bay is a porch, its doorcase with a moulded chamfered surround, and the inner doorway with a chamfered surround and a four-centred arch. To the right are mullioned windows, and in the attic are two gabled dormers. Inside the house are two cruck frame trusses, and a large inglenook fireplace.
Manor House, Wilsill; 54.07672°N 1.72235°W	—	17th century	The house is in stone, and has a tile roof with shaped kneelers and stone coping. There are two storeys and four bays. The central doorway has a moulded surround, a basket arched head and a hood mould, and above it is a square blind panel with a moulded surround, and a single-light window. The other windows are mullioned, those in the ground floor with hood moulds.
St Mary's Church, Pateley Bridge; 54.08537°N 1.75209°W		17th century	The church is disused and in ruins. It is in stone, and consists of a nave without a roof, a south porch, and a west tower dated 1691. The tower has three stages, a plinth, quoins, a mullioned window, three one-light openings, round-arched bell openings, a moulded band, and an embattled parapet with corner pinnacles.
Yeadon Farmhouse and outbuilding, Wath; 54.10702°N 1.76257°W	—	17th century	The farmhouse and attached outbuilding are in stone, with quoins, and a roof of stone slate and Welsh slate with shaped kneelers and stone copings. There are two storeys, the house has two bays, and the single-bay outbuilding is to the left. The doorway has a chamfered surround, to the left is a square window opening, and the other windows in the front of the house are casements. The left bay has a doorway with a plain surround, cantilevered steps lead up to a doorway, and there are the remains of a sash window. In the right return is an outshut, and at the rear is a two-light mullioned window.
North Pasture Farmhouse, near Fellbeck; 54.08427°N 1.68899°W	—	1657	The farmhouse is in stone, with quoins, and a Welsh slate roof with stone coping. There are two storeys and three bays. In the centre is a porch, and a doorway with a dated and initialled lintel. The windows are mullioned, those in the ground floor with hood moulds.
The Pateley Club, Pateley Bridge; 54.08647°N 1.75836°W		1662	The building is in stone on a plinth, with quoins on the right, a floor band, an eaves band, and a stone slate roof. There are three storeys and wo bays. On the left is a doorway with a chamfered surround, and a dated and initialled four-centred arched lintel, and to the right are three canted bay windows with pilasters and hipped roofs. The middle floor contains sash windows with plain surrounds, and in the top floor are horizontally-sliding sashes with raised surrounds.
Ivy Cottage and Dalestone, Wilsill; 54.07677°N 1.72320°W	—	1672	A pair of cottages in stone, with quoins, and a stone slate roof with shaped kneelers and moulded stone coping. There are two storeys and three bays. In the centre is a porch, and a doorway with a moulded chamfered surround and a dated basket arched head. To the right is another doorway, and the ground floor windows are casements with hood moulds. The upper floor contains mullioned windows with some mullions missing.
Barns at Manor House, Wilsill; 54.07671°N 1.72261°W	—	Late 17th century	A pair of barns in stone with stone slate roofs and coped gables. The northern barn contains an arched cart opening with a chamfered surround and joggled voussoirs, and is flanked by a doorway and an opening, both with chamfered surrounds. The southern barn has a pair of blocked mullioned windows. Both barns have been truncated for road widening.
Barn west of Lupton Fold Farmhouse, Wath; 54.10137°N 1.77255°W		1683	The barn and cow byre are in stone with quoins and a stone slate roof. There is a single storey with a basement to the west, and two bays. It contains chamfered mullioned windows, a doorway with a plain surround and a slightly cambered-arched lintel, and in the basement is an inscribed and dated shouldered cambered-arched lintel.
Fellbeck Old Hall and barn 54.08994°N 1.69099°W	—	1685	A farmhouse and attached barn in stone, with a stone slate roof and a shaped kneeler and stone coping on the right. There are two storeys, three bays, and a single-bay barn to the right. The doorway in the house has a chamfered quoined surround, and a dated four-centred arched lintel, and the windows are mullioned with a partial hood mould. The barn contains a doorway with a quoined surround and a casement window, and a mullioned window above. Inside the house are two large cruck trusses.
Memorial to Mr Purse; 54.08526°N 1.75175°W		1714	The memorial is in the churchyard of St Mary's Church, Pateley Bridge to the southeast of the chancel. It is in stone, and consists of an octagonal shaft on an octagonal plinth, with a square band on the top. Inscribed on the shaft is the name and the date.
Talbot House, Pateley Bridge; 54.08640°N 1.75929°W		Early 18th century	A hotel in stone on a plinth, with quoins, floor bands, a frieze, a cornice, two stone-coped gables, and ball finials. There are three storeys and three bays. The central doorway has a Tuscan doorcase with a pediment, and above it is a semicircular-headed sash window with imposts and a keystone. The other windows are sashes with plain surrounds.
Tombstone to Thomas Green; 54.08542°N 1.75214°W		1741	The tombstone is in the churchyard of St Mary's Church, Pateley Bridge, to the west of the tower. It is in stone and has a shaped top and is flanked by fluted Doric pilasters. A the bottom is a stone skull and cross bones with wings an hour glass, and an inscription. Above this is a rectangular panel containing an inscribed bronze tablet, over which is an anthemion motif with a rose.
9 and 11 High Street, Pateley Bridge; 54.08612°N 1.76042°W		Mid 18th century	Two shops with flats above, with a stone slate roof, two storeys and two bays. In the ground floor are two shopfronts, each with pilaster, a frieze and a cornice. The upper floor contains a sash window in the left bay with a plain surround, in the middle bay is an arched window with imposts, and in the right bay is a casement window.
13 and 15 High Street, Pateley Bridge; 54.08617°N 1.76028°W		Mid 18th century	A house and two commercial premises, known as King's House, in stone, with quoins, and a stone slate roof with shaped kneelers and stone coping. There are three storeys and five bays. The left bay contains a segmental carriage arch with voussoirs, and to the right is a shopfront. Further to the right are two two-storey canted bay windows flanking a doorway with pilasters, a fanlight, a frieze and a cornice on consoles. Above the shopfront is a canted bay window, and the other windows are sashes, the window above the doorway with a moulded architrave with a frieze and a cornice.
45 and 47 High Street, Pateley Bridge; 54.08663°N 1.75832°W		Mid 18th century	A house, with a shop to the left, in stone on a plinth, with quoins, a sill band, an eaves band, a moulded cornice and a stone slate roof. There are two storeys and three bays. On the left is a shopfront with pilasters, a frieze and a cornice. To the right is a doorway, over which is a blind semicircular recess, flanked by casement windows, forming a Venetian window composition. In the middle of the upper floor is a blind window flanked by casements.
Lupton Fold Farmhouse, Wath; 54.10140°N 1.77213°W		Mid to late 18th century	Two cottages combined into a farmhouse, it is in stone with quoins and a stone slate roof. There are three storeys and three bays. In the centre is a porch and a double doorcase, the right part blocked. The windows in the lower two floors are casements, and in the top floor are lunettes.
Fell Beck House, near Fellbeck; 54.08552°N 1.70289°W		Late 18th century	The farmhouse is in stone, with quoins, an eaves band, and a slate roof with stone slate eaves courses, shaped kneelers, and stone coping. There are three storeys and three bays. The doorway has a plain surround and a fanlight. The windows in the lower two floors are sashes, and in the top floor is a casement window flanked by blocked openings.
Hawkridge House, Pateley Bridge; 54.08849°N 1.75849°W		Late 18th century	The house is in stone, with quoins, square eaves modillions, and a stone slate roof with shaped kneelers and stone coping. There are three storeys and two bays. The doorway has a plain surround and a fanlight, and the windows are sashes with raised surrounds.
Kiln Hill Farmhouse, Blazefield Bank; 54.08027°N 1.73707°W		Late 18th century	The house is in stone, with quoins, and a stone slate roof with shaped kneelers and stone coping. There are two storeys and three bays. The central doorway has quoined jambs, and a radial fanlight with Gothic tracery and a keystone, and the windows are sashes in plain surrounds.
Pateley Bridge; 54.08550°N 1.76106°W		Late 18th century	The bridge carries the B6165 road over the River Nidd. It is in stone and consists of three segmental arches. The bridge has pointed cutwaters that rise as pilaster buttresses with flat coping, recessed voussoirs, and a raised band at road level.
Smelthouses Bridge; 54.07407°N 1.70786°W	—	Late 18th century	The bridge carries a road over Fell Beck. It is in stone, and consists of a single large segmental arch flanked by pilasters. The bridge has a projecting band and plain coped parapets.
Sugar Hills Cottage, near Fellbeck; 54.08989°N 1.69142°W	—	Late 18th century	The house is in stone, with quoins, and a stone slate roof with stone coping. There are two storeys, two bays, a single-storey outbuilding on the left, and a later rear wing. The doorway has a plain surround, there is one casement window, the other windows are horizontally-sliding sashes, and all the windows have plain surrounds and keystones.
Glasshouses Mill; 54.07490°N 1.73888°W		1812–14	A watermill that was extended and later converted for other uses. It is in sandstone, with quoins, roofs of slate, stone slate and tile, and it is in two and three storeys. There is a U-shaped plan with three ranges around a courtyard. The central range has twelve bays, the west wing has nine bays and six to the north, and the east wing has 15 bays and an extension, and there are detached subsidiary buildings. The central block has a three-bay extension with a clock and a bell tower.
St Cuthbert's Church, Pateley Bridge; 54.08785°N 1.75840°W		1825–27	The church is in stone with a slate roof, and consists of a nave, north and south porches, a chancel and a west tower. The tower has three stages, angle buttresses, a plinth, triple-chamfered bands, a west doorway with a pointed head, a fanlight, a chamfered surround and a hood mould. Above is a clock face in a diamond-shaped tablet, windows with pointed heads, three-light bell openings, a moulded cornice, and an embattled parapet with corner pinnacles.
8 High Street, Pateley Bridge; 54.08609°N 1.75991°W		Early 19th century	The building, formerly Hagenbachs Bakery, is in stone on a plinth, with a moulded cornice and a hipped slate roof. There are three storeys, one bay on the front facing the street, and three on the left return. Facing the street is a shopfront containing a bow window with a window to the left, grooved columns, a frieze and a cornice, above which are sash windows. In the right side bay is a doorway with a fanlight, grooved columns, a frieze and a cornice, in the centre is a doorway with a reeded surround, corner paterae and a cornice, and further to the left is a sash window with a flat arch with voussoirs. The upper floors contain sash windows with wedge lintels.
41 and 43 High Street, Pateley Bridge; 54.08658°N 1.75854°W		Early 19th century	Two shops on a corner site in stone with a slate roof, hipped to the left. There are three storeys and four bays, the left bay forming a semicircular corner containing a curved window in each floor. To the right is a shopfront with pilasters, and a frieze and a cornice on consoles. Above it is a canted bay window with a frieze and a cornice. Further to the right is a bow window, sash windows and a doorway with a fanlight, and elsewhere, there are more sash windows.
The Crown, Pateley Bridge; 54.08624°N 1.75991°W		Early 19th century	The public house is in stone, with a moulded eaves cornice, and a tile roof with shaped kneelers and stone coping. There are two storeys and three bays. The central doorway has pilasters, a fanlight, a cornice and a projecting pediment. This is flanked by tripartite sash windows, and in the upper floor are sash windows with semicircular blind recesses above.
Milepost north of Cliff Top House, near Blazefield; 54.08373°N 1.71184°W		Mid 19th century	The milepost on the southeast side of the B6265 road is in cast iron. It has a triangular plan and a sloping top. On the top is inscribed the distance to Skipton, on the left side is the distance to Pateley Bridge, and on the right side to Ripon.
Milepost south of Blazefield; 54.08147°N 1.73549°W		Mid 19th century	The milepost on the southeast side of the B6265 road is in cast iron. It has a triangular plan and a sloping top. On the top is inscribed the distance to Skipton, on the left side is the distance to Pateley Bridge, and on the right side to Ripon.
Pump, High Street, Pateley Bridge; 54.08674°N 1.75769°W		1852	The pump is in stone, with walls on three sides, and a triangular pediment containing the date. In front is a stone trough, over which are cast iron spouts in the form of a fox's head.
Wath Methodist Church; 54.10488°N 1.77491°W		1859–60	The church is in limestone, with a Welsh slate roof, and a stone ridge and hips. It has an irregular pentagon plan with a single cell. The doorway has a round-arched head with a keystone, above which is a datestone and an octagonal clock face with Roman numerals. The windows are also round-arched.
