= St Mary's Church, Pateley Bridge =

Ruined church in North Yorkshire, England

Coordinates: 54°05′07″N 1°45′07″W

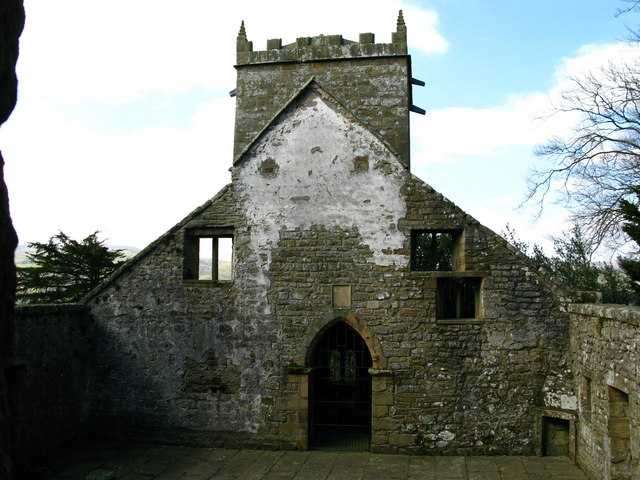
The church, in 2009

St Mary's Church is a ruined Anglican church in Pateley Bridge, a town in North Yorkshire, in England.

The church stands on high ground in an area known as Church Green, about 0.5 mile east of the town. The first church on the site was built in the 13th century, possibly near the site of the original settlement of Pateley. The oldest part of the current building is the tower, which was erected in 1691. The nave was built in the 18th century. In 1827, the church was closed, and St Cuthbert's, Pateley Bridge was opened nearer the centre of the town. St Mary's Church fell into ruin, but the remains were grade II listed on 6 May 1967. On 15 December 1976 it became a scheduled monument.

The church is built of stone, and consists of a nave without a roof, a south porch, and a west tower. The tower has three stages, a plinth, quoins, a mullioned window, three one-light openings, round-arched bell openings, a moulded band, and an embattled parapet with corner pinnacles.

== See also ==
- Listed buildings in High and Low Bishopside
