= Lofthouse-in-Nidderdale railway station =

Disused railway station in North Yorkshire, England

Lofthouse-in-Nidderdale

General information
- Location: Lofthouse, Nidderdale; North Yorkshire; England
- Coordinates: 54.155°N 1.845°W
- System: Light railway
- Platforms: 1
- Tracks: 2

Key dates
- 12 July 1904: Opened to workers
- 12 September 1907: Open to the public as Lofthouse
- 12 December 1907: Renamed Lofthouse-in-Nidderdale
- 1 January 1930: Closed to passengers
- March 1930: Closed to goods traffic
Location

Lofthouse-in-Nidderdale railway station was the northernmost regular passenger terminus on the Nidd Valley Light Railway (NVLR), in Lofthouse, then in the West Riding of Yorkshire and now in North Yorkshire, (Note: Lofthouse, and all the other stations on the Nidd Valley Light Railway, were in the West Riding of Yorkshire, and were closed in the 1930s. In 1974, the region was moved into North Yorkshire.) England. The station was built as part of Bradford Corporation's programme of reservoir building in the Upper Nidd Valley. The station opened in 1904 and was closed to passengers in 1930. The station was renamed Lofthouse-in-Nidderdale railway station in 1907 to avoid confusion with Lofthouse and Outwood railway station, also in the West Riding of Yorkshire.

== History ==
Lofthouse was the first station on the line to be used, as it was a transshipment point between road and rail for the 6-mile (9.7 km) line from Lofthouse up the valley in connection with the building of the reservoirs. A 3 ft (914 mm) gauge railway was built between Angram Reservoir and Lofthouse village in the summer of 1904, extending south of the future station site by 1/2 mile (0.8 km).

The station was 6 miles (9.7 km) up the valley from Pateley Bridge station, and was also a similar distance from Angram Reservoir, however Lofthouse served as the terminus of public passenger traffic. Lofthouse had its passenger service inaugurated on 12 September 1907, but a celebratory special working had traversed the line from Pateley Bridge to Lofthouse the day before. The station layout consisted of a single platform on the eastern side, with a passing loop for freight services. The station also had a goods shed and two sidings on the western side, next to the River Nidd. The Crown Inn public house, adjacent to what would become the station building, was extended in the early 1910s to become the station hotel.

The signalling was undertaken by a ground frame located on the single platform. Although Lofthouse was the terminus of the regular passenger line, passenger trains for those employed on the reservoir workings up valley (and their families) were laid on from Lofthouse.

The last NVLR passenger train from Pateley Bridge ran in December 1929, with official closure of the station to passengers on 1 January 1930, and to goods traffic at the end of March 1930. However, the line remained open for another seven years as freight traffic still ran up the valley to the reservoir construction sites. The railway building survives as a private residence, and the railway bridge to the immediate north of the station now functions as the main road bridge in the village across the River Nidd.

== Notes ==
Preceding station	Disused railways	Following station
Ramsgill; Line and station closed	Nidd Valley Light Railway	Terminus
