= Ramsgill railway station =

Disused railway station in North Yorkshire, England

Ramsgill
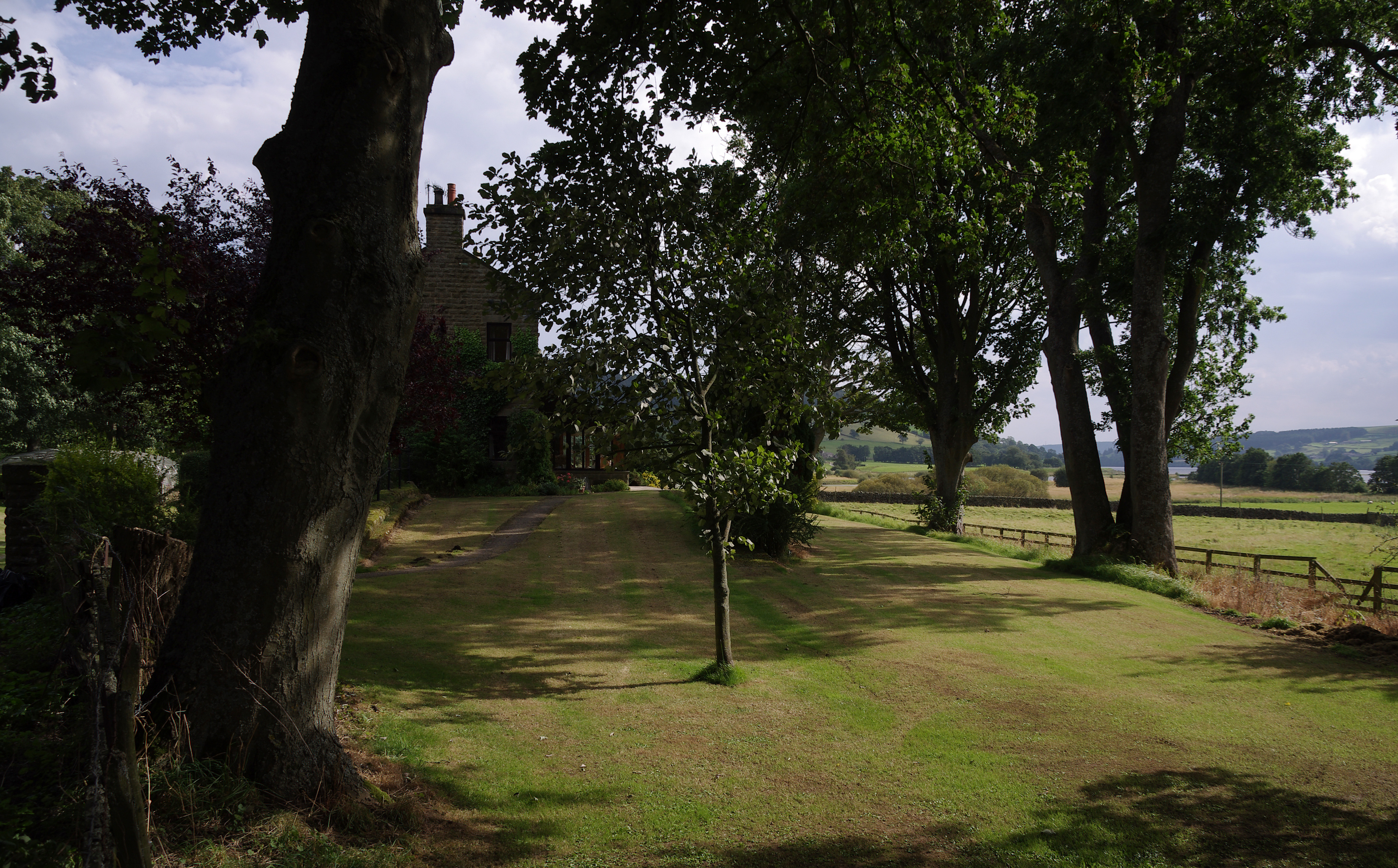
- The station is now a private residence.

General information
- Location: Bouthwaite, North Yorkshire; England
- Coordinates: 54.1360°N 1.8155°W
- Platforms: 1

Other information
- Status: Disused

History
- Post-grouping: Nidd Valley Light Railway

Key dates
- 11 September 1907: Opened
- 1 January 1930: Closed
Location

Ramsgill railway station was a station on the Nidd Valley Light Railway in Nidderdale in Yorkshire, England. It opened in 1907 and closed in 1930. It was located in Bouthwaite, 0.3 miles (0.5 km) from the village of Ramsgill, then in the West Riding of Yorkshire but now in North Yorkshire. The station is now a private residence, though the platform can still be seen.

Preceding station	Disused railways	Following station
Wath-in-Nidderdale; Line and station closed	Nidd Valley Light Railway	Lofthouse-in-Nidderdale; Line and station closed
