= Thomas Hewes =

British millwright

Thomas Cheek Hewes (1768 – 26 January 1832) was an English millwright, textile machine manufacturer and civil engineer professionally active from 1790 to 1830,

== Early life ==
Hewes was born in Beckenham, Kent, the son of Joseph Hewes, a farmer from Walthamstow. In 1782, Hewes became an apprentice for Thomas Cheek. In 1806, he married Anne Jamet, born to French Huguenots. They had two sons, Jamet Thomas Hewes (1808– 1876) and Jacob Arthur Hewes (1816–1824).

== Early works ==
Hewes installed the Boulton and Watt steam engine and associated millwork in McConnel and Kennedy's Old Mill, Ancoats in 1797.

== Water wheels ==
In 1802 he was involved in building the mill, supplying the spinning machinery and erecting a 40 ft diameter iron water-wheel at George Allman's cotton mill in Bandon, County Cork, Ireland. It is speculated that he used iron in these mills in an early attempt at fireproof construction. The water wheel at Bandon was of iron- but in 1805 he built a wheel at Darley with a cast iron axle. He was involved in Belper in 1811 improving and replacing the wooden wheels used by Arkwright and Strutt. These wheels were suspension wheels 21 ft 6in in diameter and 15 ft in width. The wheel were rim-drivenThe spokes were 1.5 inches (3.8 cm) in diameter. The Belper wheel was controlled by a governor.

He supplied a wheel to Quarry Bank Mill in 1807, which he repaired in 1815 and in 1819 designed and installed the Great Wheel.
