= Fountains Earth =

Civil parish in Harrogate, North Yorkshire, England

Coordinates: 54.1499°N 1.8054°W

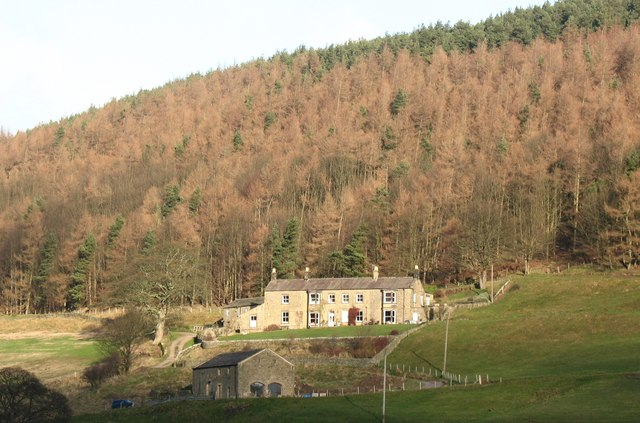
- Longside House

- Location within North Yorkshire
- Population: 197 (2011 census)
- Civil parish: Fountains Earth
- Unitary authority: North Yorkshire
- Ceremonial county: North Yorkshire
- Region: Yorkshire and the Humber
- Country: England
- Sovereign state: United Kingdom
- Police: North Yorkshire
- Fire: North Yorkshire
- Ambulance: Yorkshire

Fountains Earth is a civil parish in the county of North Yorkshire, England. The principal village in the parish is Lofthouse, and the parish also includes the hamlet of Bouthwaite and the northern part of the village of Wath. The population of the parish in the 2011 census was 197.

The parish occupies the eastern side of upper Nidderdale. It is bounded on the west by the River Nidd and Gouthwaite Reservoir, which separate the parish from Stonebeck Up and Stonebeck Down. In Wath, at the southern end of the parish, a stream known as Dauber Gill separates the parish from High and Low Bishopside. To the north and east large areas of grouse moor extend into the neighbouring parishes of Ilton cum Pott and Laverton.

Historically Fountains Earth was a township in the ancient parish of Kirkby Malzeard in the West Riding of Yorkshire. The township took its name from Fountains Abbey, which owned the land in the Middle Ages and established granges at Lofthouse, Bouthwaite and other places in the township. Fountains Earth became a civil parish in 1866. From 1974 to 2023 it was part of the Borough of Harrogate, it is now administered by the unitary North Yorkshire Council. The parish now shares the Upper Nidderdale grouped parish council with the parishes of Stonebeck Down and Stonebeck Up.

== See also ==
- Listed buildings in Fountains Earth
