= Heathfield, North Yorkshire =

Hamlet in North Yorkshire, England

Coordinates: 54.100°N 1.787°W

Heathfield
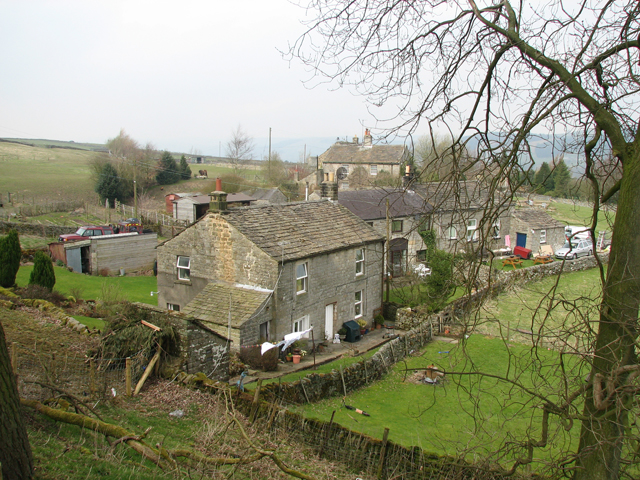
- Heathfield in 2006

- Location within North Yorkshire
- OS grid reference: SE138672
- Civil parish: Stonebeck Down
- Unitary authority: North Yorkshire
- Ceremonial county: North Yorkshire
- Region: Yorkshire and the Humber
- Country: England
- Sovereign state: United Kingdom
- Post town: HARROGATE
- Postcode district: HG3
- Dialling code: 01423
- Police: North Yorkshire
- Fire: North Yorkshire
- Ambulance: Yorkshire
- UK Parliament: Skipton and Ripon

Heathfield is a hamlet in the civil parish of Stonebeck Down in upper Nidderdale, in North Yorkshire, England. It lies on a broad terrace on the west side of the dale, overlooking a steep slope down to the River Nidd.

Heathfield was first recorded in Domesday Book as Higrefeld. The name is derived from Old English, and means "open land frequented by jays". By the 17th century the name had become Hearfield, and in the 18th century was recorded as Heathfield. In the Middle Ages the land was owned by Byland Abbey, which mined lead and established a grange there.

Heathfield Moor rises west of the hamlet, and is managed for grouse shooting.

== See also ==
- Listed buildings in Stonebeck Down
