= Listed buildings in Stonebeck Down =

Stonebeck Down is a civil parish in the county of North Yorkshire, England. It contains ten listed buildings that are recorded in the National Heritage List for England. All the listed buildings are designated at Grade II, the lowest of the three grades, which is applied to "buildings of national importance and special interest". The parish contains the village of Ramsgill, the hamlets of Stean and Heathfield, and the surrounding countryside. The listed buildings consist of houses, farmhouses and farm buildings, a church and the remains of a medieval chapel in the churchyard.

== Buildings ==
Name and location	Photograph	Date	Notes
Remains of St Mary's chapel 54.13412°N 1.81828°W		Medieval	Originally a grange of Byland Abbey, now a ruin. It is in stone, and consists of a stone coped gabled wall, containing two short lancet windows, and a larger one above.
Colthouse Grange Farm and outbuildings 54.12310°N 1.81217°W	—	17th century	The farmhouse is in stone, and has a stone slate roof with stone coped gables and shaped kneelers. There are two storeys, a double depth plan and three bays. The central doorway has a quoined surround and a narrow hood mould. The windows on the front are sashes, those in the ground floor with hood moulds. At the rear is a mullioned window, and a doorway with a chamfered surround and a triangular head. A tall yard wall at the rear connects the house to the outbuildings, which consist of a two-storey barn with external steps, and a pig sty with troughs.
Gouthwaite Farmhouse; 54.11344°N 1.80289°W		17th century	The farmhouse, which was rebuilt and relocated in 1900 following the building of the Gouthwaite Reservoir, is in stone, and has a stone slate roof with stone coping and kneelers. There are two storeys and attics, and three bays, the middle bay projecting and gabled. The right bay contains a doorway with a chamfered surround, a four-centred arched head and a hood mould. The windows are mullioned with up to eight lights.
Gouthwaite Hall; 54.11205°N 1.79948°W		17th century	The house, which was rebuilt and relocated in 1900 following the building of the Gouthwaite Reservoir, is in stone, and has a roof of stone slate with stone coping. It has one storey and attics, and three bays, the middle and right bays projecting and gabled. On the right of the middle bay is a doorway with a chamfered surround and a four-centred arch. The windows are mullioned and transomed with hood moulds.
Heathfield Grange; 54.10145°N 1.79002°W		17th century	The house is in stone with a stone slate roof. There are two storeys and three bays. The right bay has a doorway with a chamfered surround and a four-centred arched lintel, and to the left is an inserted doorway. The is one single light window, and the others are mullioned.
Stripe House Farmhouse and barn 54.10737°N 1.78663°W		Late 17th century	The farmhouse and attached barn are in stone, with quoins, and roofs of Welsh slate and stone slate with stone coping and kneelers. They have two storeys, and the house has two bays, a central doorway with a plain surround, and mullioned windows. The barn has three bays and external steps on the left, and it contains doorways and mullioned windows.
Heys Cottage and barn 54.13434°N 1.81872°W	—	1692	The house is in stone, with a stone slate roof, two storeys and two bays. On the right bay is a doorway with a chamfered surround, and a basket-arched dated and initialled lintel. To its right is a small casement window, and the other windows are mullioned. Attached on the right is a barn containing a doorway with a quoined surround and slit vents.
Spring Hill Farmhouse and barn 54.10131°N 1.78670°W	—	1811	The farmhouse is in stone, and has a stone slate roof with stone coping and shaped kneelers. There are two storeys and two bays. In the centre is a gabled porch, and on its right return is a doorway with a dated and initialled lintel. The windows are mullioned and contain casements. Projecting at a right angle from the left of the farmhouse is a barn containing a doorway.
Ivy House Farmhouse; 54.09749°N 1.77868°W		Early 19th century	The farmhouse is in stone, with quoins, and a stone slate roof with stone coping on the left. There are two storeys and three bays. In the centre is a gabled porch and a doorway with a plain surround, and the windows are sashes in plain surrounds.
St Mary's Church, Ramsgill; 54.13402°N 1.81855°W		1842	The church is built in stone, it has a slate roof, and consists of a nave and a west tower. The tower has three stages, diagonal buttresses, a west doorway with a pointed arch and a hood mould, lancet windows, clock faces, chamfered bands, two-light bell openings with hood moulds, and an embattled parapet with corner pinnacles. On the body of the church are lancet windows with hood moulds.
