= Wath-in-Nidderdale =

Village in North Yorkshire, England

Coordinates: 54°06′20″N 1°46′33″W

Wath
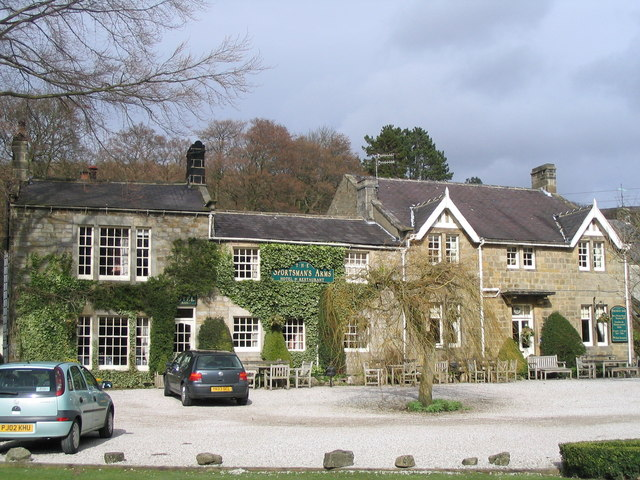
- Sportsman's Arms, Wath

- Location within North Yorkshire
- OS grid reference: SE148677
- Unitary authority: North Yorkshire
- Ceremonial county: North Yorkshire
- Region: Yorkshire and the Humber
- Country: England
- Sovereign state: United Kingdom
- Post town: HARROGATE
- Postcode district: HG3
- Dialling code: 01423
- Police: North Yorkshire
- Fire: North Yorkshire
- Ambulance: Yorkshire

Wath, sometimes known as Wath-in-Nidderdale to distinguish it from other places named Wath, is a village in the county of North Yorkshire, England. It is near Gouthwaite Reservoir and about 3 miles (4.8 km) north of Pateley Bridge.

The toponym is derived from the Old Norse vað, meaning "ford".

In the Middle Ages Wath was divided between the lands of Fountains Abbey, north of a small stream known as Dauber Gill, and the lands of the Archbishop of York on the south side. The northern part, including the Sportsman's Arms inn, is now in the civil parish of Fountains Earth, historically a township in the parish of Kirkby Malzeard. The southern and higher part is now in the civil parish of High and Low Bishopside, historically a township in the parish of Ripon. From 1974 to 2023 it was part of the Borough of Harrogate, it is now administered by the unitary North Yorkshire Council.

Sigsworth Grange was a grange of Fountains Abbey. The present building on the site of the grange dates from the early 18th century.

The small Wath Methodist Chapel in the upper part of the village, has an unusual 5-sided shape. It was built in 1859, and was designated a Grade II listed building in 2018.

The ford over the River Nidd, which gave the place its name, was replaced by a bridge by the 16th century. The present bridge, a narrow road bridge, dates from the early 19th century and is a Grade II listed building. In the early 20th century Wath had a railway station on the Nidd Valley Light Railway.

== See also ==
- Listed buildings in Fountains Earth
- Listed buildings in High and Low Bishopside
