= Wath Methodist Chapel =

Church in North Yorkshire, England

Coordinates: 54°06′17″N 1°46′30″W

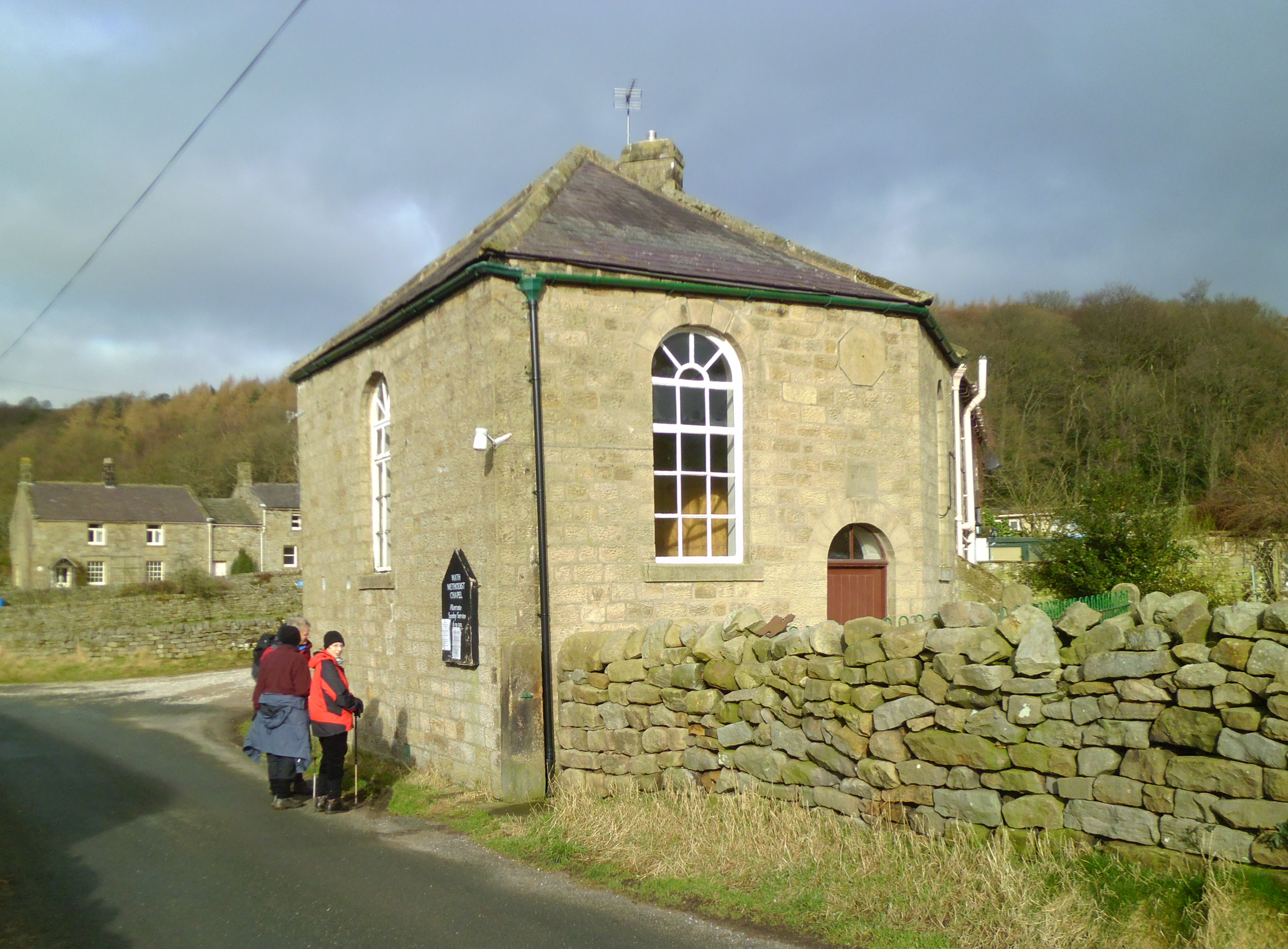
The chapel, in 2013

Wath Methodist Chapel is a Methodist church in Wath, a hamlet in Nidderdale in North Yorkshire, in England.

Methodism gained many adherents in Nidderdale in the latter half of the 18th century, and societies were formed in several places in the dale. In 1812 Jonathan Lupton formed a society in Wath. The chapel was constructed between 1859 and 1860, probably to a design by the local architects, Messrs Thorpe. In plan, it is an irregular pentagon, designed to fill the available site, at the end of a terrace of cottages. Its floorplan is only 27 square metres, but it is able to seat more than 100 worshippers. The chapel was renovated in 1907, and again from 1948 to 1949, but is largely unchanged. It was grade II listed in 2018.

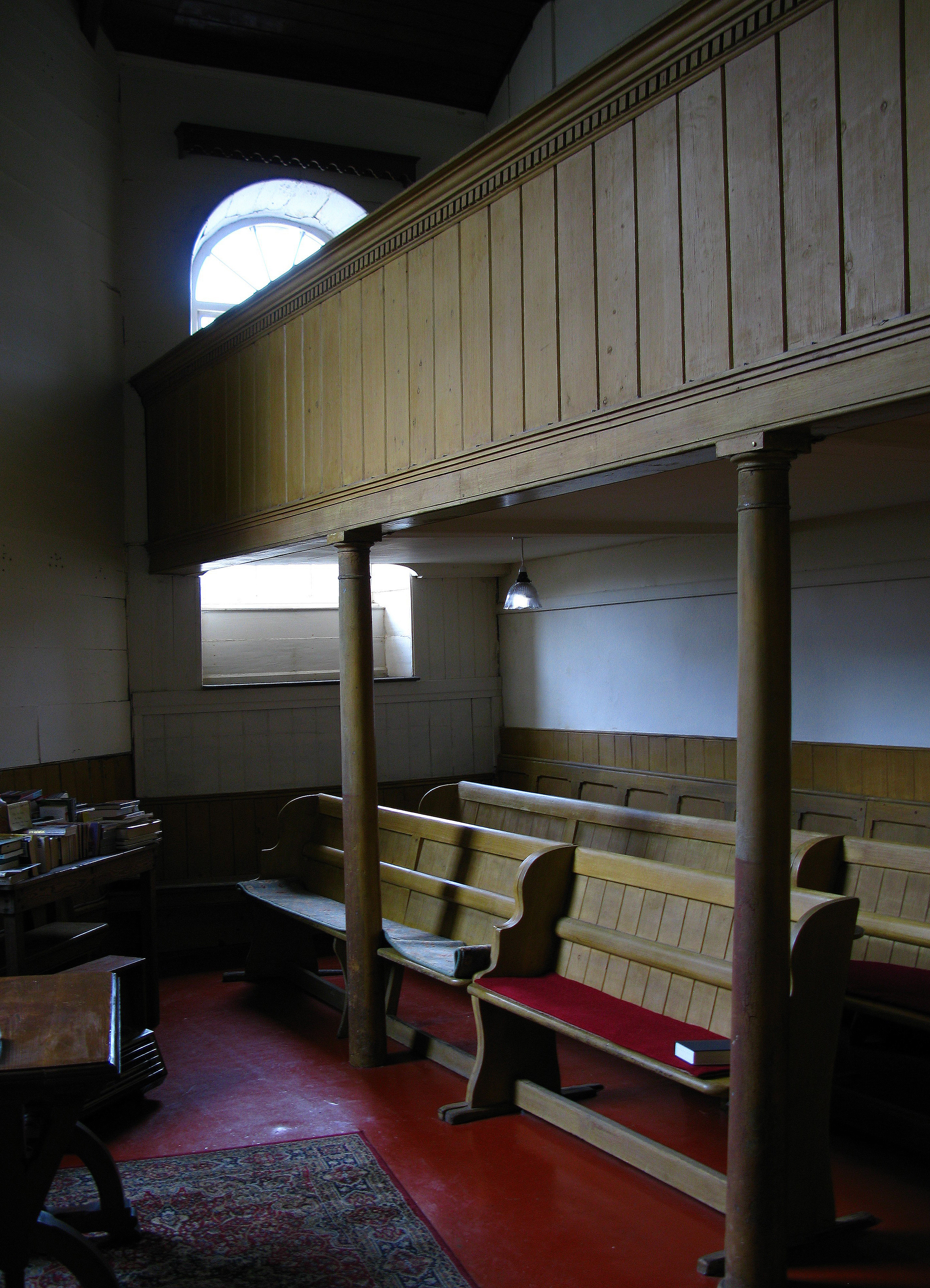
The interior

The chapel is in limestone, with a Welsh slate roof, and a stone ridge and hips. The doorway has a round-arched head with a keystone, above which is a datestone and an octagonal clock face with Roman numerals. The windows are also round-arched. Inside, there is a single room with wooden pews and a raked balcony, facing a pulpit. The walls and ceiling are timber boarded.

== See also ==
- Listed buildings in High and Low Bishopside
