= Wilsill =

Village in North Yorkshire, England

Coordinates: 54.076750°N 1.720910°W

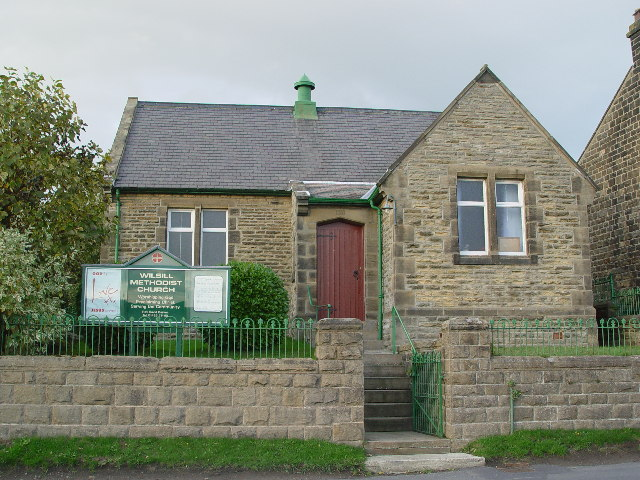
- Wilsill's Methodist Church

- Location within North Yorkshire
- OS grid reference: SE183645
- Civil parish: High and Low Bishopside
- Unitary authority: North Yorkshire
- Ceremonial county: North Yorkshire
- Region: Yorkshire and the Humber
- Country: England
- Sovereign state: United Kingdom
- Post town: HARROGATE
- Postcode district: HG3
- Police: North Yorkshire
- Fire: North Yorkshire
- Ambulance: Yorkshire

Wilsill is a village in Nidderdale in the county of North Yorkshire, England. It is about 2 miles (3 km) east of Pateley Bridge on the B6165 road between Pateley Bridge and Ripley. In 2016, Harrogate Borough Council estimated the population as being 176.

The village appears in the Domesday Book as Wifelshale, where it was listed as having 18 villagers, 40 ploughlands and belonging to the Archbishop of York. The name of the village derives from a personal name (Wifel) and the Old English Halh, which means corner of land.

Until 1974 it was part of the West Riding of Yorkshire. From 1974 to 2023 it was part of the Borough of Harrogate, it is now administered by the unitary North Yorkshire Council.

The village has a Methodist chapel, an Anglican church (St Michael and All Angels) and a public house (The Birch Tree Inn). The village is served by an eight times daily bus service between Pateley Bridge and Harrogate. Although the railway between Harrogate and Pateley Bridge went through the southern part of the villages' location, it was not furnished with a railway station.

== See also ==
- Listed buildings in High and Low Bishopside
