= Stonebeck Down =

Civil parish in North Yorkshire, England

Coordinates: 54°8′N 1°52′W

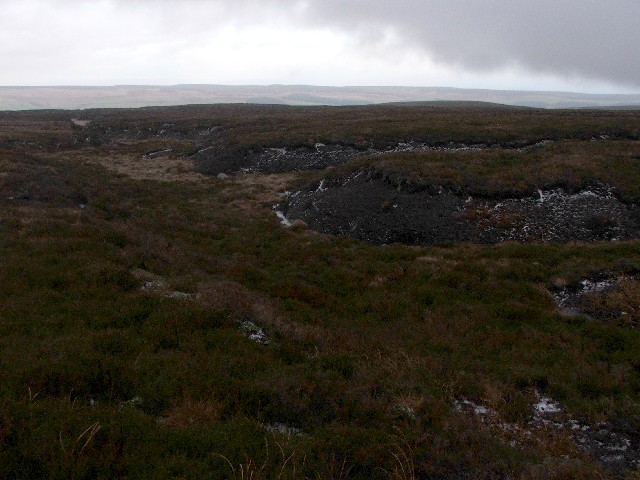
- Stean Moor, a moorland in the parish

- Location within North Yorkshire
- Population: 192 (2011 census)
- Civil parish: Stonebeck Down
- Unitary authority: North Yorkshire
- Ceremonial county: North Yorkshire
- Region: Yorkshire and the Humber
- Country: England
- Sovereign state: United Kingdom
- Police: North Yorkshire
- Fire: North Yorkshire
- Ambulance: Yorkshire

Stonebeck Down is a civil parish in the county of North Yorkshire, England. The main settlements in the parish are the village of Ramsgill and the hamlets of Stean and Heathfield. The population of the parish in the 2011 census was 192.

The parish occupies the west side of upper Nidderdale. It is bounded on the north by Stean Beck, from which the parish takes its name (stean being a dialect form of "stone"), and which separates it from the parish of Stonebeck Up. To the west it is bounded by the ridge separating Nidderdale from Wharfedale, to the south by Ashfold Gill, separating the parish from Bewerley, and to the east by the River Nidd and Gouthwaite Reservoir, which separate the parish from Fountains Earth. The parish includes large areas of grouse moor, rising to the remote peak of Meugher.

Historically Stonebeck Down was a township in the ancient parish of Kirkby Malzeard in the West Riding of Yorkshire. In the Middle Ages, it formed part of the lands of Byland Abbey, which established granges in the dale. Stonebeck Down became a separate civil parish in 1866, and was transferred from the West Riding to North Yorkshire in 1974. From 1974 to 2023 it was part of the Borough of Harrogate. It is now administered by the unitary North Yorkshire Council. The parish now shares the Upper Nidderdale grouped parish council with the parishes of Stonebeck Up and Fountains Earth.

== See also ==
- Listed buildings in Stonebeck Down
