= Pateley Bridge railway station (Nidd Valley Light Railway) =

Disused railway station in Pateley Bridge, North Yorkshire, England

Pateley Bridge NVLR

General information
- Location: Pateley Bridge; North Yorkshire; England
- Coordinates: 54.088°N 1.762°W
- System: Light rail
- Platforms: 2

History
- Opened: 12 September 1907
- Closed: 1 January 1930
- Original company: Nidd Valley Light Railway
Location

Pateley Bridge railway station (NVLR) was a railway station serving the southern terminus of the Nidd Valley Light Railway, in Pateley Bridge, North Yorkshire, England. The railway was built to enable the construction of reservoirs in the Upper Nidd Valley by the Bradford Corporation. The station opened to passengers in September 1907, and closed in January 1930, however, the adjacent line remained open for the transfer of goods traffic until 1937.

== History ==
The station at the southern end of the Nidd Valley Light Railway (NVLR) was referred to as either Pateley Bridge NVLR, or Pateley Bridge (Nidd). It was opened to traffic on 12 September 1907, and had one main platform, with a second on the southern side, and even though a physical link existed between Pateley Bridge NVLR and the North Eastern Railway's (NER) Pateley Bridge station, passengers had to de-train and travel the short distance between the two (about 400 yards (370 m)).

Pateley Bridge NVLR was the main station on the line and was equipped with a small goods shed to the east of the station platform, a carriage shed and depot to the north, and a signal box at the station's northern throat. In 1908, the wooden shed containing the contractor's engines burnt down. This was replaced by an iron-built shed made by the Bradford Corporation. The exchange sidings with the NER line was to the west of the station. The signal box was at Pateley Bridge was the only one on the line, with a signalling contract worth over £430. The other three passengers stations on the line operated their points and signals from a ground frame that was located on the station platform.

Two lines connected with the NER railway; one diverging off the incline up to Scotgate Ash Quarry, and the other leading to a three-road exchange yard. The station building, a two-storey structure, was built at a 90-degree angle to the station platforms and still stands to this day. A stationmaster, Ted Fawcett, was appointed in September 1907, and served until his death in February 1929.

Passenger services varied over the years, with four out and back workings between Pateley Bridge and Lofthouse in 1912, which took 20 minutes each way. This was reduced to just three trains during the First World War, when the trains were combined as a passenger and freight service. Between 1922 and 1927, the pattern had been extended to five daily out and back services, with journey times northwards (up valley) taking 25 minutes, and the return down the valley taking only 20 minutes.

The station was closed in January 1930 as a result of falling passenger numbers; records show that over 63,000 people travelled on the line in 1923, which had dropped to 25,000 in the year before closure (1929). However, the line remained open to carry freight to and from the dam workings up the valley until 1936, when the whole line from Angram Dam to Pateley Bridge NVLR and the exchange sidings was lifted. In 1937, the agreement with the LNER (the successors to the NER) for the exchange of freight between the NVLR and the Nidd Valley Railway, was terminated.

Preceding station	Disused railways	Following station
Terminus	Nidd Valley Light Railway	Wath-in-Nidderdale; Line and station closed
