= Yorke Arms =

English Restaurant and Hotel

Coordinates: 54.134°N 1.820°W

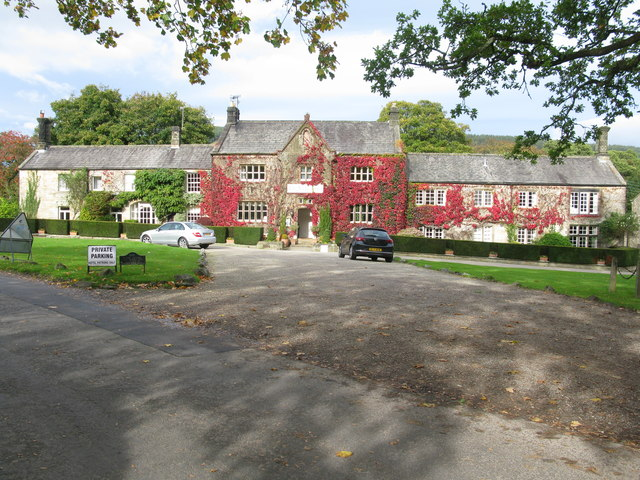
The Yorke Arms at Ramsgill

The Yorke Arms is a luxury events venue in Ramsgill, Nidderdale, in the Yorkshire Dales in northern England.

The building began life as a shooting lodge for the Yorke family. In 1842 it was rebuilt as a small inn, and by 1924 it had acquired a reputation as an eating establishment. From 2003 to 2019 the restaurant held one star in the Michelin Guide. The Yorke Arms closed as a restaurant and hotel in 2020.

When it was still a restaurant the Yorke Arms featured in The Trip, a 2010 BBC comedy starring Steve Coogan and Rob Brydon as fictionalised versions of themselves doing a restaurant tour of northern England.
