= Glasshouses Mill =

Watermill in North Yorkshire, England

Coordinates: 54°04′30″N 1°44′20″W

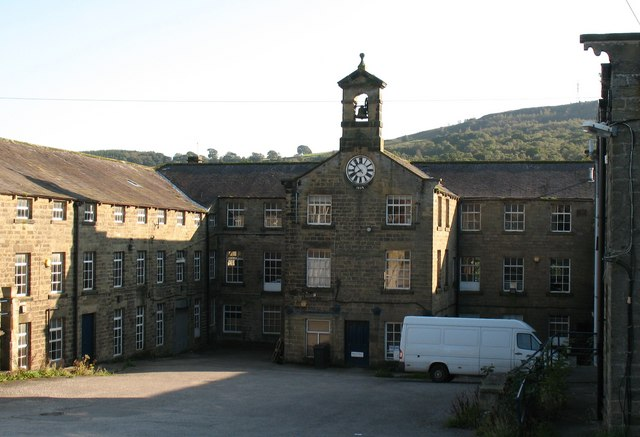
The mill, in 2008

Glasshouses Mill is a historic building in Glasshouses, North Yorkshire, a village in England.

The watermill was built between 1812 and 1814 to spin flax, on the site of a corn mill. In 1835, it was purchased by the Metcalfe family, who added east and west wings, followed by a warehouse and offices in 1844, and a further warehouse in 1852. In 1851, a larger watermill was installed, designed by William Fairbairn & Sons and fed by a 10 million gallon reservoir. In 1857 a steam engine was installed, followed by a gas plant in 1864, and a water turbine in 1871. In 1878, a boiler house and joiners' shop were constructed. Several other buildings were constructed in the period, to designs by W. R. Corson, including housing, a school and chapel.

In 1899, the mill was converted to spin hemp, and in 1912 it was purchased by the Atkinson family. The mill closed in 1972, and was converted to house various small businesses. It was grade II listed in 2007. In 2016, work began to convert it into housing.

The mill is built of sandstone, with quoins, roofs of slate, stone slate and tile, and it is in two and three storeys. There is a U-shaped plan with three ranges around a courtyard. The central range has twelve bays, the west wing has nine bays and six to the north, and the east wing has 15 bays and an extension, and there are detached subsidiary buildings. The central block has a three-bay extension with a clock and a bell tower.

== See also ==
- Listed buildings in High and Low Bishopside
