= Ramsgill =

Village in North Yorkshire, England

Coordinates: 54°08′05″N 1°49′12″W

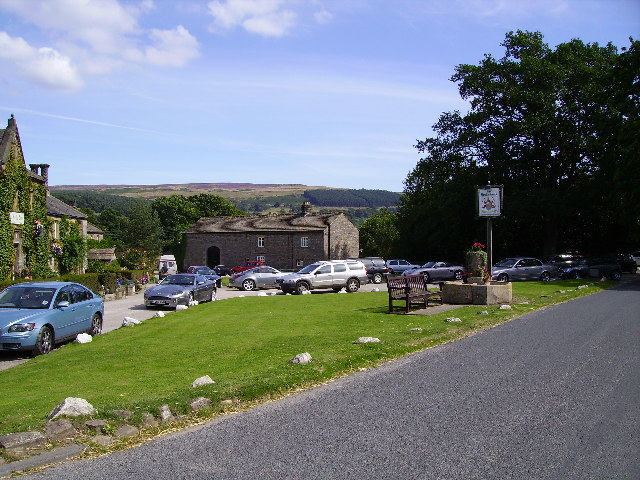
- The Yorke Arms, Ramsgill

- Location within North Yorkshire
- OS grid reference: SE118711
- Civil parish: Stonebeck Down
- Unitary authority: North Yorkshire
- Ceremonial county: North Yorkshire
- Region: Yorkshire and the Humber
- Country: England
- Sovereign state: United Kingdom
- Post town: HARROGATE
- Postcode district: HG3
- Police: North Yorkshire
- Fire: North Yorkshire
- Ambulance: Yorkshire
- UK Parliament: Skipton and Ripon

Ramsgill is a small village in Nidderdale, North Yorkshire, England, about 2 miles (3.2 km) south-east of Lofthouse, located near Gouthwaite Reservoir. It is chiefly known for the Yorke Arms, formerly a Michelin-starred restaurant on the village green which takes its name from the lords of the manor, the Yorke family, who once lived in nearby Gouthwaite Hall. The Yorke Arms is now an event venue.

St Mary's Church, Ramsgill was built in 1842, near to the remains of a Grade II listed medieval chapel which was originally part of a large grange built by the monks of Byland Abbey.

Ramsgill had a railway station on the Nidd Valley Light Railway, located in the hamlet of Bouthwaite. It opened in 1907 and closed in 1930.

The murderer Eugene Aram was born in Ramsgill.

== See also ==
- Listed buildings in Stonebeck Down
