= St Andrew's Church, Burnt Yates =

Church in Burnt Yates, North Yorkshire, England

Coordinates: 54.0458°N 1.6177°W

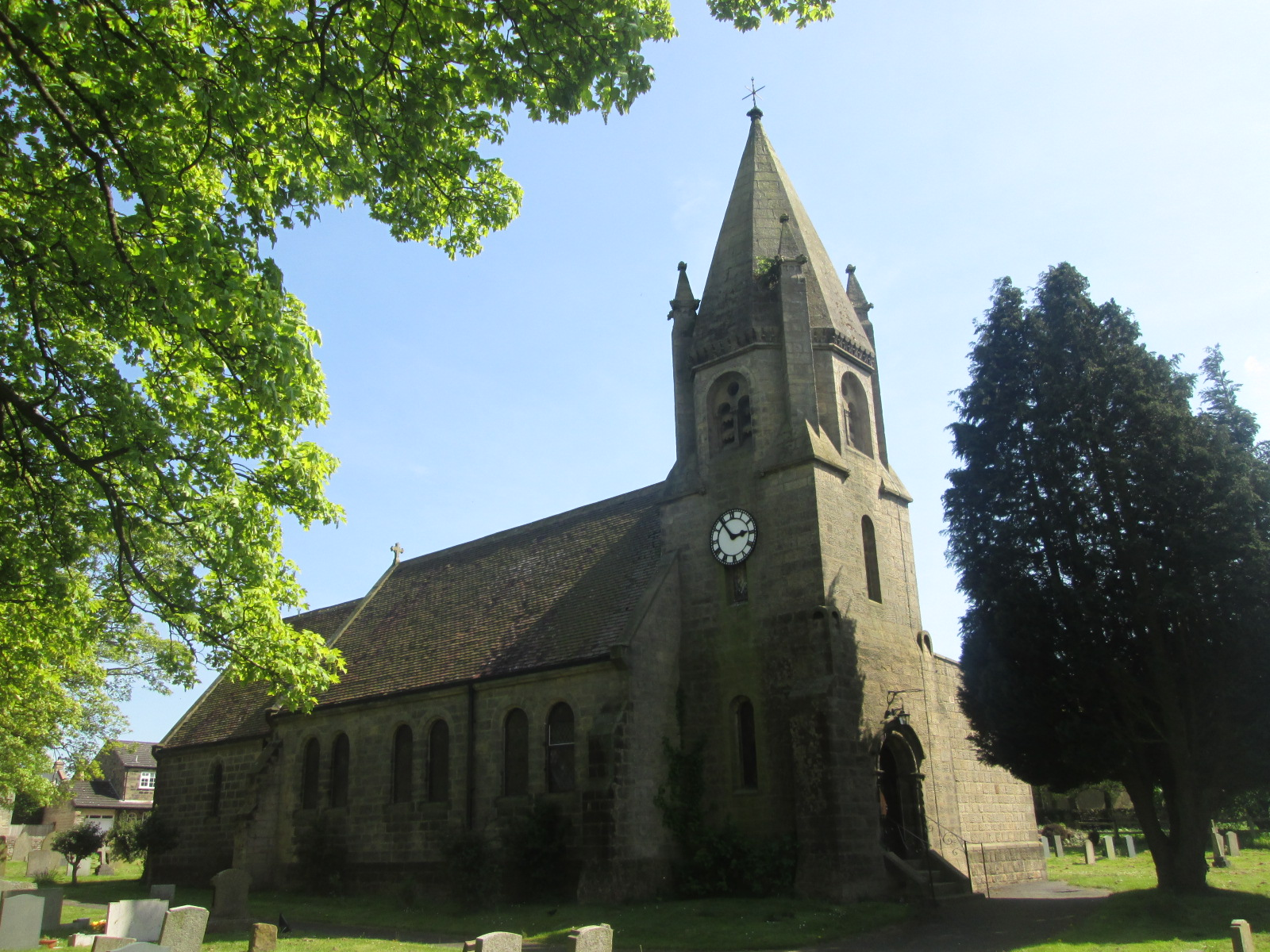
The church, in 2014

St Andrew's Church is an Anglican church in Burnt Yates, a village in North Yorkshire, in England.

Burnt Yates was historically in the parish of All Saints' Church, Ripley. In about 1840, Burnt Yates School was consecrated for worship, and by 1851, it was attracting about 50 worshippers each week. A purpose-built chapel of ease was designed by George Mallinson, and completed in 1883. In 1895, a south aisle was added, to a design by Charles Hodgson Fowler.

The church is in the Norman revival style. It has a west tower with an octagonal belfry and a short spire.
