= St John's Church, Bishop Thornton =

Church in North Yorkshire, England

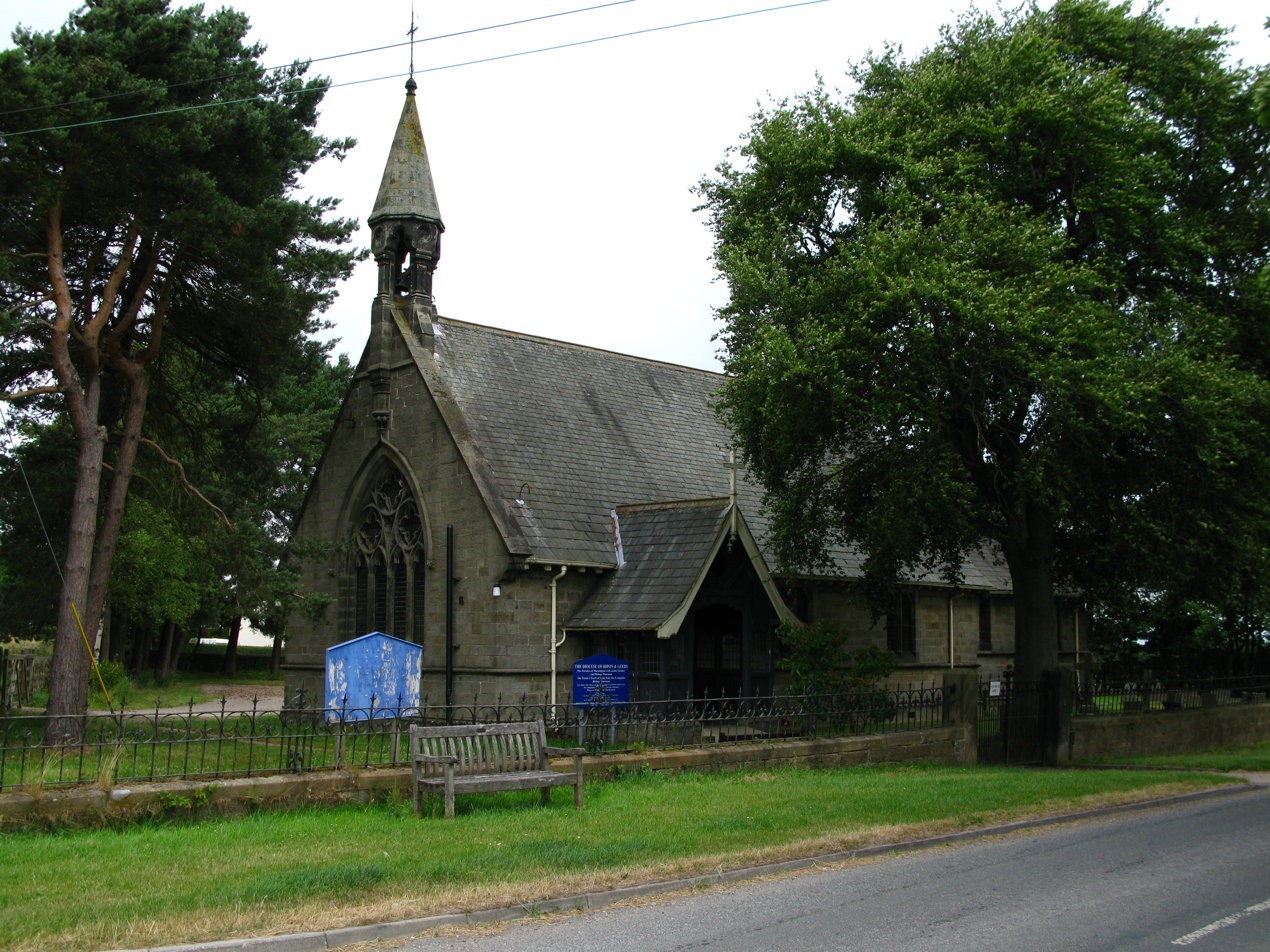
The church, in 2010

St John's Church is an Anglican church in Bishop Thornton, a village in North Yorkshire, in England.

The first church building in Bishop Thornton was constructed in about 1460, on the initiative of John Walworth. It was rebuilt in 1825 by John Oates but was demolished other than the tower in 1888. The three-stage tower (54°04′25″N 1°36′07″W) survives and is a Grade II listed building.

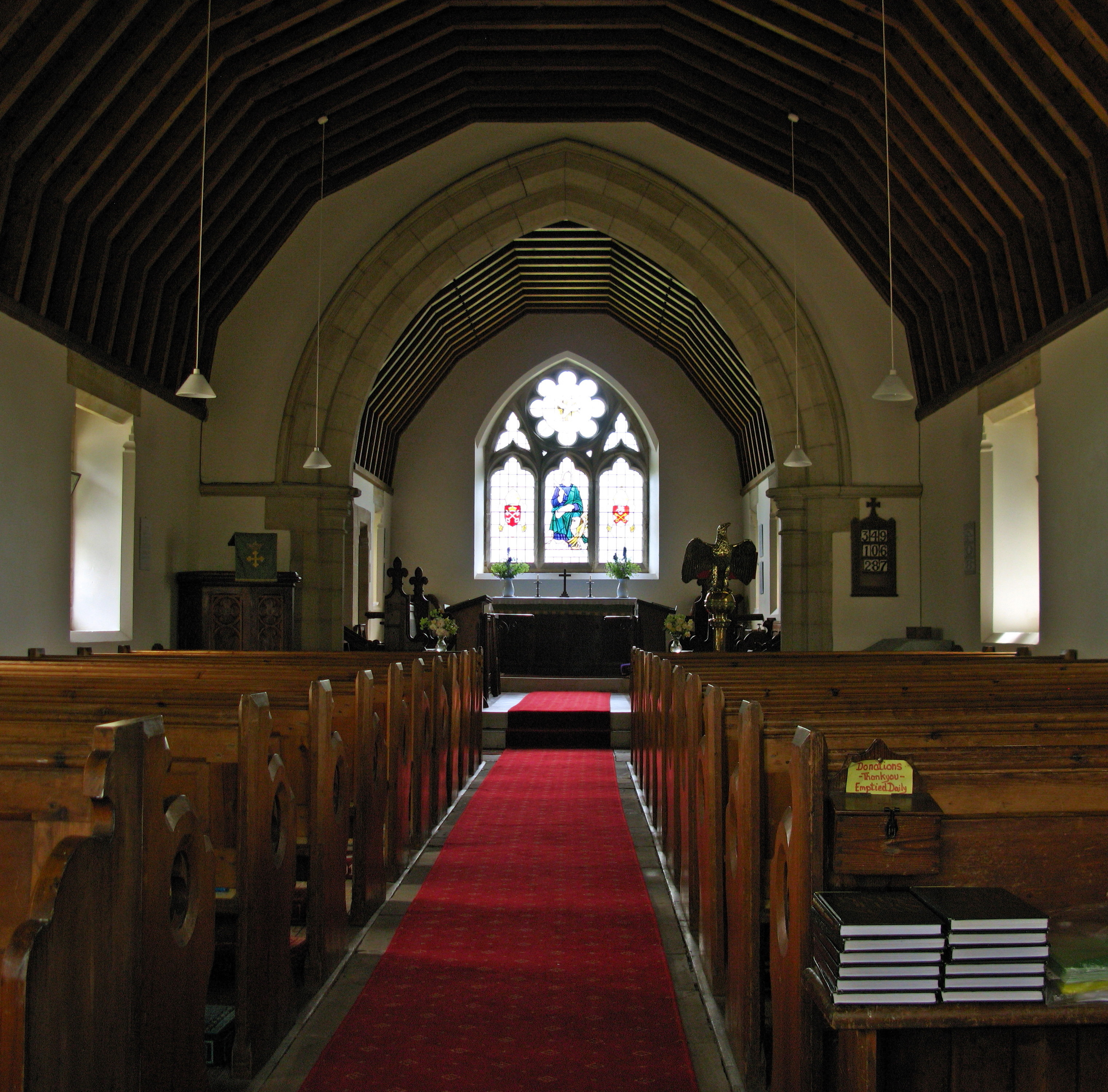
View from the nave into the chancel

The current church was consecrated in January 1889. It lies half a mile south of the old building. The small church is in the Decorated Gothic style, and it has an octagonal bellcote. The chancel has four small windows, which were relocated from the old church. There is an octagonal font, and an organ built by James Jepson Binns. The east window contains a depiction of the old church.

== See also ==
- Listed buildings in Bishop Thornton, Shaw Mills and Warsill
