= Yorke's Folly =

Building in Bewerley, North Yorkshire, England

Coordinates: 54.0675°N 1.7591°W

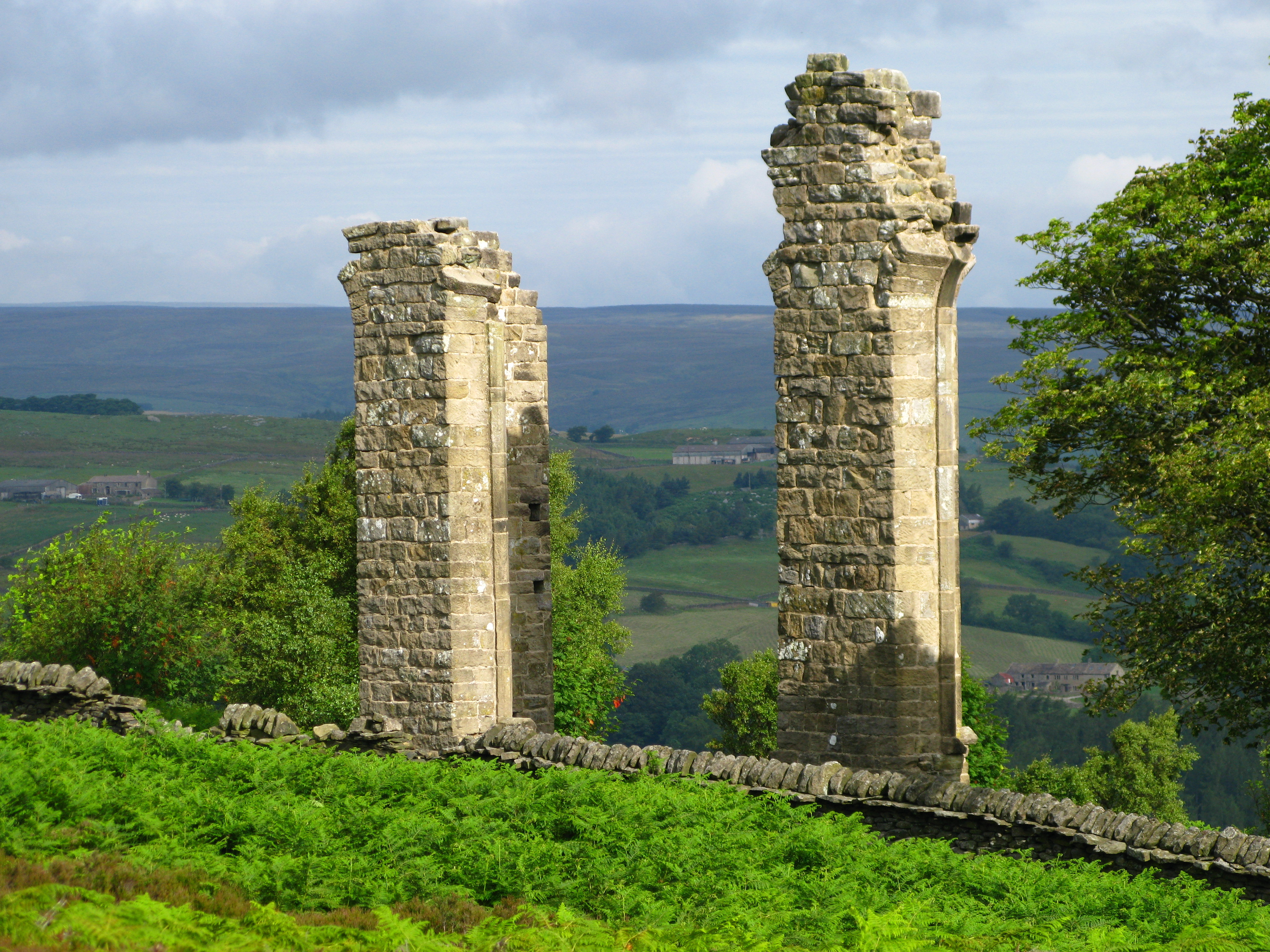
The structure, in 2011

Yorke's Folly is a historic folly in Bewerley, a village in North Yorkshire, in England.

The structure, more commonly known locally as Two Stoops, was erected in about 1820, for John Yorke, as part of the landscaping around the new Bewerley Hall. It is locally believed to have been built in part to relieve unemployment in the district. It was designed to look like the ruins of part of a church, perhaps an east window, or a crossing. Originally it consisted of three columns, and was known as Three Stoops, but one was blown down in 1893. The structure was Grade II listed in 1987.

The columns are built of gritstone, and each is about 15 metres (49 ft) high. They have an L-shaped plan, clearly demarcated quoins, and the suggestion of ruined arches.

== See also ==
- Listed buildings in Bewerley
