= Clint, North Yorkshire =

Village in North Yorkshire, England

Coordinates: 54.03°N 1.61°W

Clint
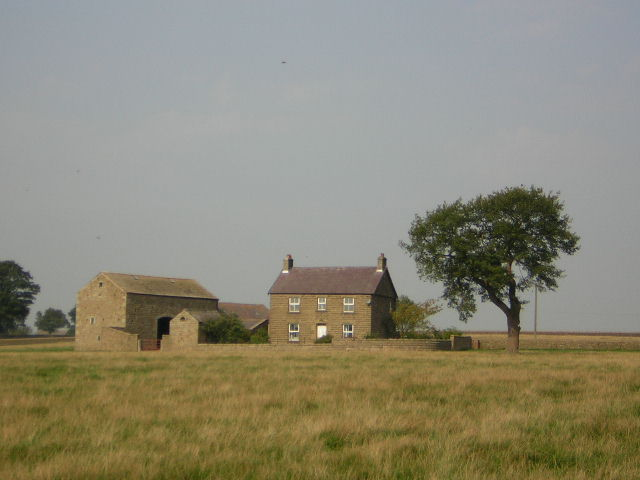
- One of the farms at Clint

- Location within North Yorkshire
- Population: 488 (2011)
- OS grid reference: SE261598
- Civil parish: Clint cum Hamlets
- Unitary authority: North Yorkshire
- Ceremonial county: North Yorkshire
- Region: Yorkshire and the Humber
- Country: England
- Sovereign state: United Kingdom
- Post town: HARROGATE
- Postcode district: HG3
- Police: North Yorkshire
- Fire: North Yorkshire
- Ambulance: Yorkshire

Clint is a village in Nidderdale in North Yorkshire, England. It lies on the north bank of the River Nidd, 4 miles north-west of Harrogate. Clint is the largest village in the civil parish of Clint cum Hamlets, which also includes the settlements of Burnt Yates and Bedlam.

The toponym represents the Old Danish klint, meaning "steep or rocky bank".

== See also ==
- Listed buildings in Clint cum Hamlets
