= Bradley McStravick =

British decathlete (1956–2024)

Personal information
- Born: 25 May 1956 Plymouth, England
- Died: 21 August 2024 (aged 68) Burnt Yates, England
- Height: 184 cm (6 ft 0 in)
- Weight: 80 kg (176 lb)

Sport
- Sport: Athletics
- Event: Decathlon
- Club: Sheffield AC

Bradley Steven McStravick (25 May 1956 – 21 August 2024) was a British athlete. He competed in the men's decathlon at the 1980 Summer Olympics and the 1984 Summer Olympics.

McStravick represented Scotland at the 1982 and 1986 Commonwealth Games. During the 1986 Games in Edinburgh he finished just outside the medals in fourth place behind Daley Thompson.

He was twice the British decathlon champion after winning the British AAA Championships title at the 1979 AAA Championships and the 1980 AAA Championships.

On 21 August 2024, McStravick was killed by a van driver while cycling in Burnt Yates, north of Harrogate (Yorkshire), close to his home. He was 68.

On 11 September 2026, William Langley, of Pateley Bridge, was sentenced at York Magistrates Court for causing the death of McStravick. He was given a 26-week suspended jail sentence after pleading guilty to causing death by careless driving.

1. "Bradley Steven McStravick personal appointments". Companies House.
2. Evans, Hilary; Gjerde, Arild; Heijmans, Jeroen; Mallon, Bill; et al. "Bradley McStravick Olympic Results". Olympics at Sports-Reference.com. Sports Reference LLC. Archived from the original on 17 April 2020.
3. "AAA, WAAA and National Championships Medallists". National Union of Track Statisticians.
4. "AAA Championships (men)". GBR Athletics.
5. "R.I.P Brad McStravick". Scottish Athletes on Facebook. 31 August 2024.
6. YorkMix (21 August 2024). "Cyclist dies after crash with van near North Yorkshire village". YorkMix.
7. "Driver sentenced for causing death of ex-Olympic athlete in Burnt Yates". thestrayferret.co.uk.
8. "Van driver caused death of British Olympian hours after athlete got cancer all-clear". York Press. 11 September 2026.
