= Mickley, North Yorkshire =

Village in North Yorkshire, England

Coordinates: 54°11′17″N 1°36′33″W

Mickley
- Village
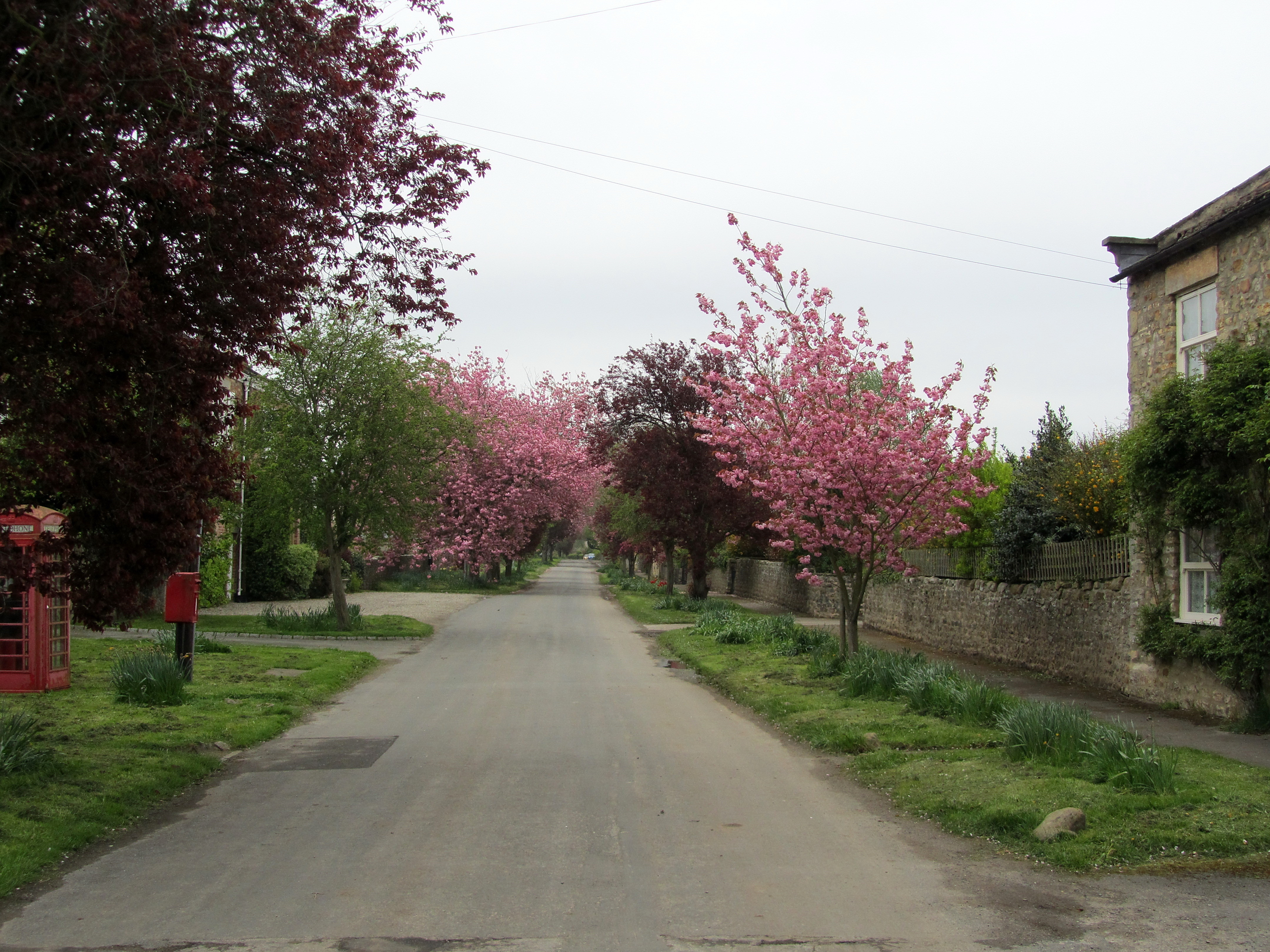
- The Main Street in Mickley

- Location within North Yorkshire
- OS grid reference: SE257769
- Civil parish: Azerley
- Unitary authority: North Yorkshire
- Ceremonial county: North Yorkshire
- Region: Yorkshire and the Humber
- Country: England
- Sovereign state: United Kingdom
- Post town: RIPON
- Postcode district: HG4
- Police: North Yorkshire
- Fire: North Yorkshire
- Ambulance: Yorkshire
- UK Parliament: Skipton and Ripon Constituency

Mickley is a village in the county of North Yorkshire, England. The village is on the south bank of the River Ure between Masham and West Tanfield.

== History ==
Whilst Mickley is not mentioned in the Domesday Book (although neighbouring Azerley is), the village name is recorded as far back as the 12th century as Michelhach, a combination of Michel and Haga, meaning Great Enclosure. The village was historically in the township of Azerley in the ecclesiastical parish of Kirkby Malzeard, in the wapentake of Claro, in the West Riding of Yorkshire. In the boundary changes of 1974, it was transferred to the new county of North Yorkshire, 5 miles (8 km) south of Masham and 6 miles (9.7 km) north-west of Ripon. From 1974 to 2023 it was part of the Borough of Harrogate, it is now administered by the unitary North Yorkshire Council.

The village is now in the civil parish of Azerley, and in the Skipton and Ripon Constituency.

A Wesleyan chapel was built in the village in 1815, followed in 1841, by the Church of St John the Evangelist, an Anglican place of worship. The church is still a place of worship and is a grade II listed building in the Early English style. The Methodist chapel, itself grade II listed, is now a private residence. A large mill was in the village with its own mill-race. The mill processed linen and flax, and was operating by 1841, when a court case arose between the mill-owner and a seller of flax in London, who shipped the flax to Ripon by boat, and thence taken to Boroughbridge by cart. Unfortunately the flax-owner went bankrupt, and the flax was seized before it could be delivered.

== Environment ==
The village is on the Ripon Rowel long-distance path, which forms a circular 50-mile (80 km) walk which starts and ends in Ripon. The section through Mickley follows the River Ure through Mickley Barras Wood, which is to the west of the village. The wood is designated as a site of important nature conservation (a wet wood).

== See also ==
- Listed buildings in Azerley
