= Foster Beck Mill =

Building in North Yorkshire, England

Coordinates: 54°05′36″N 1°46′33″W

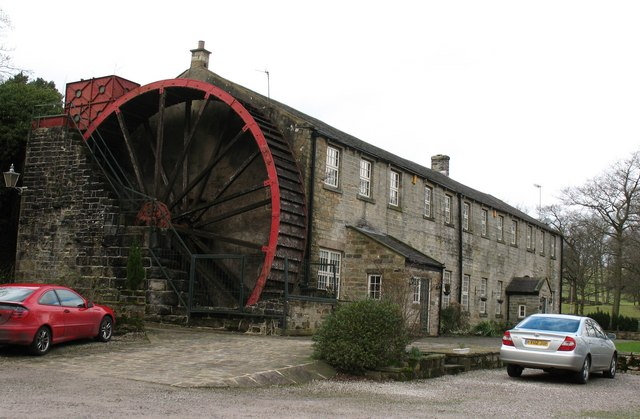
The building, in 2008

Foster Beck Mill is a former watermill about 1 mile north-west of Pateley Bridge, a town in North Yorkshire, in England. It lies on the southern bank of Foster Beck, a tributary of the River Nidd, within the civil parish of Bewerley.

The mill was built in 1864, to process hemp into twine. It was later used for manufacturing linen, which ceased in the 1966. The building was then converted into a pub, the Watermill Inn. In 2003, the pub closed. The building was converted into two houses and five holiday lets, while neighbouring Fosterbeck Cottage was converted into a replacement pub, named the Bridge Inn.

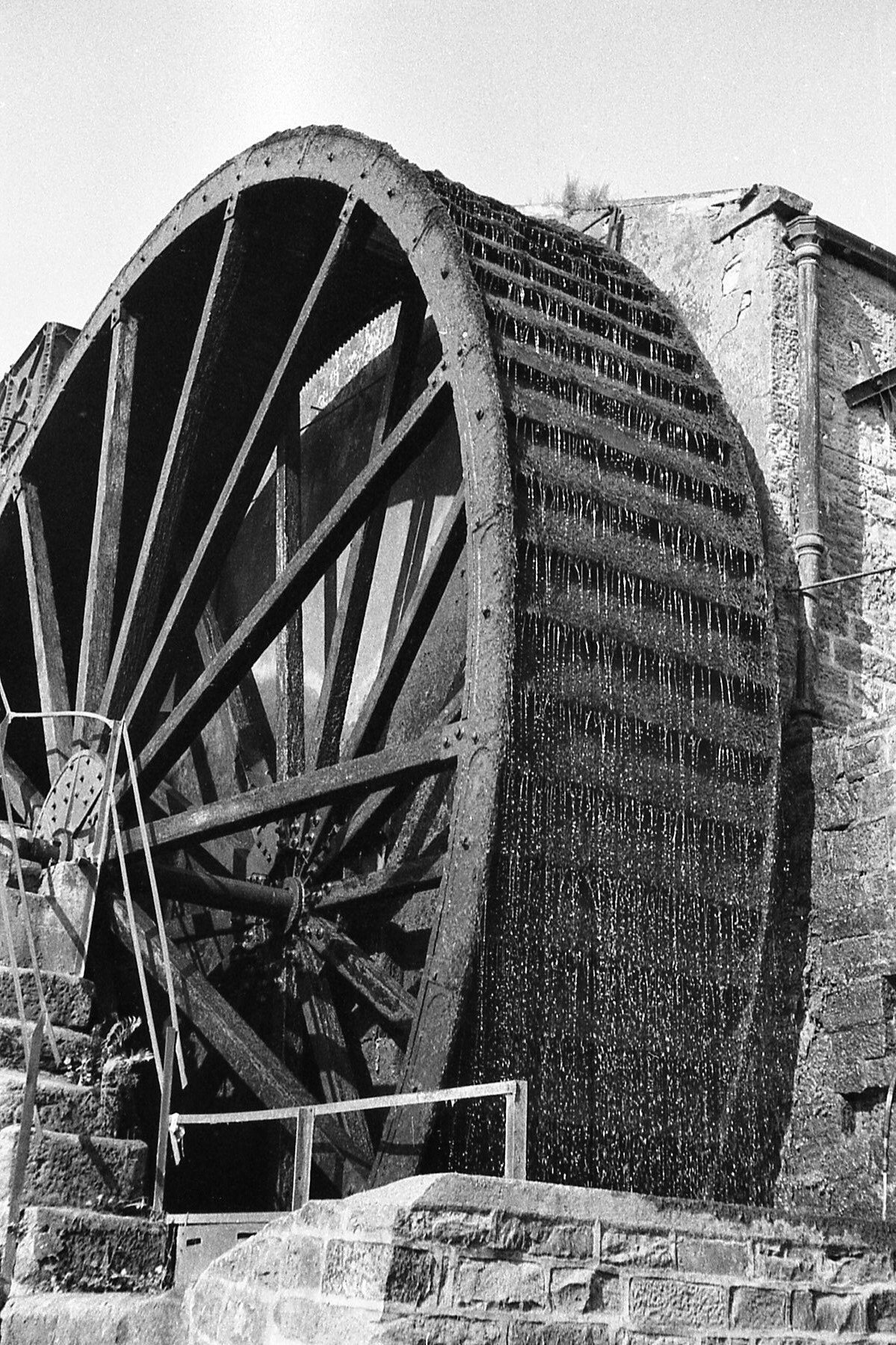
The waterwheel in use, in 1962

The two-storey building has been Grade II listed since 1974. It is built of gritstone, and has a slate roof. It is 12 bays wide, with the ninth bay containing a carriage arch. Its most notable feature is the 30 horsepower high-breast shot waterwheel, which is 35 feet high and 5 feet wide. It was installed in 1904, but later in the century, the mill was converted to run on diesel.

== See also ==
- Listed buildings in Bewerley
