= Winksley =

Village and civil parish in North Yorkshire, England

Coordinates: 54.136°N 1.616°W

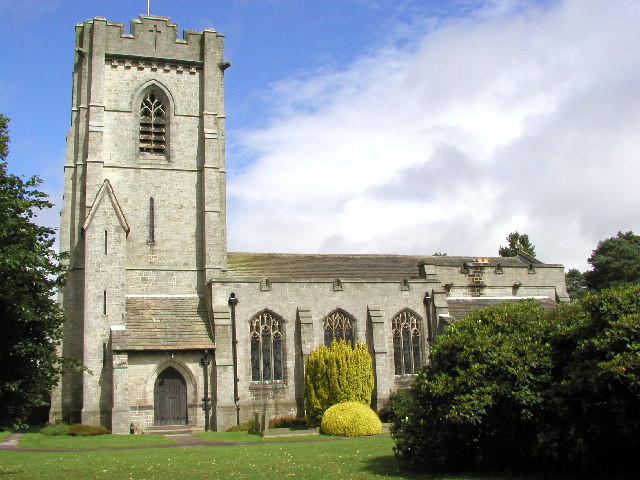
- St Cuthbert and St Oswald's Church, Winksley

- Location within North Yorkshire
- Area: 1.14 sq mi (3.0 km^{2})
- Population: 142 (2011)
  - Density: 125/sq mi (48/km^{2})
- OS grid reference: SE252713
  - London: 193 mi (311 km) SSW
- Unitary authority: North Yorkshire
- Ceremonial county: North Yorkshire
- Region: Yorkshire and the Humber
- Country: England
- Sovereign state: United Kingdom
- Post town: RIPON
- Postcode district: HG4
- Dialling code: 01765
- Police: North Yorkshire
- Fire: North Yorkshire
- Ambulance: Yorkshire
- UK Parliament: Skipton and Ripon

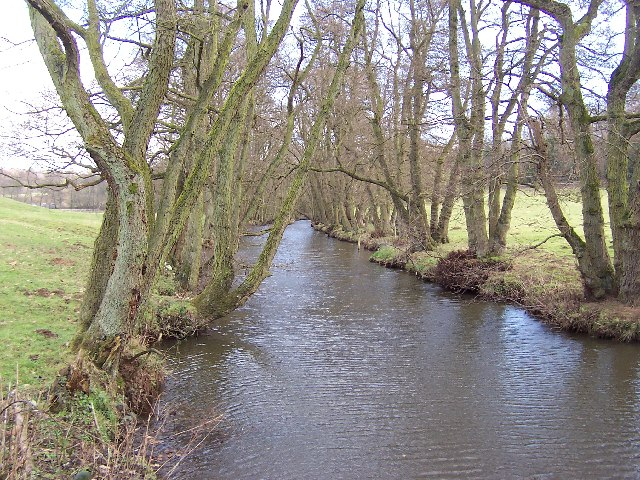
River Skell

Winksley is a small village and civil parish in the county of North Yorkshire, England. It is situated west of Ripon, and is on the River Laver, which flows into the River Skell (a tributary of the River Ure) just outside Ripon. Winksley is surrounded by farmland and is close to several woodlands including Hencliffe wood, Kendale wood, and North wood.

== Demography ==
Winksley Total Population 1811–2011

As Winksley is a small parish in North Yorkshire therefore it has a relatively small population density of 142 people. There are 119 persons over the age of 16, the largest age group is adults aged between 35 and 54 indicating that Winksley is a quiet and more family orientated area. The two next largest age groups are 55–64 with 24 people and 65–74 with 22 people illustrating this is a place where many people like to retire. The population has not changed over the past two centuries, in 1811 the population was 143 persons, showing that Winksley is still at present a rural and relatively isolated area in North Yorkshire. The number of females and males is still unchanged with a slightly higher female population of 74 in both 1811 and 2011, the male population of Winksley has decreased by one from 69 in 1811 to 68 males in 2011. Even though the population in the early 1800s and the current population are extremely similar, during the mid 19th century there was a significant increase in Winksley's population. According to the historical population reports of England, in 1821 the population increased to 176 persons and by 1831 the population rocketed to 259 persons, in total Winksley's population increased by 116 people over 20 years. 1831 was the beginning of the Industrial Revolution; in the towns and cities that surrounded Winksley there would have been an increase in work for young men. But there was still agricultural work in Winksley although the number of people working in agriculture decreased from 18 in 1811 to 10 in 1831.

There are a total of 59 households in Winksley. The majority of households are one family only, twelve households are families with children, another twelve households are married couples with no children. There are nineteen households with residents over the age of 65. There are 28 households that have only 2 residents, the next majority is one person households at 11 dwellings in Winksley and there is only one house with 6 persons. Therefore, showing Winksley is more a retirement area than a family one.

According to 2011 census data, 48 households are detached houses or bungalows, illustrating that Winksley is a reasonably wealthy area. Winksley house prices vary with houses, but houses tend to start at approximately £140,000, nearby Ripon gives a better indication of house types and prices with some priced at approximately £180,000 and other at £900,000.

== Governance ==
Winksley shares a grouped parish council with the civil parish of Azerley. The parish was historically in the West Riding of Yorkshire, but in 1974 was transferred to the new county of North Yorkshire. From 1974 to 2023 it was part of the Borough of Harrogate. It is now administered by the unitary North Yorkshire Council.

Winksley is within the Nidderdale National Landscape.

== Landmarks ==
Even though Winksley is a small village it still attracts tourists, the Woodhouse farm is located in Winksley. It is a touring caravan, camping, and holiday home park. Winksley sits between the Yorkshire Dales and the North Yorkshire Moors, so is perfect for fishing and country walks. The Woodhouse farm is a relatively popular campsite, particularly in the summer months; it has many facilities on site including a restaurant, a shop, a young children's play area and a newly established cycle track for mountain biking. The location of Woodhouse farm provides easy access to other tourist sites such as Ripon Cathedral, Brimham Rocks, Fountains Abbey, Lightwater Valley, Malham, and Studley Royal.

== Transport ==
Winksley, even though a small village has six bus routes. The six bus routes include:

- Route number 139, Ripon service
- Route number 641H, school service (Fares and permits)
- Route number 703H, school service (Permits only)
- Route number 707H, school service (Permits only)
- Route number 708H, school service (Permits only)
- Route number 739H, school service (Fares and permits).

The bus services 139, 641H and 739H also run via many other villages and towns; including Ripon, Grantley, Sawley, Fountains Abbey, and Markington.

Winksley does not have a railway station, but the nearest railway stations are Harrogate railway station which is 10.46 miles away and Starbeck which is 10.64 miles away.

Winksley is partially encircled by the B6265, which connects Winksley to the cathedral city of Ripon, 4.5 miles away from Winksley. The B6265, also connects Winksley to the spa town of Harrogate.

== See also ==
- Listed buildings in Winksley
