= Bedlam, North Yorkshire =

Village in North Yorkshire, England

Coordinates: 54.04978°N 1.59262°W

Bedlam
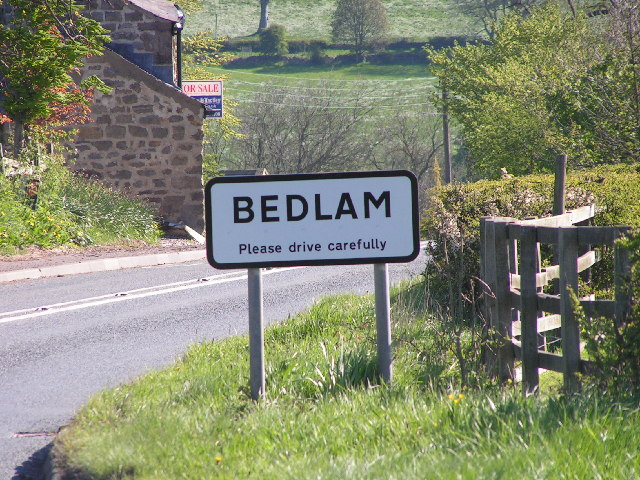
- Approach to Bedlam

- Location within North Yorkshire
- OS grid reference: SE267616
- Civil parish: Clint cum Hamlets
- Unitary authority: North Yorkshire
- Ceremonial county: North Yorkshire
- Region: Yorkshire and the Humber
- Country: England
- Sovereign state: United Kingdom
- Post town: HARROGATE
- Postcode district: HG3
- Police: North Yorkshire
- Fire: North Yorkshire
- Ambulance: Yorkshire

Bedlam is a small village in the county of North Yorkshire, England situated north of Harrogate.

Until 1974 it was part of the West Riding of Yorkshire. From 1974 to 2023 it was part of the Borough of Harrogate, it is now administered by the unitary North Yorkshire Council.

Its name most likely came from Old English (æt) Botlum = "at the buildings" (with a dative plural case ending), or its Old Norse equivalent, and not the same origin as Bedlam insane asylum. There is also a Bedlam, Shropshire.

== See also ==
- Listed buildings in Clint cum Hamlets
