= Calcutt, North Yorkshire =

Village in North Yorkshire, England

Coordinates: 53.999°N 1.468°W

Calcutt
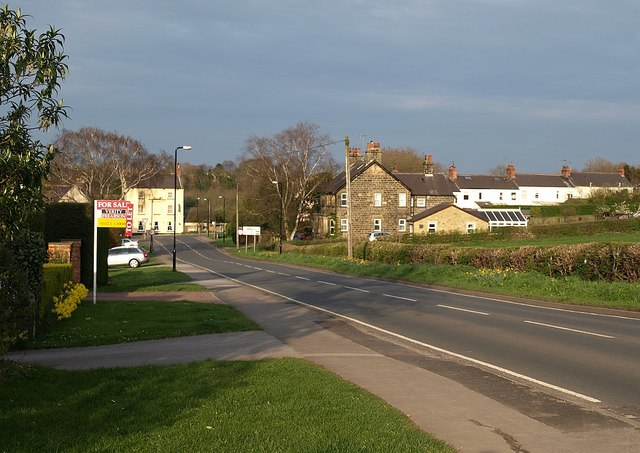
- Entering Calcutt on road C274

- Location within North Yorkshire
- OS grid reference: SE343557
  - London: 180 mi (290 km) SSE
- Civil parish: Knaresborough
- Unitary authority: North Yorkshire
- Ceremonial county: North Yorkshire
- Region: Yorkshire and the Humber
- Country: England
- Sovereign state: United Kingdom
- Post town: KNARESBOROUGH
- Postcode district: HG5
- Police: North Yorkshire
- Fire: North Yorkshire
- Ambulance: Yorkshire

Calcutt is a village in the county of North Yorkshire, England.

Until 1974 it was part of the West Riding of Yorkshire. From 1974 to 2023 it was part of the Borough of Harrogate, it is now administered by the unitary North Yorkshire Council.
