= Galphay =

Village in North Yorkshire, England

Coordinates: 54.149°N 1.616°W

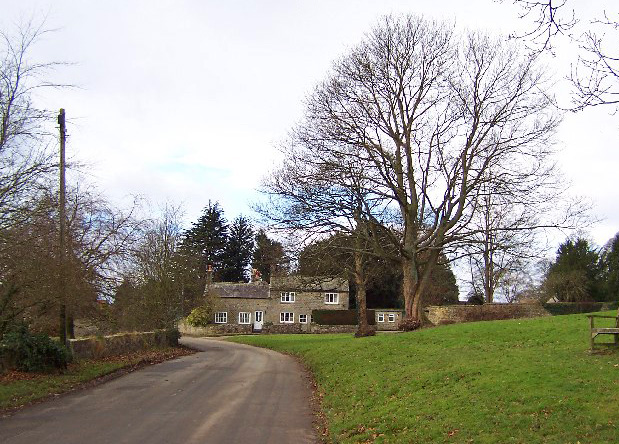
- Galphay looking west, showing part of the village green.

- Location within North Yorkshire
- OS grid reference: SE2507872662
- Civil parish: Azerley
- Unitary authority: North Yorkshire
- Ceremonial county: North Yorkshire
- Region: Yorkshire and the Humber
- Country: England
- Sovereign state: United Kingdom
- Post town: RIPON
- Postcode district: HG4
- Police: North Yorkshire
- Fire: North Yorkshire
- Ambulance: Yorkshire

Galphay (traditionally pronounced [ˈgɔ:fə] GAW-fə) is a village in North Yorkshire, England. It is situated in the Nidderdale Area of Outstanding Natural Beauty (AONB).

It is a lower dales village, some 4 miles (6.4 km) west of Ripon and close to the larger village of Kirkby Malzeard. A large central green is used for village events and has a flagstaff, village seat and a number of trees. The pub, The Galphay Inn is open Tuesdays to Sundays. The village has no church, shops or other public buildings and the Red Phone Box is also under threat of closure.

The name is derived from the Old English galga 'gallows' and haga 'enclosure', and thus means 'gallows enclosure'. The earliest documentation about Galphay records that it was owned by Fountains Abbey in 1189.

Galphay now has around 60 houses, with a population of about 200. In the last 100 years, a village school was opened; and subsequently closed. The same fate awaited the Methodist Chapel, which is now a private house. A 'Village Institute', which was established after the First World War, is still in existence; housed in wooden structure originally used to house troops in training camp.

Galphay was historically a hamlet in the township of Azerley in the large ancient parish of Kirkby Malzeard in the West Riding of Yorkshire. It became part of the civil parish of Azerley in 1866, and has now grown larger than the village of Azerley. In 1974 it was transferred to the new county of North Yorkshire. From 1974 to 2023 it was part of the Borough of Harrogate, it is now administered by the unitary North Yorkshire Council.

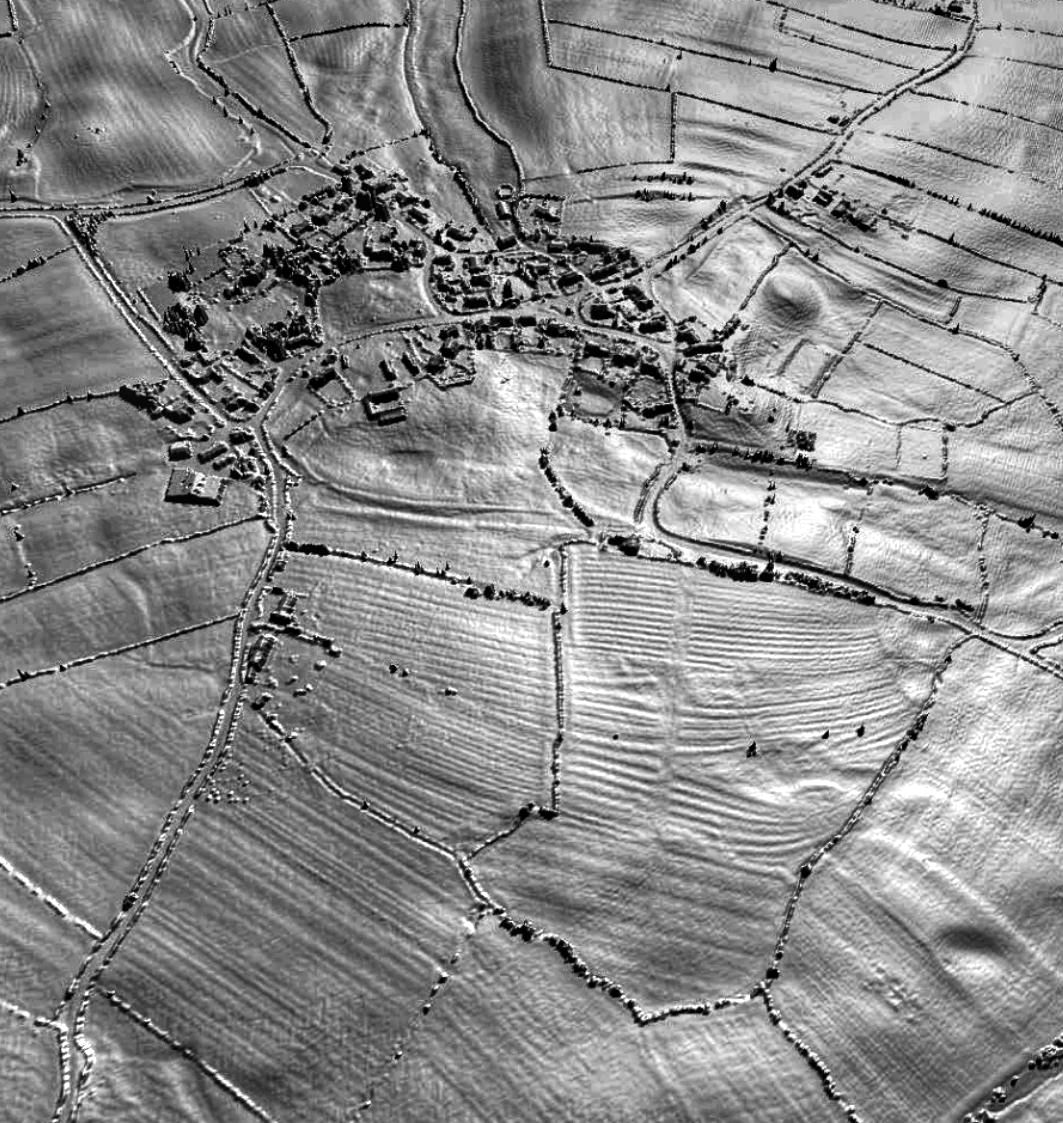
A lidar view of Galphay.

== See also ==
- Listed buildings in Azerley
