= St Cuthbert and St Oswald's Church, Winksley =

Church in North Yorkshire, England

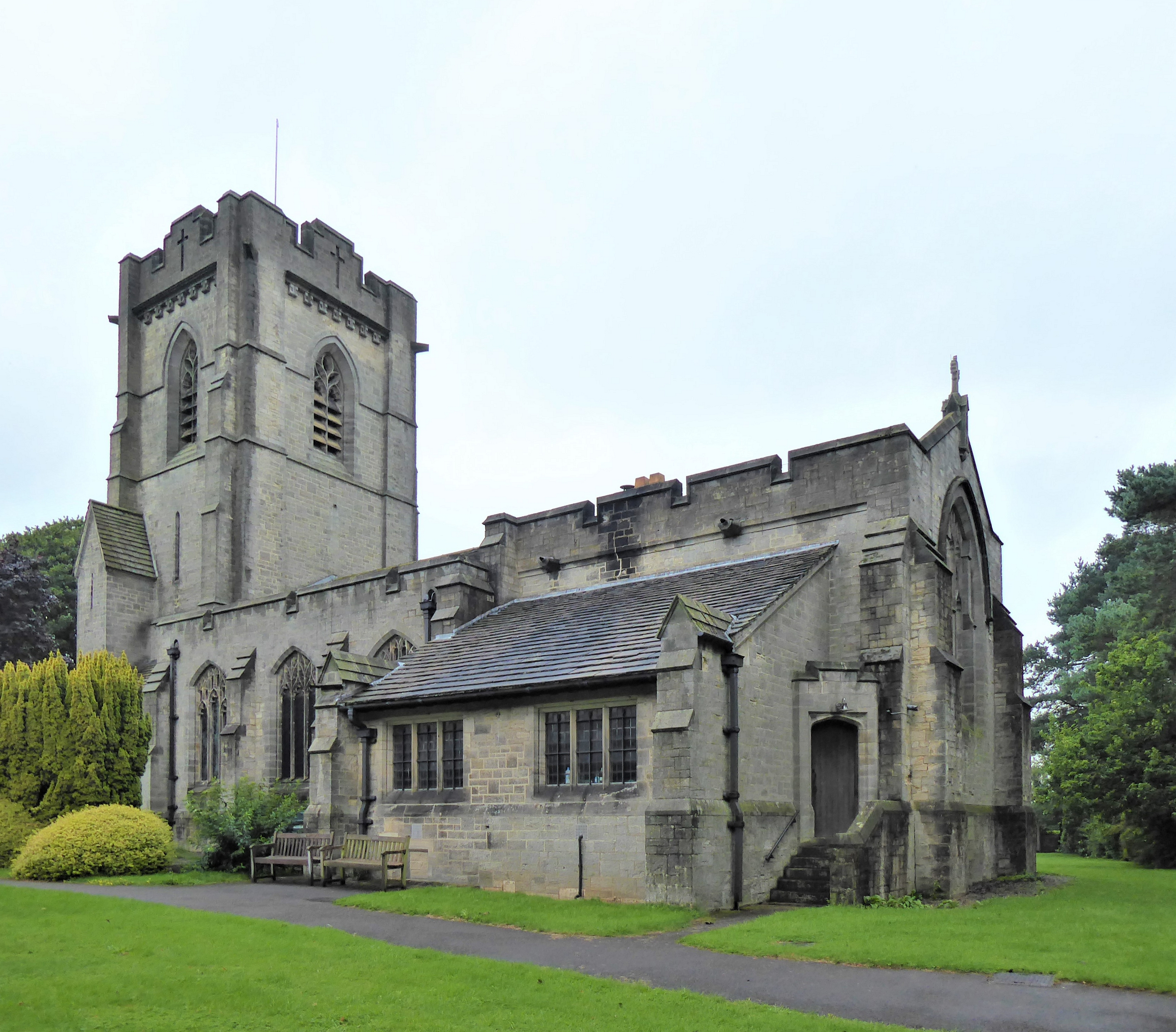
The church, in 2019

St Cuthbert and St Oswald's Church is the parish church of Winksley, a village in North Yorkshire, in England.

A church was built in Winksley in about 1500, on behalf of Marmaduke Huby; it is possible that this was a reconstruction of an earlier building. The church was restored in the 18th century. In 1848, it was described as "small ancient structure with a tower, [which] has been enlarged". In 1912, the church was demolished and a new building constructed to the southeast, to a design by Connon and Chorley. It was grade II listed in 1986.

The church is built of gritstone with a stone slate roof, and is in Perpendicular style. It consists of a nave with narrow north and south aisles incorporated into it, a chancel with a south vestry and a north organ chamber, and a west tower. The tower has three stages, with north and south porches, a south stair turret, buttresses, bands, and an irregular indented parapet. There are similar parapets on the body of the church. Inside, there are marble columns supporting a wooden ceiling under the tower, and the font, pulpit and screen are all in white marble. At the west end are memorials to the Furness family of Grantley Hall.

== See also ==
- Listed buildings in Winksley
