= St John's Church, Mickley =

Church in North Yorkshire, England

Coordinates: 54°11′17″N 1°36′42″W

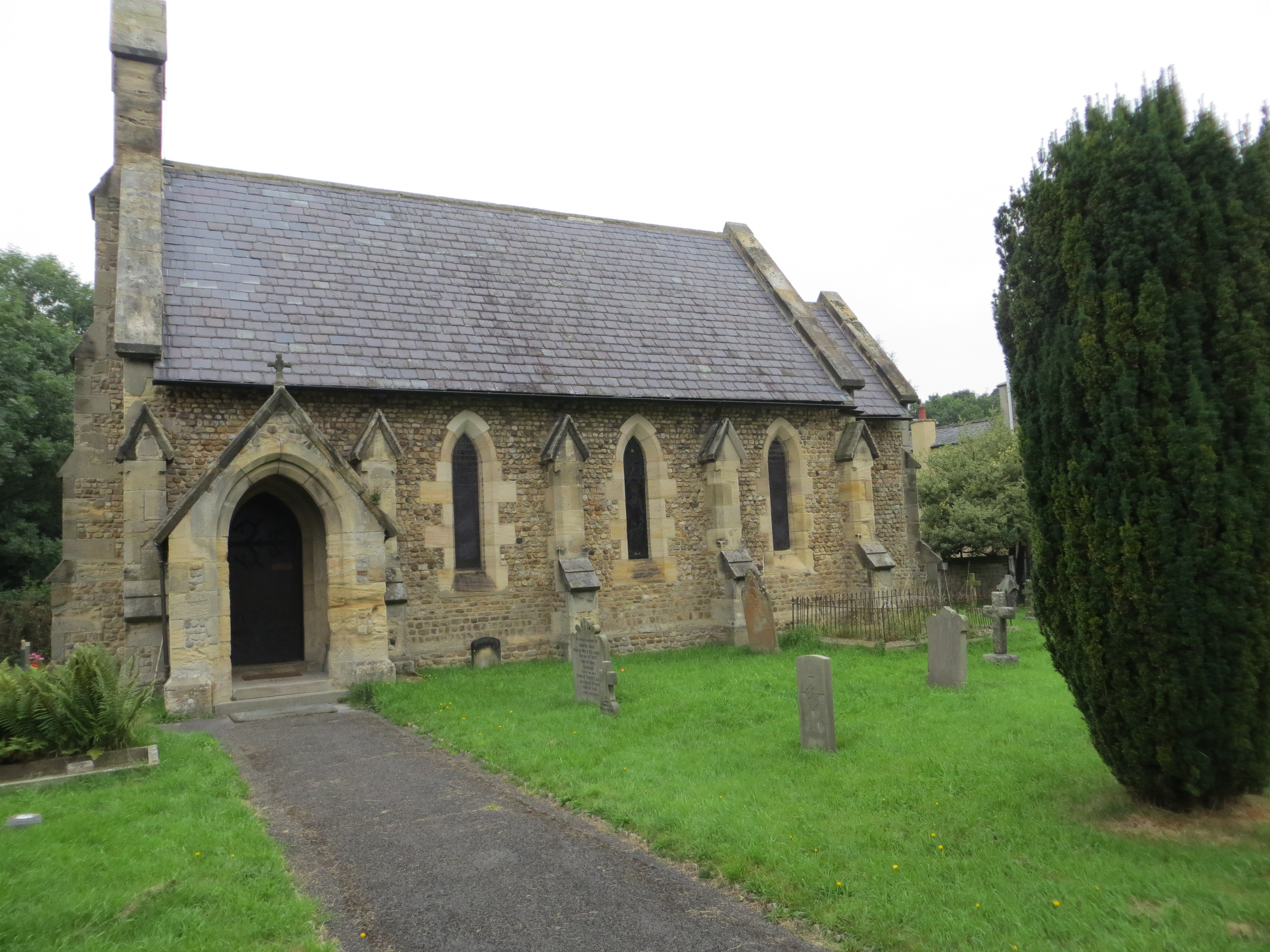
The church, in 2013

St John's Church, Mickley is the parish church of the village of Mickley, North Yorkshire, in England.

The church was built in 1841, funded by the family of Colonel Dalton, of Sleningford Park. It is in the Early English style, and was Grade II listed in 1986.

The church is built in split cobbles, with stone dressings and a purple slate roof. It consists of a four-bay nave, a south porch, and a single-bay chancel, with a bellcote on the west gable. The porch is gabled and has an arched entrance with a chamfered surround. The inner door is noted for its elaborate hinges. The windows on the sides are lancets alternating with stepped buttresses, at the east end are three lancets. Inside, there are boards displaying the Ten Commandments, 20th-century furnishings, and a timber roof.

== See also ==
- Listed buildings in Azerley
