= Burnt Yates School =

Primary school in Burnt Yates, England

Coordinates: 54.0466°N 1.6179°W

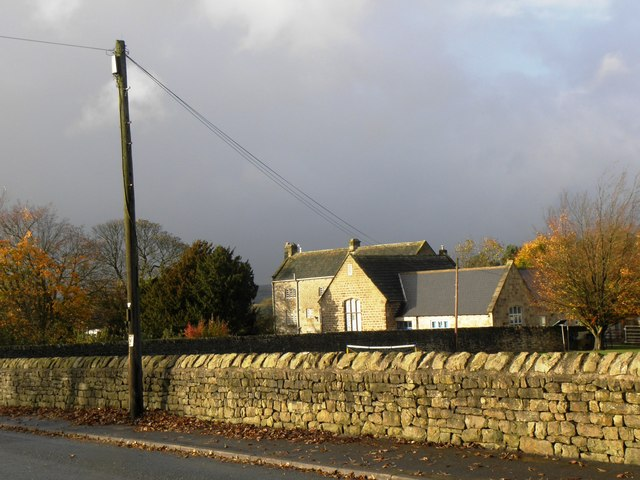
The building, in 2009

Burnt Yates School was a primary school in the village of Burnt Yates, in North Yorkshire, in England.

The school was founded in 1760. It was endowed with £150 in the will of William Coates, a shopkeeper in nearby Ripley, who had heard negative reports of the behaviour of children in Burnt Yates. It was also endowed with the estate of Flask Farm, by Rear Admiral Robert Long. It became a state school in the 20th century, and in its first 250 years had just 15 headteachers.

The school was rated inadequate by Ofsted, due to its safeguarding procedures. It then failed to find an academy chain to join, leading it to close in 2018. The following year, Admiral Long School moved from nearby Bishop Thornton to the Burnt Yates building.

The school building dates from 1760, and was extended in 1763 and 1849. A trustees' room was added in 1773. It is built of gritstone, the roof of the earlier parts is in stone slate, with stone coping and a shaped kneeler, and the later part is in blue slate. The original part has two tall storeys and two bays, the 1763 extension to the left is of the same height, with three storeys and two bays, and the latest extension is at right angles to the right and has a single tall storey. In the original part are floor bands and a doorway with a quoined surround, above which is an inscribed crest, and both earlier parts have quoins. The latest part has a porch, a date plaque, and a bellcote. In all parts are windows that are mullioned, or mullioned and transomed. The trustees' room includes original chairs made by Thomas Chippendale, a Georgian map, and portraits of George I of Great Britain and Caroline of Ansbach. The building was Grade II listed in 1987.

== See also ==
- Listed buildings in Clint cum Hamlets
