= Azerley =

Village and civil parish in North Yorkshire, England

Coordinates: 54.16754°N 1.60288°W

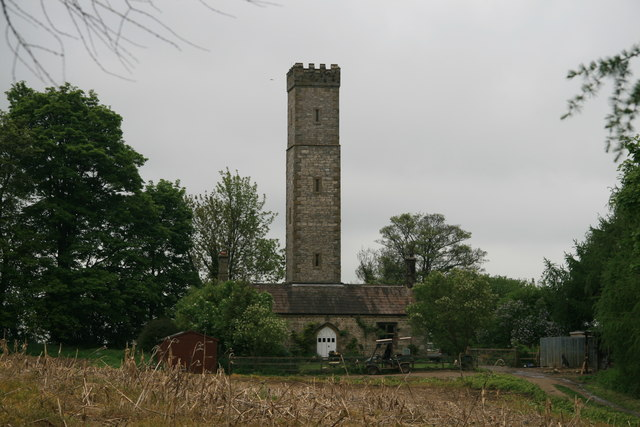
- Azerley Tower

- Location within North Yorkshire
- Population: 340 (2011 census)
- OS grid reference: SE260747
- Civil parish: Azerley
- Unitary authority: North Yorkshire
- Ceremonial county: North Yorkshire
- Region: Yorkshire and the Humber
- Country: England
- Sovereign state: United Kingdom
- Post town: RIPON
- Postcode district: HG4
- Police: North Yorkshire
- Fire: North Yorkshire
- Ambulance: Yorkshire

Azerley is a hamlet and civil parish in the county of North Yorkshire, England. It is about 4 miles (6 km) north-west of Ripon.

The name Azerley derives from the Old Norse personal name Atsurr and the Old English lēah meaning 'wood or clearing'.

The civil parish includes the larger village of Galphay, and also the village of Mickley. The population of the parish in the 2001 census was 355, reducing to 340 at the 2011 Census. The civil parish shares a grouped parish council with the civil parish of Winksley.

Until 1974 it was part of the West Riding of Yorkshire. From 1974 to 2023 it was part of the Borough of Harrogate, it is now administered by the unitary North Yorkshire Council.

Braithwaite Hall, about half a mile north west of Galphay, is a Grade II listed building thought to date from the 16th century. It should not be confused with Braithwaite Hall in Coverdale, a National Trust property.

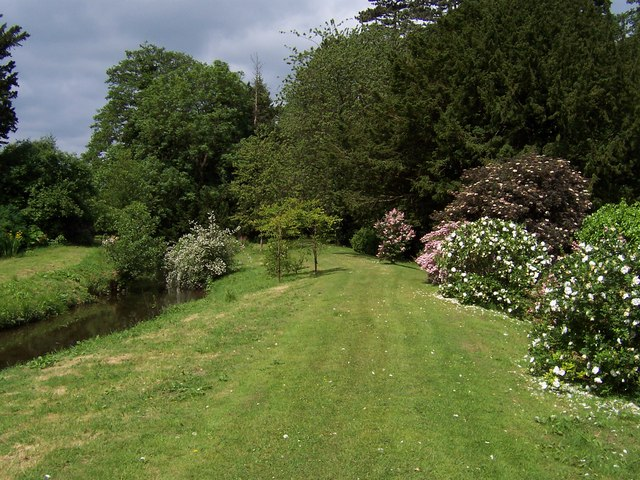
Gardens at Azerley Chase

== See also ==
- Listed buildings in Azerley
