= Marton-le-Moor =

Village and civil parish in North Yorkshire, England

Coordinates: 54°07′48″N 1°26′00″W

- Location within North Yorkshire
- Population: 182 (2011 census)
- OS grid reference: SE370705
- Civil parish: Marton-le-Moor
- Unitary authority: North Yorkshire
- Ceremonial county: North Yorkshire
- Region: Yorkshire and the Humber
- Country: England
- Sovereign state: United Kingdom
- Post town: RIPON
- Postcode district: HG4
- Police: North Yorkshire
- Fire: North Yorkshire
- Ambulance: Yorkshire

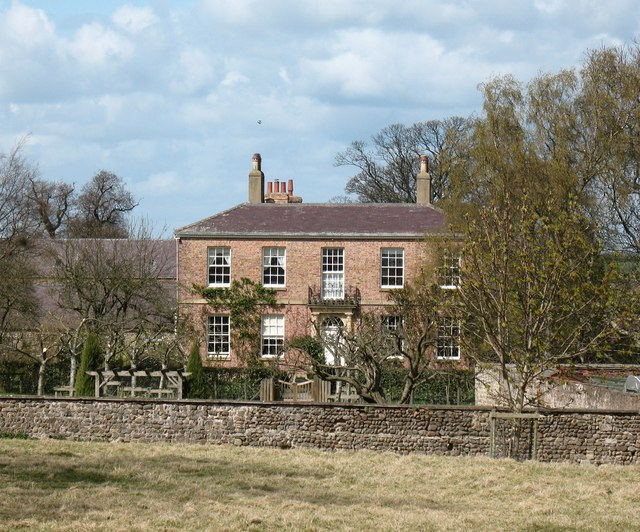
The Manor House, Marton-le-Moor

Marton-le-Moor is a village and civil parish in the county of North Yorkshire, England. It is very near the A1(M) motorway, 4 miles (6.4 km) east of Ripon and 3 miles (4.8 km) west of Boroughbridge. The name of the village derives from a mixture of Latin, Old English and Old Norse; Marr tūn super mōr, which means marsh farm (or settlement) on the moor.

According to the 2001 UK census, Marton-le-Moor parish had a population of 174, increasing to 182 in the 2011 Census. In 2015, North Yorkshire County Council estimated the population of the village to be 190.

Village affairs are conducted by the Parish Council. Social functions are held regularly and organised by the Village Meeting Room committee which converted the Blacksmith shop to be used as a local community hall.

From 1974 to 2023 it was part of the Borough of Harrogate, it is now administered by the unitary North Yorkshire Council.

The grade II listed St Mary's Church, Marton-le-Moor, which was built in 1830, is now no longer in regular use for worship, having been declared redundant in 2004. During 2009, it was offered for sale without any mains electric or water connection, and a promise made by the buyer "not to disturb any human remains in the grounds". The Parish Council is going to turn the unused part of St Mary's churchyard into a community garden to benefit all sectors of the community, especially older people and mothers with toddlers.

== See also ==
- Listed buildings in Marton-le-Moor
