= Bewerley Grange =

Building in Bewerley, North Yorkshire, England

Coordinates: 54°04′42″N 1°45′37″W

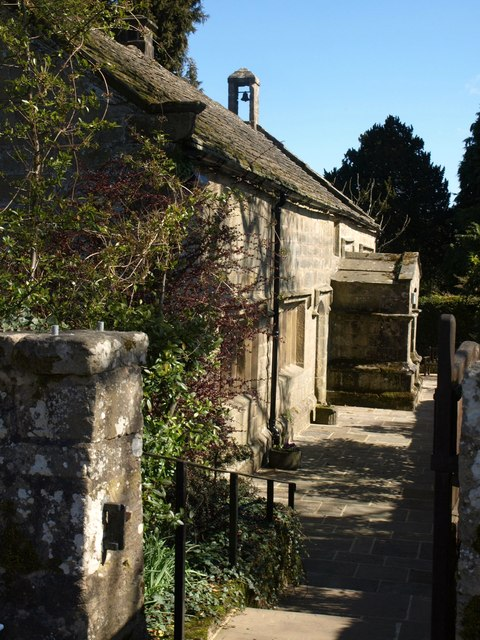
The building, in 2012

Bewerley Grange is a historic building in Bewerley, a village in North Yorkshire, in England.

Fountains Abbey established a monastic grange in Bewerley. In the early 16th century, under the abbotship of Marmaduke Huby, the monks constructed a chapel at the grange. Despite the Dissolution of the Monasteries, the building continued in use. In 1674 Dame Mary Yorke, widow of Sir John Yorke, bought the manor of Bewerley, and in 1678 she gave the chapel to be used as a school. The school was at first maintained by Richard Taylor, another local landowner, but from about 1737 it was maintained mainly by the Yorke family. It was restored in 1831, when the school closed. By the end of the century, the chapel had become a gardener's store, and the schoolhouse had become a private residence. The chapel was restored for worship in 1965, and the building was Grade II* listed in 1967.

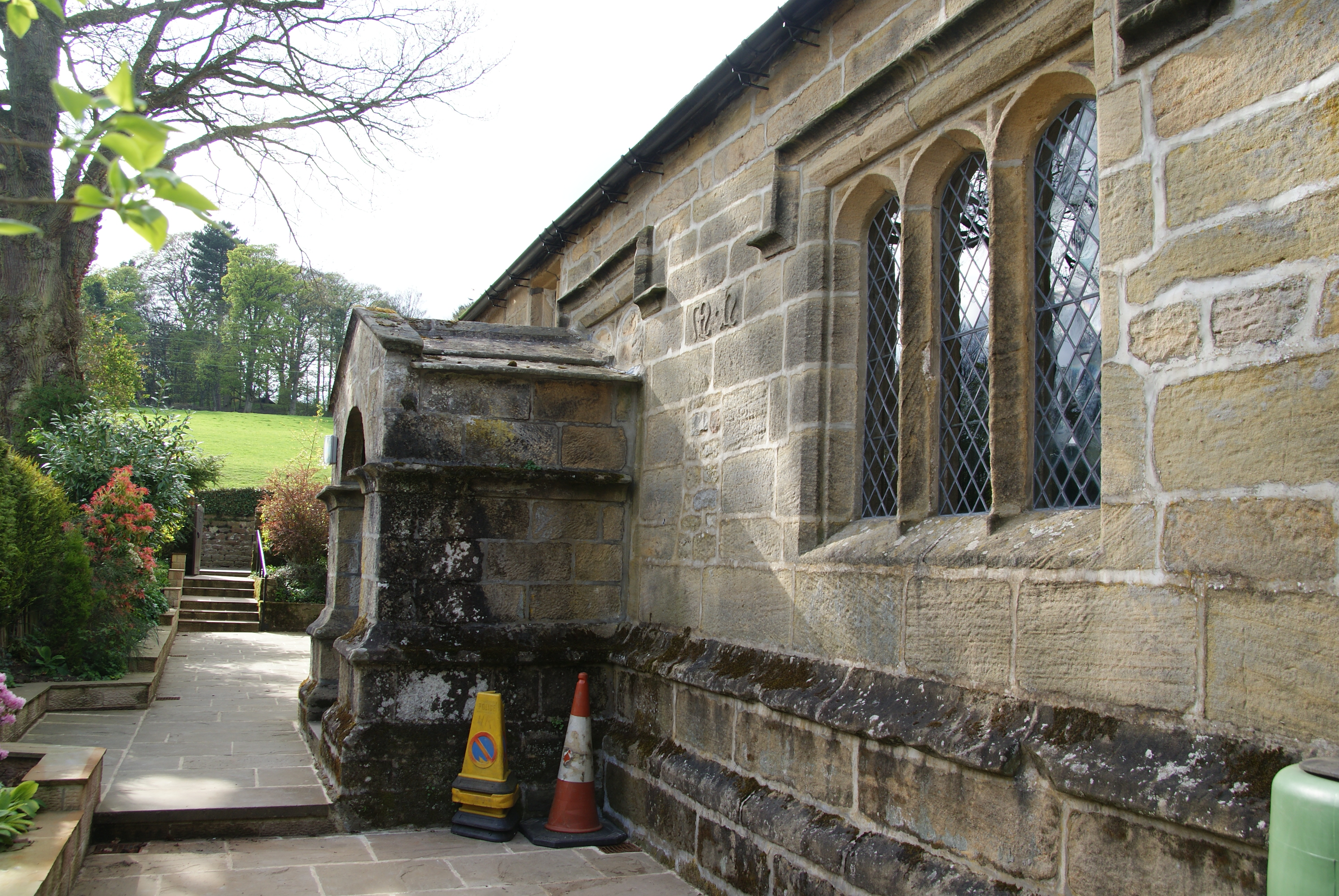
The chapel range, in 2011

The building is built of gritstone, and has a stone slate roof. The chapel has a single storey, two bays, a plinth, and windows with straight heads and four-centred arched lights. It has a 19th-century porch, which is believed to reuse some 16th century stone. There are relief carvings on the sides, and a bellcote on the right gable. The house has a single storey and an attic, and three bays. The doorway has a chamfered surround, a four-centred arched head and a hood mould, and the windows have chamfered mullions and hood moulds.

== See also ==
- Grade II* listed buildings in North Yorkshire (district)
- Listed buildings in Bewerley
