= Bewerley Old Hall =

Building in Bewerley, North Yorkshire, England

Coordinates: 54°04′41″N 1°45′26″W

Bewerley Old Hall, also known as the Priest's House, or in the early 20th century as Tudor House, is a historic building in Bewerley, a village in North Yorkshire, in England.

The house was built by Father Hicks in the late 16th or early 17th century, as the village's manor house. In 1681, it passed to the Inman family, and then in 1774 to John Yorke. In 1815, a new hall was built, and the old hall became the house of its gardener. To its east side were two large walled gardens, one with box hedges in the Elizabethan style, which was removed in 1975. The house was Grade II* listed in 1952, but views differ on its merits: Historic England research records describe it as "of little architectural merit", but Nikolaus Pevsner described it as a "fine C17 house".

The house has a timber-framed core, and is in gritstone, with a moulded string course, and a stone slate roof with gable copings, and shaped kneelers. There are two storeys and three bays, and an additional later two-storey porch with a hipped roof. The ground floor of the porch is open, with two Tuscan columns, and it contains chamfered mullioned windows. The doorway has a chamfered quoined surround, and the windows are recessed, with chamfered mullions and hood moulds. Inside, the porch ceiling has a relief of a woman in 17th century clothing, while the house has original fireplaces, and much early plasterwork.

== See also ==
- Grade II* listed buildings in North Yorkshire (district)
- Listed buildings in Bewerley
