= Listed buildings in Marton-le-Moor =

Marton-le-Moor is a civil parish in the county of North Yorkshire, England. It contains six listed buildings that are recorded in the National Heritage List for England. All the listed buildings are designated at Grade II, the lowest of the three grades, which is applied to "buildings of national importance and special interest". The parish contains the village of Marton-le-Moor and the surrounding area. All the listed buildings are in the village, and consist of houses, farmhouses and associated structures, and a church.

== Buildings ==
| Name and location | Photograph | Date | Notes |
|---|---|---|---|
| Manor House; 54.12985°N 1.43541°W | | Early 18th century | The older part of the house is the rear service wing, the main block added in the early to mid-19th century. The house is in brick, the rear wing is rendered, and the roof is in Westmorland slate. The main block has two storeys and five bays, a stone plinth, a floor band, a modillion eaves cornice and a hipped roof. Steps lead up to the central doorway that has attached Doric columns, a fanlight, an entablature and a cornice, and above it is a scrolled wrought iron balcony. The windows are sashes with gauged flat brick arches. The rear wing has two storeys and two bays. |
| Rose Green Cottage; 54.12991°N 1.43434°W | — | Early to mid-18th century | The house is in limestone and cobbles, and has a pantile roof with stone gable copings and shaped kneelers. There are two storeys, three bays, and a rear outshut. On the front is a doorway with a stone surround, and the windows are horizontally-sliding sashes with flat heads. |
| Grange Farmhouse; 54.12974°N 1.43344°W | — | Early 19th century | The farmhouse is in brick, with an eaves cornice, and a stone slate roof with shaped kneelers and gable coping. There are two storeys and three bays, and a lower two-storey two-bay service wing on the left. In the centre of the main range is a doorway with a fanlight and a cornice. It is flanked by canted bay windows containing sashes, and on the upper floor are sash windows in architraves with wedge lintels. |
| Wall, railings and gates, Grange Farmhouse; 54.12999°N 1.43357°W | — | Early 19th century | The front garden wall is in sandstone, it extends for about 50 metres (160 ft), it is about 1.5 metres (4 ft 11 in) tall, and has rounded coping. The railings, gates and gate piers are in wrought iron. The piers have a square section, scrolled decoration, and pyramidal finials with a leaf motif. |
| Marton Church; 54.12845°N 1.43320°W | | 1830 | The church is in white limestone on the front, with grey limestone at the rear, and a stone slate roof with shaped kneelers and gable copings. It consists of a nave and a chancel under one roof, and a west porch. On the west gable is a bellcote. The door and the windows have pointed arches. |
| Newbuildings Farmhouse; 54.13047°N 1.43233°W | — | Early to mid-19th century | The farmhouse is in limestone, with split cobbles in the left return, and a grey slate roof with shaped kneelers and gable copings. There are two storeys and three bays. In the centre is a round-headed doorway with a shouldered and banded architrave, a radial fanlight and a keystone. The windows are sashes with architraves and channelled lintels. |
