= Listed buildings in Bewerley =

Bewerley is a civil parish in Nidderdale in North Yorkshire, England. It contains 23 listed buildings that are recorded in the National Heritage List for England. Of these, two are listed at Grade II*, the middle of the three grades, and the others are at Grade II, the lowest grade. The parish contains the villages of Bewerley and Greenhow, the built-up area of Pateley Bridge west of the River Nidd, and the surrounding area. Most of the listed buildings are houses and associated structures, cottages, farmhouses and farm buildings. The others include bridges, a folly, the entrance to a former lead mine, and a former watermill.

== Key ==
Grade	Criteria
II*	Particularly important buildings of more than special interest
II	Buildings of national importance and special interest

== Buildings ==
Name and location	Photograph	Date	Notes	Grade
Bewerley Grange; 54.07835°N 1.76035°W		Early 16th century	Originally a chapel for the monks of Fountains Abbey, it was later extended and used for other purposes, at one time a school. It is in gritstone, and has a stone slate roof with coped gables. The building consists of one long range, with the chapel to the right and a house to the left. The chapel has a single storey, two bays, a plinth, a gabled porch, and windows with straight heads and four-centred arched lights. There are relief carvings on the sides, and a bellcote on the right gable. The house has a single storey and an attic, and three bays. The doorway has a chamfered surround, a four-centred arched head and a hood mould, and the windows have chamfered mullions and hood moulds.	II*
Bewerley Old Hall; 54.07801°N 1.75716°W	—	Late 16th to early 17th century	The house has a timber-framed core, and is in gritstone, with a moulded string course, and a stone slate roof with gable copings, and shaped kneelers. There are two storeys and three bays, and an additional later two-storey porch with a hipped roof. The ground floor of the porch is open, with two Tuscan columns, and it contains chamfered mullioned windows. The doorway has a chamfered quoined surround, and the windows are recessed, with chamfered mullions and hood moulds.	II*
Bridge, Bewerley Old Hall; 54.07749°N 1.75718°W	—	17th century or earlier	The bridge is in gritstone, and consists of a single segmental arch. It has recessed voussoirs, a band, and a slightly humpbacked parapet with rounded coping.	II
Sundial, Bewerley Old Hall; 54.07786°N 1.75709°W	—	17th century (probable)	The sundial in the garden to the south of the house is in gritstone, and is about 1.2 metres (3 ft 11 in) high. It has a polygonal base, a square plinth, a cylindrical shaft with roll moulding to the base, neck and cap, and is surmounted by a bronze dial and gnomon.	II
Brandstone Scar; 54.07882°N 1.78066°W	—	Mid 17th century	The house is in gritstone, and has a stone slate roof with shaped kneelers. There are two storeys and three bays. The central doorway has a moulded chamfered surround and a four-centred arched head. The windows have chamfered mullions, and continuous hood moulds with concave moulding.	II
Hole Bottom House and barn 54.08213°N 1.80732°W	—	Mid to late 17th century	The house and barn are in gritstone, and have a roof of stone slate with coped gables, shaped kneelers and ball finials. The house has a chamfered plinth, quoins, two storeys, four bays, a three-storey projecting porch, and an added bay to the left. The porch has a doorway with a quoined surround, and an incised lintel. The upper floor projects on corbels, and contains three-light chamfered mullioned windows. The main range has similar windows and a round-headed window. The barn has three bays, a central cart entrance with quoined jambs and a segmental arch, and a door with a quoined surround.	II
Duck Street Cottage; 54.06943°N 1.82752°W	—	1673	A row of cottages and outbuildings in gritstone, with a stone slate roof and coped gables. It consists of a two-storey single-bay cottage with a lean-to, a two-storey two-bay cottage, a tall barn with two bays, and a two-storey single-bay outbuilding. The left cottage has a mullioned window, and in the barn is a cart entrance with jambs formed from quoins and narrow blocks, and a segmental arch with voussoirs.	II
Garden wall and gateway, Bewerley Old Hall; 54.07780°N 1.75697°W	—	18th century	The wall is in gritstone, it is coped, and ramped five times down a slope. The gateway has quoined jambs and a flat arch, the wall carried over it as a stepped parapet. On the west side is a square stone panel in a projecting surround, and on the parapet are pieces of sculpted stone.	II
Haver Garth; 54.07619°N 1.77473°W		Mid 18th century	A row containing a farmhouse and farm buildings, in gritstone, with a roof of stone slate, flanked by coped gables and moulded kneelers. The range consists of a two-storey, three-bay range of stables or byres, a two-storey, three-bay house, and a two-bay barn and byre. The house has mullioned windows. The farm buildings to the left contain pitching holes and a round-arched loading door with a keystone, and to the right are doorways with quoined jambs, one with a segmental arch, and a pigeon loft entrance.	II
Willow Croft; 54.08405°N 1.76326°W	—	Mid 18th century	The house is in gritstone with quoins and a stone slate roof. There are two storeys and two bays. In the centre is a gabled porch with Tuscan columns and a triangular pediment with a ball finial, and the doorway has tie-stones. The mullions have been removed from the windows and casements inserted.	II
Yorke's Folly; 54.06740°N 1.75804°W		Mid 18th century	The folly is in gritstone, and designed to appear like part of a ruined church. It consists of two shafts about 15 metres (49 ft) high with an L-shaped plan. These include deeply-chamfered quoins and the springers for arches.	II
Hillside; 54.07232°N 1.82906°W	—	Mid to late 18th century	A house in gritstone with quoins, and a stone slate roof with gable copings and shaped kneelers. There are two storeys, two bays, and a lean-to on the left. The doorway has a surround of long and short quoins, the windows on the front are horizontally-sliding sashes, and at the rear is a window with a transom and a cross window.	II
Turner Bridge; 54.07654°N 1.75984°W		Late 18th to early 19th century	The bridge, which carries a road over Fosse Gill, is in gritstone. It consists of a single segmental arch, with cutwaters carried up as pilasters to the parapet coping, and there is a projecting band at road level.	II
Grassfield House Hotel; 54.08821°N 1.76886°W		1810	A house, later a hotel, in stone with a sill band, moulded eaves, a pediment cornice, and a hipped slate roof. There are two storeys, a front of five bays, the middle three bays protecting under a pediment, and three bays on the sides. At the rear is a two-bay range, and to the left is a single-bay extension. In the centre is a doorcase with Tuscan columns, an entablature, a cornice and a blocking course. The doorway has a moulded architrave with imposts, and a fanlight. The windows are sashes with projecting sills and incised lintels.	II
Bewerley House and arch 54.07942°N 1.75948°W	—	c. 1820	Originally an estate office, the house is in gritstone with moulded eaves, an embattled parapet, and a grey slate roof with coped gables and shaped kneelers. There are two storeys, three bays, and a single-storey extension on the left. The round-arched doorway has a fanlight and a keystone, and the windows are sashes. To the left is a later Gothic arch with an impost band, cylindrical towers, and an embattled parapet, flanked by lower pedestrian gates and cruciform blind recesses.	II
Throstle Nest Bridge and Perseverance Level Entrance; 54.08653°N 1.79662°W		1825	A bridge and the entrance to a lead mine in stone. They consist of a pair of arches joined by a long abutment, with a segmental arch over a beck, and a small round arch over the entrance. Over the latter is an inscription and the date, and above them all is a band and a parapet.	II
Grassfield Cottage; 54.09082°N 1.77103°W	—	Early 19th century	The house is in gritstone, and has a stone slate roof with gable copings and shaped kneelers. There are two storeys and three bays, and a two-bay projecting service wing on the left. The central doorway has a fanlight and the windows are sashes, all with pointed arches.	II
Foster Beck Mill; 54.09345°N 1.77577°W		1864	Originally a water mill, at one time an inn and later converted for other uses, it is in gritstone, with stone gutter brackets, and a grey slate roof with gable coping. There are two storeys and twelve bays. On the front is a gabled porch, and to its right is a carriage arch. Most of the windows are centre-hinged, and here are two sash windows. Attached to the left gable end is a large breast-shot waterwheel with a diameter of 35 feet (11 m), and stone steps leading to the hub and a header tank.	II
Farmhouse, wall and gate piers, The Farmstead; 54.07636°N 1.75102°W		1870	The farmhouse is in sandstone, with an eaves cornice, and a Welsh slate roof, hipped on the right, and with gable copings on the left. There are two storeys and an attic, three bays, and a rear wing on the left. The central doorway has a fanlight and a hood mould, and the windows are sashes. In the right return is a round-headed stair window. The wall encloses the garden to the front and on the right, and has chamfered copings. The gate piers are monolithic with round heads, and between them are iron gates with scroll cresting.	II
Barn and cowhouse, The Farmstead; 54.07664°N 1.75064°W	—	1870	The barn and cowshed are in sandstone with a Welsh slate roof. There are two storeys, a U-shaped plan, a main range of eleven bays with the cowhouse in an undercroft, and flanking wings. On the south side is a raised five-bay arcade with square tapering columns, and round arches with imposts. To the left is a large square-headed cart entrance, a casement window and pigeon holes. Elsewhere, there are segmental-arched openings, slit vents, a door with a quoined surround, and a dated and initialled lintel.	II
Former barn, The Farmstead; 54.07663°N 1.75119°W	—	c. 1870	The barn, later used for other purposes, is in sandstone with a hipped Welsh slate roof. It is tall, with a single storey and approximately three bays. On the south side is a sliding door under a massive stone lintel, to its right is a slatted casement window, and above are slit vents and a square hatch. On the east side is a small doorway.	II
Farm buildings, wall, railings and gateway, The Farmstead; 54.07645°N 1.75113°W	—	c. 1870	The farm buildings are in sandstone with Welsh slate roofs. They form a U-shaped plan, with a two-storey main range and a single-storey wings, with walls and railings enclosing a yard. The main range has casement windows and external steps, and elsewhere are quoined openings, vents and an internal water trough. Walls with railings enclose more yards and an orchard.	II
Garden Tower, Abbey Lodge; 54.07832°N 1.75941°W	—	Late 19th century	A remaining part of the demolished Bewerley Hall, it is a round stone tower with two storeys and a moulded parapet. On the east front are two casement windows, and on the south front is a lancet window, all with Tudor hood moulds. There is a doorway on the north front.	II
