= Warsill =

Civil parish in North Yorkshire, England

Coordinates: 54.08°N 1.65°W

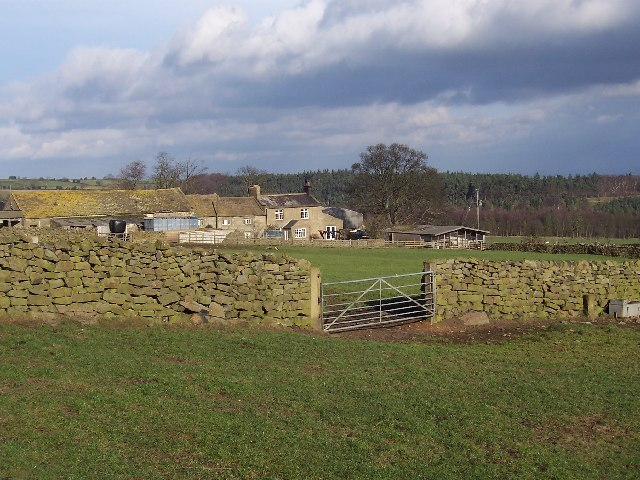
- Warsill Hall Farm

- Population: 70 (2015)
- OS grid reference: SE226651
- Civil parish: Warsill
- Unitary authority: North Yorkshire
- Ceremonial county: North Yorkshire
- Region: Yorkshire and the Humber
- Country: England
- Sovereign state: United Kingdom
- Post town: HARROGATE
- Postcode district: HG3
- Police: North Yorkshire
- Fire: North Yorkshire
- Ambulance: Yorkshire
- UK Parliament: Skipton and Ripon

Warsill is a settlement and civil parish in the county of North Yorkshire, England. It consists of a few scattered farms 5 miles (8 km) south west of Ripon. In 1961 the population of the parish was 42. The population was estimated at 70 in 2015.

Warsill was historically an extra parochial area. It became a civil parish in 1858. Today it shares a grouped parish council with Bishop Thornton. From 1974 to 2023 it was part of the Borough of Harrogate, it is now administered by the unitary North Yorkshire Council.

The toponym, first recorded in 1132 as Warthsala, probably derives from the Old English weard sæl, meaning "watch castle". In the Middle Ages there was a grange of Fountains Abbey here, later the home of Stephen Proctor. Warsill Hall Farmhouse, a 17th-century Grade II listed building, now stands on its site.

The Abbey Grange at Warsill included a dairy farm, providing milk and cheese to the Abbey, and there were also sheep, with wethers kept over winter. In 1526, Peter and Agnes Smyth, employed as the keepers of Warsill, had a plough for arable.

== See also ==
- Listed buildings in Bishop Thornton, Shaw Mills and Warsill
