= St Joseph's Church, Bishop Thornton =

Church in Bishop Thornton, North Yorkshire, England

Coordinates: 54°03′56″N 1°36′11″W

St Joseph's Church is a Catholic church in Bishop Thornton, a village in North Yorkshire, in England.

The existence of Catholic worship in Bishop Thornton is attested from at least 1746. In 1790, a presbytery was built for Richard Talbot and Charles Saul, on land donated by Stephen Ingilby. It has a decorative staircase leading up to a windowless room, where it is presumed that mass was said. In 1809, a church was built onto the presbytery. It was restored by Weightman & Brown from 1980 to 1981, and the whole structure was Grade II listed in 1986. It is the oldest purpose-built church in the Roman Catholic Diocese of Leeds.

Both the church and presbytery are built of gritstone with tile roofs. The presbytery has two storeys and attics, and three bays, a central porch and mullioned windows. The church to the right has four bays, round-headed windows, a porch at the east end, and a gable cross. Inside, most of the furnishing date to between 1875 and 1929, the period when Herman Geurts served as priest. The stained glass dates from the mid-20th century, and is by Hardman & Co. The church also contains a slab from the Mediaeval altar of Walworth Chapel.

== See also ==
- Listed buildings in Bishop Thornton, Shaw Mills and Warsill
