= Listed buildings in Winksley =

Winksley is a civil parish in the county of North Yorkshire, England. It contains four listed buildings that are recorded in the National Heritage List for England. All the listed buildings are designated at Grade II, the lowest of the three grades, which is applied to "buildings of national importance and special interest". The parish contains the village of Winksley and the surrounding area, and the listed buildings consist of a church, and three farmhouses with associated structures.

== Buildings ==
Name and location	Photograph	Date	Notes
Manor House Farmhouse with outbuilding 54.13631°N 1.62083°W	—	17th century	The farmhouse is in gritstone, and has roofs of stone slate and pantile with shaped kneelers and stone gable coping. There are two storeys and attics, and three bays. The doorway has a chamfered surround and an initialled lintel, and the windows are horizontally sliding sashes. The attached outbuilding has two stable doors and external steps to an upper floor door in the gable end.
Winksley Hall Farmhouse; 54.13579°N 1.61800°W	—	1704	The farmhouse is in gritstone, with quoins and a stone slate roof, and it contains some earlier internal timber framing. There are two storeys and four bays. The central doorway has been blocked, and a window inserted, it has a moulded shouldered architrave and an initialled datestone, and to the right is a later stable door. The windows on the front are sashes, those to the left of the doorway are horizontally sliding. At the rear are recessed chamfered mullioned windows.
West View Farmhouse; 54.13700°N 1.61727°W	—	Mid to late 18th century	The farmhouse is in gritstone, with quoins, and a stone slate roof with coping and shaped kneelers. There are two storeys, two bays, and a rear wing. The central doorway has a chamfered surround, above it is a narrow blocked window, and the other windows are small paned.
St Cuthbert and St Oswald's Church; 54.13653°N 1.61523°W		1914–17	The church is built in gritstone with a stone slate roof, and is in Perpendicular style. It consists of a nave with narrow north and south aisles incorporated into it, a chancel with a south vestry and a north organ chamber, and a west tower. The tower has three stages, with north and south porches, a south stair turret, buttresses, bands, and an irregular indented parapet. There are similar parapets on the body of the church.
