= St Mary's Church, Marton-le-Moor =

Church building in North Yorkshire, England

Coordinates: 54°07′42″N 1°26′00″W

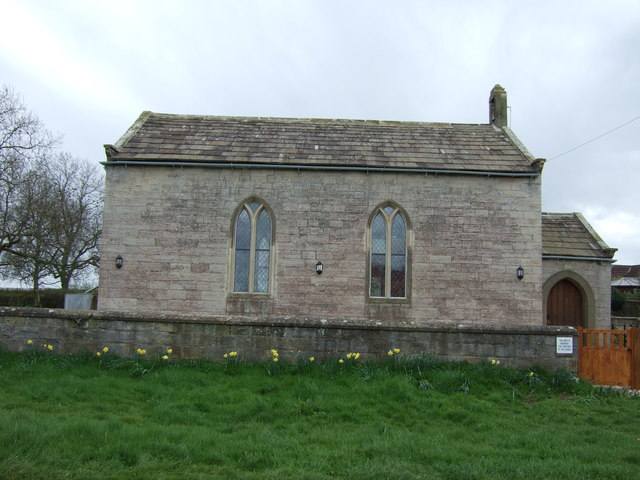
The church, in 2012

St Mary's Church is a deconsecrated Anglican church in Marton-le-Moor, a village in North Yorkshire, in England.

There was a church in Marton-le-Moor in the Mediaeval period. It was rebuilt on the same site in 1830 at a cost of £130. In 1851, it could seat 160 parishioners, and had an average attendance of 50 each Sunday. The building was grade II listed in 1987. It closed in 2005, with items including the organ being moved to St John's Church, Sharow. In 2009, it was sold for conversion into a house, despite having no electric or water supply.

The church is built of white limestone on the front, with grey limestone at the rear, and a stone slate roof with shaped kneelers and gable copings. It consists of a nave and a chancel under one roof, and a west porch. On the west gable is a bellcote. The door and the windows have pointed arches.

== See also ==
- Listed buildings in Marton-le-Moor
