= Listed buildings in Azerley =

Azerley is a civil parish in the county of North Yorkshire, England. It contains 17 listed buildings that are recorded in the National Heritage List for England. All the listed buildings are designated at Grade II, the lowest of the three grades, which is applied to "buildings of national importance and special interest". The parish contains the villages of Azerley, Galphay and Mickley, and the surrounding countryside. The listed buildings include houses and cottages, farmhouses and farm buildings, a bridge, a watermill, a church and its former vicarage, a former chapel, and a folly and watch tower.

== Buildings ==
Name and location	Photograph	Date	Notes
Braithwaite Hall; 54.15599°N 1.62135°W		16th century (probable)	A house that has been altered, it is in stone, rendered on the front, and has a stone slate roof. There are two storeys and four bays, with a continuous rear outshut. The doorway has a chamfered quoined surround, and an initialled and dated lintel. The windows are horizontally-sliding sashes with chamfered surrounds, and at the rear are dormers.
Cowmyers; 54.14885°N 1.59145°W	—	Mid 17th century	A farmhouse, later a private house, in limestone on the front and cobbles elsewhere, that has a pantile roof with two courses of stone slates and gable copings. There are two storeys and an attic, and three bays. The doorway has a chamfered quoined surround and a large lintel, and the windows are casements with chamfered surrounds.
Witch of the Woods House; 54.15400°N 1.59149°W		17th century	The house is in cobbles with a pantile roof. There are two storeys, two bays, and a single-storey extension on the right. In the centre is a gabled porch. The ground floor contains double-chamfered mullioned windows and a fire window, and above are casements. In the gable end is a datestone.
Dormer Cottage; 54.14881°N 1.61628°W	—	1712 and earlier	The house has a cruck core, with walls in stone, quoins, and a stone slate roof. There are two storeys and three bays. The doorway has a moulded surround and a dated and initialled lintel. To its right is a sash window in an architrave, above it is a 20th-century dormer, and the other windows have chamfered surrounds. Inside the house are the remains of cruck blades.
Hillcrest; 54.14910°N 1.61291°W	—	Early 18th century	The house, possibly earlier a bobbin mill, is in gritstone with a pantile roof. There are two storeys and an attic, and three bays. In the centre is a doorway, and the windows in the front are sashes. At the rear and in the left return are two-light double-chamfered mullioned windows, and at the rear is a round-headed stair window. On the right return is a flight of steps.
Stables, Azerley Chase House; 54.16570°N 1.60746°W	—	Late 18th century	The stables are in stone with a pantile roof. They form a courtyard plan, the entrance range on the east with two storeys and five bays, the middle bay containing a carriage arch.
Gate Bridge; 54.14705°N 1.63194°W		Late 18th century	The bridge carries Gate Bridge Road over the River Laver. It is in gritstone and consists of a single segmental arch. The bridge is flanked by shallow pilasters rising to shallow pointed coping, and the roadside walls end in bollards with flat caps.
Prospect House; 54.14940°N 1.61324°W	—	Late 18th century	A house in gritstone that has a stone slate roof with coping and shaped kneelers. There are two storeys, three bays, and flanking outshuts. The central doorway has a lintel with a keystone, and a gabled hood, and the windows are top-hung casements.
Orchard House; 54.14897°N 1.61235°W	—	Late 18th to early 19th century	The house is in stone, with chamfered rusticated quoins, and a slate roof with copings. There are two storeys and three bays, and a single-storey outshut on the right. On the front are two doorways, the left blocked, both with decorated lintels. Most of the windows are horizontally-sliding sashes, and at the rear is a round-headed stair window. A small range of outbuildings is attached to the house by a wall.
Gate Bridge Mill; 54.14732°N 1.63346°W		Early 19th century (probable)	A watermill in gritstone that has a Westmorland slate roof with a stone ridge. There are two storeys, two bays, and a lower bay to the left. The openings include board doors, garage doors, fixed windows and a casement window. At the rear is a lean-to wheelhouse with a breast-shot waterwheel.
Gate Bridge Mill House; 54.14719°N 1.63333°W		Early 19th century	The house is in gritstone, with stone gutter supports, and a tile roof with gable coping and shaped kneelers. There are two storeys and three bays. In the centre is a doorway, above it is a small-pane window, and the other windows are sashes.
Holmgrange; 54.14899°N 1.61422°W	—	Early 19th century	A house in gritstone, with quoins, a floor band, an eaves band, and a concrete slate roof with gable coping and shaped kneelers. In the centre is a doorway with a quoined surround and a five-part lintel, and at the rear is a blocked doorway with a lintel and a keystone.
Former Methodist Chapel; 54.18823°N 1.60652°W		Early 19th century	The chapel, later in residential use, is in rendered gritstone, with quoins, stone gutter brackets, and a pantile roof with gable coping and shaped kneelers. The central doorway is flanked by round-arched sash windows with imposts and keystones, and above the door is a defaced datestone.
Azerley Tower; 54.16297°N 1.59332°W		1839	A folly and watch tower in cobbles and limestone, with gritstone dressings and quoins, and a stone slate roof. At the base is a cottage with a single storey, a T-shaped plan, three bays, and a rear wing. It has a central doorway with a Gothic arch, quoined jambs, and a hood mould, and is flanked by cross windows with quoined surrounds and hood moulds. The square tower arises from the centre of the south side, it has two stages, narrow windows, moulded bands, and an embattled parapet.
St John's Church, Mickley; 54.18813°N 1.61166°W		1841	The church is built in split cobbles, with stone dressings and a purple slate roof. It consists of a four-bay nave, a south porch, and a single-bay chancel, with a bellcote on the west gable. The porch is gabled and has an arched entrance with a chamfered surround. The windows on the sides are lancets alternating with stepped buttresses, at the east end are three lancets.
The Old Vicarage; 54.18814°N 1.61125°W	—	Mid 19th century	The vicarage, later a private house, is in split cobbles, with stone dressings, quoins and a Westmorland slate roof. There are two storeys and an attic, and three bays, the outer bays projecting as gabled wings. The doorway has a Gothic arch, a shield above, and narrow flanking lights. The other windows are cross windows, and there is a small dormer.
Hay barn, Azerley Park; 54.16592°N 1.60796°W	—	Mid to late 19th century	The barn is in red brick, with an eaves course of stone slate, and a pantile roof with gable coping. It is a tall building with five bays. The spaces between the piers on the west side are infilled with brick and stone walling, and in the gable ends are clay pipes for ventilation.
