= Listed buildings in Clint cum Hamlets =

Clint cum Hamlets is a civil parish in the county of North Yorkshire, England. It contains eleven listed buildings that are recorded in the National Heritage List for England. All the listed buildings are designated at Grade II, the lowest of the three grades, which is applied to "buildings of national importance and special interest". The parish contains the settlements of Bedlam, Burnt Yates and Clint, and the surrounding countryside. The listed buildings consist of houses, farmhouses and farm buildings, a cross base and stocks, a school and a sundial in its grounds, and two bridges.

== Buildings ==
Name and location	Photograph	Date	Notes
Cross base and stocks 54.03378°N 1.60320°W		Medieval	The cross base is in gritstone, and consists of three steps and a square socket stone, in all about 1.5 metres (4 ft 11 in) high. On the two top steps are inscriptions. The stocks have two stone shafts about 1.2 metres (3 ft 11 in) high, with grooves on the internal faces. The wooden rail with two leg holes was inserted later.
Rose Cottage; 54.04895°N 1.59207°W	—	Mid to late 17th century	The house has a timber framed core, it is encased in stone, and has a roof of small slates. There are two storeys and three bays. The doorway has a wooden lintel, and most of the windows have been altered, with mullions removed and casements inserted.
Beckside Farmhouse; 54.05623°N 1.59913°W	—	Late 17th to early 18th century	The farmhouse is in stone, and has a stone slate roof with coped gables, shaped kneelers, and ball finials. There are two storeys and four bays, and a two-bay rear wing. On the front is a two-story porch containing a doorway that has a lintel with a shallow four-centred arch, above which is a datestone, a three-light window and a small circular window in the gable. Throughout there are recessed chamfered mullioned windows, one with a re-set lintel and a hood mould.
Whipley Hall; 54.04409°N 1.59645°W	—	Mid 18th century	A house in gritstone, with rusticated quoins, a sill band, and a purple slate roof with eaves courses in stone slate, coped gables and shaped kneelers. There are two storeys and two bays, and a single-storey bay on the left. The central doorway has rusticated quoined to the jambs and rusticated voussoirs to the lintel. The windows are casements.
Burnt Yates School; 54.04660°N 1.61794°W		1760	Additions were made to the school in 1763 and in 1849. It is in gritstone, the roof of the earlier parts is in stone slate, with stone coping and a shaped kneeler, and the later part is in blue slate. The original part has two tall storeys and two bays, the 1763 extension to the left is of the same height, with three storeys and two bays, and the latest extension is at right angles to the right and has a single tall storey. In the original part are floor bands and a doorway with a quoined surround, above which is an inscribed crest, and both earlier parts have quoins. The latest part has a porch, a date plaque, and a bellcote. In all parts are windows that are mullioned, or mullioned and transomed.
Scarah Bank Farmhouse; 54.05047°N 1.58629°W		Mid to late 18th century	A house and a barn, later combined, in gritstone, with a stone slate roof, coped gables and shaped kneelers, and two storeys. The house has two bays, quoins, a central doorway with a plain surround, and sash windows. The former barn has four bays, and contains doorways and 20th-century windows.
Clint Hall Farmhouse; 54.03324°N 1.61377°W	—	Late 18th century	The farmhouse is in gritstone, with quoins, and a stone slate roof with gable coping and shaped kneelers. There are two storeys and three bays, and a recessed two-bay service wing to the right. The windows in the main range are sashes, and in the service wing is a casement window.
Scarah Bridge; 54.04932°N 1.58064°W		Late 18th century	The bridge carries the B6165 road over Thornton Beck. It is in gritstone, and consists of a central segmental arch flanked by lower side arches, all with recessed voussoirs. The bridge has triangular cutwaters, and a slightly projecting parapet with rounded coping.
Sundial, Burnt Yates School; 54.04647°N 1.61791°W	—	1828 or earlier	The sundial in the grounds of the school is in gritstone, and about 1.2 metres (3 ft 11 in) high. It has a square base, and a shaft with roll-moulding. The separate cap is incised with numerals, initials and a date, and the gnomon is in bronze.
Bridge over Thornton Beck; 54.05724°N 1.61001°W		Early to mid 19th century	The bridge carries Pye Lane over the stream. It is in gritstone and consists of a single arch. The bridge has rusticated voussoirs, a band, a coped parapet, and circular bollards at the parapet ends.
Rose Lea Farmhouse and barn 54.04753°N 1.60861°W		Early to mid 19th century	A laithehouse in gritstone, with quoins, and a stone slate roof with coped gables and shaped kneelers. It consists of a house with two storeys and two bays, and a barn with a byre on the right. The house has a central doorway with a quoined surround and sash windows. The barn contains a cart entrance with quoined jambs and a flat arch with splayed voussoirs, a byre door with quoined jambs, and slit vents.
