= Shaw Mills =

Hamlet in North Yorkshire, England

Coordinates: 54.055°N 1.610°W

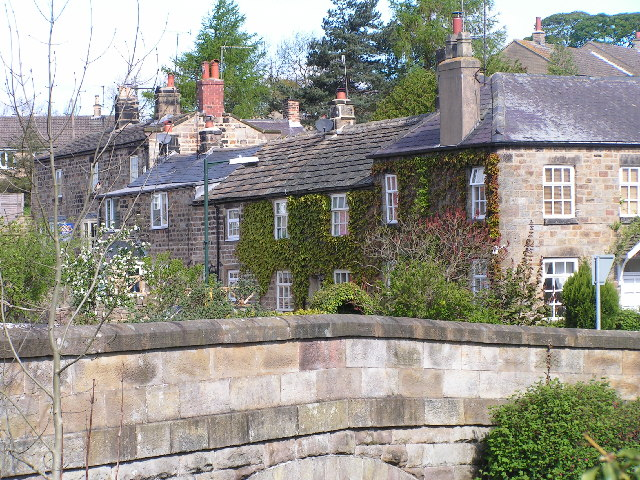

- Location within North Yorkshire
- OS grid reference: SE256625
- Civil parish: Bishop Thornton
- Unitary authority: North Yorkshire
- Ceremonial county: North Yorkshire
- Region: Yorkshire and the Humber
- Country: England
- Sovereign state: United Kingdom
- Post town: HARROGATE
- Postcode district: HG3
- Police: North Yorkshire
- Fire: North Yorkshire
- Ambulance: Yorkshire
- UK Parliament: Skipton and Ripon

Shaw Mills is a hamlet in the civil parish of Bishop Thornton, in Nidderdale in the county of North Yorkshire, England. It lies in the valley of Thornton Beck, a tributary of the River Nidd, 6 miles (10 km) north west of Harrogate.

The village probably takes its name from a corn mill kept by one Robert Shaw in the 16th century. In 1812 John and George Metcalfe began spinning flax in the Low Mill at Shaw Mills The High Mill and Low Mill both closed by 1861, but in about 1890 were restarted for silk-spinning. The mills closed soon after the First World War. An industrial settlement developed in the 19th century to serve the mills.

Until 1974 it was part of the West Riding of Yorkshire. From 1974 to 2023 it was part of the Borough of Harrogate, it is now administered by the unitary North Yorkshire Council.

== See also ==
- Listed buildings in Bishop Thornton, Shaw Mills and Warsill

== Sources ==
- Jennings, Bernard (1992). A History of Nidderdale. ISBN 1 85072 114 9.
