= Listed buildings in Bishop Thornton, Shaw Mills and Warsill =

Bishop Thornton, Shaw Mills and Warsill is the area served by Bishop Thornton, Shaw Mills and Warsill parish council in the county of North Yorkshire, England. The area contains the civil parishes of Bishop Thornton (which includes the settlements of Bishop Thornton and Shaw Mills, and the surrounding countryside), and Warsill (an area of scattered houses and countryside). The area contains 18 listed buildings that are recorded in the National Heritage List for England. All the listed buildings are designated at Grade II, the lowest of the three grades, which is applied to "buildings of national importance and special interest". The listed buildings include houses, cottages and associated structures, farmhouses and farm buildings, a church and its presbytery, the tower of a demolished church, a former public house, a former watermill, a water tank and a well head.

== Buildings ==
Name and location	Photograph	Date	Notes
Mill House; 54.05757°N 1.61107°W	—	17th century	The house, which was largely rebuilt and extended in the 19th century, is in gritstone, with a stone slate roof. There are two storeys, three bays, and later rear outshuts. The doorway and windows have sawn-stone surrounds, and in the outshuts are dormers.
Raventofts Hall; 54.08011°N 1.60397°W	—	17th century (or earlier)	The house is in gritstone, and has a purple slate roof with gable coping. There are two storeys and a T-shaped plan, consisting of a range of three bays, a lower bay to the right, and a rear range. On the front is a gabled porch, and the windows are a mix, including a casement window, a sash window, chamfered mullioned windows, and fixed light windows.
Watergate; 54.08309°N 1.59688°W		1665	The house, which was extensively rebuilt in 1888, is in gritstone, with quoins, and a Westmorland slate roof with gable copings and kneelers. There are two storeys, a range of two bays, and a large projecting gabled wing on the right. On the front is a two-storey gabled porch, containing an entrance with a chamfered surround, an ornate lintel with a scalloped lower edge and an initialled and dated panel, and a hood mould, over which is a stepped three-light mullioned window with a stepped hood mould. Most of the other windows are double-chamfered and mullioned with hood moulds. In the apex of the gable end is a round-headed window and a datestone.
Warsill Hall Farmhouse; 54.08913°N 1.64163°W	—	Mid to late 17th century	A house, later a farm building, in gritstone, with a stone slate roof, two storeys and three bays. The central doorway has a plain surround, and the windows are recessed, chamfered and mullioned, those in the upper floor with hood moulds.
Dole Bank Farmhouse; 54.07263°N 1.58099°W		1670	A rendered house with stone gutter brackets and a Westmorland slate roof. There are two storeys and three bays, a later slightly recessed bay to the left, and a rear wing. The central doorway has long and short jamb stones, and an elaborately carved lintel. The windows in the main range are sashes in architraves, the window above the doorway with a round-arched head. In the right return is a datestone with carved crosses. The rear wing contains recessed mullioned windows with hood moulds, and a limestone plaque with a coat of arms.
Outbuilding, Dole Bank Farm; 54.07278°N 1.58122°W		Late 17th century	The outbuilding is in sandstone and gritstone, with quoins and a stone slate roof. There are two storeys and four bays, the second bay projecting. The building contains stable doors with large lintels, and windows, one of which is semicircular, and the others are mullioned.
Thornton Grange; 54.06057°N 1.61075°W	—	1726	A house and a cottage in gritstone with quoins and a Westmorland slate roof. There are two storeys, the house has two bays and the cottage to the left has one bay. In the centre of the house is a porch, and to the left is a blocked doorway that has a decorated chamfered lintel with initials and the date. Above the blocked doorway is a single light window with a double-chamfered surround, and the other windows in the house and the cottage are sashes.
Highfield House and wall 54.07583°N 1.60345°W	—	Mid 18th century	The house is in gritstone, with quoins, and a roof of stone slate and pantile with gable coping and cut-back kneelers. There are two storeys and two bays, with a lower bay to the right. The central doorway has a quoined surround, and the windows are casements with chamfered mullions and some mullions removed. The garden wall is coped and about 1.5 metres (4 ft 11 in) high, ramped up towards the house.
Former Nelson Arms and outbuilding 54.05743°N 1.60974°W		Mid 18th century	The public house, later a private house, is in gritstone, and has a roof with gable copings and kneelers. There are two storeys and three bays. In the centre is a doorway with an architrave and a cornice, flanked by canted bay windows The windows are horizontally-sliding sashes. The former stable range to the left is lower, with two storeys and three bays.
Tower of Thornton Church; 54.07250°N 1.59617°W		18th century	The body of the church has been demolished, leaving the tower. This is in gritstone, and has three stages and diagonal buttresses. In the lower stages are single-light windows, the bell openings have paired lights, and all have pointed hood moulds. At the top is an eaves cornice and an embattled parapet.
West Hill Cottages; 54.06465°N 1.60251°W	—	Mid 18th century	A house divided into three cottages, in gritstone, with quoins, and a Westmorland slate roof with gable coping and shaped kneelers. There are two storeys, a main range of two bays, and a lower two-bay extension on the right. In the centre is a blocked doorway with an alternate quoined surround. The windows are mixed; in the main range are mullioned and sash windows, and in the extension are casements.
Bowes Green Farmhouse; 54.06829°N 1.61544°W		Mid to late 18th century	The house, which contains some 17th-century material, is in gritstone, and has a Westmorland slate with gable copings. There are two storeys and two bays, and a single bay to the right. In the centre is a doorway with a fanlight, and the windows are sashes.
Low Hollins; 54.06481°N 1.62412°W		Late 18th century	The house is in gritstone and has a stone slate roof with gable copings. There are two storeys, three bays and a rear outshut. In the centre is a gabled stone porch, and the windows are sashes.
Woodfield Mill; 54.06605°N 1.64123°W		Late 18th century	The former watermill, which was rebuilt in 1831, is in gritstone with a stone slate roof. The main block has three storeys and four bays, and the wheelhouse attached to the right has two storeys. The openings include various doorways and windows, and in the wheelhouse is a round-arched opening with voussoirs.
St Joseph's Church and presbytery 54.06552°N 1.60319°W	—	1790	The older part is the presbytery, the church being built in 1809, and both are in gritstone with tile roofs. The presbytery has two storeys and attics, and three bays, a central porch and mullioned windows. The church to the right has four bays, round-headed windows, a porch at the east end, and a gable cross.
Covered water tank west of Low Kettlespring Farmhouse; 54.05675°N 1.59050°W		Late 18th to early 19th century (probable)	The water tank is in gritstone with quoins and a corrugated asbestos roof. It is a rectangular building with a single storey, partly built into a hillside. In the east gable end is a small segmental-arched doorway and a rectangular opening above. Inside, it is divided into two halves by a two-bay arcade of segmental arches on Tuscan columns.
Well head west of Kettlespring Farmhouse; 54.05769°N 1.59125°W	—	Late 18th to early 19th century (probable)	The well head is in coped gritstone. It consists of a low domed building with a gable on the south side and a segmental-arched doorway, and is about 60 centimetres (24 in) high.
Mill Cottages; 54.05721°N 1.61099°W	—	Late 18th to early 19th century	A pair of former workers' cottages in gritstone, with a stone slate roof, two storeys and two bays. Each cottage has a central doorway, and the windows are replacements.
