= Bishop Thornton =

Village in North Yorkshire, England

Coordinates: 54°03′54″N 1°36′08″W

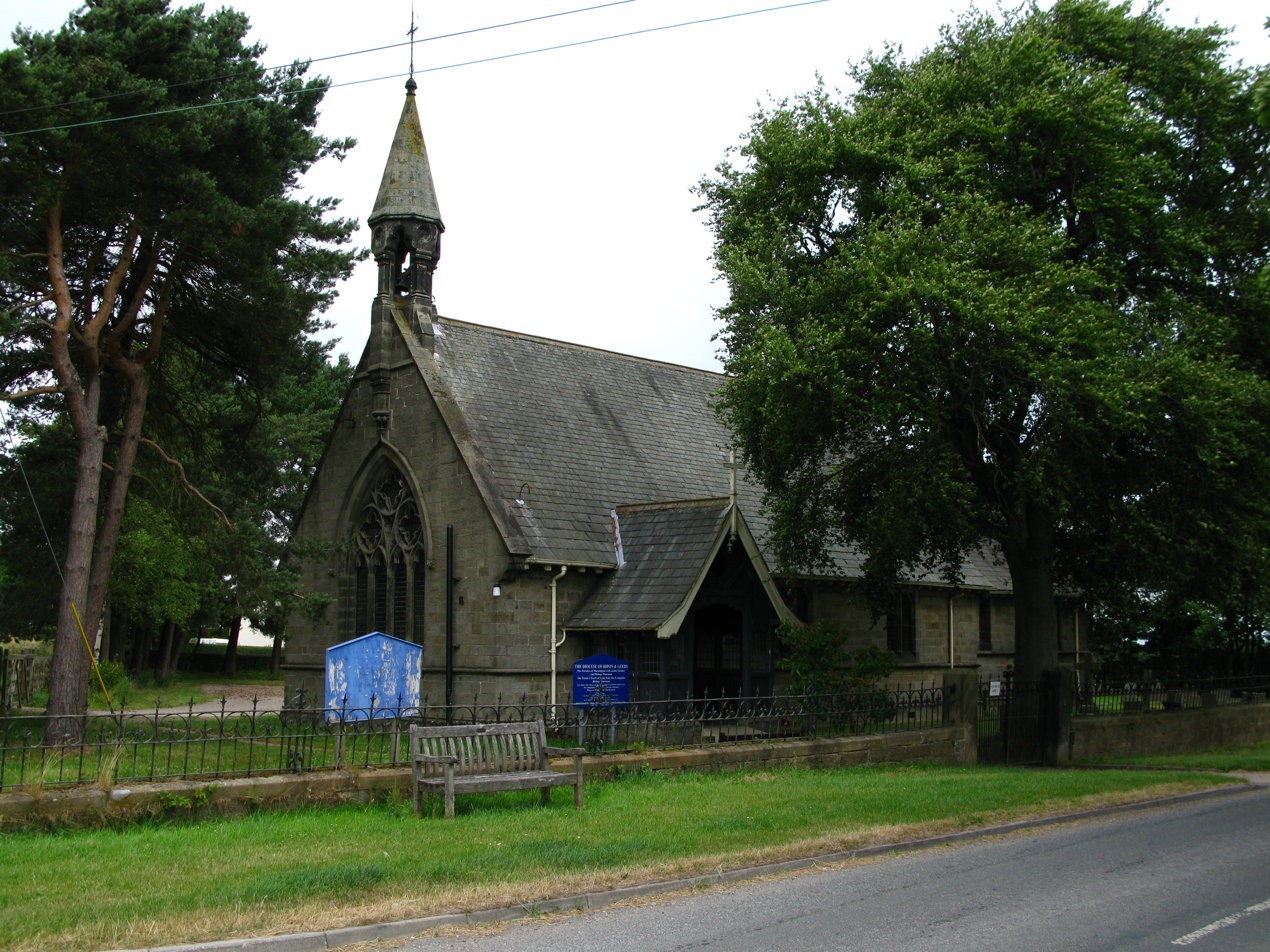
- Bishop Thornton Church

- Location within North Yorkshire
- Population: 507
- OS grid reference: SE260634
- Civil parish: Bishop Thornton
- Unitary authority: North Yorkshire
- Ceremonial county: North Yorkshire
- Region: Yorkshire and the Humber
- Country: England
- Sovereign state: United Kingdom
- Post town: HARROGATE
- Postcode district: HG3
- Police: North Yorkshire
- Fire: North Yorkshire
- Ambulance: Yorkshire
- UK Parliament: Skipton and Ripon

Bishop Thornton is a village and civil parish in North Yorkshire, England.

The civil parish also includes the village of Shaw Mills. According to the 2001 census the parish had a population of 521, decreasing to 507 at the 2011 census. The village is about seven miles north of Harrogate.

Bishop Thornton has both the Anglican St John's Church and the Catholic St Joseph's Church, the latter being the oldest in the Diocese of Leeds. The village also has two schools.

The civil parish shares a grouped parish council with Warsill. The parish council was originally known as Bishop Thornton and Warsill Parish Council, but in 2019 its name was changed to Bishop Thornton, Shaw Mills and Warsill Parish Council. The name change did not affect the names of the two constituent parishes.

The village was historically part of the West Riding of Yorkshire until 1974. From 1974 to 2023 it was part of the Borough of Harrogate, it is now administered by the unitary North Yorkshire Council.

== Village history ==
=== Anglo-Saxon/Norman Period (c. AD 500–1100) ===
The village was established during the Anglo-Saxon era. Its name derives from the Old English þorn (hawthorn tree) and tūn (enclosure/farmstead). The settlement was small at the time of the Domesday Book in 1086, where it was listed simply as a "settlement" or Thornton, with a recorded population of only a few households. The region was likely impacted by the widespread devastation of the Norman Conquest's Harrying of the North but the village persisted.

=== The Middle Ages (c. 1100–1485) ===
From 1279 to 1311, the Manor of Thornton belonged to Anthony le Bek, the powerful Prince Bishop of Durham and a high-ranking courtier. This ownership is where the "Bishop" prefix in the village name originates. The community belonged to the large parish of Ripon Minster (now Ripon Cathedral), but a local "chapel of ease" was built for convenience, with references to it existing as early as 1440.

=== The Tudor Period (c. 1485–1603) ===
The Reformation under Henry VIII and the establishment of the Church of England in 1534 had a profound impact. Yorkshire, particularly this area, had strong Catholic leanings. The village remained a centre for Catholicism.

=== The English Civil War (mid-1600s) ===
While the immediate area did not see major battles during the First English Civil War (1642–1646), the conflict had local consequences. A nearby vicar and several leading local men in another Thornton were recorded as Royalists, fined, and closely watched by Parliamentarians.

=== Modern Era ===
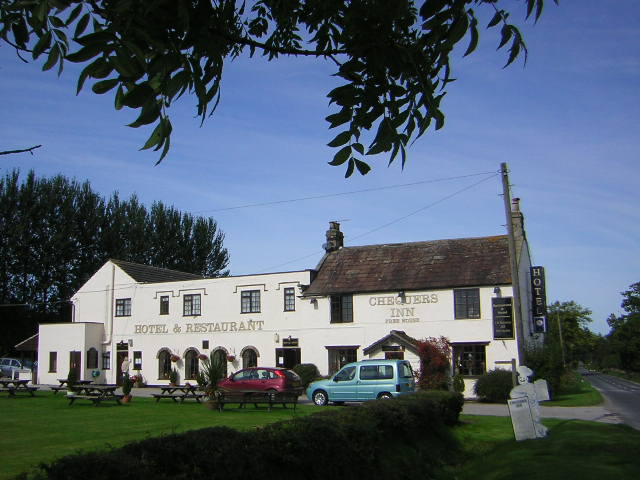
The Chequers Inn, Bishop Thornton

In later centuries, the village evolved through agricultural changes (the enclosure of common land in the 18th century) and industrial activity, such as a local paper mill that ran for much of the 20th century, employing many villagers until its closure in 1976.

== See also ==
- Listed buildings in Bishop Thornton, Shaw Mills and Warsill
