= Burnt Yates =

Village in North Yorkshire, England

Coordinates: 54°02′45″N 1°37′02″W

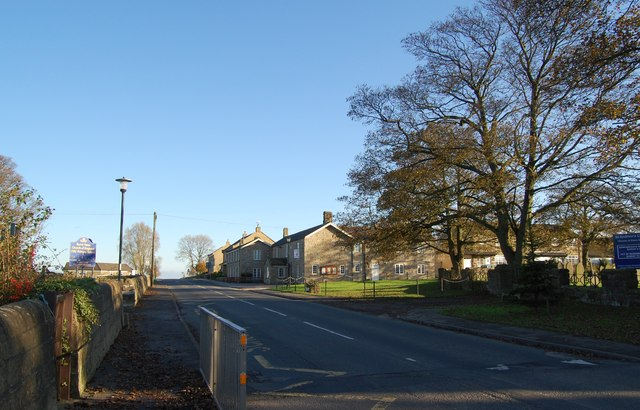
- Houses along the main street

- Location within North Yorkshire
- OS grid reference: SE251611
  - London: 180 mi (290 km) SSE
- Civil parish: Clint cum Hamlets
- Unitary authority: North Yorkshire
- Ceremonial county: North Yorkshire
- Region: Yorkshire and the Humber
- Country: England
- Sovereign state: United Kingdom
- Post town: HARROGATE
- Postcode district: HG3
- Dialling code: 01423
- Police: North Yorkshire
- Fire: North Yorkshire
- Ambulance: Yorkshire
- UK Parliament: Skipton and Ripon

Burnt Yates is a village in the county of North Yorkshire, England.

== Community ==
The village name possibly derived from 'Burnt Gates', based on a belief that nearby gates were burnt.

Burnt Yates is part of the civil parish of Clint cum Hamlets. The village is 1 mile (1.6 km) north of the River Nidd and approximately 10 miles (16 km) east of the Yorkshire Dales National Park, and contains approximately fifty houses. From 1974 to 2023 it was part of the Borough of Harrogate, it is now administered by the unitary North Yorkshire Council. It is in the UK Parliament Constituency of Skipton and Ripon.

St Andrew's Church, Burnt Yates was built in 1883. The village school was Burnt Yates CE Primary School which Ofsted rated as 'Outstanding' in 2006–07, and 'Good' in 2011. Forty-two children attended at the time. The school was required to become an academy following an 'Inadequate' rating in 2016, and in 2018, it was closed due to dwindling pupil numbers. However, in 2019, the school buildings were reopened as Admiral Long C.E. Primary School, as a local school (Bishop Thornton C of E School) needed to move to larger premises.

=== Transport ===
The main road through Burnt Yates is the B6165, which is the primary road route from Knaresborough to Glasshouses, North Yorkshire. A bus service between Pateley Bridge and Ripon passes through the village.

== See also ==
- Listed buildings in Clint cum Hamlets
