= HG postcode area =

Postcode area within the United Kingdom

Harrogate
- Postcode area
- Coordinates: 54.042°N 1.552°W
- Country: United Kingdom
- Postcode area: HG
- Postcode area name: Harrogate
- Post towns: 3
- Postcode districts: 5
- Postcode sectors: 25
- Postcodes (live): 4,409
- Postcodes (total): 6,317
- Statistics as at May 2020

The HG postcode area, also known as the Harrogate postcode area, is a group of five postcode districts in England, within three post towns. These postcode districts cover Harrogate, Ripon and Knaresborough in North Yorkshire.

HG1 and HG2 cover most of the urban area of Harrogate. HG1 covers areas north of The Stray including the town centre, while HG2 covers areas to the south and west of The Stray. East of The Stray, HG1 generally covers areas to the north of the A59 Knaresborough Road, while HG2 covers areas to the south. HG3 spans across some of the town's westernmost suburbs, some settlements immediately to the south, as well as a large rural area to the north and west. HG4 covers Ripon and some surrounding settlements and rural areas. HG5 covers Knaresborough and some rural areas to the north and east.

It is the only postcode area located entirely within North Yorkshire, and when ranked by number of postcode districts it is the second smallest postcode area in the United Kingdom, behind only the ZE postcode area which has three districts. However, many postcode areas with a greater number of districts cover fewer square miles in total.

Mail for the HG postcode area is processed at Leeds Mail Centre, along with mail for the BD, HD, HX, LS, WF and YO postcode areas.

== Coverage ==
The approximate coverage of the postcode districts:

Postcode district	Post town	Coverage	Local authority area(s)
HG1	HARROGATE	Central, Bilton, High Harrogate, Jennyfields, Duchy, New Park	North Yorkshire
HG2	HARROGATE	Oatlands, Woodlands, Hookstone, Rossett, Pannal Ash, Harlow Hill, Low Harrogate, Hornbeam Park	North Yorkshire
HG3	HARROGATE	Jennyfields, Pannal, Barrowby, Burn Bridge, Kirkby Overblow, Killinghall, Greenhow, Fewston, Beckwithshaw, Spofforth, Bishop Monkton, Bishop Thornton, Glasshouses, Follifoot, Pateley Bridge, Summerbridge, Ripley, Brearton, Burton Leonard, Hampsthwaite, Nidd, South Stainley, Wormald Green, Markington, Burnt Yates, Bedlam, Shaw Mills, Birstwith, Warsill, Darley, Dacre, Wath-in-Nidderdale, Middlesmoor, Lofthouse, Ramsgill, Stean, Bewerley, Thornthwaite, Thruscross, West End	North Yorkshire
HG4	RIPON	Ripon, North Stainley, High Grantley, Masham, West Tanfield, Thornton Watlass, Thornton Steward, Sawley, Eavestone, Littlethorpe, Skelton-on-Ure, Marton-le-Moor, North Stainley, Wath, Nunwick, Melmerby, Middleton Quernhow, Bridge Hewick, Sharow, Copt Hewick, Hutton Conyers, Aldfield, Kirkby Malzeard, Leighton, Colsterdale, Gollinglith Foot, Azerley, Galphay, Winksley, Sutton Grange, Grewelthorpe, Rookwith, Low Ellington, Thirn	North Yorkshire
HG5	KNARESBOROUGH	Knaresborough, Scotton, Goldsborough, Arkendale, Allerton Mauleverer, Hopperton, Flaxby, Coneythorpe, Staveley, Ferrensby, Farnham, Calcutt, Plompton	North Yorkshire

== Map ==
HG postcode area map, showing postcode districts in red and post towns in grey text, with links to nearby BD, DL, LS and YO postcode areas.

== See also ==
- Postcode Address File
- List of postcode areas in the United Kingdom
