= Bewerley =

Village and civil parish in North Yorkshire, England

Coordinates: 54°04′48″N 1°45′41″W

- Location within North Yorkshire
- Population: 717 (2011 Census)
- OS grid reference: SE157648
- Civil parish: Bewerley
- Unitary authority: North Yorkshire
- Ceremonial county: North Yorkshire
- Region: Yorkshire and the Humber
- Country: England
- Sovereign state: United Kingdom
- Post town: HARROGATE
- Postcode district: HG3
- Police: North Yorkshire
- Fire: North Yorkshire
- Ambulance: Yorkshire

Bewerley is a village and civil parish in the county of North Yorkshire, England. The village is 0.5 mile south of Pateley Bridge in Nidderdale. The parish includes the part of the Pateley Bridge built-up area west of the River Nidd, where Pateley Bridge post office, the Nidderdale showground, Nidderdale High School and the district of Bridgehouse Gate are located. The parish also includes the village of Greenhow, 3 miles (5 km) west of Pateley Bridge. According to the 2001 census the parish had a population of 730, decreasing at the 2011 Census to 717.

From 1974 to 2023 it was part of the Borough of Harrogate, it is now administered by the unitary North Yorkshire Council.

== History ==
Bewerley is mentioned in the Domesday Book (as Burelei). Before the Norman Conquest it was part of the estates of Gospatric, Earl of Northumbria. After the conquest the estates passed to the Mowbray family and in 1175 Roger de Mowbray sold the Bewerley estate to Fountains Abbey, which established a grange at Bewerley. After the Dissolution the ownership of Bewerley was fragmented. In 1674 the manor of Bewerley, together with some land, was acquired by the Yorke family, which held it until 1924.

By the 19th century Bewerley was a township in the large parish of Ripon. It became a separate civil parish in 1866. During the early 20th century, when Elizabeth Wilhelmina Jones was headmistress of Harrogate Ladies' College, she maintained a house and garden in Bewerley.

== Buildings ==
Bewerley Hall was built in the 16th or 17th century. In 1774 it was acquired by the Yorke family, who built a new hall in 1815. The new hall was demolished in 1925, but Bewerley Old Hall survives.

Bewerley Park Centre for Outdoor Education is run by the North Yorkshire County Council.

Bewerley Grange Chapel was built by Marmaduke Huby, abbot of Fountains Abbey from 1495 to 1526. After the Dissolution the chapel was used as a dwelling house, and from 1678 to 1831 as a school. In 1965 it was restored and returned to use as a chapel.

== See also ==
- Listed buildings in Bewerley

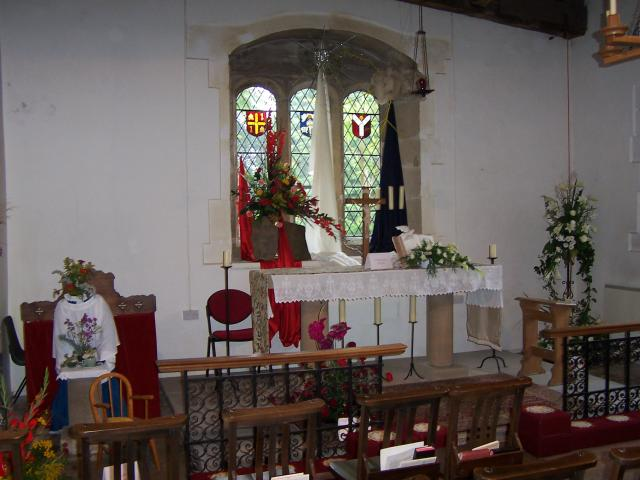
Interior of Bewerley Grange Chapel
