= Henry Simpson's Barn =

Building in Appletreewick, North Yorkshire, England

Coordinates: 54°02′51″N 1°53′43″W

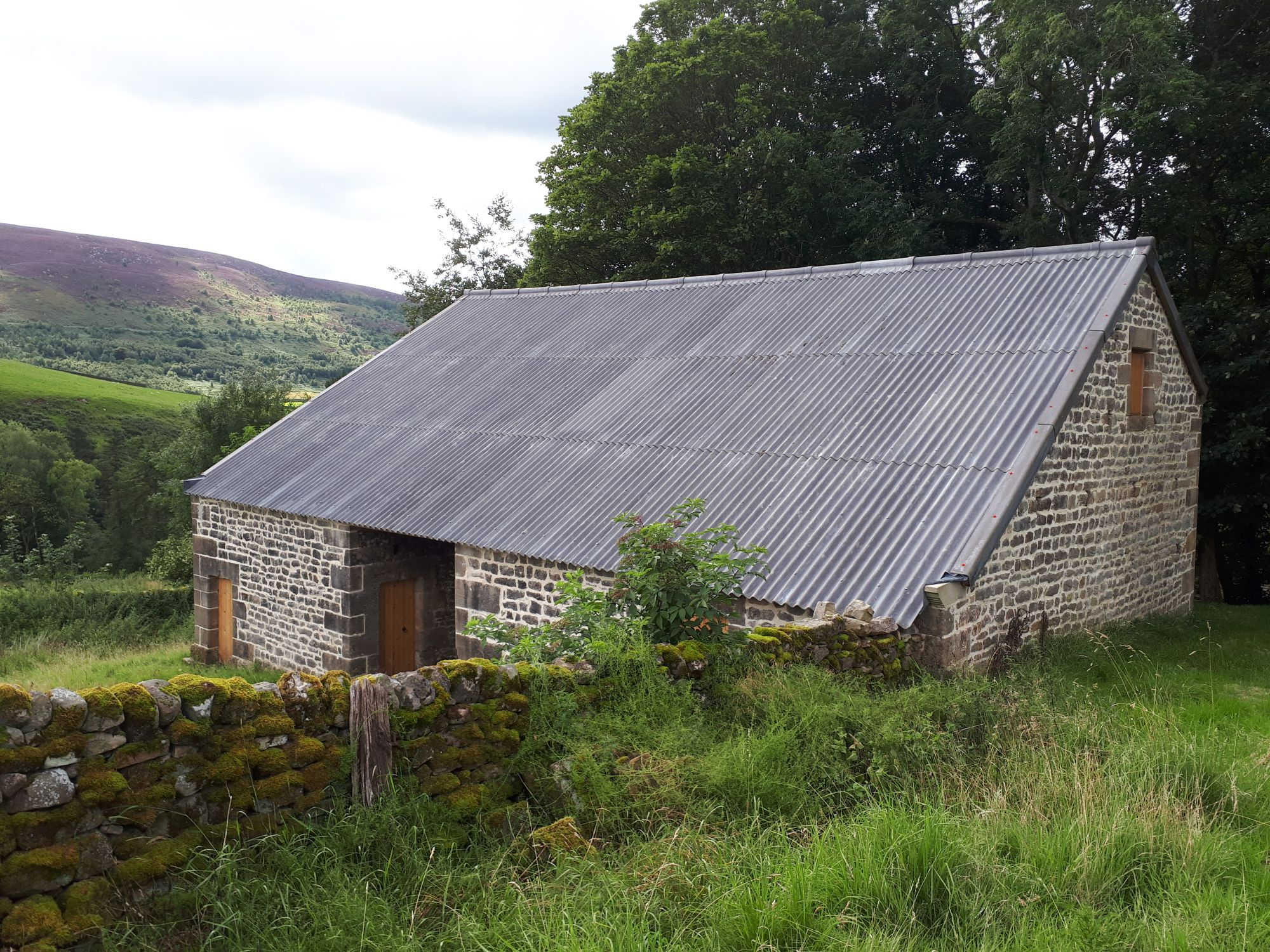
The building in 2023

Henry Simpson's Barn is a historic building in Appletreewick, a village in North Yorkshire in England.

The barn was constructed in 1737, on the estate of Richard Boyle, 3rd Earl of Burlington, near Parcevall Hall. The construction was organised by local agent William Taylor at a cost of £126 19s 5d. Taylor wrote to Boyle's national agent, Henry Simpson, "you'll doubtless think a large sum... however 'tis effectually done and is a very useful handsome and perhaps one of the best finished Barns in Craven". The barn was later divided into a cowhouse and a threshing barn, with some storerooms, and two haylofts above. In 1995, the barn was Grade II* listed, but its roof was partly removed, leading to its placement on the Heritage at Risk Register. In 2022, the barn was restored.

The barn is constructed of limestone with gritstone quoins, and a slate roof. It is four bays long, and has an aisle on the north-east side. The front has an off-centre cart entrance, with an inscription "Mr H S 1737" above. There are also ventilation holes above the entrance. The south-east side is gabled and has two entrances and a ventilation slit, while the north-west side has a pitching window into the former hayloft in the gable. The rear has a roofed porch leading to a further cart entrance, with the aisle extending either side. There are four doorways and a further ventilation slit. The roof has three trusses with king posts, a traditional structure but one unusual in the local area. Two of the timbers are reused from a cruck frame.

== See also ==
- Listed buildings in Appletreewick
