= Appletreewick =

Village and civil parish in North Yorkshire, England

Coordinates: 54°02′13″N 1°55′18″W

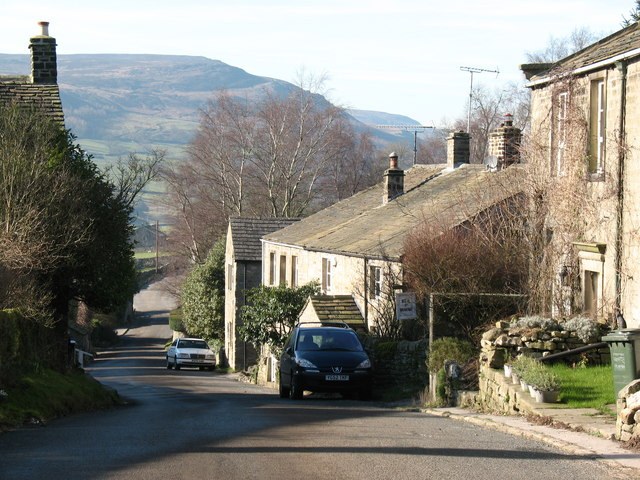
- Village street, Appletreewick

- Location within North Yorkshire
- Population: 218 (2011 census)
- OS grid reference: SE049601
  - London: 190 miles (306 km)
- Civil parish: Appletreewick
- Unitary authority: North Yorkshire
- Ceremonial county: North Yorkshire
- Region: Yorkshire and the Humber
- Country: England
- Sovereign state: United Kingdom
- Post town: SKIPTON
- Postcode district: BD23
- Dialling code: 01756
- Police: North Yorkshire
- Fire: North Yorkshire
- Ambulance: Yorkshire
- UK Parliament: Skipton and Ripon

Appletreewick (traditionally pronounced AP-trik, /ˈapˌtrɪk/) is a village and civil parish in the district and county of North Yorkshire, England, 7 miles (11 km) north-east of Skipton.

Appletreewick is in Wharfedale in the Yorkshire Dales, a popular place for visitors, especially in the summer months, on the banks of the River Wharfe.

The civil parish includes the hamlet of Skyreholme and the western end of the village of Greenhow. The parish also includes Parcevall Hall, Stump Cross Caverns, the eastern part of Grimwith Reservoir and extensive areas of moorland north and east of the village. Barden Fell is a grouse moor belonging to the Bolton Abbey Estate, and Simon's Seat is a prominent rock outcrop to the north of Barden Fell. The civil parish had a population of 218 at the 2011 Census.

Until 1974 it was part of the West Riding of Yorkshire. From 1974 to 2023 it was part of the Craven District, it is now administered by the unitary North Yorkshire Council.

== History ==
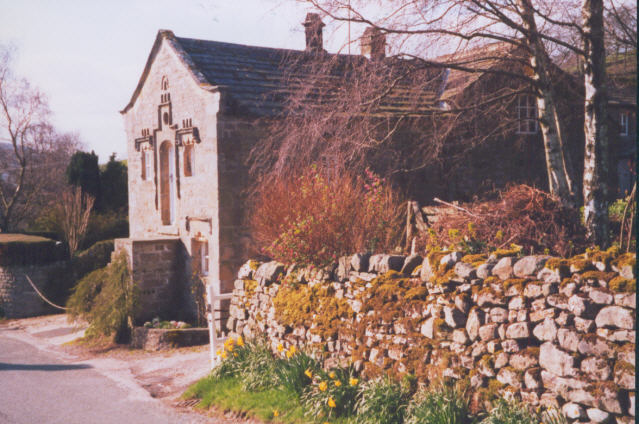
Mock Beggar Hall in Appletreewick

The village is mentioned in the Domesday Book of 1086, and its name is derived from the Old English of æppel-trēow wīc, which means the Apple-tree specialised farm (or hamlet). The old dialectal pronunciation of the village name is a shortened 'Ap-trick', which is sometimes still heard being used by the locals.

The village prospered from the year 1300 when Bolton Priory acquired its manor with its extensive sheep ranges and valuable lead mines. Charters for markets and a fair were granted and the latter remained important until the impact of the railways in the mid-19th century. The Ap-trick Onion Fair celebrated all manner of things, but given its name, it was chiefly remembered for being an avenue to sell lots of onions that were brought into the village especially for the fair. Records show that fight broke out between the Lord Clifford's of Skipton Castle and the Nortons of Rylstone Manor. This reinforces the belief that Appletreewick was more important than Burnsall at that time, as both noble families were in attendance.

Stone houses line the steep, main street between High Hall at the top and Low Hall at the bottom. The Tudor-style grade II* listed High Hall was restored by Sir William Craven (known as Appletreewick's own "Dick Whittington") who became Sheriff and Lord Mayor of London at the beginning of the 17th century. Craven was born in a cottage almost opposite High Hall, one of a pair converted into St John the Baptist's Church. Lower down is Monks Hall, largely rebuilt in 1697 on the site of Bolton Priory's grange. The pub, the Craven Arms, was also owned by William and has much of the village history on display including a fully heather-thatched cruck barn to look round. The cruck barn was the first one to be built in Upper Wharfedale in over 300 years and used original materials such as lime and horsehair to line the walls and sheep's wool for insulation.

A 2009 study of rural driving within England led to Appletreewick attaining the title of 'Britain's Friendliest Town to Drive Through'. The study was based upon data collected around Britain, monitoring levels of road rage, driver communication, average speeds and hand wave acknowledgments of friendly driving.

== See also ==
- Listed buildings in Appletreewick
