= Nidderdale High School =

Coordinates: 54°05′22.0″N 1°46′18.6″W

Location
- Low Wath Road; Pateley Bridge; North Yorkshire, HG3 5HL; England

Information
- Type: Academy
- Local authority: North Yorkshire Council
- Trust: Moorlands Learning Trust
- Department for Education URN: 149987 Tables
- Ofsted: Reports
- Headteacher: Kath Jordan
- Gender: Coeducational
- Age: 11 to 16
- Enrolment: 393 as of August 2023
- Website: http://nidderdale.n-yorks.sch.uk/

Nidderdale High School is a coeducational secondary school located in Pateley Bridge, North Yorkshire, England. The school is named after Nidderdale, one of the Yorkshire Dales in which the school is located.

The school is part of the Red Kite Alliance – a partnership of schools and universities in Yorkshire focused on providing school-to-school support and training new teachers. Nidderdale High School offers GCSEs and BTECs as programmes of study for pupils.

== History ==
In July 2017, a group of children from the school were runners-up in the Project Reinvent Challenge, sponsored by Drax Power and won a share of the £10 000 prize for their design for a new climbing wall.

In December 2017, the school received media attention after part-time art teacher Bridget Adams won The Royal Glasgow Institute of the Fine Arts Award for her artwork Organised Kindness.

In September 2020, the school won the National Association of Pastoral Care in Education Pastoral Development of the Year Award for its Harmony Project.

Previously a community school administered by North Yorkshire Council, in September 2023 Nidderdale High School converted to academy status. The school is now sponsored by the Moorlands Learning Trust.
