= Trollers Gill =

Limestone gorge in North Yorkshire, England

Coordinates: 54.05301°N 1.89762°W

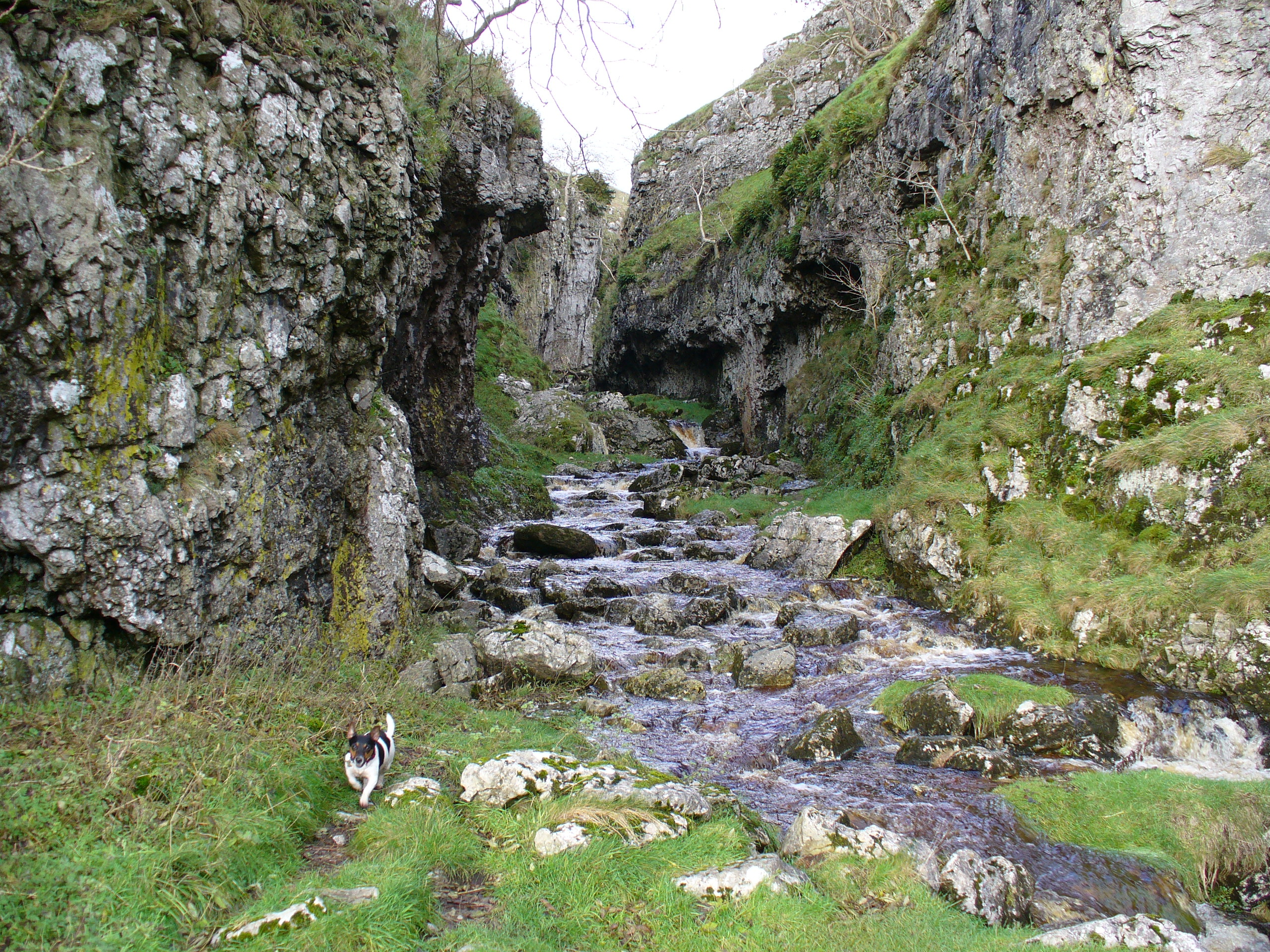
Troller's Gill

Trollers Gill is a limestone gill or gorge in North Yorkshire, England, close to the village of Skyreholme and 4.7 miles (7.5 km) south-east of Grassington in the Yorkshire Dales (grid reference SE068619). The gorge, which is 0.5 miles (0.8 km) in length, is also known as Trollerdale.

== Name ==
The name Trollers is from troll and ears 'arse', so the gill means "the troll's arse", presumably after the supposed existence of trolls here. Arse is commonly used for a buttock-shaped hill. The present name was first recorded only in 1812. A survey conducted in the reign of Edward II listed the gorge as Gordale in Appletreewick. Speight suggests that this is of Danish influence from the word geir; a triangular piece of land that ends in a chasm.

== Description ==
Skyreholme Beck flows through the gorge, but for most of the year the streambed is dry with the water flowing underground. The beck is the continuation of Dry Gill, an intermittent stream which emerges from the Stump Cross Caverns system 1.4 miles (2.3 km) north-east of the head of Trollers Gill.

There are several caves in the gorge. The largest is a pothole known as Hell Hole, which is 55 metres deep and has 210 metres of passages. The cave was first explored in 1896. The gill is also the location of an old lead and later fluorspar mine which was last worked in the 1960s.

== Legends ==
Legend has it that the gill is the home of the mythical monstrous black dog Barghest who can turn one to stone with a look. It has also been suggested by some that the Barghest story was a major influence on Sir Arthur Conan Doyle when he was penning The Hound of the Baskervilles.

Local folklore declared that trolls lived in the gorge (hence its name) and would push stones down from the deep sides to people travelling up and down the gorge.

Roger and the Rottentrolls is a fictional children's television program which takes the name of its setting from Trollers Gill; however, filming took place at Brimham Rocks, a short distance away.

== Gallery ==
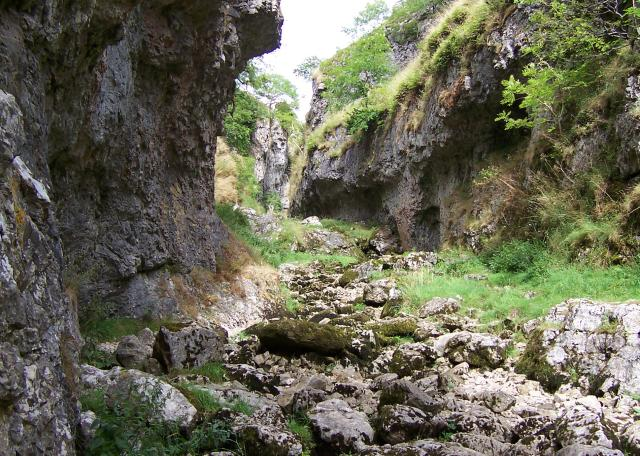
Entrance to Trollers Gill dry

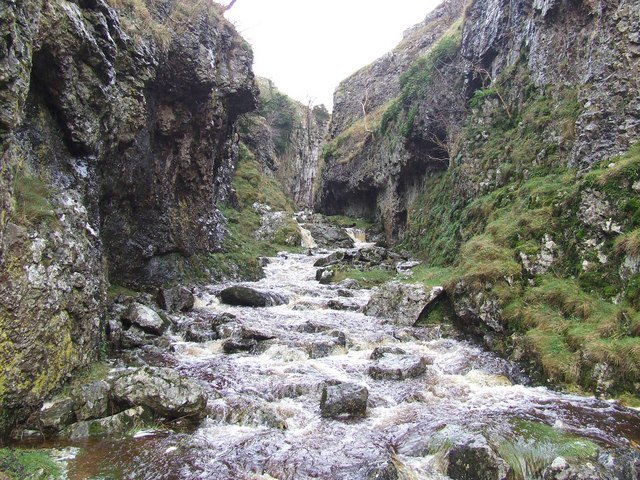
Entrance to Trollers Gill in spate
