= Listed buildings in Appletreewick =

Appletreewick is a civil parish in the county of North Yorkshire, England. It contains 27 listed buildings that are recorded in the National Heritage List for England. Of these, three are listed at Grade II*, the middle of the three grades, and the others are at Grade II, the lowest grade. The parish contains the village of Appletreewick, the smaller settlement of Skyreholme, and the surrounding countryside. Most of the listed buildings consist of houses, cottages and associated structures, farmhouses and farm buildings. The others include a church, a chapel and a bridge.

== Key ==
Grade	Criteria
II*	Particularly important buildings of more than special interest
II	Buildings of national importance and special interest

== Buildings ==
Name and location	Photograph	Date	Notes	Grade
Grimwith High Laithe; 54.07531°N 1.89114°W		16th century	A field barn in stone, with a heather thatched roof, a single storey and two bays. It contains a doorway, and inside is a cruck truss, a flagged floor and three wooden cattle stalls.	II
High Hall; 54.03677°N 1.91847°W		16th century	A stone house on a chamfered plinth, with quoins, and a stone slate roof with moulded coped gables, and shaped kneelers. There are three storeys and a basement, and three bays. In the centre is a gabled porch with a round-headed doorway and moulded impost bands, and an inner doorway with a three-centred arched head and a chamfered surround. The windows are mullioned or mullioned and transomed, some with hood moulds. In the left return is a doorway with a chamfered surround and a segmental-arched head, and in the right return is a small gabled porch with finials. Inside, there is a large stone inglenook.	II*
Parcevall Hall; 54.04715°N 1.89629°W		16th century	A house that was later extended and used for other purposes, it is in stone with a stone slate roof. There are two storeys, the earlier part has six bays, to its right is a later five-bay extension, and at the rear are two long wings added in 1929. The left bay of the earlier part is recessed and gabled, with stone coping and shaped kneelers. In the centre is a flat-headed porch with two ball finials, containing a doorway with a chamfered surround, and the windows are chamfered, most with mullions and some with hood moulds. The extensions are in a similar style.	II*
The Old Post Office; 54.03684°N 1.91956°W		16th century	The house is in stone with a stone slate roof. There are two storeys, two bays, and a three-bay wing at right angles on the left. The doorway has a chamfered surround and a three-centred arched head, and to its left is a window, both under a continuous hood mould. Most of the windows are chamfered and mullioned.	II
Woodhouse Farmhouse; 54.04137°N 1.94073°W		16th century	A stone farmhouse with a stone slate roof, two storeys and four bays, the second bay projecting. On the front is a doorway with a chamfered surround and a four-centred arch, and chamfered mullioned windows with hood moulds.	II
Appletree House; 54.03681°N 1.92034°W	—	17th century	The house is in stone, and has a stone slate roof with stone coping and shaped kneelers. There are two storeys and irregular fenestration, including casement windows, one with a chamfered surround, and two chamfered mullioned windows. The doorway has a chamfered surround and a segmental head.	II
Barn south of Lowfold Farmhouse; 54.03681°N 1.92625°W	—	17th century	Originally a farmhouse, the barn is in stone, with quoins and a stone slate roof. There are two storeys and two bays. In the centre is a doorway with a chamfered surround and a basket-arched head. The windows are double-chamfered and mullioned, and on the front of the barn is a buttress.	II
Laburnam Farmhouse; 54.03715°N 1.91810°W		17th century	The farmhouse is in stone, with quoins, and a stone slate roof with stone coping and shaped kneelers. There are two storeys and five bays. On the front are two doorways, one with a cornice, and the other with a three-centred arched head. The windows are a mix, and include chamfered mullioned windows, tripartite windows, and casements. Inside, there is a large inglenook fireplace.	II
Lane House Farmhouse; 54.03971°N 1.90041°W		17th century	A stone farmhouse with quoins, and a stone slate roof with moulded stone copings and shaped kneelers. There are two storeys and four bays, the left two bays projecting. The doorway has a plain surround and the windows are chamfered and mullioned, some with hood moulds. On the right are external steps leading to an upper floor doorway.	II
Low Hall Farmhouse; 54.03771°N 1.92654°W		17th century	The farmhouse is in stone, and has a stone slate roof with stone coping and shaped kneelers with ball finials. There are two storeys and five bays, the right bay projecting and forming a gabled wing with a finial. The porch has a doorway with a four-centred arched head, a cornice, a hood mould and an embattled parapet. The windows are mullioned or mullioned and transomed with hood moulds.	II
Barn southwest of Low Hall; 54.03758°N 1.92736°W	—	17th century	The barn is in stone and has a stone slate roof with stone coping and shaped kneelers. In the centre is a wagon entrance with a chamfered surround and a segmental head, and there are remnants of other chamfered openings.	II
St John the Baptist's Church; 54.03706°N 1.91837°W		17th century	The church was converted from two cottages in 1898, and is built in stone with a stone slate roof. There is a single storey and four bays, and it consists of a single cell. The doorway has a chamfered surround and a four-centred arched head, and the windows are mullioned.	II
Barn east of High Hall; 54.03680°N 1.91795°W	—	1655	The barn is in stone and has a stone slate roof with moulded stone coping and shaped kneelers. There are two storeys and two bays, and a later outshut to the left. In the centre is a wagon entrance with quoined jambs, and a chamfered segmental arch with voussoirs, above which is an initialled datestone. The windows are chamfered and mullioned with two lights.	II
Prospect House; 54.03680°N 1.91891°W		1665	The house is in stone, and has a stone slate roof with stone coping and shaped kneelers. There are two storeys and five bays. The doorway has a plain surround, and is flanked by three-light double-chamfered mullioned windows, all under a continuous hood mould. To the left is a blocked doorway containing a sash window with a dated and initialled segmental head. In the upper floor are a semicircular-headed window and a small circular window, and the other windows are mullioned.	II
Great Barn west of Low Hall; 54.03770°N 1.92706°W		1690	The barn is in stone with a stone slate roof and a single storey. In the centre is a wagon doorway with a chamfered surround, a segmental head, and moulded imposts. There are other doorways, two with stepped chamfered lintels, and another with an initialled and dated lintel and a hood mould. Also on the front are vents and casement windows with chamfered surrounds.	II
Mock Beggar Hall; 54.03704°N 1.92035°W		1696	The house has been altered and extended through the centuries, and is in stone with a stone slate roof. There are two storeys, a left wing of two bays, a central range of two bays, a projecting gabled two-bay wing on the right, and a rear wing. In the central range is a doorway with a segmental head, above which is a hood mould with a semicircular pediment containing a mask and the date, to the right is a small square window, and recessed further to the right is a garage opening with a segmental head. The left wing has quoins, tripartite windows, and stone coped gables with shaped kneelers. The right wing has external steps leading to an upper floor segmental-headed doorway with a moulded chamfered surround, above which is a circular window and round-arched pigeon holes. This is flanked by windows, each with a lintel decorated with semicircles, a hood mould, and three round-arched pigeon holes.	II
Barn northeast of Lowfold Farmhouse; 54.03710°N 1.92609°W	—	Early 18th century	The barn is in stone, and has a stone slate roof with moulded stone coping and shaped kneelers. In the centre is a doorway recessed in a segmental arch with voussoirs. To the right is a doorway with a moulded lintel and an outshut. In the left return is a doorway with a chamfered decorated lintel, and square vents.	II
Henry Simpson's Barn; 54.04756°N 1.89532°W		1737	The barn, to the northeast of Parcevall Hall, is in limestone, with gritstone quoins, and partly roofed in stone slate with moulded kneelers. There are four bays, and an aisle at the rear. In the southeast front is a cart entrance with chamfered jambs and a segmental arch formed by voussoirs, above which is a dated and initialled plaque. In the southwest gable end are two doorways with chamfered jambs and monolithic lintels with ogee hoods. At the rear is a recessed cart entrance and doorways, and in all these fronts are vents. The northwest gable contains a pitching hole with a chamfered surround.	II*
Ridge End House; 54.04496°N 1.89674°W		1747	The house is in stone with quoins, and a stone slate roof with stone coping and shaped kneelers. There are two storeys, and four bays. The main doorway has a lintel with rounded webs in the corners, and above it is an initialled and dated stone. To the left is a doorway with a plain surround, and the windows are mullioned with two lights.	II
Craven Cottage, Hilltop Cottage and Hillside Cottage; 54.03704°N 1.91892°W		18th century	A row of three cottages in stone, with a stone slate roof, stone copings and shaped kneelers. There are two storeys, the left two cottages have two bays each, and the right, lower, cottage has a single bay. In the second and fourth bays are doorways with plain surrounds, moulded friezes and cornices, and to the right of the fourth bay is a passage entry. The windows are a mix of casements and sashes, and in the right cottage is a mullioned window.	II
Inmans Farmhouse and barn 54.04353°N 1.88724°W		18th century	The farmhouse and attached barn are in stone, with modillions, and a stone slate roof with stone coping and shaped kneelers. The house has two storeys and three bays. In the centre is a doorway with a plain surround and a cornice. Above the doorway is a round-headed blind window, and the other windows are tripartite. The barn to the right has a large central wagon entrance with a segmental arch.	II
Simons Seat Farmhouse; 54.04336°N 1.89048°W		18th century	The farmhouse is in stone with quoins, moulded modillions, and a stone slate roof with stone coping and shaped kneelers. There are two storeys and four bays. On the front are three doorways, one with a stone panel above, and the windows are mullioned with three or four lights. Inside, there is a large inglenook fireplace.	II
Fell Cottage; 54.03687°N 1.91920°W		Late 18th century	The house is in rendered stone, with modillion eaves and a stone slate roof. There are two storeys and two bays. The central doorway has a plain surround, and the windows are two-light casements, each with a mullion.	II
Hartlington Bridge; 54.04439°N 1.94032°W		Late 18th to early 19th century	The bridge carries a road over Barben Beck. It is in stone, and consists of a single segmental arch with voussoirs, two flat buttresses, a band and a coped parapet.	II
Smithy Cottage; 54.03703°N 1.91938°W	—	1810	The cottage is in rendered stone, with a stone slate roof. There are two storeys and four bays. On the front is a gabled porch, the windows are casements, and all the openings have plain surrounds. In the left bay is an inscribed and dated tablet.	II
Glaholm; 54.03685°N 1.91982°W		Early 19th century	The house is in stone, with quoins, plain modillions and a stone slate roof. There are two storeys and three bays. In the centre is a gabled porch, and the windows are sashes with plain surrounds.	II
Methodist Chapel with cottage 54.03018°N 1.90917°W		1836	A chapel with a cottage below, it is in stone, with modillions, and a stone slate roof with stone coping and shaped kneelers. There are two storeys and two bays. On the front is a central doorway flanked by sash windows, and round-headed windows in the upper floor. The right return contains two doorways, and in the upper floor are round-headed windows with an inscribed and dated plaque between them.	II
