= Pateley Bridge (bridge) =

Road bridge in North Yorkshire, England

Coordinates: 54°05′08″N 1°45′40″W

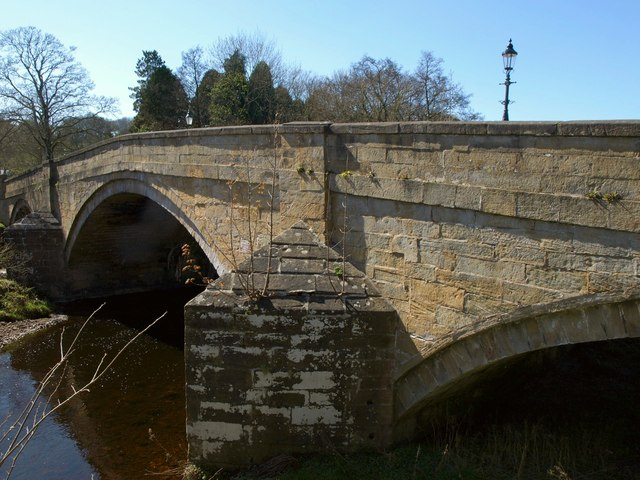
The bridge, in 2012

Pateley Bridge is a historic bridge across the River Nidd in North Yorkshire, in England.

The bridge connects the town of Pateley Bridge with the village of Bewerley and carries the B6265 road. There was a ford at the site in the early mediaeval period, but by 12th century there was a wooden bridge. John Leland described a wooden bridge here in the 16th century. By 1647, it appears to have been rebuilt in stone, and the bridge was repaired and partially rebuilt on several occasions. The current structure dates from the late 18th century, and was grade II listed in 1967.

The bridge is built of stone and consists of three segmental arches, two over the river. The bridge has pointed cutwaters that rise as pilaster buttresses with flat coping, recessed voussoirs, and a raised band at road level.

== See also ==
- Listed buildings in High and Low Bishopside
