= Nidderdale Museum =

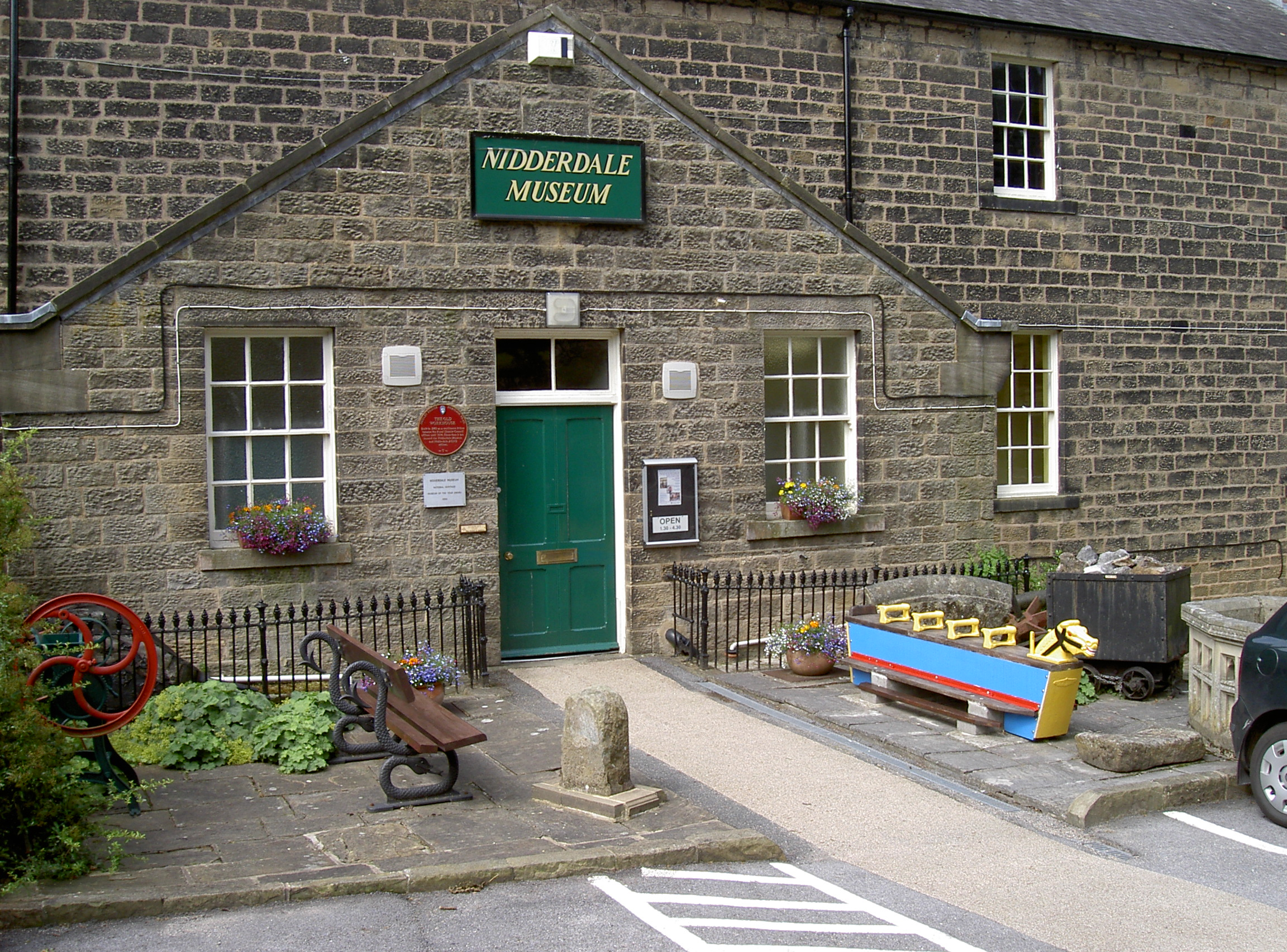

- Location within North Yorkshire
- Established: 1975
- Location: Pateley Bridge, North Yorkshire, England
- Coordinates: 54.08787°N 1.75930°W
- Type: Local history museum
- Visitors: 7,000
- Website: Official website

Nidderdale Museum is a local and social history museum in the market town of Pateley Bridge in Nidderdale, one of the Yorkshire Dales, in North Yorkshire, England. The museum is housed in a former workhouse, and is normally open every week from Tuesday to Sunday 1.30 p.m. to 4.30 p.m. from Easter (or 1 April) to 31 October, and only open on Saturdays and Sundays from 1.30 p.m. to 4.30 p.m. over the winter months, from November to March. The Museum is closed on a Monday. There is a small entry charge for adults. Accompanied children under 16 are free.

The museum is run by volunteers. The Nidderdale Museum Society has two hundred members, with an elected Committee, and a Board of Trustees.

== Exhibits ==
The exhibits focus on rural life, with sections devoted to agriculture, local industries, religion, transport and costume, set out across 11 rooms. Displays include re-creations of a Victorian schoolroom, a cobbler's workshop, a lead mining tunnel, a Victorian parlour, general store, a 1930s hairdresser's shop and a kitchen. Other displays include historic costumes, agriculture tools and equipment, local industries and transport vehicles.

The museum also has a reference library of books relating to the local history and life of Nidderdale, and materials for local and family history research.

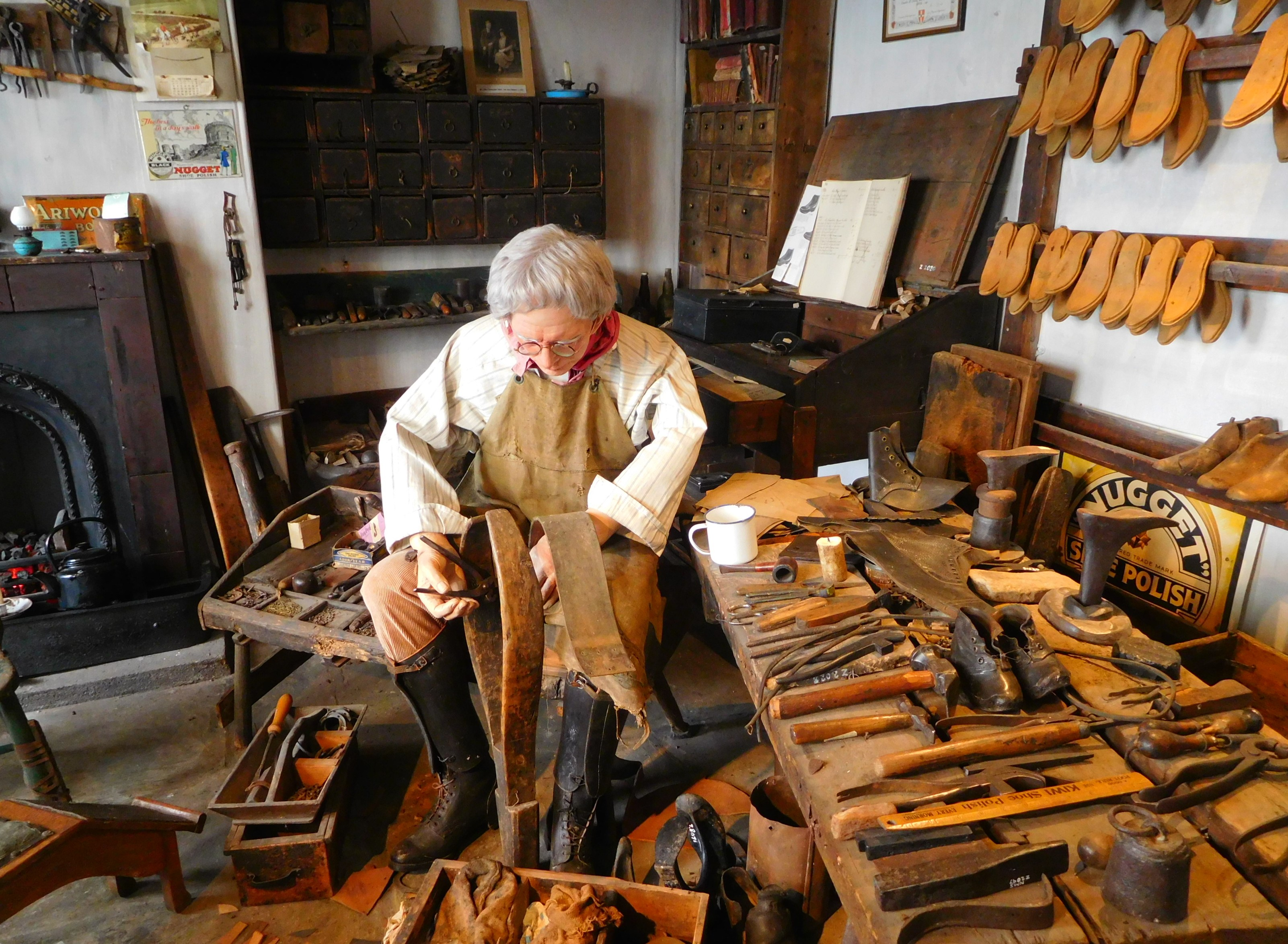
Cobbler's shop

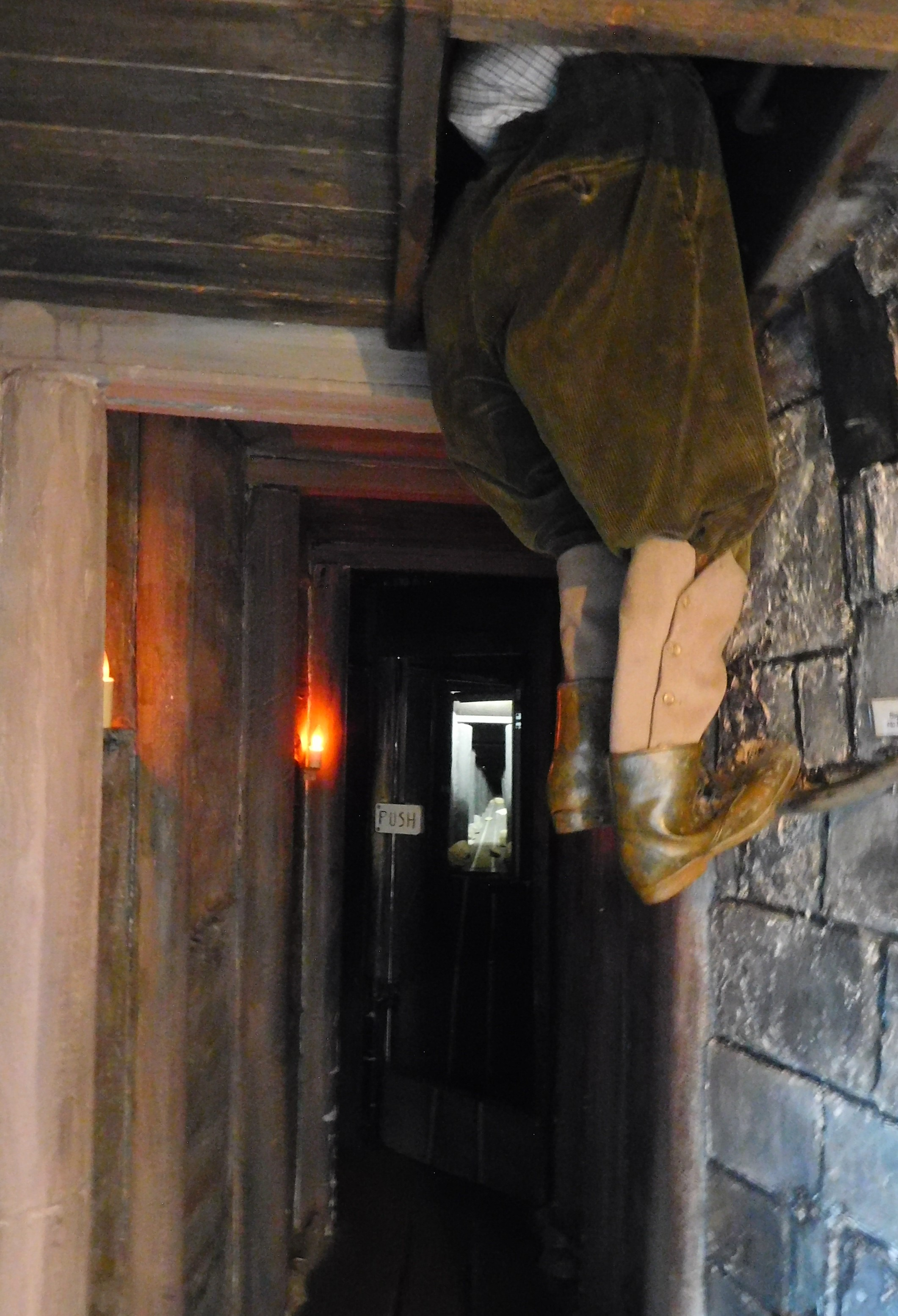
Re-creation of a tunnel in a lead mine

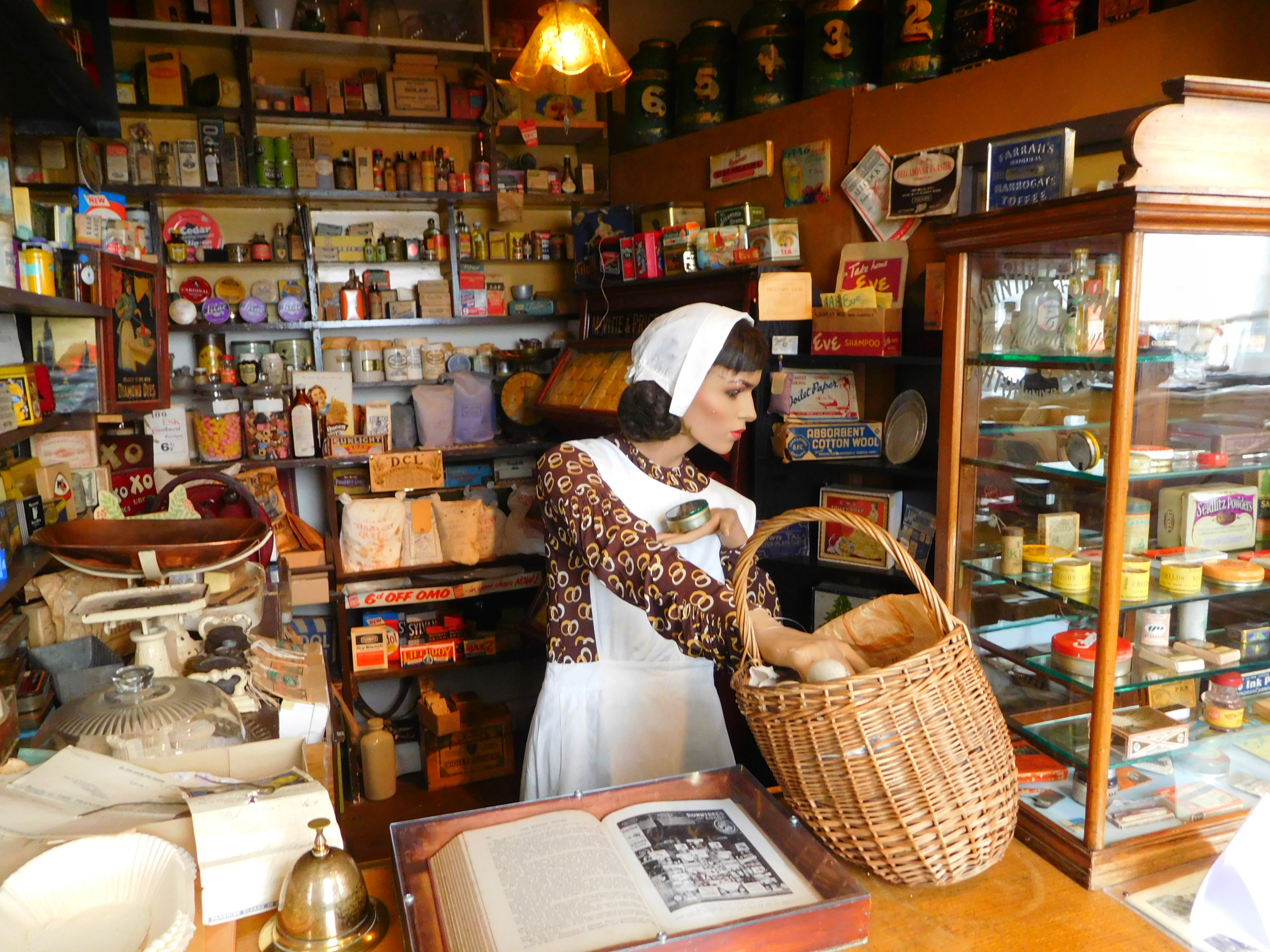
General store from the 1940s

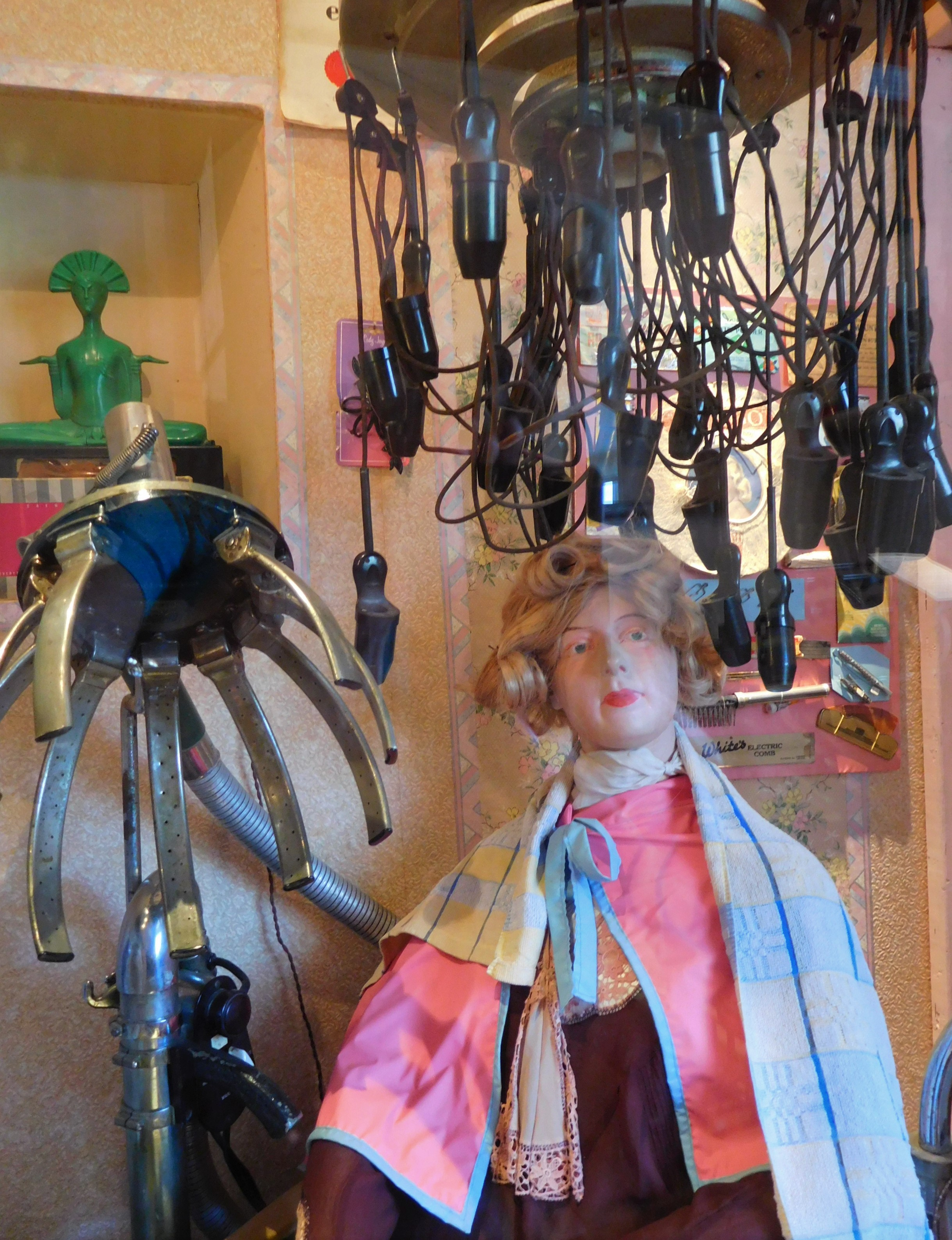
Hairdressing salon from the 1950s

== History of the museum ==
The museum was established in 1975 by a group of local enthusiasts. Some of the group had been members of the local history class which wrote A History of Nidderdale, first published in 1967, and they invited Bernard Jennings, editor of the History, to become one of the first trustees. Harrogate Borough Council provided premises for the museum in the redundant offices of the Ripon and Pateley Bridge Rural District Council, originally built as a workhouse in 1863.

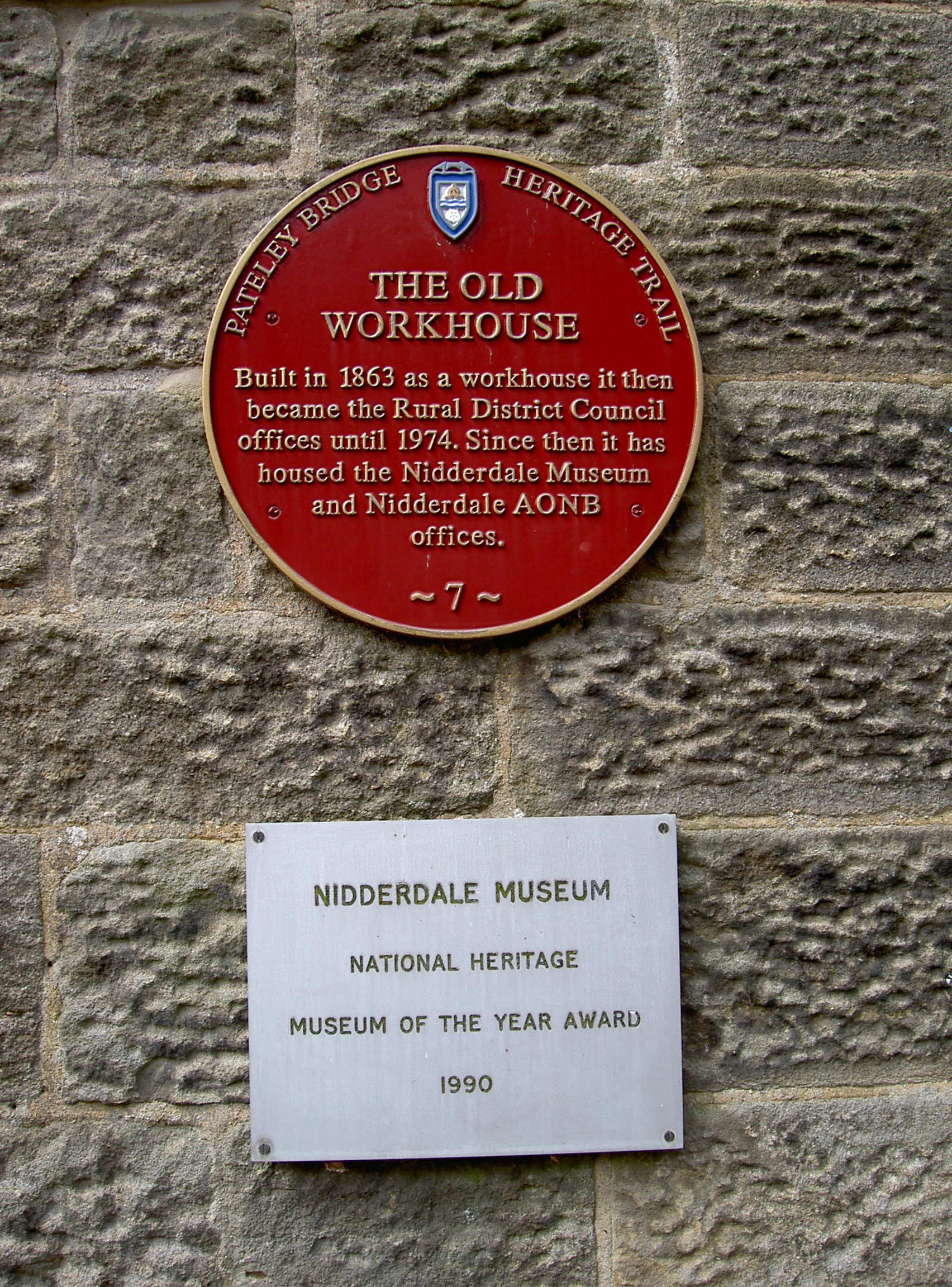

In 1990 the museum won the National Heritage Museum of the Year Award for "The Museum which does the Most with the Least". In 2017 the volunteers at Nidderdale Museum were honoured with the Queen's Award.
