= Pateley Bridge =

Market town in North Yorkshire, England

Coordinates: 54°05′14″N 1°45′36″W

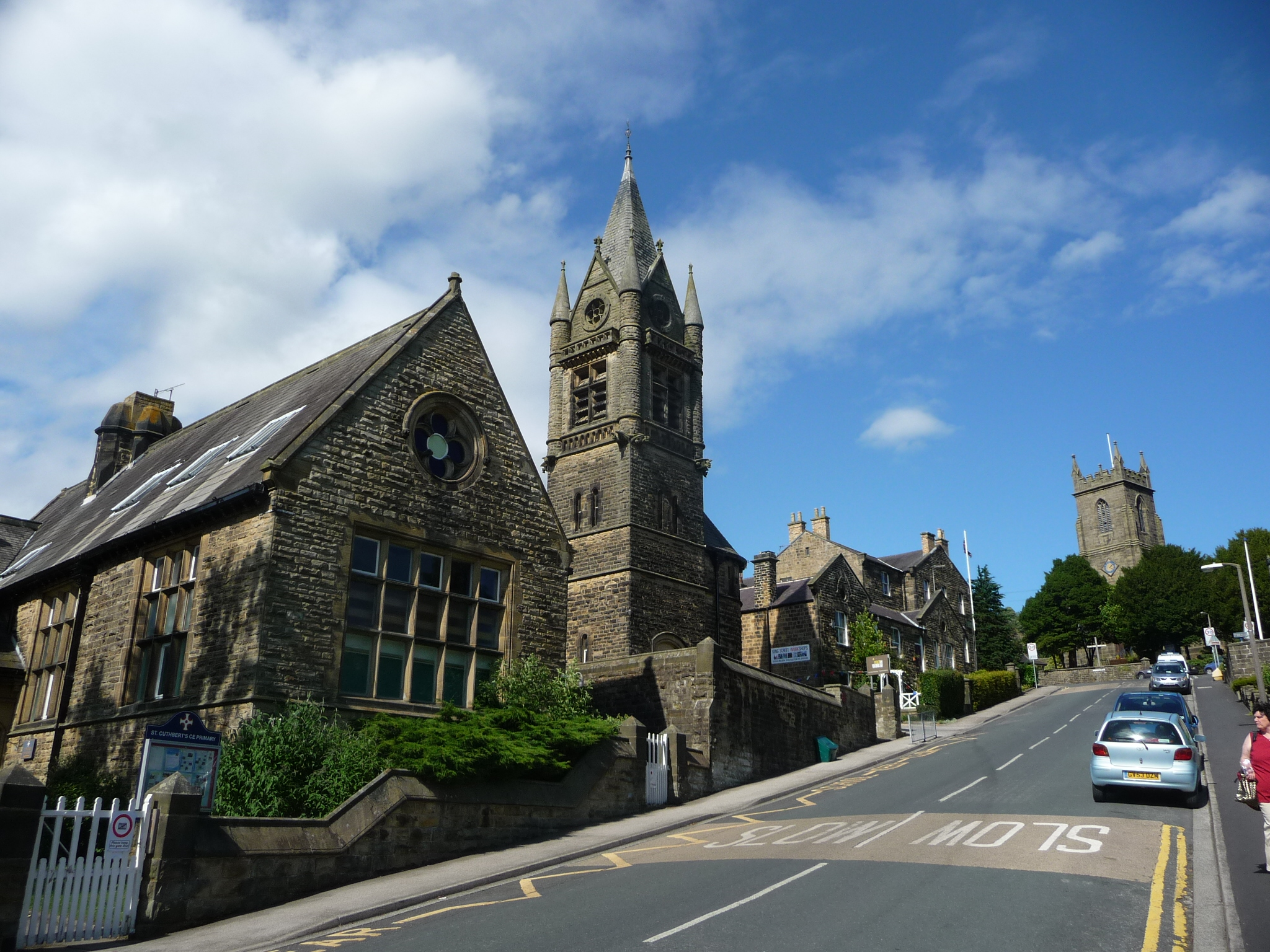
- Pateley Bridge

- Location within North Yorkshire
- Population: 1,432 (2011 census)
- OS grid reference: SE155655
- Civil parish: High and Low Bishopside
- Unitary authority: North Yorkshire
- Ceremonial county: North Yorkshire
- Region: Yorkshire and the Humber
- Country: England
- Sovereign state: United Kingdom
- Post town: Harrogate
- Postcode district: HG3
- Dialling code: 01423
- Police: North Yorkshire
- Fire: North Yorkshire
- Ambulance: Yorkshire
- UK Parliament: Skipton and Ripon

Pateley Bridge (known locally as Pateley) is a market town in the civil parish of High and Low Bishopside, in Nidderdale, in the county and district of North Yorkshire, England. Historically part of the West Riding of Yorkshire, it lies on the River Nidd. It is in the Yorkshire Dales and just outside the Yorkshire Dales National Park.

The town has the oldest sweet shop in the world. Established in 1827, it is housed in one of the earliest buildings in Pateley Bridge, dating from 1661. Pateley Bridge is also the home of the Nidderdale Museum.

The last Dales agricultural show of the year, the Nidderdale Show, is held annually on the showground by the River Nidd. The show attracts more than 14,000 visitors each year.

The town is within the Nidderdale National Landscape, an Area of Outstanding Natural Beauty. The town was listed in both the 2017 and 2018 Sunday Times reports on Best Places to Live in northern England. The local tourist authority bills it as "the perfect place to start your exploration of the Yorkshire Dales".

== History ==
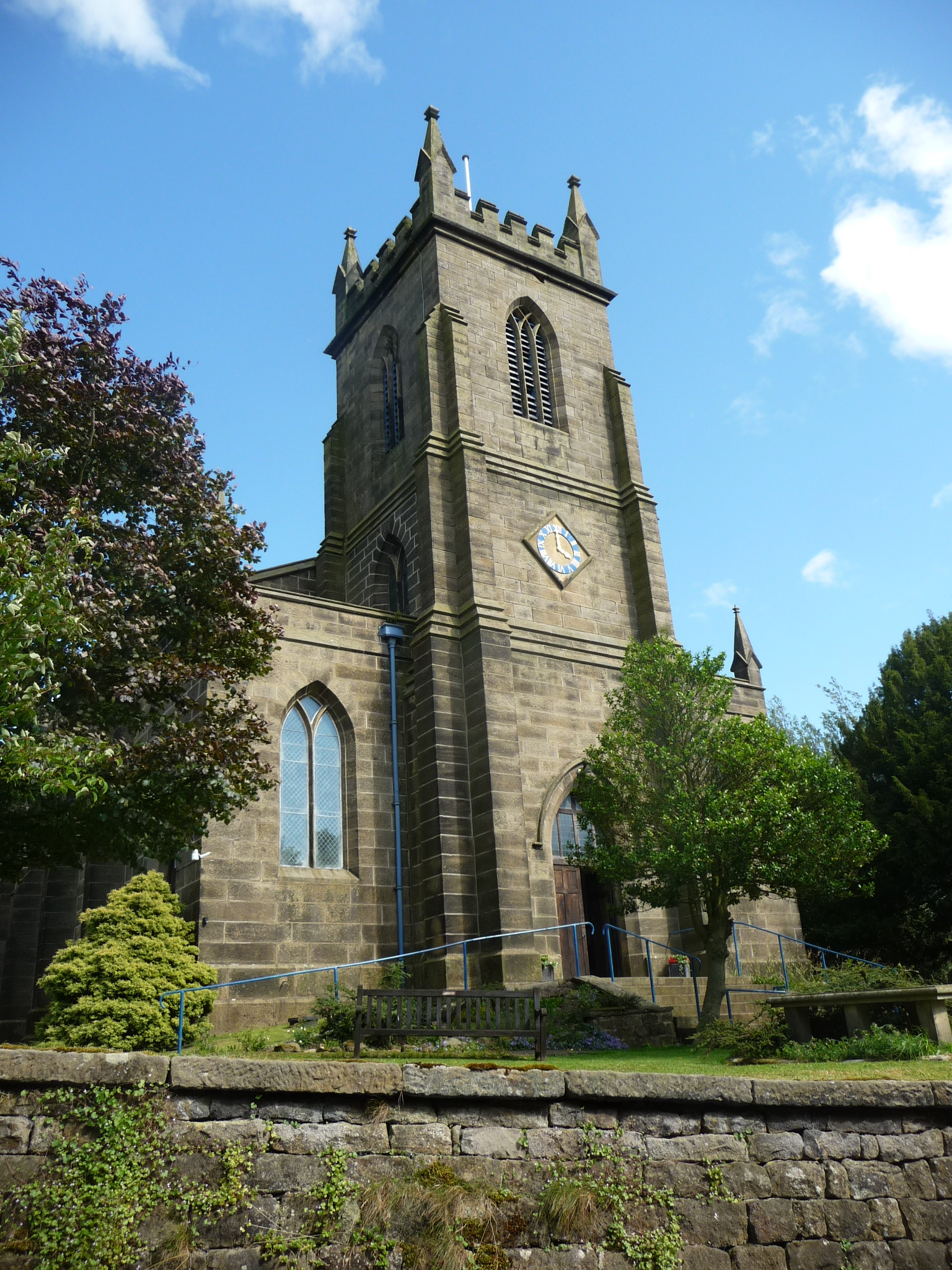
St Cuthbert’s Church

In the early Middle Ages the site of Pateley lay in lands of the Archbishop of York, which came to be known as Bishopside. In the 12th century the principal settlement in Bishopside was at Wilsill, rather than Pateley. Pateley was first recorded in 1175 (though the document survives in a later copy), as Patleiagate, with 14th century forms including Patheleybrig(ge). The final elements are clear, deriving from Old Norse gata ('street') and the northern dialect form brig ('bridge') respectively. The bridge is Pateley Bridge over the River Nidd.

There is more debate about the Pateley section of the name: the usual explanation is Old English pæþ ('path') in the genitive plural form paða + lēah ('open ground, clearing in a forest'); paða lēah would mean "woodland clearing of the paths", referring to paths up Nidderdale and from Ripon to Craven, which intersected here. However, the Pateley name forms competed in the Middle Ages with forms like Padlewath (1227) and Patheslayewathe which could be from Middle English *padil ('a shallow place in water') + Old Norse vath ('ford') and it could be that they owe something to this name. The local story that the name comes from 'Pate', an old Yorkshire dialect word for 'Badger', is incorrect.

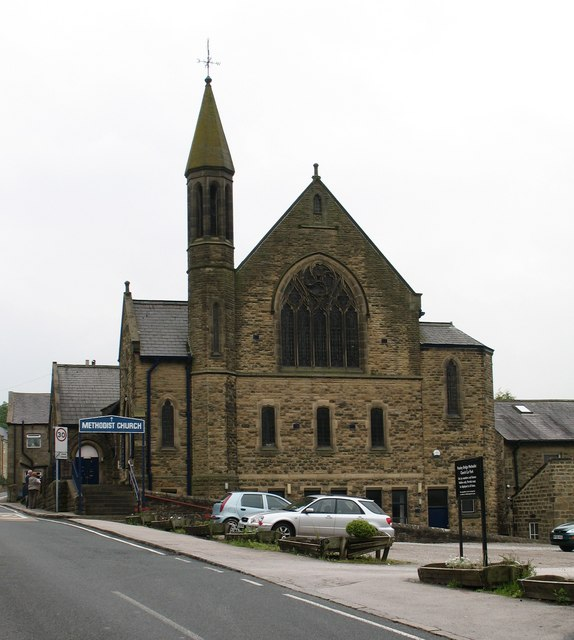
Pateley Bridge Methodist Church

In 1320 the Archbishop of York granted a charter for a market and fair at Pateley. From the 14th century until the early part of the 20th century, Scotgate Ash Quarry despatched hard-wearing sandstone from its site on the northern flank above Pateley Bridge. In 1862 the railway arrived in Nidderdale, and the stone was then exported by train and was used in railway platforms, national buildings and harbour walls. Scotgate Ash Quarry closed in 1915.

Pateley Bridge has had two railway stations. Between 1862 and the Beeching cuts in 1964, Pateley Bridge railway station was the terminus of the railway line running up Nidderdale from Nidd Valley Junction, near Harrogate. Between 1907 and 1937, the Nidd Valley Light Railway ran farther up the dale from a separate railway station. Access is now by road, with an hourly bus service from Harrogate.

All Creatures Great and Small TV series was filmed mostly in the Yorkshire Dales with many of the Dales scenes filmed in the National Park around Nidderdale. The crossroads that are so important in the Christmas episode are "on the roads above Pateley Bridge".

== Local government ==
Pateley Bridge was once in the Lower Division of Claro Wapentake. In the 19th century local government reforms the town fell within the Pateley Bridge Poor Law Union, later the Pateley Bridge Rural Sanitary District and from 1894 Pateley Bridge Rural District. In 1937 the rural district was merged to become part of Ripon and Pateley Bridge Rural District.

From 1974 to 2023 the town was within the Borough of Harrogate in North Yorkshire. The area is now administered by the North Yorkshire Council unitary authority.

The town is in the electoral ward of Pateley Bridge, which includes the whole of upper Nidderdale as far as Stonebeck Up, with a total population at the 2011 Census of 2,718.

Pateley Bridge is the largest settlement in the civil parish of High and Low Bishopside, Pateley Bridge was granted town status in 1986, and the High and Low Bishopside Parish Council was renamed Pateley Bridge Town Council. However, the official name of the civil parish remains High and Low Bishopside.

The population of the Pateley Bridge Built-up area, which includes Bridgehousegate and Bewerley village, both outside the parish, was 1,432 in 2011.

== Local media ==
Local news and television programmes are provided by BBC Yorkshire and ITV Yorkshire. Television signals are received from the local relay TV transmitter.

Local radio stations are BBC Radio York on 104.3 FM, Greatest Hits Radio Harrogate and the Yorkshire Dales on 107.1 FM and Dales Radio on 104.9 FM.

The Pateley Bridge and Nidderdale Herald is the town's local newspaper.

== Amenities ==
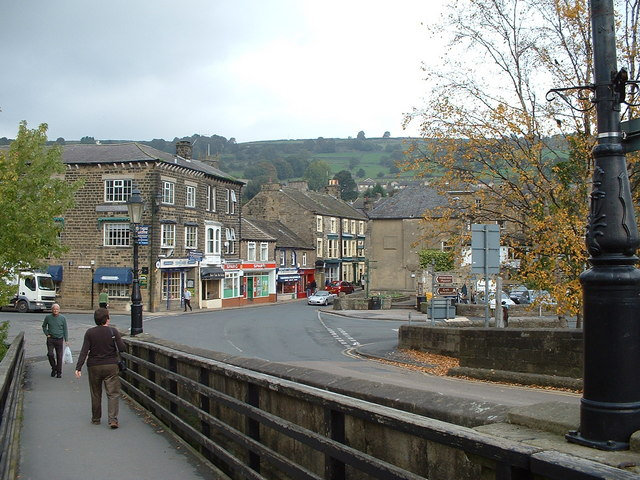
Pateley Bridge from the bridge

The town can be reached by bus from Harrogate (Harrogate Bus Company number 24 service). Nidderdale is also served by DalesBus services on summer Sundays. The nearest railway station is at Harrogate. Highway access is via A1(M) and the A61 to the east, and the A65, A59, M65 and M62 to the south.

There are bed and breakfast houses, St Cuthbert's Church, Pateley Bridge, a Methodist chapel and a Roman Catholic church, a garage, hotels, Nidderdale Museum, public houses, public library, public park, restaurants, a primary school and a secondary school (Nidderdale High School), shops and a theatre (Pateley Playhouse). Bewerley Park Centre for Outdoor Education is in the nearby village of Bewerley. Brimham Rocks and Stump Cross Caverns are also close by.

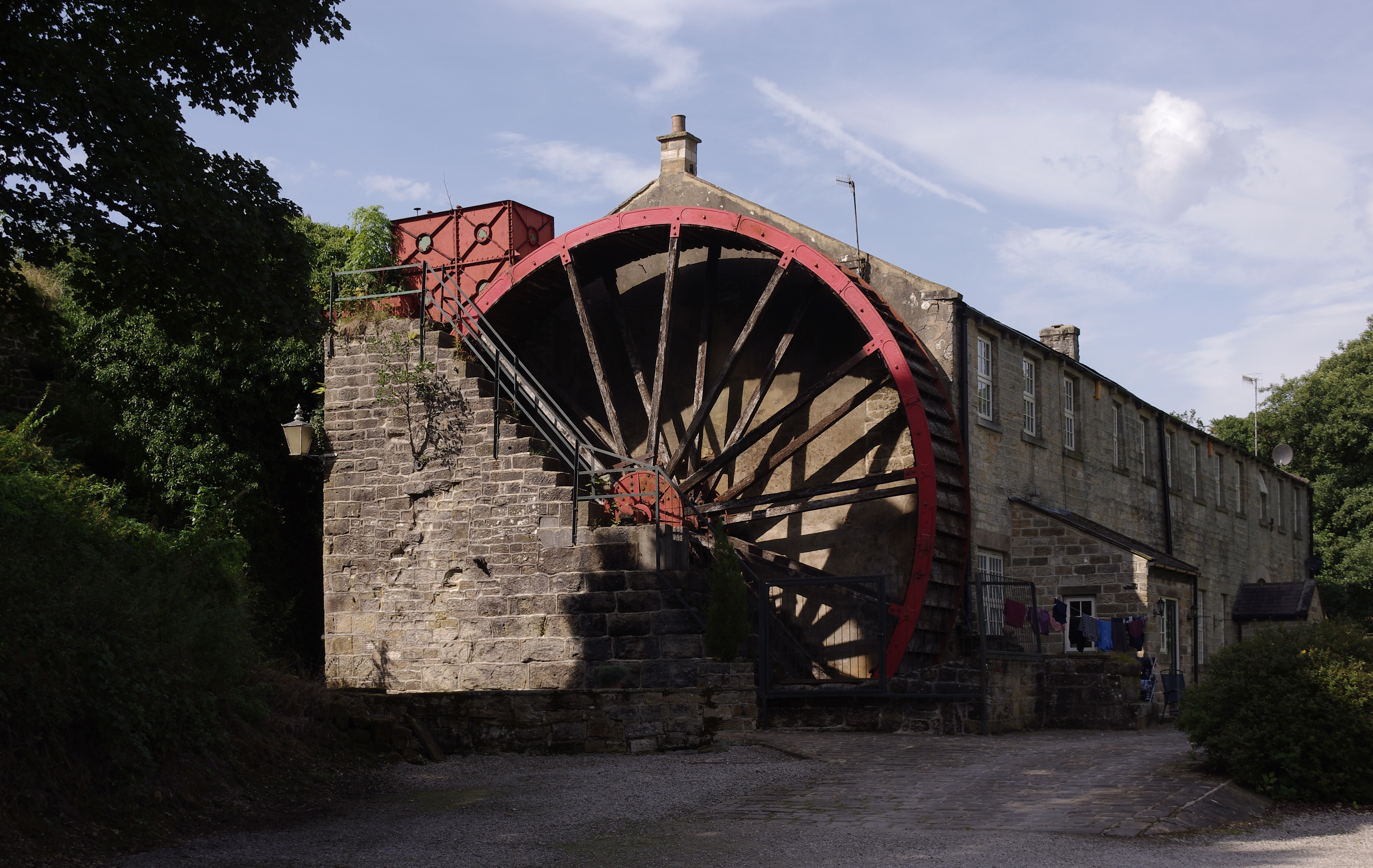
The Bridge Inn

The Nidderdale Way and Six Dales Trail both pass through the town.

The town is also a cricketing hub, with several teams (known collectively as 'The Badgers') competing in various leagues. Crown green bowling is also a popular pastime.

Pateley is also served by Nidderdale Pool and Leisure Centre. Comprising a 20-metre swimming pool, gym, sports hall and two squash courts, the facility officially opened in 2005 after many years of local fundraising.

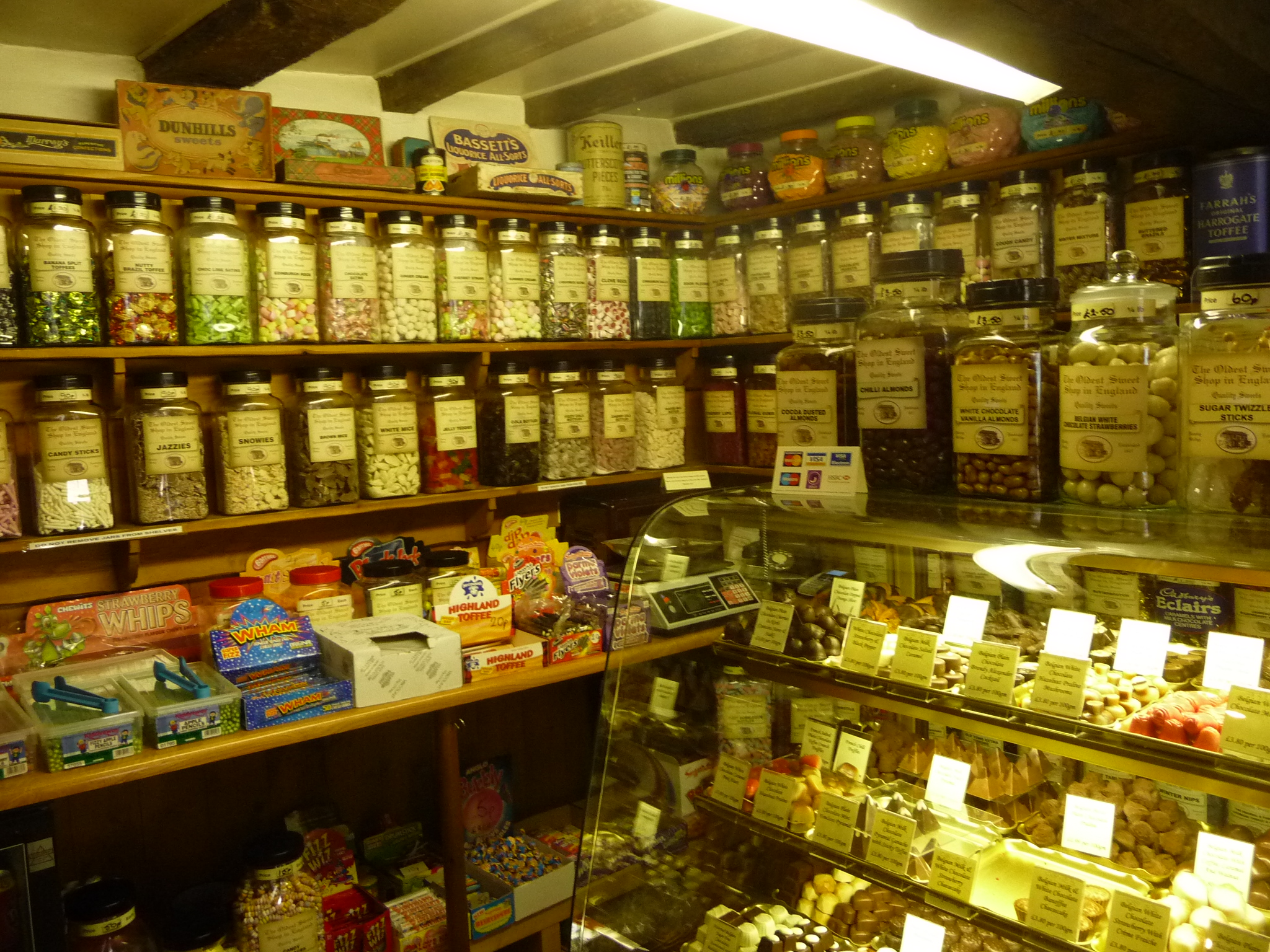
"Oldest Sweet Shop in England"

The town is also famous for the "Oldest Sweet Shop in England", which was established in 1827 and is validated as the longest continuous trading sweet shop in the world (Guinness World Records Book 2014); it is housed in one of the oldest buildings in Pateley Bridge, built in 1661. The business had been owned for nearly 25 years by Keith Tordoff, who sold it on to a new owner in March 2021.

King Street workshops can be found on King Street and house a group of artists and designers. Their studios are open and they include jewellers, milliner, textile art and gifts, sculptors, fine artist and glassblowers.

The AONB website provides specifics for activities within the Area of Outstanding Natural Beauty including maps of popular walks, and information on canoeing and kayaking, caving, climbing, cycling, fishing and horse riding.

Madge Hill Campsite, east of Pateley Bridge, is maintained by a team from West Leeds Scout District. The site was presented to Farsley District Scouts in 1930 by the Hainsworth family. The site has a bunkhouse and space for camping.

== Climate ==
Like much of the British Isles, Pateley Bridge has a Temperate Maritime Climate. The warmest temperature recorded was 31.0 °C (87.8 °F) on 1 July 2015. The nearest location where data is available is Dishforth Airfield. It is particularly notable that the warmest and the coldest temperatures for May both occurred in 2010, within the space of just 12 days. The heatwave at the beginning of October 2011 was so extreme that the warmest October temperature was recorded, and it was higher than the record high of September in any year. With a mean temperature of 11.4 °C (52.5 °F), December 2015 was easily the warmest December ever recorded, and the warmest ever December temperature of 16.2 °C (61.2 °F) was reached on 19th. In contrast, the December 2010 mean temperature was −1.9 °C (28.6 °F), and the coldest ever temperature of −15.0 °C (5.0 °F) was reached on the 6th.

Climate data for Pateley Bridge, 154m amsl (1981–2010) (extremes 1992–)
Month	Jan	Feb	Mar	Apr	May	Jun	Jul	Aug	Sep	Oct	Nov	Dec	Year
Record high °C (°F)	14.6 (58.3)	16.2 (61.2)	21.0 (69.8)	23.9 (75.0)	27.2 (81.0)	30.6 (87.1)	31.0 (87.8)	30.8 (87.4)	27.2 (81.0)	27.5 (81.5)	17.7 (63.9)	16.2 (61.2)	31.0 (87.8)
Mean daily maximum °C (°F)	6.8 (44.2)	7.3 (45.1)	9.9 (49.8)	12.4 (54.3)	15.7 (60.3)	18.5 (65.3)	21.0 (69.8)	20.5 (68.9)	17.8 (64.0)	13.6 (56.5)	9.6 (49.3)	6.8 (44.2)	13.3 (56.0)
Mean daily minimum °C (°F)	0.8 (33.4)	0.8 (33.4)	2.2 (36.0)	3.8 (38.8)	6.4 (43.5)	9.3 (48.7)	11.5 (52.7)	11.2 (52.2)	9.2 (48.6)	6.4 (43.5)	3.2 (37.8)	0.8 (33.4)	5.5 (41.8)
Record low °C (°F)	−11.0 (12.2)	−8.8 (16.2)	−7.2 (19.0)	−4.1 (24.6)	−2.5 (27.5)	1.6 (34.9)	4.2 (39.6)	2.5 (36.5)	0.8 (33.4)	−4.3 (24.3)	−9.0 (15.8)	−15.0 (5.0)	−15.0 (5.0)
Average precipitation mm (inches)	53.2 (2.09)	42.2 (1.66)	45.7 (1.80)	49.3 (1.94)	45.1 (1.78)	59.8 (2.35)	51.2 (2.02)	60.1 (2.37)	53.4 (2.10)	64.0 (2.52)	60.3 (2.37)	58.6 (2.31)	642.9 (25.31)
Average rainy days (≥ 1 mm)	11.8	9.2	9.1	9.4	9.8	9.9	9.0	9.6	8.7	10.7	10.9	10.3	118.4
Mean monthly sunshine hours	51.2	76.6	107.0	159.5	190.5	162.2	184.5	173.0	133.9	96.1	60.3	58.6	1,453.4
Source 1: Met Office
Source 2: Climate Dishforth

== In film ==
Many of the locations were featured in the 1970 film Wuthering Heights.

== See also ==
- Listed buildings in High and Low Bishopside
