= Pateley Playhouse =

Theatre in Pateley Bridge, North Yorkshire, England

Coordinates: 54.08677°N 1.75860°W

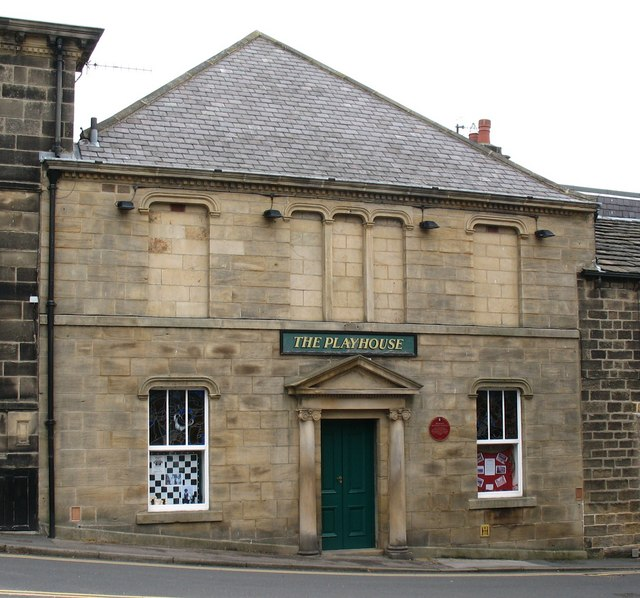
Front view

The Pateley Playhouse is a small amateur-run theatre in the town of Pateley Bridge in Nidderdale, North Yorkshire, England.

The building was initially a Primitive Methodist Chapel but was abandoned in the late 1930s. It was bought by the Pateley Bridge Dramatic Society, a local group active since 1937, who transformed into a theatre seating 73 people. It saw its first production, a version of When We Are Married by J.B. Priestley, in June 1968.
