= High Hall =

House in Appletreewick, North Yorkshire, England

Coordinates: 54°02′12″N 1°55′06″W

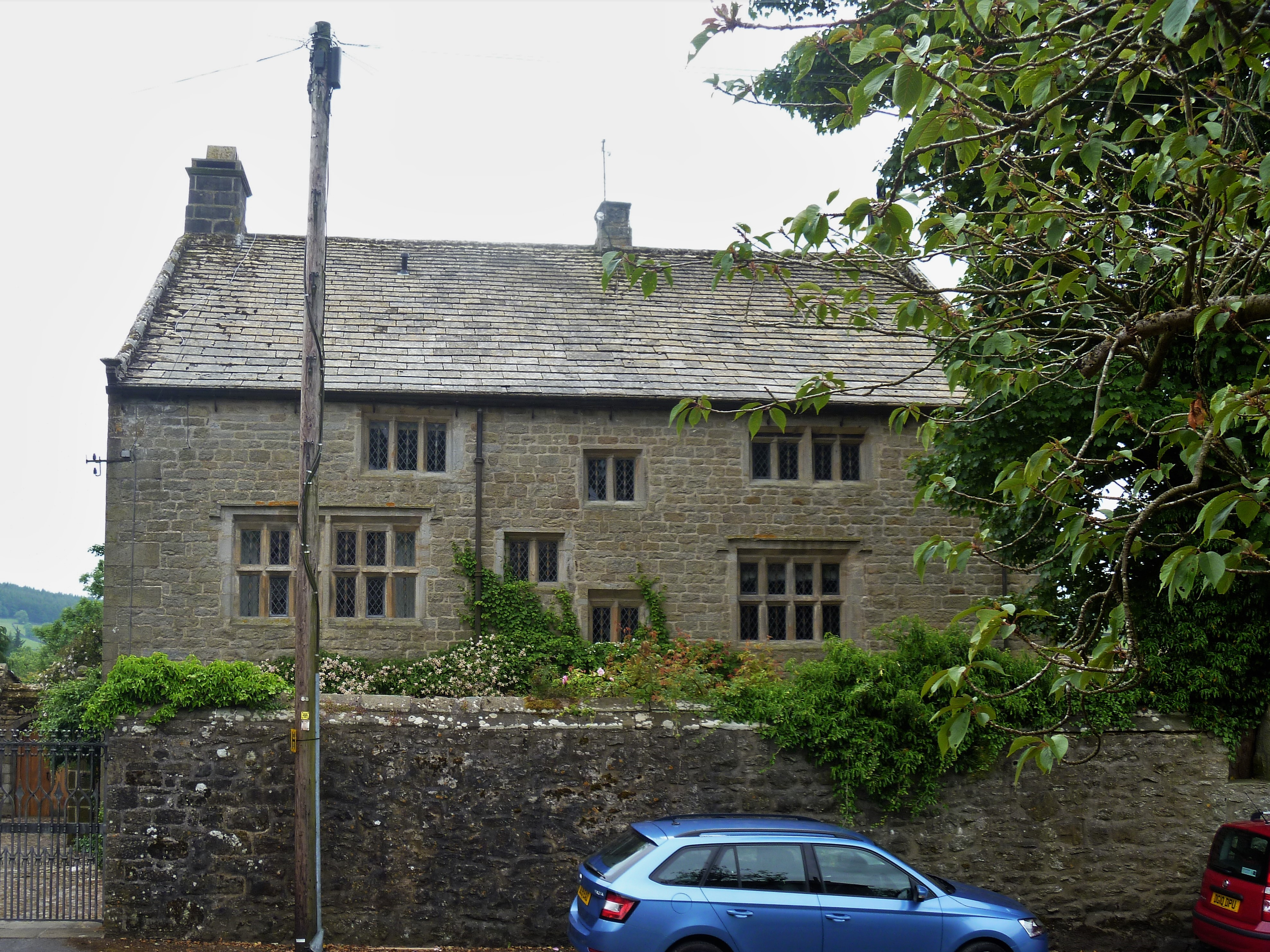
The house, in 2021

High Hall is a historic building in Appletreewick, a village in North Yorkshire in England.

The house was built in 1535, by the father of William Craven, a Lord Mayor of London. The building was altered in the 17th century. The house was Grade II* listed in 1954. It was extensively restored in the early 21st century, and was then made available as a holiday let. In 2023, it was placed on the market, for £2.5 million.

The stone house has three storeys and a basement. It is two bays wide, and has a central porch. On the ground floor is the great hall, which has an eight-light mullioned and transomed window, with some 17th century diamond pane glazing. There are similar, smaller windows around the rest of the house, with the five illuminating the staircase being stepped. There is a further porch on the right-hand side. Inside, the great hall has an inglenook fireplace and diamond-shaped stone paving. Above it is a drawing room with a frieze dating from about 1600. Many of the original fittings survive, including the dogleg staircase.

== See also ==
- Listed buildings in Appletreewick
