= St John the Baptist's Church, Appletreewick =

Grade II church in North Yorkshire, England

Coordinates: 54°02′14″N 1°55′05″W

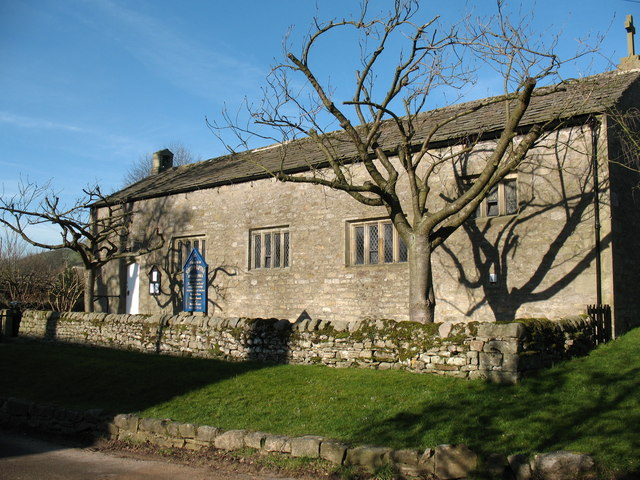
The church, in 2008

St John's Church is an Anglican church in Appletreewick, a village in North Yorkshire, in England.

The building was originally constructed in the 17th century, as a pair of cottages. Appletreewick fell within the parish of St Wilfrid's Church, Burnsall, and in the 1890s William Stavert was appointed as its minister. Stavert decided to turn the derelict cottages into a chapel-of-ease, and he designed the new church himself. It was completed in 1898, and was Grade II listed in 1954.

The single-storey building is constructed of stone with a stone slate roof. It consists of a single, rectangular, cell, and has four bays. The doorway has a chamfered surround and a four-centred arched head, and the windows are mullioned.

== See also ==
- Listed buildings in Appletreewick
