= Skyreholme =

Village in North Yorkshire, England

Coordinates: 54.04181°N 1.89780°W

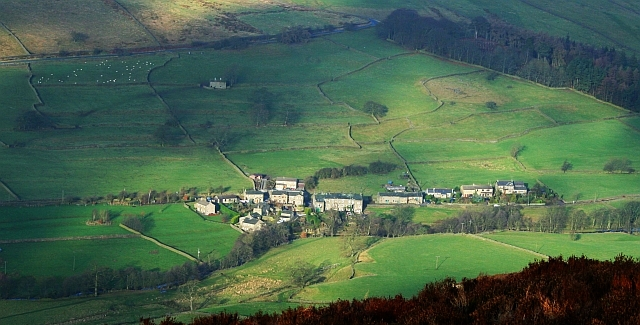
- Skyreholme from Simon's Seat

- Location within North Yorkshire
- OS grid reference: SE066605
- Civil parish: Appletreewick
- Unitary authority: North Yorkshire
- Ceremonial county: North Yorkshire
- Region: Yorkshire and the Humber
- Country: England
- Sovereign state: United Kingdom
- Post town: SKIPTON
- Postcode district: BD23
- Dialling code: 01756
- Police: North Yorkshire
- Fire: North Yorkshire
- Ambulance: Yorkshire
- UK Parliament: Skipton and Ripon

Skyreholme is a hamlet in Wharfedale in the Yorkshire Dales, North Yorkshire, England. It lies 1-mile (1.6 km) east of Appletreewick, in the small side valleys formed by Skyreholme Beck and Blands Beck, which meet in the hamlet to form Fir Beck, a short tributary of the River Wharfe. Parcevall Hall is at the north end of the hamlet, and Skyreholme Beck flows through the limestone gorge of Trollers Gill just to the north.

The toponym, first recorded in 1540, is of Old Norse origin, from skírr "bright" and holmr "water-meadow", and so means "bright water-meadow". Skyreholme was historically in the township of Appletreewick in the large ancient parish of Burnsall in the West Riding of Yorkshire.

In the early 19th century the hamlet had a substantial population (234 in the 1841 census). The main industry was a cotton and calico mill. To serve this population a chapel of ease was built in 1837. The chapel closed in 1897, but from 1867 the building was also used as a school, which continued until 1967. The village is home to Parcevall Hall, a grade II listed building which has 24 acres (9.7 ha) of gardens with plants from around the world.

== See also ==
- Listed buildings in Appletreewick
