= National Association of Pastoral Care in Education =

Pastoral care association

- Formation: 1982; 44 years ago
- Type: Charity
- Location: Nuneaton, England
- Official language: English
- Key people: Phil Jones (Chair)
- Website: www.napce.org.uk

The National Association of Pastoral Care in Education (NAPCE) is a registered charity in the United Kingdom. It runs the National Pastoral Care Awards annually for UK schools.

== Publication ==
NAPCE produce four issues of Pastoral Care in Education every year, an international journal publishing research on personal, social and emotional development across the curriculum.
