= Rylstone Manor =

Country house hotel in Shanklin, Isle of Wight, England

Coordinates: 50.625879°N 1.175633°W

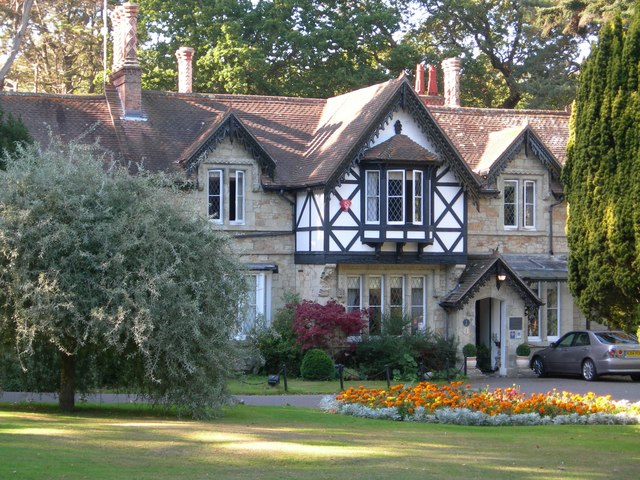
Rylstone Manor Hotel

Rylstone Manor (or Rylstone Chalet) is a manor house and was a museum in Shanklin, on the Isle of Wight, England. The building was originally constructed as a gentleman's residence in 1863 and remained privately owned until 1923. Of Victorian style, it includes Gothic, Tudor and Georgian influences.

Rylstone Manor is now a hotel. The building is constructed of stone, and features include a jettied half-timbered projection. It is located within Rylstone Gardens, a public park.

The Great Masonic Exhibition of 1886 was held on the grounds and at the chalet of Rylstone.

The museum at the Rylstone Chalet was officially opened by Sir Edward Bagnall Poulton on 17 April 1935. The collection included Isle of Wight birds, butterflies, mouths, and eggs.
