= Parcevall Hall =

Country house in North Yorkshire, England

Coordinates: 54.04720°N 1.89630°W

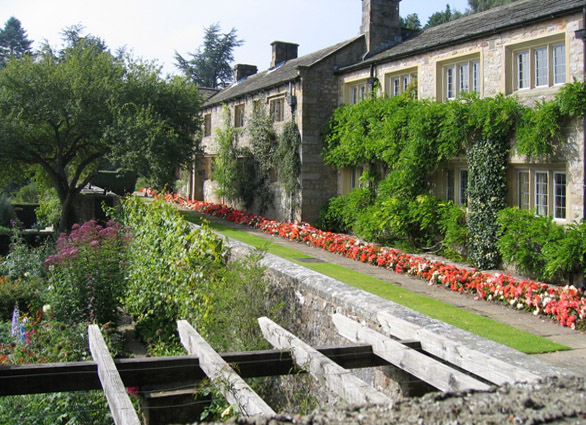
Parcevall Hall and garden

Parcevall Hall, also known as Parceval Hall, and its gardens are located at Skyreholme near Appletreewick village, Wharfedale, North Yorkshire, England. It features a Grade II* listed manor house and landscaped gardens. Currently owned by Walsingham College and leased by the Anglican Diocese of Leeds, it is used as a retreat house and conference centre.

The gardens comprise 24 acres (97,000 m^{2}) of displays, featuring trees and shrubs and herbaceous borders. They are the largest and the only Royal Horticultural Society and English Heritage registered gardens open to the public in the Yorkshire Dales National Park. Created from 1927 onwards they began falling into decline after 1960 following the death of Sir William Milner, 8th Baronet of Nun Appleton. In the mid 1980s, the gardens began to be restored; a process which spanned 25 years.

The gardens are open to the public from April to October.

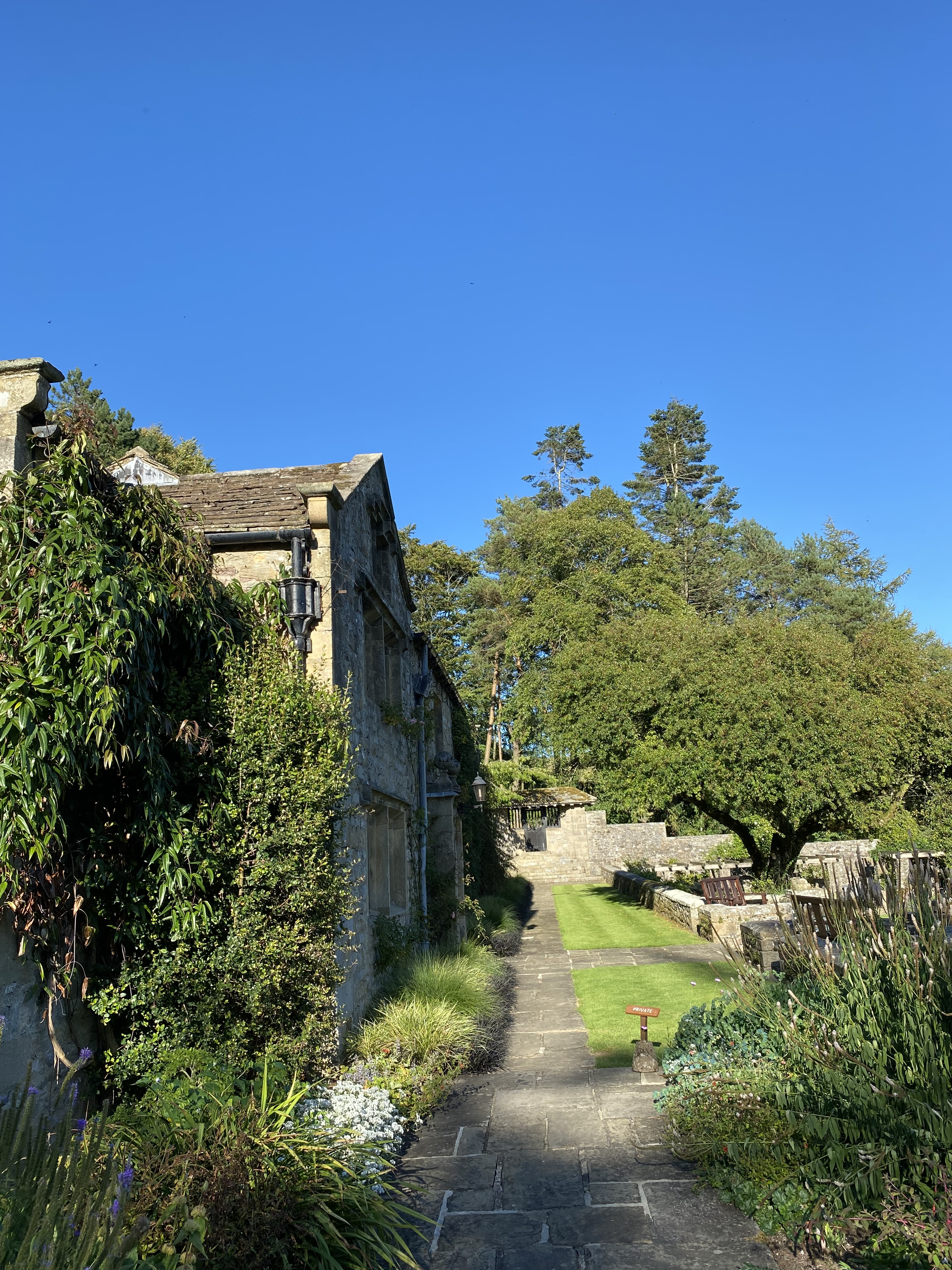
Parcevall Hall Events Programme front cover photograph 2026 taken by Hector Wiggins

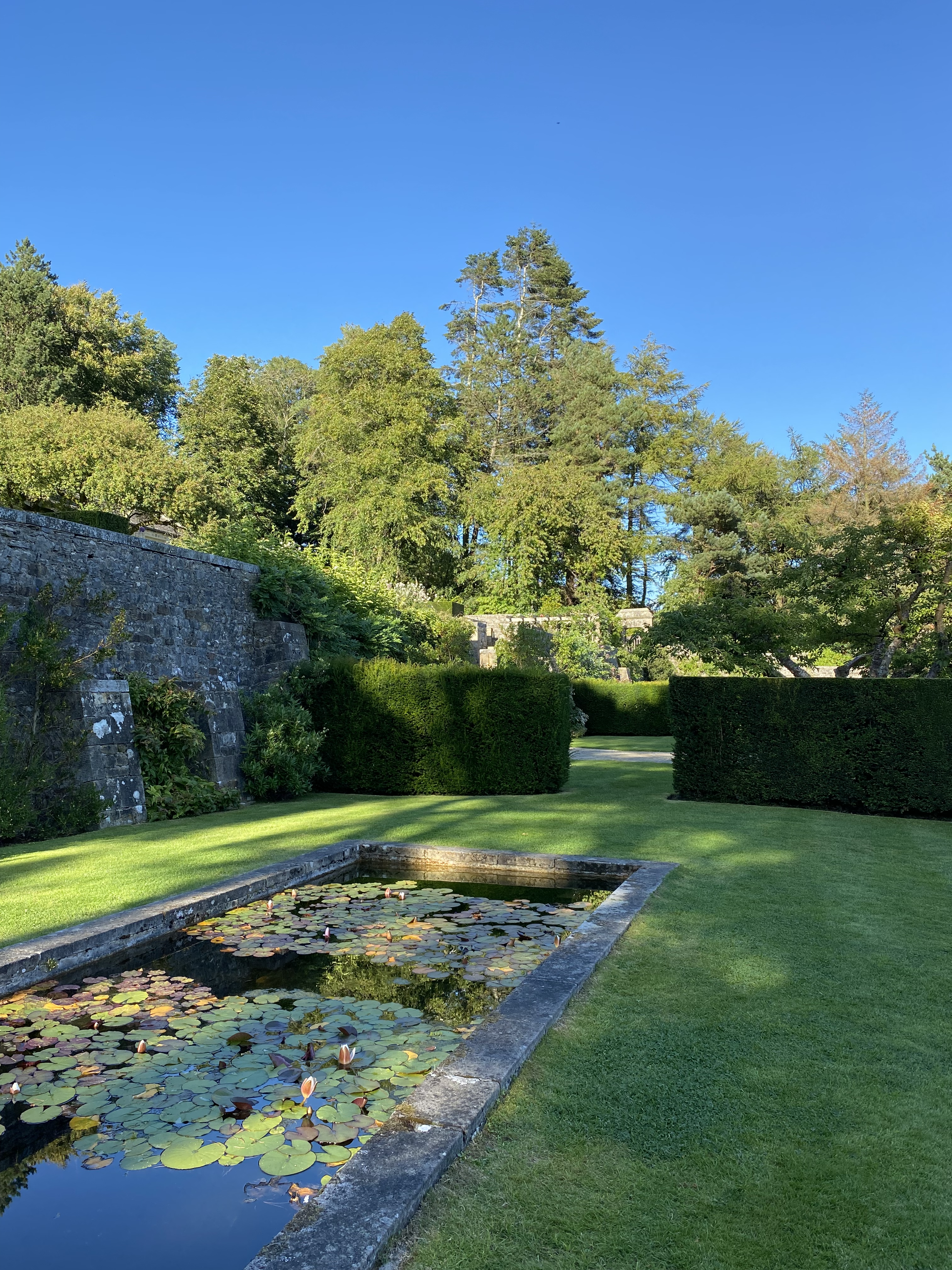
Parcevall Hall Fish Pond, Hector Wiggins

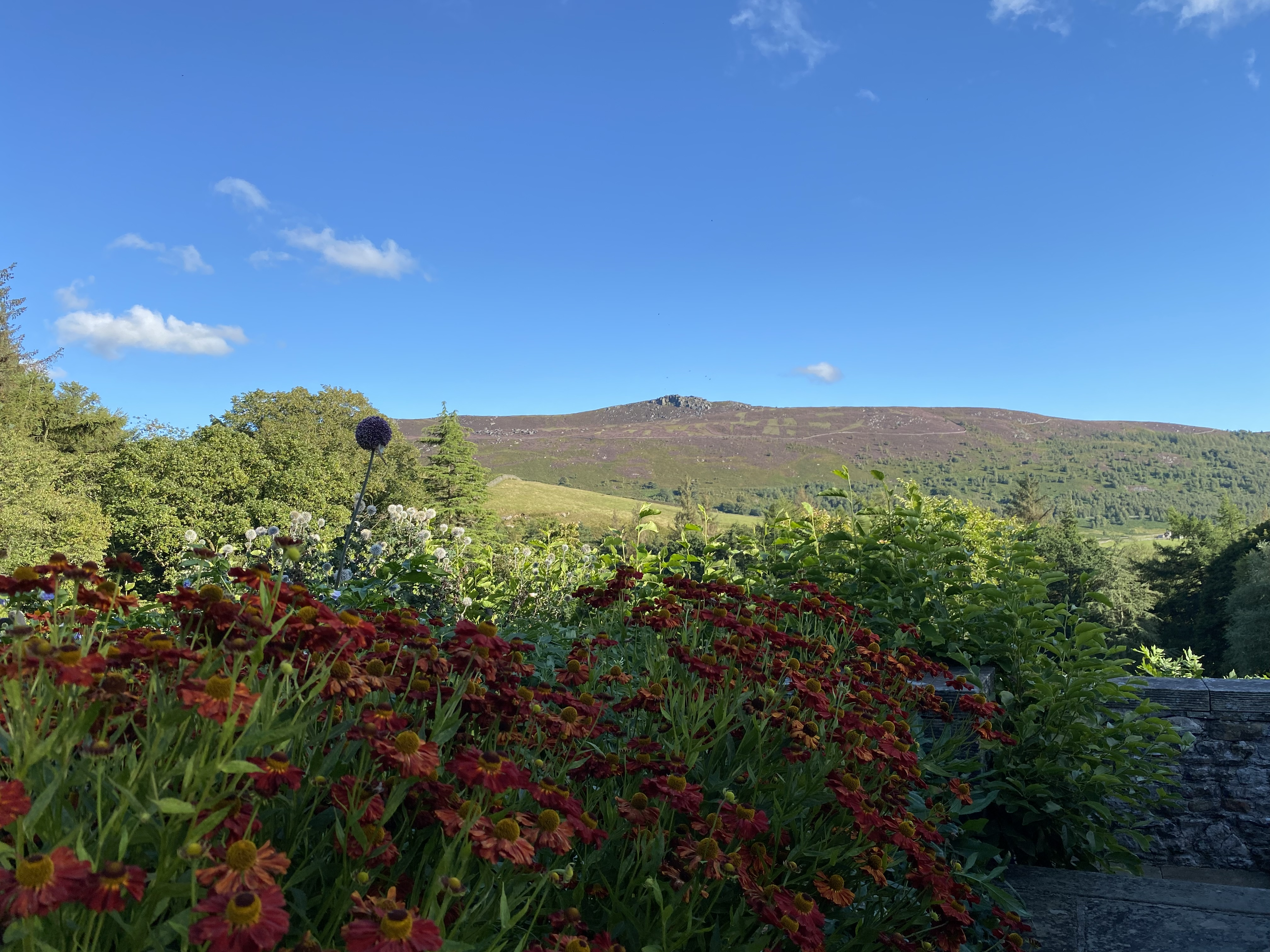
View of Simons Seat from Parcevall Hall, Hector Wiggins

== See also ==
- Grade II* listed buildings in North Yorkshire (district)
- Listed buildings in Appletreewick
