= Simon's Seat =

Peak in the Yorkshire Dales, England

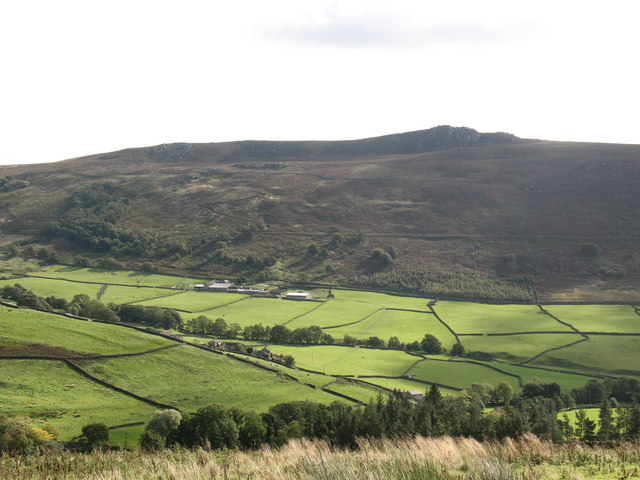
- Simon's Seat from Skyreholme

Highest point
- Elevation: 485 m (1,591 ft)
- Prominence: 102 m (335 ft)
- Parent peak: Great Whernside
- Listing: HuMP
- Coordinates: 54°02′04″N 1°52′49″W

Geography
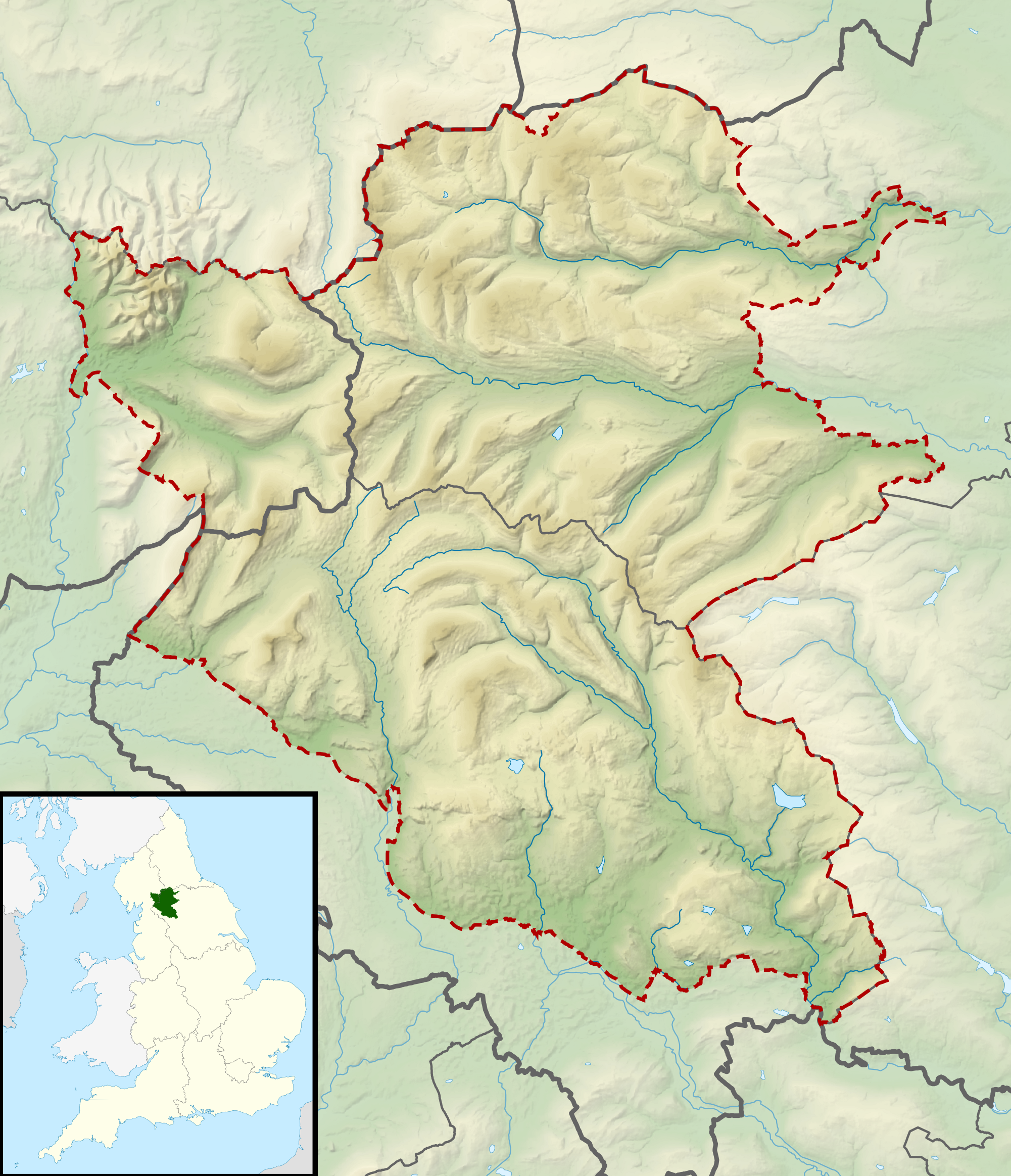
- Location within Yorkshire Dales
- Location: Yorkshire Dales, England
- OS grid: SE079598
- Topo map: OS Explorer OL2

Simon's Seat is a peak in the Yorkshire Dales in northern England. It is a prominent outcrop of millstone grit on the eastern side of Wharfedale. Although only 485 metres (1,591 ft) high, the extensive views from the summit make it a popular destination for walkers.

Simon's Seat is on private land of the Bolton Abbey Estate. There are no public footpaths to the summit, but the summit is on access land. It is usually reached by a permissive route which leads north from Bolton Abbey across the River Wharfe up the Valley of Desolation. The route leads across Barden Fell, which is a grouse moor, sometimes closed to the public during the shooting season. The summit can also be reached by shorter but steeper paths from Howgill or Skyreholme, one mile north of the summit.

== Name ==
There are several explanations of the origin of the name. It was first recorded in 1771, and may have been named after an owner of the estate in a similar way to the nearby crags named Lord's Seat and Earl Seat. A traveller in 1838 recorded a local tale that the crag was named after an infant found there by a shepherd, who named the child Simon. The 19th-century antiquarian Henry Speight thought that it was a high place of Druidic worship, named after the legendary Simon Druid or Simon Magus.
