= Stump Cross Caverns =

Cave system in North Yorkshire, England

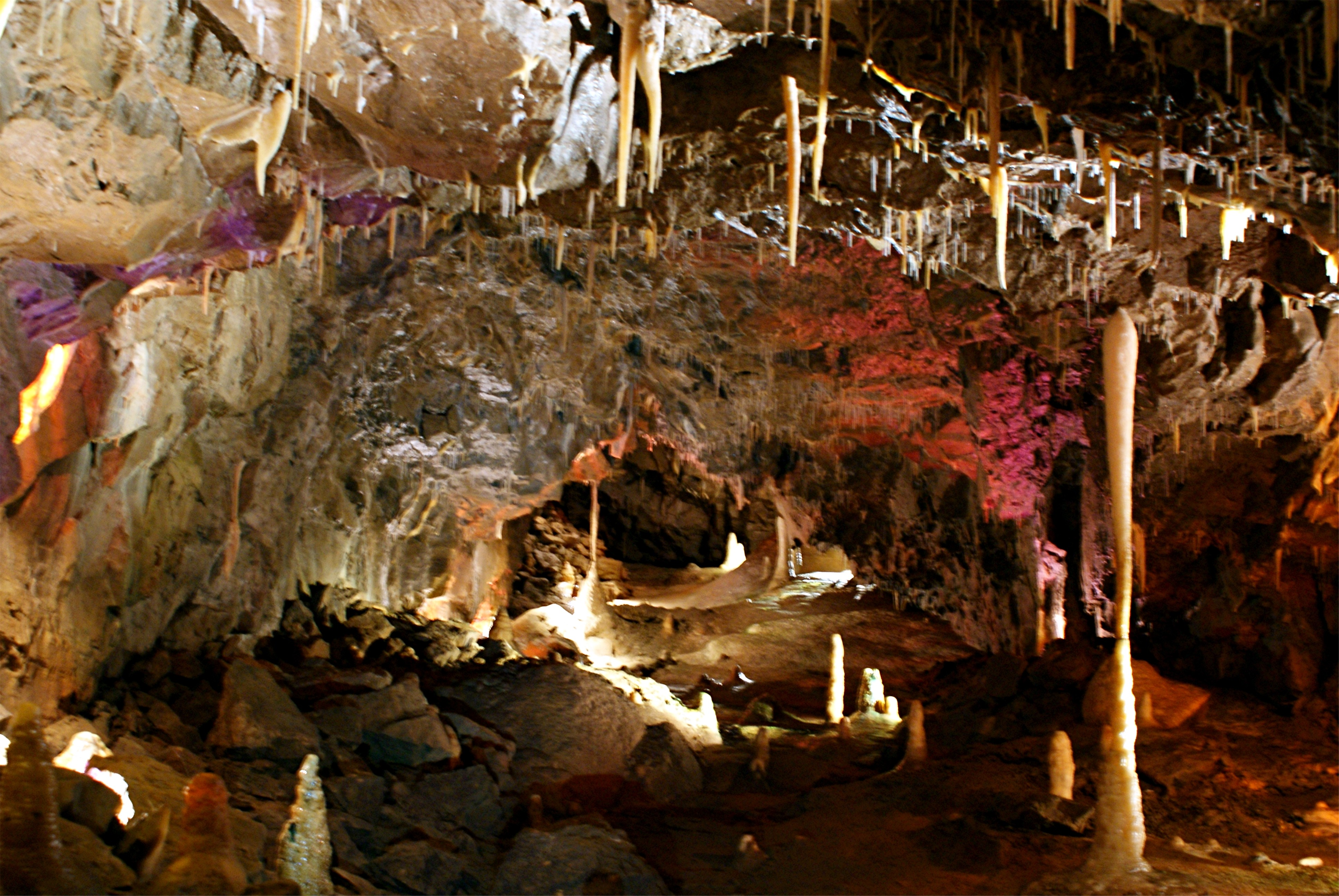

- Location within North Yorkshire
- Location: Greenhow Hill, North Yorkshire
- Coordinates: 54.06739°N 1.86509°W
- Length: 6,200 metres (20,300 ft)
- Discovery: 1860
- Geology: Limestone
- Show cave opened: 1860
- Show cave length: 2,640 feet (800 m)
- Website: Official website

Stump Cross Caverns is a limestone cave system between Wharfedale and Nidderdale in North Yorkshire, England. First discovered around 1860 by the Newbold brothers and further explored in the 1920s, the caverns are now open to the public as a commercial tourist attraction.

== Geography ==
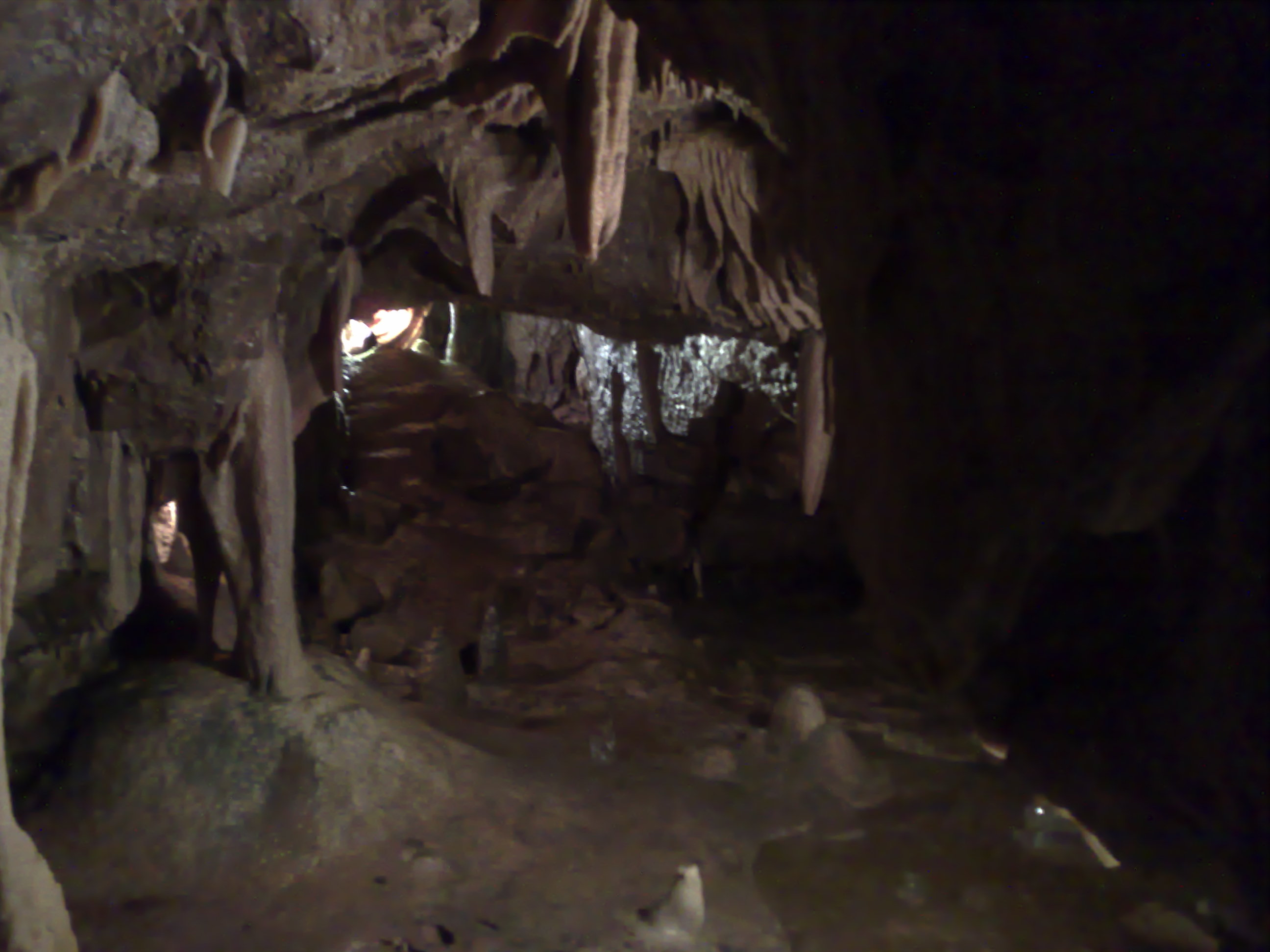
Stump Cross Caverns

The caverns at Stump Cross lie beneath Greenhow Hill, 1,275 feet (389 m) above sea level. Their name was taken from Stump Cross, which in ancient times marked the limit of Knaresborough Forest. The area above the caves consists largely of moorland, the nearest towns being Pateley Bridge and Grassington. One mile of the caves have been open to the public for many years, although the entire system is much more extensive than the show caves, extending more than 4 miles (6 km). It has not yet been fully explored.

The system is in a region of limestone extending from Wharfedale to Greenhow and the Craven Fault. Lead has been mined in the region since the era of the Roman Empire.

== History ==
The caves are thought to have been formed around 500,000 years ago, although the process by which they were created began during a much earlier period in which the region was covered by ocean. They were discovered in January 1860 by William and Mark Newbould, who were amongst a group of miners prospecting for lead veins in the Yorkshire Dales. Some sources have given the date of their discovery as 1858. By 1867 1,100 yards (1,000 m) of the caves had been explored.

In 1922 the caves were explored more thoroughly by Christopher Long, a student at Caius College, Cambridge. His discoveries included stalactites in a range of colours, suggesting that they were impregnated with iron and lead. Long claimed that he had also discovered an underground lake, but is said to have sealed its entrance when the caves' owners refused to allow him a share of the revenue generated by tourism to the site.

The caverns were sold in 1926 to Septimus Wray, the owner of the Heysham Head Pleasure Gardens, for £400. He installed his son-in-law, Harry Deane Hornby, to run them on his behalf. Wray's grandson, George Gill, later took over the running of the caves, and installed electric lighting and started to promote the caves as a tourist attraction. Stump Cross developed into a tourist destination in the decades that followed, gaining an information centre, gift shop and a two-bedroomed cottage for the owners.

In 1963 Geoffrey Workman spent 105 days in the caves, a world record, as part of a study on the effects of isolation on the body.

The caves gained Site of Special Scientific Interest designation, and the Reindeer Cave was opened to the public in 2000, forty-five years after it was first discovered. In 2001 the caves were affected by the cleanup of nearby farms during the foot-and-mouth crisis. By 2003 over 60,000 people visited the caves every year. That year the caverns, together with the visitor centre and house, were sold for more than their £675,000 asking price, following the retirement of owner Gordon Hanley, who had acted as a guide at the site since 1961.

The buyer was Richard Bowerman, a brewer, and the caves were subsequently run by Lisa Bowerman. The Bowerman family also part-own the Richmond Brewery Company, which in 2008 released an ale named after Stump Cross. In 2024 ownership of the caves passed to Lisa Bowerman's son, Oliver.

=== C Chamber excavation ===
From 2025, volunteers from the Craven Pothole Club began excavating a chamber, known as C Chamber, which had been discovered in the Victorian era but had remained inaccessible to the public. The work, carried out by hand, involves removing several hundred tonnes of sediment; the operators have stated an aim of opening the chamber to visitors in 2028 as an extension of the show cave.

== Fossils ==
Several fossils have been discovered in the Stump Cross system. The initial discoverers of the caves found four near-complete reindeer fossils and a smaller skeleton believed to be that of an unborn reindeer. These have since been privately restored. Christopher Long's 1922 exploration revealed more prehistoric reindeer bones, and also those of wolverines. The wolverine bones are now on display at the site's visitor centre. Bison remains have also been found.

In February 2026, during the excavation of C Chamber, volunteers uncovered a wolverine jawbone with several teeth intact. According to caver Tom Thompson, the specimen was dated to between 80,000 and 90,000 years old, revised from an initial estimate of about 70,000 years; he described it as the first wolverine remains found at the site since the 1980s. Other remains reported from the caverns include reindeer, bison and Arctic fox bones.
