= Grade I listed churches in Greater Manchester =

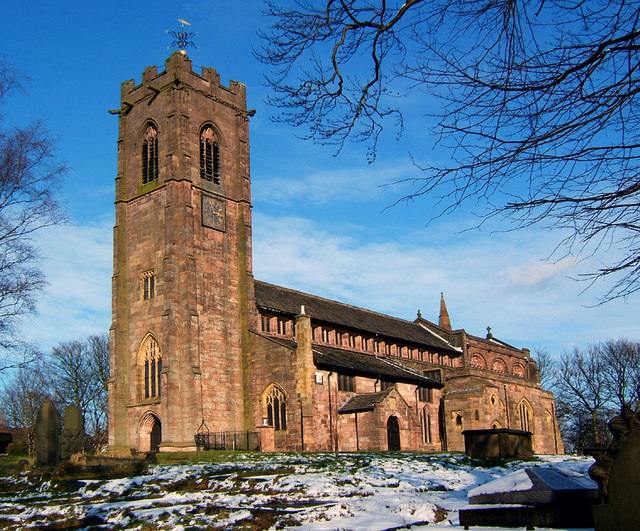
St Mary's Church, Prestwich

Greater Manchester is a metropolitan county in North West England. It was created by the Local Government Act 1972 and consists of the metropolitan boroughs of Bolton, Bury, Oldham, Rochdale, Stockport, Tameside, Trafford, and Wigan, along with the cities of Manchester and Salford. This is a complete list of the Grade I listed churches in the metropolitan county, as recorded in the National Heritage List for England. Buildings are listed by the Secretary of State for Culture, Media and Sport on the recommendation of Historic England. Grade I listed buildings are defined as being of exceptional interest; only around 2.5 per cent of listed buildings fall into this grade.

Christian churches have existed in Greater Manchester since the Anglo-Saxon era, but no significant Saxon features remain in its listed churches, and the only Norman material is to be found in St Leonard's, Middleton. The churches in this list fall into two main groups: those originating mainly from the medieval period, which are in Gothic style, and those built during the 19th and 20th centuries, mainly in Gothic Revival style, with only a few churches created between these periods.

Gothic churches from the medieval era include Manchester Cathedral, St Mary's, Radcliffe, and St Werburgh Old Church, Warburton. Churches from the 19th century include some of the finest works of leading architects of the period: George Gilbert Scott (St Mark's, Worsley), Alfred Waterhouse (St Elisabeth's, Reddish), George Frederick Bodley (St Augustine's, Pendlebury), and Charles Barry (All Saints', Whitefield). Built between these periods was the Neoclassical church of St Ann, Manchester. All the above examples are Anglican churches. There are two Roman Catholic churches in the list—Joseph A. Hansom's Holy Name of Jesus, Manchester, and E. W. Pugin's All Saints', Urmston—and one church built for the Christian Scientists, the Edgar Wood Centre.

Greater Manchester is mainly urban and is one of the most densely populated regions in Europe. In the second half of the 18th century, the Industrial Revolution played an important role in the growth and development of Manchester and its surrounding area, and industry continues to be a major part of the region's economy. Few buildings survive from before the Industrial Revolution, but many date from the 19th and 20th centuries. The bedrock consists mainly of Carboniferous sandstones, including millstone grit, which has been a major source of building material for the region's churches. The superficial deposits are of boulder clay, which provides material for making bricks.

== Churches ==
Name	Location	Photograph	Notes
All Saints	Stand, Whitefield, Bury; 53.5501°N 2.2986°W	An elaborate Gothic Revival church with a west tower and crosketed pinnacles	All Saints was built in 1821–26 as a Commissioners' church. It was designed by Charles Barry, and was his first commission. The church is tall, in a style that has been described as "fanciful" Gothic. Its plan is rectangular, with a canted apse at the east end, and a west tower. Many of the internal furnishings are by Austin and Paley, and one of the monuments is by Sievier.
All Saints	Urmston, Trafford; 53.4734°N 2.3530°W	The west end of a Gothic Revival church with a small doorway, arcading, a large and elaborate rose window, and a narrow bellcote	E. W. Pugin designed this Roman Catholic church, which was built in 1867–68 for Sir Humphrey de Trafford. The building started in 1863 as a family mausoleum, which became church's north chapel. Once a parish church, it has since been used as a friary for the Friars Minor Conventual. At the west end of the church is a large rose window, and a bell-tower with the appearance of a flèche. The church is considered to be E. W. Pugin's masterwork.
Edgar Wood Centre	Rusholme, Manchester; 53.4579°N 2.2162°W	A rendered building with a cross-shaped window at the end, dormers along the sides with a red brick protruding wing and a tower	The first church for the Christian Scientists in Britain, the Edgar Wood Centre was built in 1903–04, with additions in 1905–07. Its design is Expressionist with Art Nouveau details. Constructed in partly rendered brick, it has a steeply pitched roof. The entrance front has a window shaped like a cross, and an entrance under a semicircular arch. There are two wings, one of them in the form of a turret with a conical roof. Along the sides of the church are dormer windows. The building is now used by the Universal Church of the Kingdom of God.
Holy Name of Jesus	Chorlton-on-Medlock, Manchester; 53.4644°N 2.2311°W	The west end of a Gothic Revival church with an elaborate broad tower	This is a Roman Catholic church built in 1869–71, designed by Joseph Aloysius Hansom and his son, Joseph Stanislaus Hansom. The octagonal top of the tower was designed by Adrian Gilbert Scott, and was completed in 1928. The church is constructed in sandstone with slate roofs. Inside the church, terracotta is used for the rib vaulting and for some of the ornamentation. The high altar, pulpit, font and the baptistery screens were designed by the younger Hansom.
Manchester Cathedral	Manchester; 53.4853°N 2.2444°W	Part of the cathedral showing the west tower, south porch, aisle and clerestory, all with openwork parapets and pinnacles	This began as a collegiate church in 1421, and became a cathedral in 1847. It was constructed in sandstone, mainly in the 15th and 16th centuries, and is in the Perpendicular style. A series of restorations was carried out in the 19th century by John Palmer, by J. P. Holden, who raised the height of the tower, by J. S. Crowther, who rebuilt the nave arcades, and by Basil Champneys, who added the west porch. The cathedral was bomb-damaged in 1940, and was subsequently repaired by Hubert Worthington.
St Ann	Manchester; 53.4817°N 2.2458°W	Part of a Neoclassical church showing the west end of the nave, and the tower with its balustraded parapet	St Ann's was built in 1709–12 in Neoclassical style. It consists of a six-bay nave, with a semicircular apse at the east end, and a west tower. The tower originally had a three-stage cupola, which was removed in 1777 and replaced with a balustraded parapet. The church was remodelled and restored by Alfred Waterhouse in 1887–91. Inside are galleries on three sides, supported by Tuscan columns. The stained glass scheme in the apse was designed by Frederic Shields.
St Anne	Haughton, Denton, Tameside; 53.4461°N 2.1044°W	A cruciform church with a central tower with a spire and steeply pitched red tile roofs	The church was built in 1880–82, and designed by J. Medland Taylor and Henry Taylor for Joseph Sidebotham, a local industrialist and politician. It is constructed in red brick with tiled roofs, and has a cruciform plan. Over the crossing is a large tower consisting of a truncated pyramidal roof, above which is a timber-framed bell stage with a pyramidal spire containing dormer openings. The marguerite, a symbol of Saint Anne, features prominently in the decorative scheme.
St Augustine	Pendlebury, Salford; 53.5111°N 2.3219°W	A red brick Gothic Revival church without a tower, but with small gables projections along the edge of the roof	G. F. Bodley designed the church for the Manchester banker Edward Stanley Heywood. It was built in 1870–74 on a concrete raft to prevent damage from mining subsidence, and cost £33,000. The church is constructed in brick with stone dressings and tiled roofs. The buttresses are internal; they rise through the roof, and are capped by small gables. Many of the internal furnishings were designed by Bodley, including the large and elaborate reredos. On the chancel walls are paintings and stencilling.
St Edmund	Rochdale; 53.6209°N 2.1658°W	A Gothic tower projecting above rooftops, with a taller spired stair turret	The church was built in 1870–73, and designed by J. Medland Taylor for Albert Hudson Royds, a local banker and prominent Freemason. It is constructed in sandstone with tiled roofs, at a cost of £28,000. The church has a cruciform plan with a tower at the crossing. It is notable for its combination of Gothic Revival architectural features with symbols of Freemasonry. The church closed in 2009, and is under the care of the Churches Conservation Trust.
St Elisabeth	Reddish, Stockport; 53.4380°N 2.1633°W	A Gothic Revival church in red brick with stone bands and an almost separate south tower surmounted by a lead-covered spire	Designed by Alfred Waterhouse, the church was built in 1882–83 for Sir William Houldsworth. It is constructed in red brick with stone bands and dressings. Outside the east end of the south aisle is a tower linked to the body of the church by a flying bridge; the tower is surmounted by a lead spire. At the east end of the church is an apsidal chancel flanked by a Lady chapel and a vestry.
St George	Heaviley, Stockport; 53.3972°N 2.1518°W	An elaborate Gothic Revival church seen from the west, with a central tower surmounted by a tall spire	St George's was built between 1893 and 1897, and designed by Hubert Austin of the Lancaster architectural practice of Paley, Austin and Paley. It is Perpendicular in style, with some Art Nouveau features. The church has a tower at the crossing, surmounted by a spire rising to 236 feet (72 m). It is described by the authors of the Buildings of England series as "by far the grandest church of Stockport".
St Leonard	Middleton, Rochdale; 53.5532°N 2.1945°W	A battlemented Gothic church with a west tower surmounted by a weatherboarded belfry	The church stands on a hill, and contains some Norman material in the tower arch. It was rebuilt in 1412 by Bishop Thomas Langley, with a further rebuilding in 1524 by Sir Richard Assheton. There were more alterations carried out in the 17th and 19th centuries. Between 1957 and 1960, George Pace added vestries and a porch. A notable feature of the church is the weatherboarded belfry, dating from 1667, on the tower.
St Mark	Worsley, Salford; 53.5028°N 2.3837°W	A large Gothic Revival church with an elaborate west tower surmounted by a spire supported by flying buttresses	St Mark's was designed by George Gilbert Scott for Francis Egerton, 1st Earl of Ellesmere, and built in 1845–46. The north aisle was added in 1851. Its architectural style is Gothic Revival of the 14th century. The west steeple has a recessed spire with flying buttresses, and is decorated with crockets, gargoyles and lucarnes. Inside the church, the elaborate pulpit and organ case incorporate 17th-century carved French and Flemish panels. Also in the church is a monument to Egerton, designed by Scott, with an effigy by Matthew Noble.
St Mary	Cheadle, Stockport; 53.3942°N 2.2175°W	A Gothic church with a battlemented clerestory and west tower	St Mary's dates mainly from between 1520 and 1550, and is entirely Perpendicular in style. There were restorations in the 19th century, including one by J. Medland Taylor in 1878–80. At the west end is a castellated tower. Inside the church is a camber beam roof with gilded bosses. The church also contains effigies dating from the 15th and 17th centuries.
St Mary	Radcliffe, Bury; 53.5644°N 2.3081°W	A Gothic church with a squat west tower and a clerestory with large rectangular windows	The church dates from the 14th century. The tower is probably from the following century, and was restored in 1665. The chancel was rebuilt in 1817. J. Medland Taylor carried out restorations and extensions in 1870 and 1905; these included replacing the south transept with an aisle, giving the church an almost square plan.
St Mary	Stockport; 53.4112°N 2.1555°W	A Gothic church with elaborate pinnacles on the body of the church and on the west tower	The chancel and the northeast chapel date from the 14th century, and are in Decorated style. The rest of the church was rebuilt between 1813 and 1817 in Perpendicular style. Alterations were made in 1881–82 by J. S. Crowther. In the chancel are a sedilia, a double piscina and an Easter Sepulchre, and there is another piscina in the chapel. Also in the church are a number of monuments, including one by Richard Westmacott.
St Mary in the Baum	Rochdale; 53.6188°N 2.1585°W		The church, opened in 1909, was designed by Ninian Comper as a cheaper alternative to repairing the previous chapel-of-ease of 1742. The unusual name derives from the medicinal herbs (balm/locally baum, possibly lemon balm or white mint) which grew wild in the area.
St Mary the Virgin	Eccles, Salford; 53.4839°N 2.3334°W	A Gothic church with a transept, clerestory, and west tower, all battlemented	The oldest fabric in the church dates from the 13th century. There were alterations and additions in each of the following three centuries, particularly in the 15th century. The chancel was rebuilt in 1862–63 by J. P. Holden. The roof of the nave has been described as "the chief treasure of the church"; it is coffered, and decorated with elaborate bosses, some with sunbursts.
St Mary the Virgin	Prestwich, Bury; 53.5294°N 2.2866°W	A red sandstone church with a tall battlemented west tower	A church has been present on the site since at least 1200, but the oldest part of the present church is the tower, which dates from the 15th century. The nave and aisles are from the following century. The south porch was added in 1865, followed by two chapels in 1874–75. In 1888–89, Paley, Austin and Paley replaced the chancel, added a turret at the east end, and rebuilt the north chapel. The same architects also designed many of the internal furnishings. Among the monuments is one by Sievier.
St Michael and All Angels	Ashton-under-Lyne, Tameside; 53.4877°N 2.0897°W	A Gothic church with a tall west tower surmounted by a complex parapet and pinnacles	The church originated in the 15th century, but was virtually rebuilt during the 19th century. The north side was partly rebuilt in 1821. Between 1841 and 1845 Richard Tattersall rebuilt the south wall, and restored the internal piers, pews and galleries. In 1886–88 J. S. Crowther built the west tower. The church is mainly in the Perpendicular style. Twenty of the windows contain medieval stained glass dating from about 1497 to 1512, donated by Sir Thomas Assheton, and depicting scenes from the life of Saint Helen.
St Thomas	Stockport; 53.4036°N 2.1550°W	A Neoclassical church with a portico supported by six columns, and clock tower surmounted by an open lantern with columns	This was a Commissioners' church and an early design by George Basevi. It is in Greek Revival style. At the east end is a large portico supported by six Ionic columns, and at the west end is a clock tower. The church was refurbished by T. H. Allen in 1881, and the chancel was remodelled by J. Medland Taylor in 1890. Inside the church are galleries on three sides, carried on Corinthian columns.
St Werburgh Old Church	Warburton, Trafford; 53.4021°N 2.4573°W	A plain brick tower with round-headed doorway and bell openings, a round window, and small plain pinnacles	This is basically a timber-framed church, but some parts are in stone, and others are in brick. The west front and south aisle are dated 1645, although some parts are probably older, and the brick tower at the east end is dated 1711. There have been more alterations since. Inside the church is a font dated 1603, a Jacobean pulpit, and a three-sided communion rail dating from the 17th century. The church is now redundant and under the care of the Churches Conservation Trust.
St Wilfrid	Standish, Wigan; 53.5868°N 2.6625°W	The west end of a Gothic church showing its stepple with a square lower stage, octagonal belfry stage surmounted by a spire	St Wilfrid's dates mainly from about 1582–84 when it largely replaced an earlier church. A new tower was added in 1867. In 1913–14 the east vestry was built by Austin and Paley. The west tower has an octagonal bell stage. Inside the church the arcades are supported by Tuscan columns, probably the earliest full-scale use of the Tuscan order in England. The church also contains a piscina and aumbry dating from the 13th or 14th century, and 14th-century monuments.
