= Grade I listed buildings in Greater Manchester =

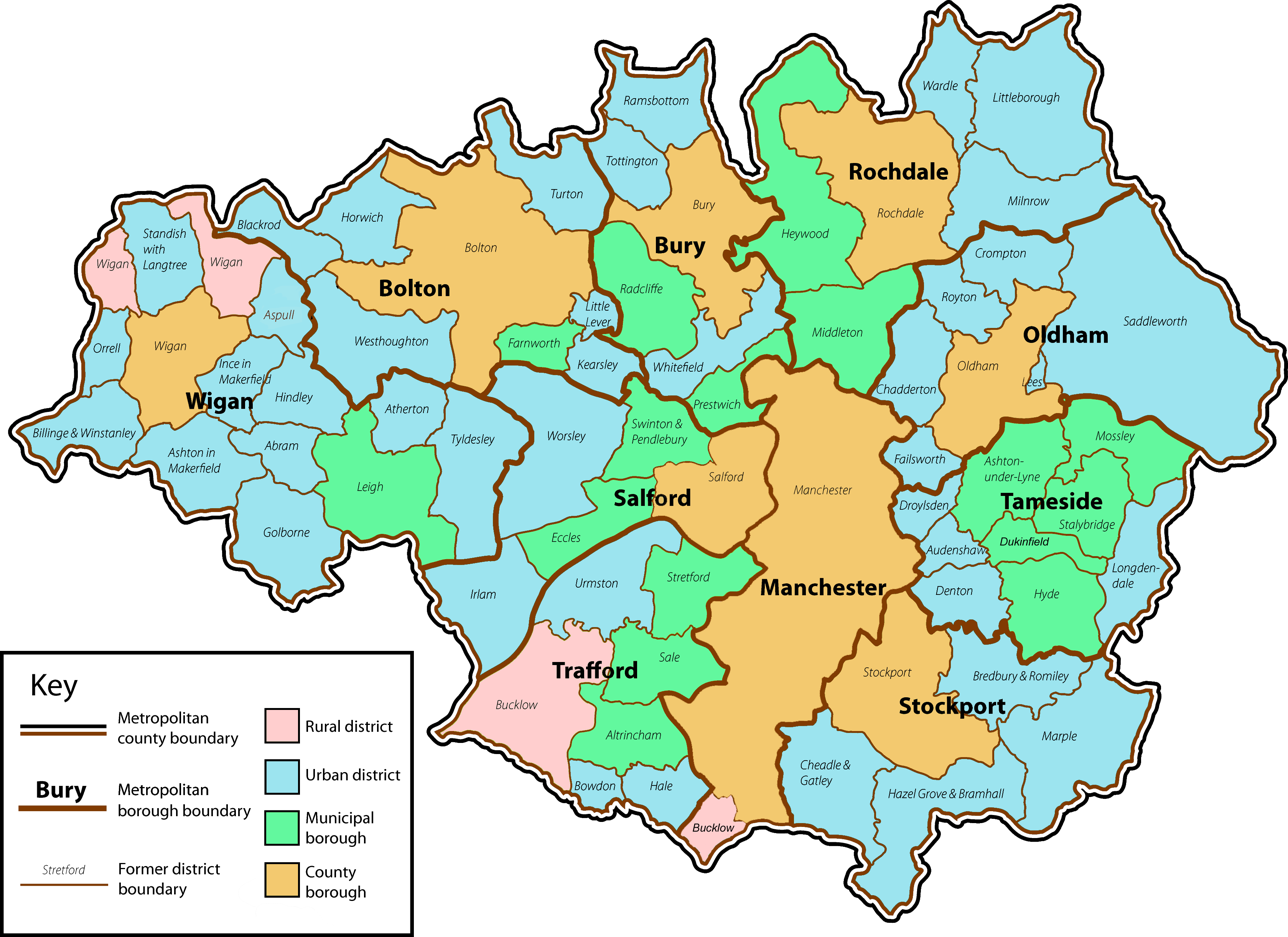
The metropolitan county of Greater Manchester, divided into ten metropolitan boroughs

There are 49 Grade I listed buildings in Greater Manchester, England. In the United Kingdom, the term listed building refers to a building or other structure officially designated as being of special architectural or historic interest. Grade I structures are those considered to be of exceptional interest. In England, the authority for listing under the Planning (Listed Buildings and Conservation Areas) Act 1990 rests with the Secretary of State for Culture, Media and Sport, advised by Historic England, a non-departmental public body sponsored by the Department for Culture, Media and Sport.

The metropolitan county of Greater Manchester comprises 10 metropolitan boroughs: Bolton, Bury, Manchester, Oldham, Rochdale, Salford, Stockport, Tameside, Trafford and Wigan. Manchester, the world's first industrialised city, contains 15 of Greater Manchester's 49 Grade I listed buildings, the highest number of any borough. Oldham is the only borough to have no listed buildings with a Grade I rating. The River Irwell forms the boundary between Manchester and Salford, and one listed structure—the River Irwell Railway Bridge—appears under both cities. This duplication is reflected in the official total of 49 Grade I listed buildings.

Most of Greater Manchester's listed buildings date from the Victorian and Edwardian periods. According to an Association for Industrial Archaeology publication, Greater Manchester is "one of the classic areas of industrial and urban growth in Britain, the result of a combination of forces that came together in the 18th and 19th centuries: a phenomenal rise in population, the appearance of the specialist industrial town, a transport revolution, and weak local lordship". Much of the region, historically a part of Lancashire, was at the forefront of textile manufacturing from the early 19th century until the early 20th century, and the county includes several former mill towns. Greater Manchester has a wealth of industrial heritage, represented by industrial architecture found throughout the county, but most of its Grade I listed buildings have a municipal, ecclesiastic or other cultural heritage.

The oldest Grade I listed structure in Greater Manchester is the Parish Church of St Mary the Virgin in Eccles, completed in the 13th century but greatly expanded since then. There are eight listed manor houses, the earliest of which date from the 14th century; Wardley Hall, still in use today as the residence of the Roman Catholic Bishop of Salford, has the preserved skull of St Ambrose Barlow – one of the Forty Martyrs of England and Wales – on display in a niche at the top of the main staircase. Three buildings are attributed to engineer George Stephenson. One of them, Liverpool Road railway station, is the oldest surviving railway station in the world. The newest Grade I listed building in Greater Manchester is Royd House, built and designed by Edgar Wood in 1916 as his residence. Twenty-two buildings, almost half of the total, were completed in the 19th century.

== Bolton ==
Grade I listed buildings in Bolton
Name	Location	Type	Architect	Completed (Note: The date given is the date used by Historic England as significant for the initial building or that of an important part in the structure's description.)	Date designated	Grid ref. (Note: The grid reference is based on the British national grid reference system, sometimes known as OSGB36, used by the Ordnance Survey.) Geo-coordinates	Entry number (Note: The "List Entry Number" is a unique number assigned to each listed building and scheduled monument by Historic England.)	Image	Ref.
Smithills Hall	Smithills Dean Road, Bolton	House		14th century	23 April 1952	SD6994611871; 53°36′09″N 2°27′20″W	1388279	Smithills Hall More images	
10 Firwood Fold	Firwood Fold, Bolton	House		c. 16th century (probably)	23 April 1952	SD7587503385; 53°35′45″N 2°24′22″W	1388038	10 Firwood Fold More images	
Hall i' th' Wood	Hall i' th' Wood Lane, Bolton	House		16th century	23 April 1952	SD6994611871; 53°36′09″N 2°27′20″W	1388279	Hall i' th' Wood More images	

== Bury ==
Grade I listed buildings in Bury
Name	Location	Type	Architect	Completed	Date designated	Grid ref. Geo-coordinates	Entry number	Image	Ref.
Church of St Mary and St Bartholomew	Church Green, Radcliffe	Church		14th century	29 July 1966	SD7969107580; 53°33′52″N 2°18′29″W	1163125	Church of St Mary and St Bartholomew More images	
Radcliffe Tower	Church Street East, Radcliffe	House		1403	29 July 1966	SD7957607508; 53°33′50″N 2°18′35″W	1309271	Radcliffe Tower More images	
Church of St Mary	Church Lane, Prestwich	Church		15th century	30 June 1966	SD8110003664; 53°31′45″N 2°17′12″W	1067252	Church of St Mary More images	
All Saints' Church	Church Lane, Whitefield	Church	Charles Barry	1826	15 August 1966	SD8031605987; 53°33′01″N 2°17′55″W	1356818	All Saints' Church More images	
Parish Church of St Mary	The Rock, Bury	Church	J. S. Crowther	1876	13 July 2006	SD8033810889; 53°35′38″N 2°17′50″W	1067236	Parish Church of St Mary More images	

== Manchester ==
Grade I listed buildings in Manchester
Name	Location	Type	Architect	Completed	Date designated	Grid ref. Geo-coordinates	Entry number	Image	Ref.
Baguley Hall	Hall Lane, Baguley	House		14th century (probably)	25 February 1952	SJ8162088736; 53°23′42″N 2°16′40″W	1291962	Baguley Hall More images	
Chetham's Hospital and attached wall	Long Millgate, City centre	College		1422 (established)	25 February 1952	SJ8390198895; 53°29′11″N 2°14′39″W	1283015	Chetham's Hospital and attached wall More images	
Manchester Cathedral	Fennel Street, City centre	Cathedral		c. 1422–1520 (mostly)	25 January 1952	SJ8388198750; 53°29′07″N 2°14′40″W	1218041	Manchester Cathedral More images	
St Ann's Church	St Ann's Square, City centre	Church	Christopher Wren (by tradition)	1712	25 February 1952	SJ8378498354; 53°28′54″N 2°14′45″W	1247612	St Ann's Church More images	
Heaton Hall	Heaton Park, Prestwich	House	James Wyatt	1789	25 February 1952	SD8331904422; 53°32′10″N 2°15′11″W	1200809	Heaton Hall More images	
1830 warehouse, Liverpool Road railway station	Liverpool Road, City centre	Warehouse	Thomas Haigh	c. 1830	8 May 1973	SJ8299097886; 53°28′39″N 2°15′28″W	1282991	1830 warehouse, Liverpool Road railway station More images	
Liverpool Road railway station	Liverpool Road, City centre	Railway station	George Stephenson	1830	18 December 1963	SJ8289197915; 53°28′40″N 2°15′33″W	1291477	Liverpool Road railway station More images	
River Irwell Railway Bridge	Water Street, City centre	Bridge	George Stephenson	1830	20 June 1988	SJ8289197915; 53°28′40″N 2°15′33″W	1270603	River Irwell Railway Bridge More images	
Manchester Art Gallery	Mosley Street, City centre	Art gallery	Charles Barry	1835	25 February 1952	SJ8406198025; 53°28′43″N 2°14′30″W	1282980	Manchester Art Gallery More images	
Former Bank of England	King Street, City centre	Bank	Charles Robert Cockerell	1846	25 February 1952	SJ8390798254; 53°28′51″N 2°14′38″W	1291596	Former Bank of England More images	
Albert Memorial	Albert Square	Memorial	Thomas Worthington	1862–1865	18 December 1963	SJ8382298116; 53°28′46″N 2°14′43″W	1197820	Albert Memorial More images	
Church of the Holy Name of Jesus	Oxford Road, Chorlton-on-Medlock	Church	Joseph Hansom	1867–1871 by Hansom; completed 1928 by A. G. Scott	18 December 1963	SJ8475796438; 53°27′52″N 2°13′52″W	1271296	Church of the Holy Name of Jesus More images	
Manchester Town Hall	Albert Square	Town hall	Alfred Waterhouse	1877	25 February 1952	SJ8386798089; 53°28′45″N 2°14′40″W	1207469	Manchester Town Hall More images	
John Rylands Library	Deansgate	Library	Basil Champneys	1899	25 January 1952	SJ8356898213; 53°28′49″N 2°14′57″W	1217800	John Rylands Library More images	
Former First Church of Christ, Scientist	Daisy Bank Road, Rusholme	Church	Edgar Wood	1903	18 December 1963	SJ8572995702; 53°27′28″N 2°12′59″W	1197770	Former First Church of Christ, Scientist More images	

== Rochdale ==
Grade I listed buildings in Rochdale
Name	Location	Type	Architect	Completed	Date designated	Grid ref. Geo-coordinates	Entry number	Image	Ref.
Church of St Leonard	New Lane, Middleton	Church		1524	15 March 1957	SD8720806307; 53°33′12″N 2°11′40″W	1162332	Church of St Leonard More images	
Rochdale Town Hall	The Esplanade, Rochdale	Town hall	Alfred Waterhouse	1871	25 October 1951	SD8958413253; 53°36′57″N 2°09′32″W	1084275	Rochdale Town Hall More images	
Church of St Edmund	Edmund Street, Rochdale	Church	James Medland and Henry Taylor	1873	12 February 1985	SD8913213832; 53°37′15″N 2°09′57″W	1084273	Church of St Edmund More images	
Church of St Mary-in-the-Baum	St Mary's Gate, Rochdale	Church	Ninian Comper	1911	3 December 1975	SD813965; 53°49′01″N 2°09′31″W	1025294	Church of St Mary-in-the-Baum More images	
Rochdale Cenotaph	The Esplanade, Rochdale	Memorial	Edwin Lutyens	1922	12 February 1985 (upgraded 28 October 2015)	SD8953013314	1084274	Rochdale Cenotaph More images	

== Salford ==
Grade I listed buildings in Salford
Name	Location	Type	Architect	Completed	Date designated	Grid ref. Geo-coordinates	Entry number	Image	Ref.
Church of St Mary	Church Street, Eccles	Church		13th century	24 February 1964	SJ7789498669; 53°29′03″N 2°20′05″W	1067498	Church of St Mary More images	
Wardley Hall	Wardley Hall Road, Wardley	House		c. 1500	29 July 1966	SD7456600695; 53°31′35″N 2°21′50″W	1215022	Wardley Hall More images	
Ordsall Hall	Taylorson Street, Ordsall	House		16th century	31 January 1952	SJ8167196987; 53°28′09″N 2°16′39″W	1386169	Ordsall Hall More images	
River Irwell Railway Bridge	Water Street, Salford	Bridge	George Stephenson	1830	20 February 2007	SJ8282897950; 53°28′41″N 2°15′37″W	1270603	River Irwell Railway Bridge More images	
St Mark's Church	Worsley Brow, Worsley	Church	George Gilbert Scott	1846	29 July 1966	SD7456600695; 53°30′07″N 2°23′06″W	1227895	St Mark's Church More images	
St Augustine's Church	Bolton Road, Pendlebury	Church	George Frederick Bodley	1874	30 March 1966	SD7871901606; 53°30′39″N 2°19′21″W	1067508	St Augustine's Church More images	

== Stockport ==
Grade I listed buildings in Stockport
Name	Location	Type	Architect	Completed	Date designated	Grid ref. Geo-coordinates	Entry number	Image	Ref.
Bramall Hall	Bramhall Park, Bramhall	House		14th century	9 August 1966	SJ8901386363; 53°22′26″N 2°10′00″W	1260476	Bramall Hall More images	
St Mary's Church	High Street, Cheadle	Church		1520–1550 (mainly)	24 March 1950	SJ8563588616; 53°23′39″N 2°13′03″W	1241643	St Mary's Church More images	
Marple Aqueduct	Marple	Aqueduct	Benjamin Outram and Thomas Brown	1794–1801	29 March 1966	SJ9552190052; 53°24′26″N 2°04′08″W	1242267	Marple Aqueduct More images	
Parish Church of St Mary	Churchgate, Stockport	Church	Lewis Wyatt	1817	14 May 1952	SJ8977890502; 53°24′40″N 2°09′19″W	1309701	Parish Church of St Mary More images	
St Elisabeth's Church	Leamington Road, Reddish	Church	Alfred Waterhouse	1883	30 October 1973	SJ8924993476; 53°26′17″N 2°09′48″W	1356851	St Elisabeth's Church More images	
Church of St George	Buxton Road, Heaviley	Church	Hubert Austin and Edward Graham Paley	1897	10 March 1975		1067194	Church of St George More images	
Parish Church of St Thomas	St Thomas' Place, Stockport	Church	George Basevi	1897	14 May 1952	SJ8979089648; 53°24′13″N 2°09′18″W	1067160	Parish Church of St Thomas More images	

== Tameside ==
Grade I listed buildings in Tameside
Name	Location	Type	Architect	Completed	Date designated	Grid ref. Geo-coordinates	Entry number	Image	Ref.
St Michael and All Angels' Church	Stamford Street, Ashton-under-Lyne	Church		15th century	12 January 1967	SJ9414098997; 53°29′16″N 2°05′23″W	1162800	St Michael and All Angels' Church More images	
St Anne's Church	St Anne's Road, Denton	Church	J. Medland Taylor	1881	20 July 1977	SJ9337895584; 53°27′25″N 2°06′04″W	1309251	St Anne's Church More images	

== Trafford ==
Grade I listed buildings in Trafford
Name	Location	Type	Architect	Completed	Date designated	Grid ref. Geo-coordinates	Entry number	Image	Ref.
Old Church of St Werburg	Wigsey Lane, Warburton	Church		c. 14th century	5 March 1959	SJ6969489576; 53°24′08″N 2°27′26″W	1067865	Old Church of St Werburg More images	
Dunham Massey carriage house	Dunham Massey	House		1721	5 March 1959	SJ7344487349; 53°22′56″N 2°24′03″W	1067942	Dunham Massey carriage house More images	
Dunham Massey stables (south of hall)	Dunham Massey	Stables		1721	12 July 1985	SJ7346287303; 53°22′55″N 2°24′02″W	1356495	Dunham Massey stables (south of hall) More images	
Dunham Hall	Dunham Massey	House		1732–1740	5 March 1959	SJ7348887422; 53°22′59″N 2°24′00″W	1356512	Dunham Hall More images	
All Saints' Church	Redclyffe Road, Urmston	Church	E. W. Pugin	1867–68	9 May 1978	SJ7666897467; 53°28′24″N 2°21′11″W	1067879	All Saints' Church More images	
Royd House	Hale Road, Hale	House	Edgar Wood	1916	13 October 1975	SJ7834886681; 53°22′36″N 2°19′37″W	1067922	Royd House More images	

== Wigan ==
Grade I listed buildings in Wigan
Name	Location	Type	Architect	Completed	Date designated	Grid ref. Geo-coordinates	Entry number	Image	Ref.
Church of St Wilfrid	Market Place, Standish	Church	L. Shipway (probable)	1584	9 August 1966	SD5631810265; 53°35′14″N 2°39′41″W	1287160	Church of St Wilfrid More images	

== Total Grade I listed buildings by borough ==
The table shows the total number of Grade I listed buildings by borough. Although the borough totals sum to 50, the River Irwell Railway Bridge is listed under both Manchester and Salford, so the official total in the National Heritage List for England is 49.

Total Grade I listed buildings by borough
Borough	Grade I listed buildings
Bolton	3
Bury	5
Manchester	15
Oldham	—
Rochdale	5
Salford	6
Stockport	7
Tameside	2
Trafford	6
Wigan	1
Total	50

== See also ==
- Architecture of Manchester
- Conservation in the United Kingdom
- Grade II listed buildings in Manchester
- Grade II* listed buildings in Greater Manchester
- List of tallest buildings in Manchester
- Scheduled monuments in Greater Manchester
