= 10 Firwood Fold =

Listed building in Greater Manchester, England

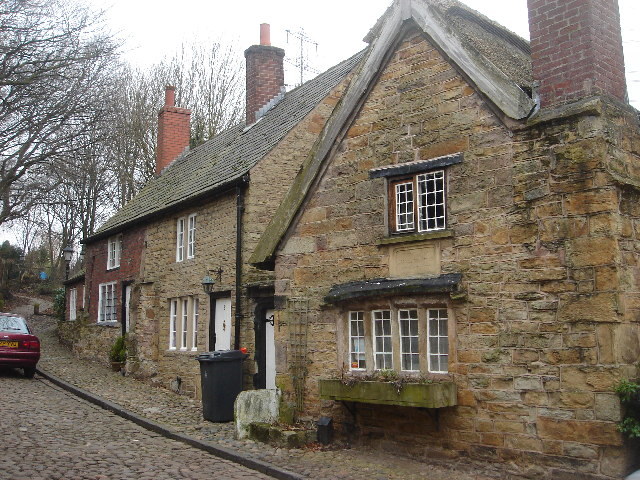
- 10 Firwood Fold

- Location within Greater Manchester

General information
- Location: Bolton, Greater Manchester, England
- Coordinates: 53.595517°N 2.405319°W
- Completed: 16th century

Design and construction
- Designations

Listed Building – Grade I
- Official name: 10, Firwood Fold
- Designated: 22 April 1952
- Reference no.: 1388038

10 Firwood Fold is a 16th-century house in Bolton, Greater Manchester, England. It is a Grade I listed building and was the birthplace of English inventor Samuel Crompton in 1753.

The Crompton family lived in the house until 1758, making a living from farming and weaving, before moving to rented quarters at nearby Hall i' th' Wood.

In 1969 the hamlet of Firwood Fold was designated Bolton's first conservation area, ensuring protection of its historic character. The unified appearance of the hamlet—simple style, local stone, and modest scale—has been preserved despite centuries of change.

== Gallery ==
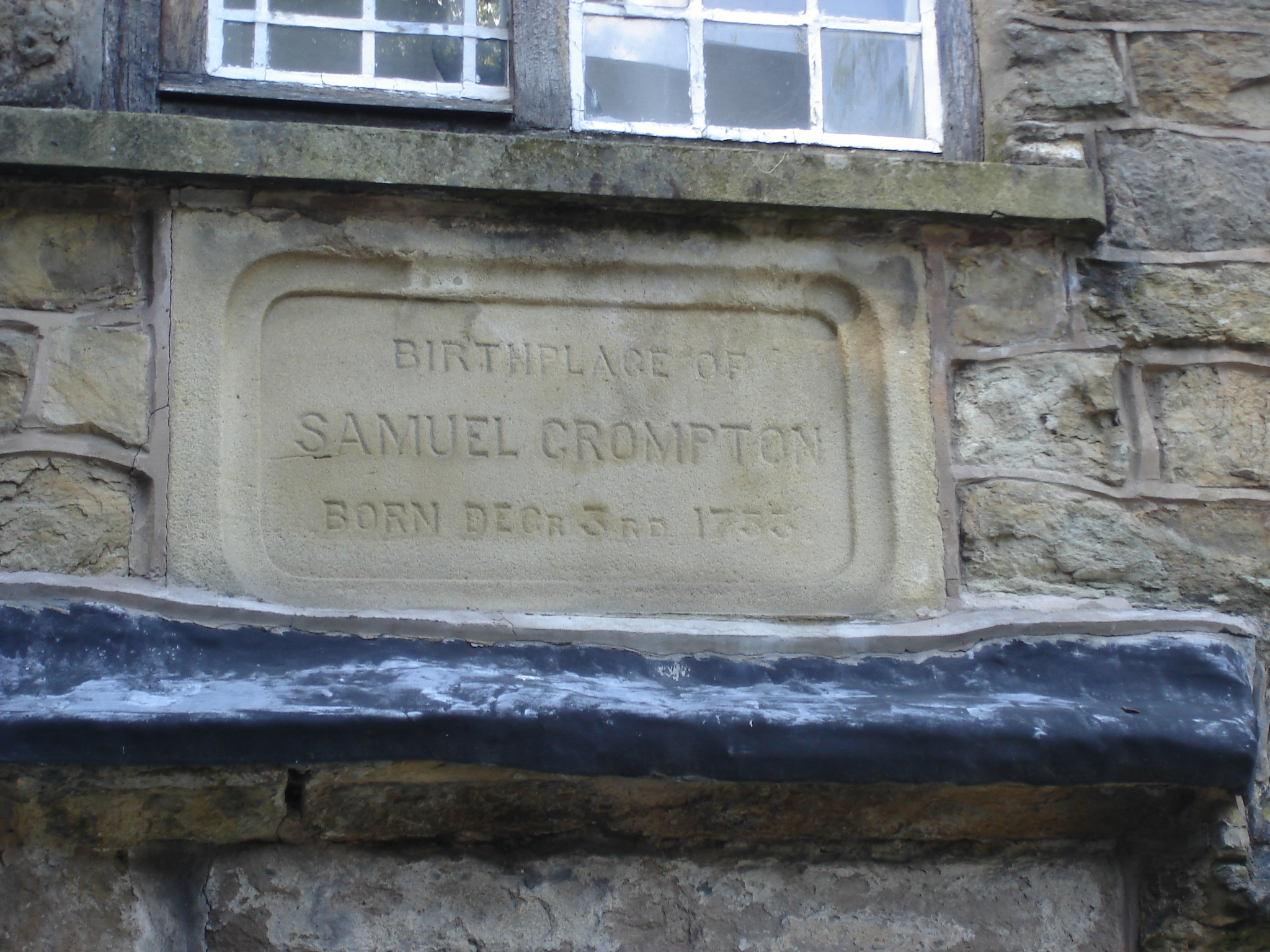
Stone panel in 10 Firwood Fold announcing that Samuel Crompton was born in the house on 3 December 1753.

== See also ==
- 15 Firwood Fold, a Grade II* listed building in the hamlet
- Grade I listed buildings in Greater Manchester
- Listed buildings in Bolton
