= St George's Church, Heaviley =

Church in Greater Manchester, England

Coordinates: 53.3972°N 2.1518°W

St George's Church
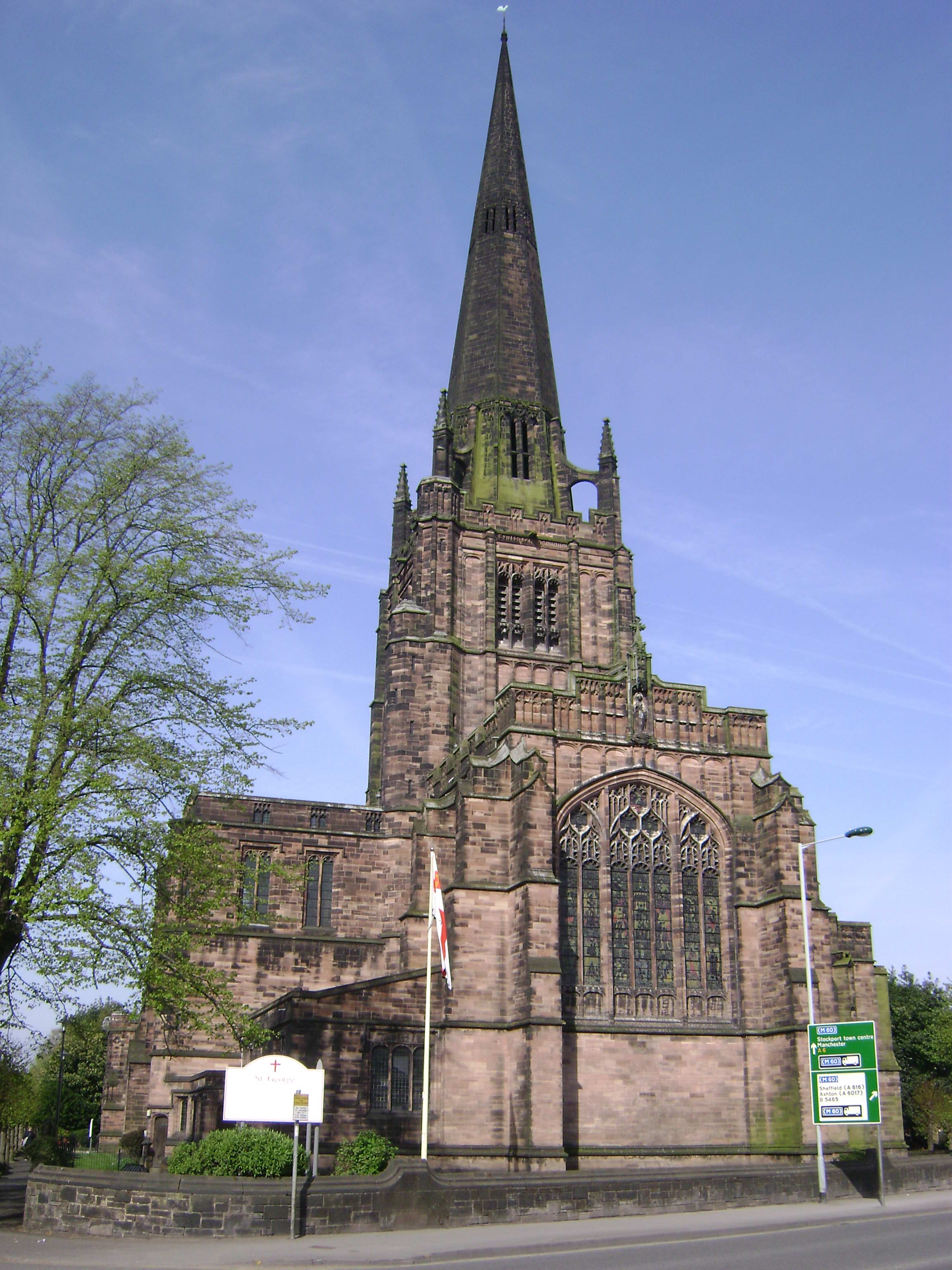
- St George's Church in 2009, from the east

- Location in Greater Manchester
- OS grid reference: SJ 900,889
- Location: Buxton Road, Heaviley, Stockport, Greater Manchester
- Country: England
- Denomination: Anglican
- Website: stgeorgestockport.org.uk

History
- Status: Parish church
- Dedication: Saint George
- Consecrated: 25 February 1897

Architecture
- Functional status: Active
- Heritage designation: Grade I
- Designated: 10 March 1975
- Architect: Hubert Austin
- Architectural type: Church
- Style: Gothic Revival
- Groundbreaking: 1893
- Completed: 1897

Specifications
- Capacity: 1,401
- Length: 180 feet (55 m)
- Width: 75 feet (23 m)
- Materials: Runcorn sandstone

Administration
- Province: York
- Diocese: Chester
- Archdeaconry: Macclesfield
- Deanery: Stockport
- Parish: Stockport, Saint George

Clergy
- Vicar: Revd Canon Elaine Chegwin Hall

St George's Church is in Buxton Road, Heaviley, an area of Stockport, Greater Manchester, England. It is an active Anglican parish church in the deanery of Stockport, the archdeaconry of Macclesfield, and the Diocese of Chester. Its benefice is united with that of St Gabriel, Adswood. The church is recorded in the National Heritage List for England (NHLE) as a designated Grade I listed building. The authors of the Buildings of England series express the opinion that it is "by far the grandest church of Stockport", and state "St George is a church on a splendid scale". According to the visitors' guide to the church, the Rt Revd Geoffrey Fisher, former Archbishop of Canterbury, said that it is "the finest church built in England since the Reformation".

== History ==
The foundation stone was laid in 1893, and the church was consecrated on 25 February 1897. It was designed by Hubert Austin of the Lancaster architectural practice of Paley, Austin and Paley. The church forms part of a group of buildings, also including the vicarage and schools, that were paid for by George Fearn, a local brewer. The total cost of the church and its associated buildings is said to have been nearly £80,000 (equivalent to £8,990,000 in 2025).

== Architecture ==
=== Exterior ===
The church is constructed in Runcorn red sandstone. Its architectural style is Perpendicular, with "traces of Art Nouveau". Its plan consists of a six-bay nave with a clerestory, north and south aisles, north and south porches, a tower at the crossing, and a chancel and sanctuary with a lady chapel to the north, an organ chamber to the south, and a vestry to the southeast. The tower has an embattled parapet with corner pinnacles linked by flying buttresses to the spire. At the east end, flanking the windows, are large buttresses. The east and west windows have seven lights, and the windows along the sides of the nave have four lights. The church is 180 feet (55 m) long and 75 feet (23 m) wide, the tower is 112 feet (34 m) high, and with the spire raises to 236 feet (72 m).

=== Interior ===
The reredos is made from Derbyshire alabaster. It contains three carved panels, the central one depicting the Crucifixion, and the others the Virgin Mary and Saint John. The font is also of Derbyshire alabaster, and is carved with foliage. Both were carved by Robert Bridgeman of Lichfield. The pulpit contains six niches containing the figures of Saint Paul, Saint Matthew, Saint Mark, Saint Luke, Saint John, and Saint Peter. The lectern consists of a brass eagle standing on a pedestal supported by lions. The Lady Chapel is separated from the chancel by a carved oak screen, and contains a carved oak reredos including the figures of Saint John the Divine and Saint John the Baptist. There is stained glass only in the east and west windows, and in one window in the south aisle; it is all by Shrigley and Hunt. The east window includes a depiction of Saint George and the Dragon. The three-manual organ was built in 1897 by Forster and Andrews at a cost of £1,710 (equivalent to £190,000 in 2025). It was rebuilt in 1936 by the John Compton Organ Company. Further work was carried out on the organ in 1981 by Rushworth and Dreaper. The organ case was designed by Austin. There is a ring of ten bells, all of which were cast in 1896 by Mears and Stainbank at the Whitechapel Bell Foundry.

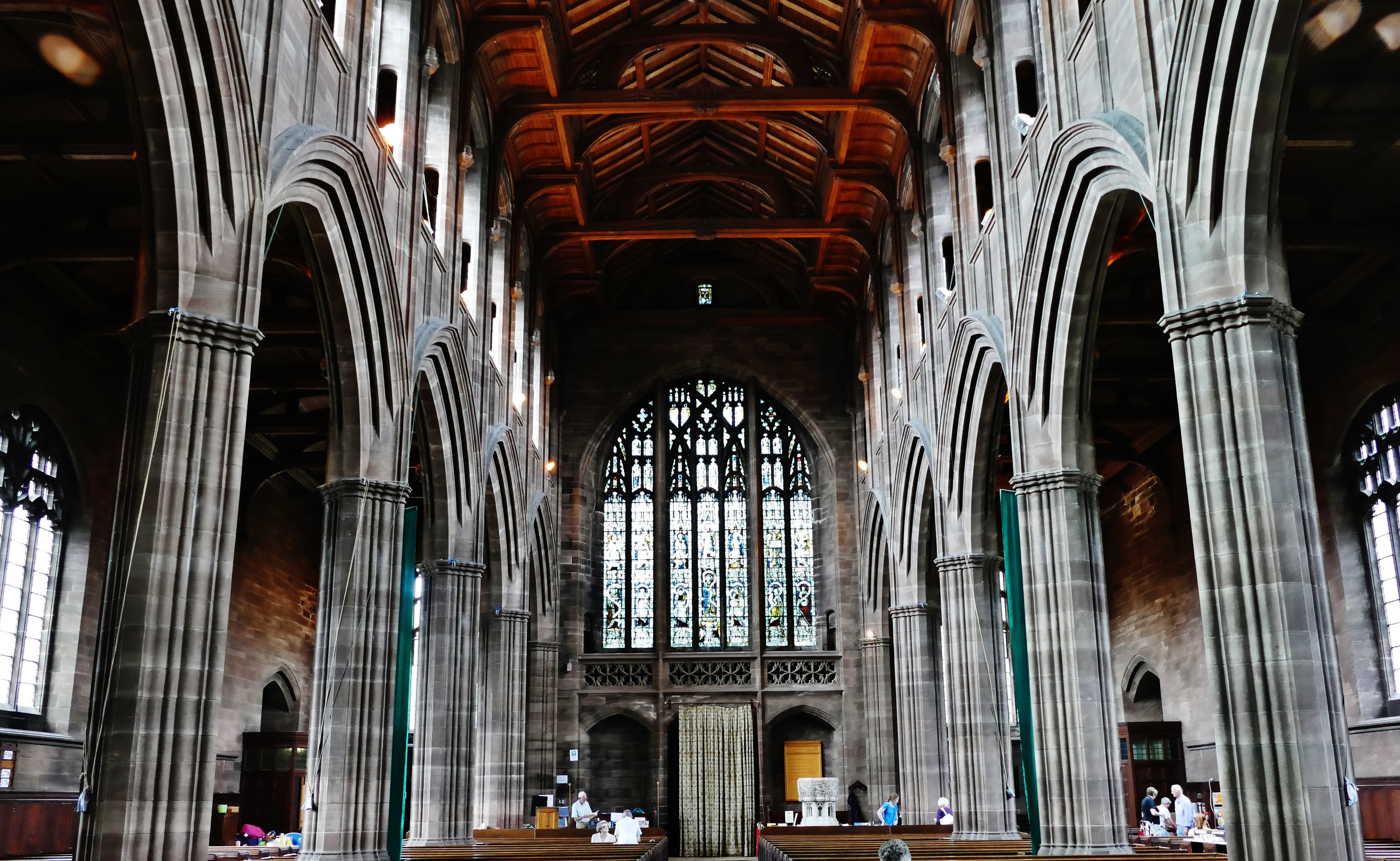
Nave and roof detail

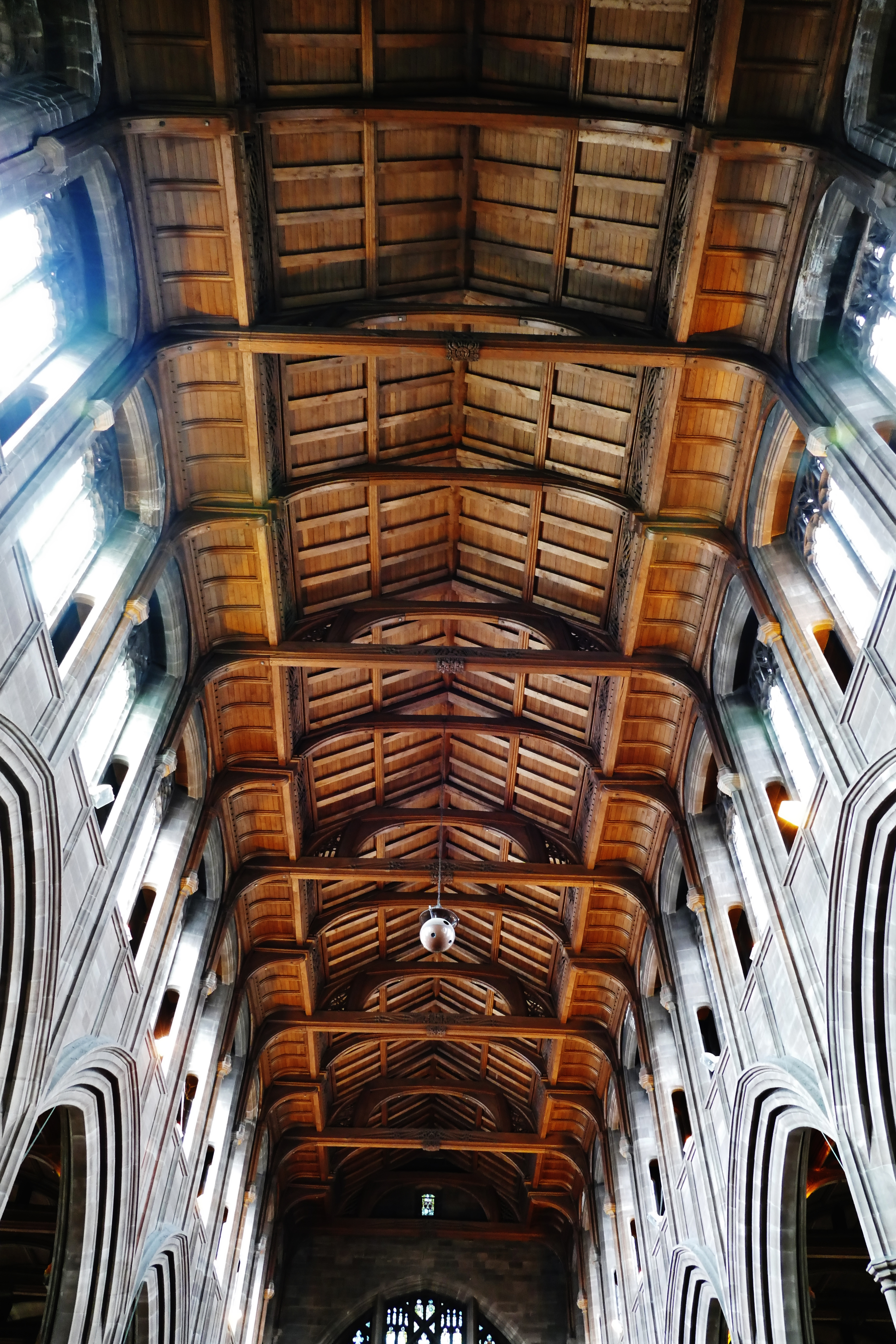
Ceiling features

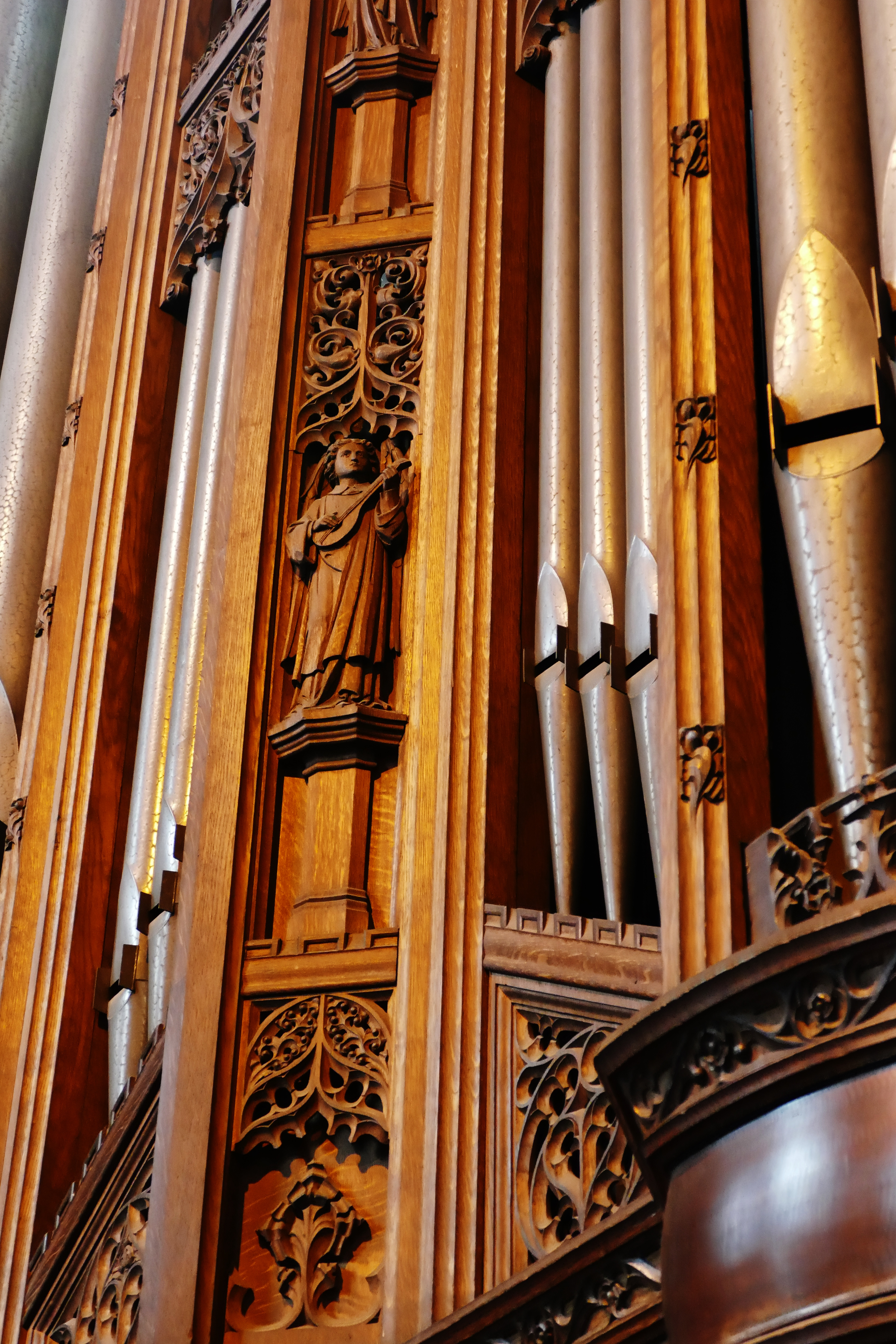
Organ case and pipes

== External features ==
In the churchyard is a sandstone memorial to the First World War dating from about 1920. It includes panels inscribed with the names of 137 men, a tall cross, and a statue of Saint George standing under a gabled, crocketed canopy. It is listed at Grade II. The churchyard wall, its gate piers, and the gate piers to the adjacent church school are also listed at Grade II. In addition, the former vicarage to the church is listed in 1975 at Grade II. It was built in about 1920 in Arts and Crafts style. It is constructed in red brick with red roof tiles, and has two storeys. It has since been described as being "ruinous".

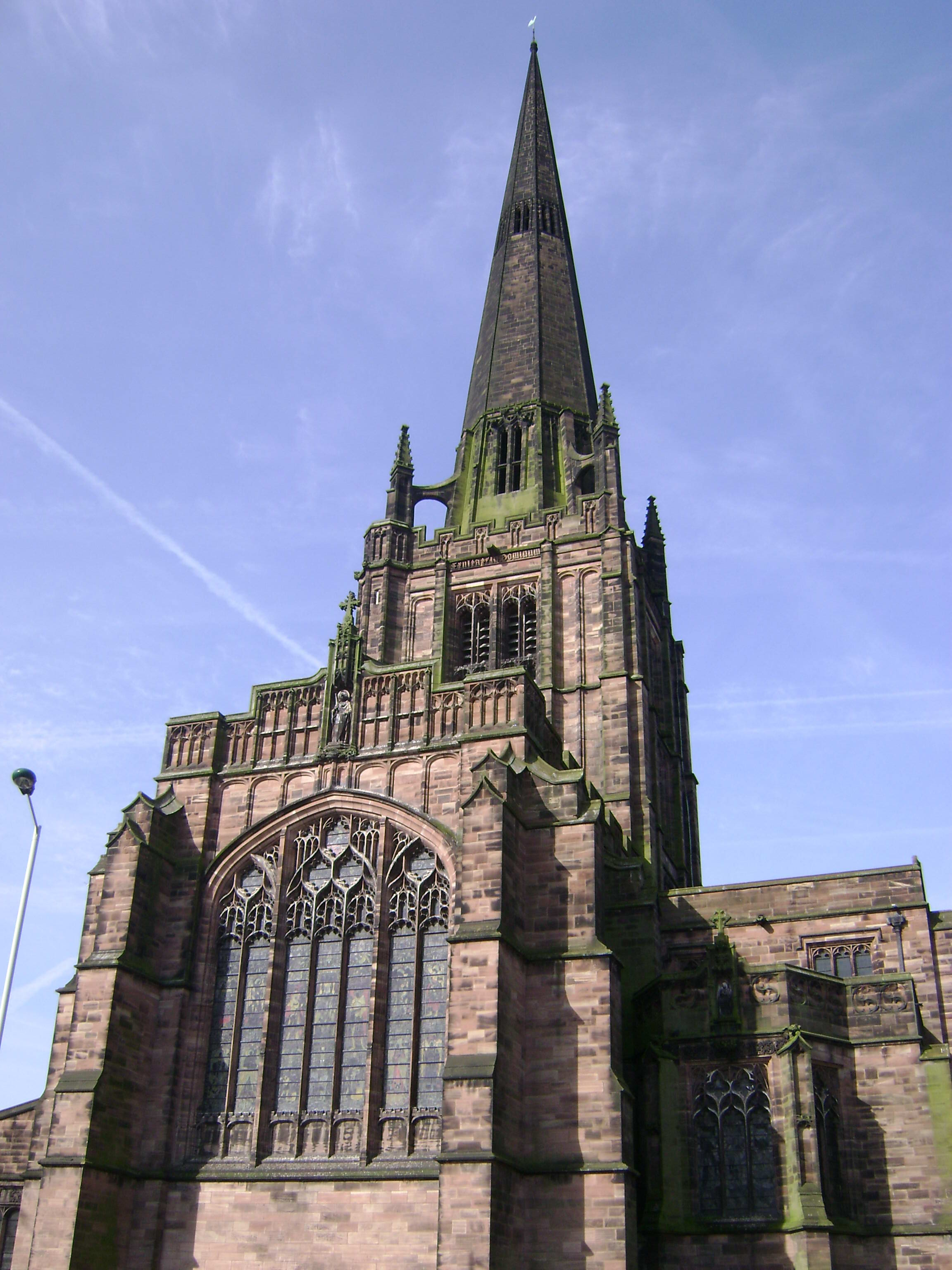
St George's Church

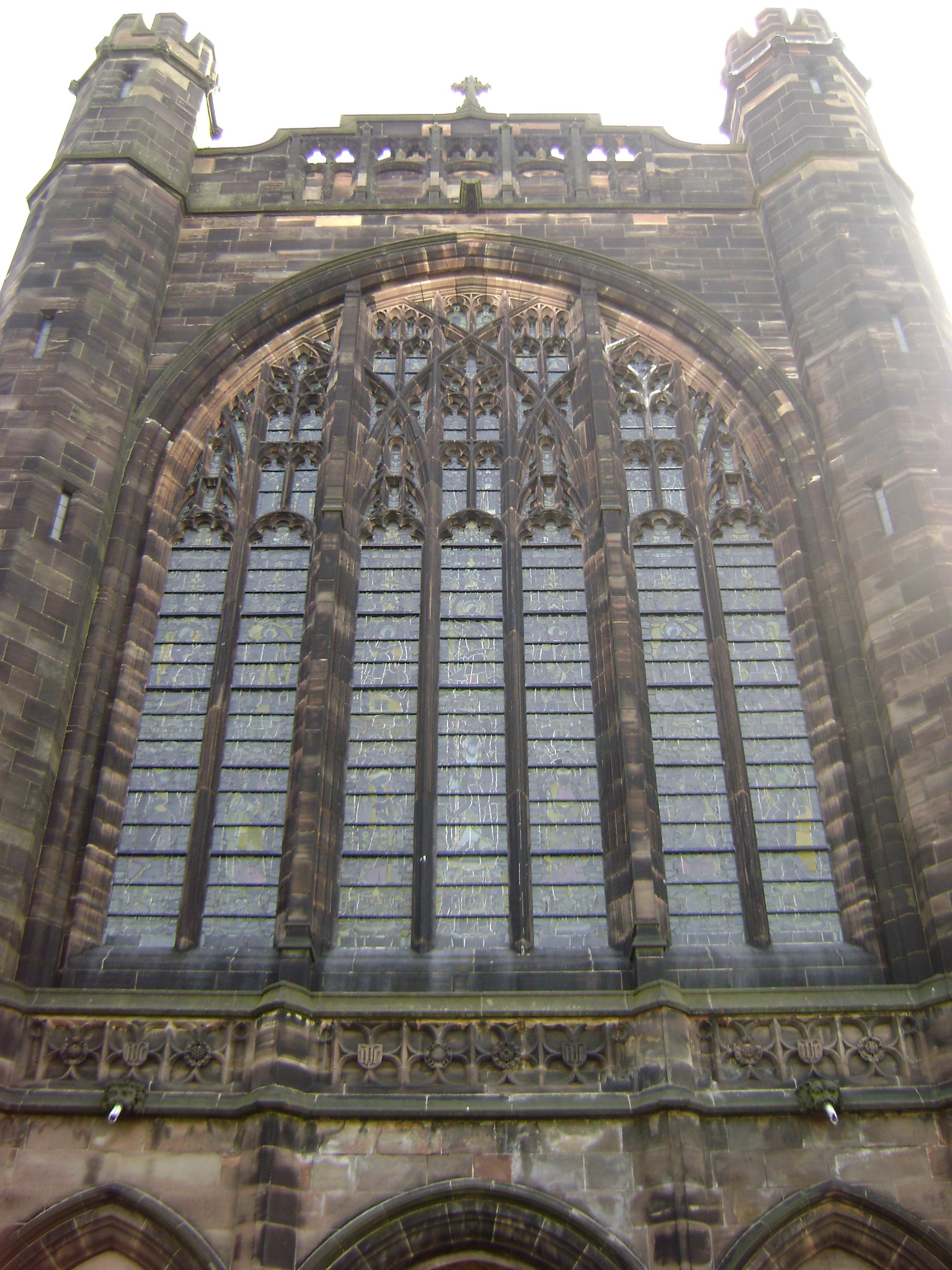
West window of St George's Church

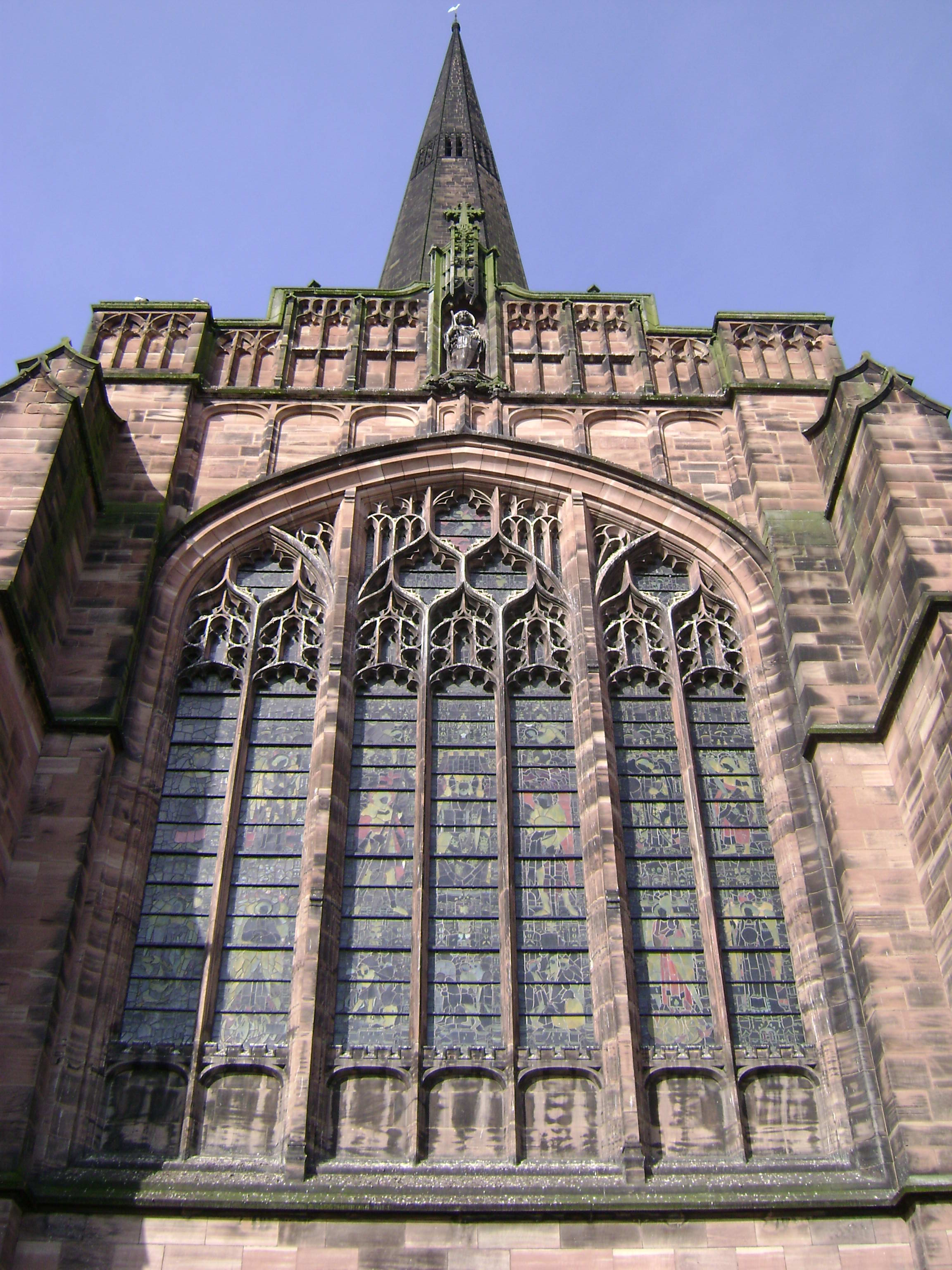
East window of St George's Church

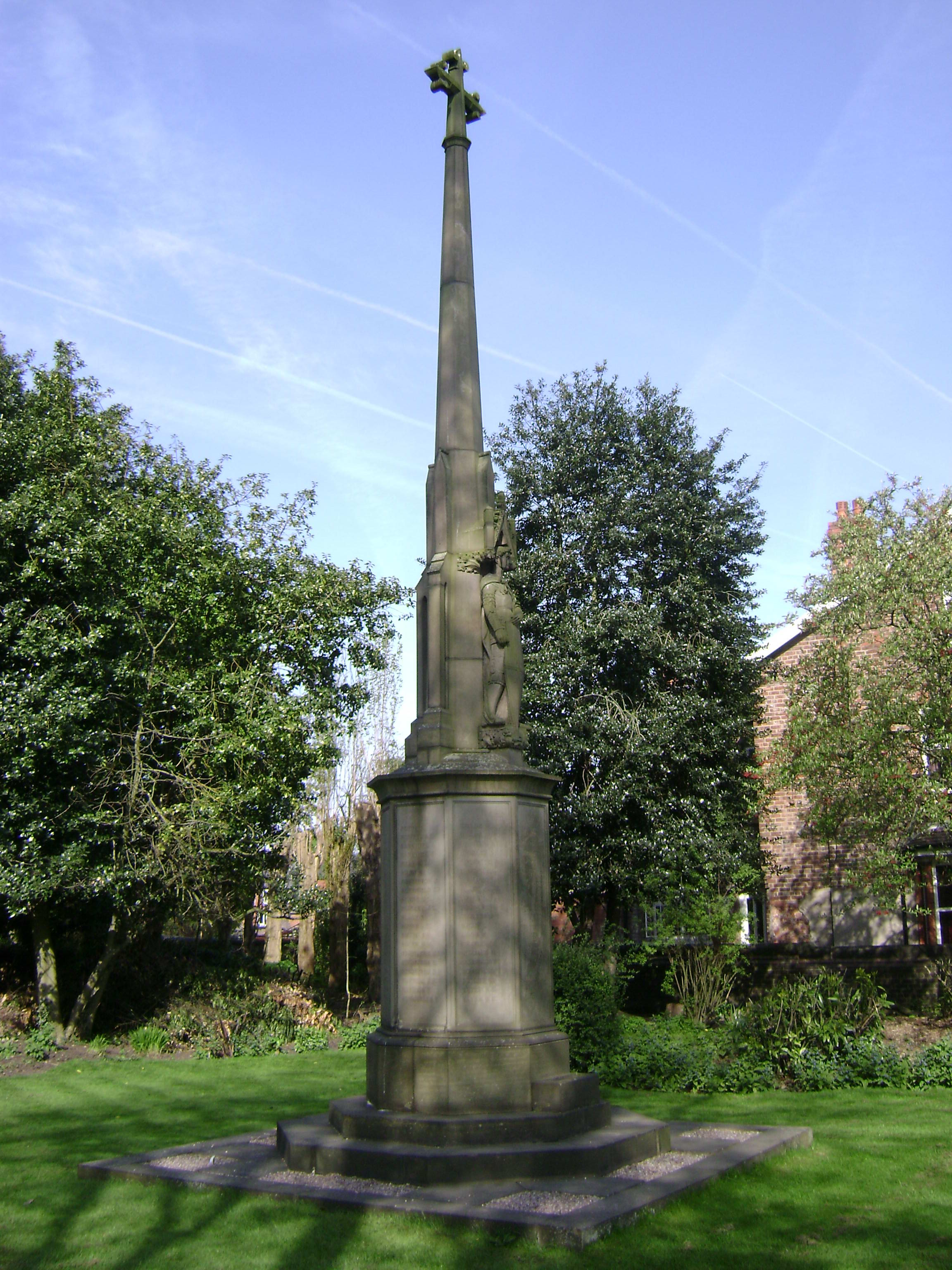
The Great War Cross, St George's Church

== See also ==
- Grade I listed buildings in Greater Manchester
- List of churches in Greater Manchester
- Listed buildings in Stockport
- List of works by Paley, Austin and Paley
