= Samuel Crompton =

Inventor, pioneer of the spinning industry (1753–1827)

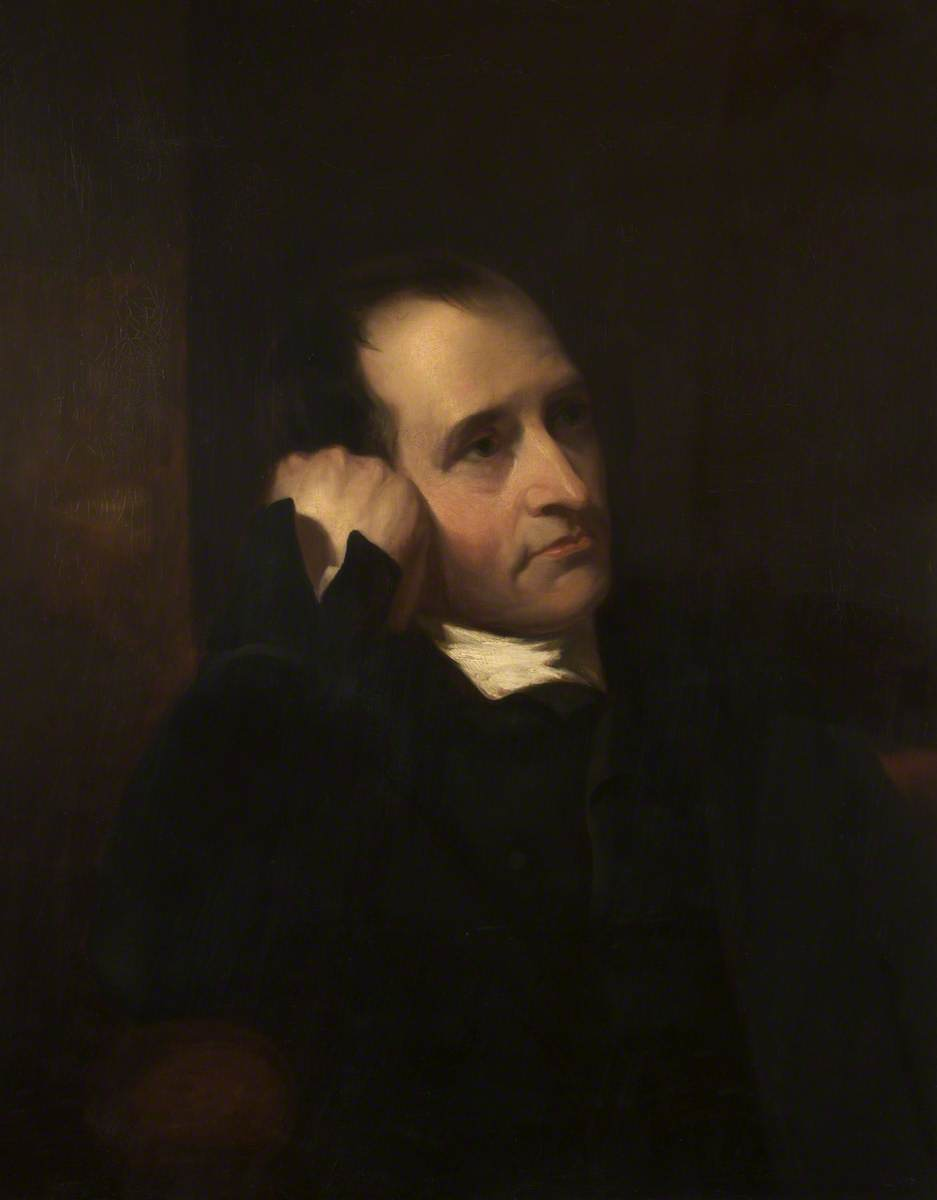
- c.1800 by Charles Allingham (1788–1850)
- Born: 3 December 1753; 10 Firwood Fold, Bolton, Lancashire, England
- Died: 26 June 1827 (aged 73); 17 King Street, Bolton, Lancashire, England
- Resting place: St Peter's Church, Bolton, Lancashire, England
- Occupations: Inventor, pioneer of the spinning industry
- Known for: Spinning mule

Samuel Crompton (3 December 1753 – 26 June 1827) was an English inventor and pioneer of the spinning industry. Building on the work of James Hargreaves and Richard Arkwright, he invented the spinning mule, a machine that revolutionised the industry worldwide.

== Early life ==
Samuel Crompton was born at 10 Firwood Fold, Bolton, Lancashire to George and Betty Crompton (née Elizabeth Holt of Turton). His father was a caretaker at nearby Hall i' th' Wood. Samuel had two younger sisters. While he was a boy he lost his father and had to contribute to the family resources by spinning yarn, learning to spin on James Hargreaves's spinning jenny. The deficiencies of the jenny imbued him with the idea of devising something better, which he worked on in secret for five or six years. The effort absorbed all his spare time and money, including that which he earned by playing the violin at the Bolton theatre.

On 16 February 1780 at Bolton Parish Church, Crompton married Mary Pimlott (or Pimbley). They had eight children including George Crompton (born 8 January 1781), who followed in the family business.

== Spinning mule ==
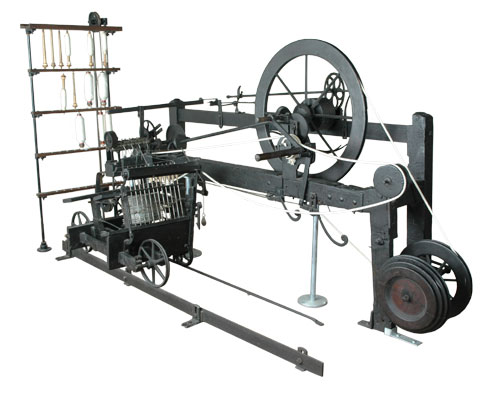
The only surviving example of a spinning mule built by the inventor Samuel Crompton, in Bolton Museum.

About 1779, Samuel Crompton succeeded in producing a mule-jenny, a machine which spun yarn suitable for use in the manufacture of muslin. It was known as the muslin wheel or the Hall i' th' Woodwheel, from the name of the house in which he and his family now lived. The mule-jenny later became known as the spinning mule. There was a strong demand for the yarn which Crompton was making at Hall i' th' Wood but he lacked the means to take out a patent. The prying into his methods forced Crompton to choose between destroying his machine or making it public. He adopted the latter alternative after promises by a number of manufacturers to pay him for the use of the mule. He then resumed spinning on his own account, but with indifferent success.

The mule-jenny twisted the rovings using rollers in the manner of Arkwright's frame, while the spindle carriage moved back and forth 54 inches to stretch the thread, and then to gather it in the spinning spindles in the manner of Hargreaves jenny. The mule's importance was that it could spin thread better than could be done by hand, which led to ever finer thread. Coarse thread (40s) sold for 14 shillings per pound whilst (80s) spun on his mule sold at 42 shillings a pound.

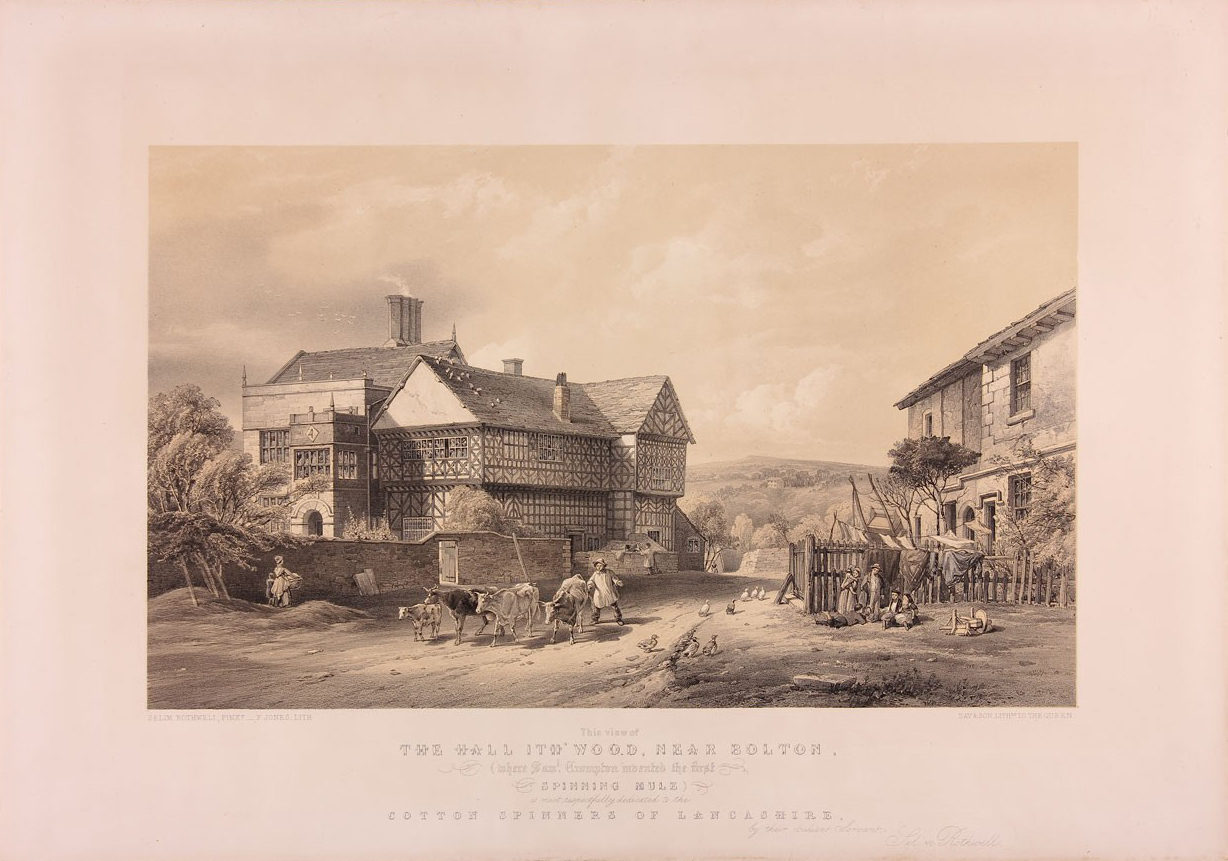
"This view of The Hall ith' Wood near Bolton. (where Samuel Crompton invented the first Spinning Mule) ...respectfully dedicated to the Cotton Spinners of Lancashire." Lithograph by F. Jones (Day & Son, Lithographers to the Queen), after Selim Rothwell.

As the mule was unpatented others soon manufactured it. The machine was constructed in iron, power was applied to assist the inward motion in 1790 and by 1834 it was fully automatic or self-acting. A survey in 1812 showed there were between 4 and 5 million mule spindles in use. Crompton received no royalties for his invention.

In 1800, a sum of £500 was raised for his benefit by subscription, and when in 1809, Edmund Cartwright, the inventor of the power loom, obtained £10,000 from parliament, Crompton was determined to apply for a grant. In 1811, he toured the manufacturing districts of Lancashire and Scotland to collect evidence showing how extensively his mule was being used, and in 1812 parliament awarded him £5000. With the aid of this money, Crompton started a business as a bleacher and then as a cotton merchant and spinner, but without success. In 1824, some friends and members (including Isaac and Benjamin Dobson, Benjamin Hick, John Kennedy and Peter Rothwell) of Bolton's Black Horse "prosecution" Club, bought him an annuity of £63 without his knowledge.

Crompton died at his house in King Street, Bolton on 26 June 1827, and was buried at the parish church of St Peter's.
