= Former Bank of England, Manchester =

Building in Manchester, England

Former Bank of England Building, Manchester
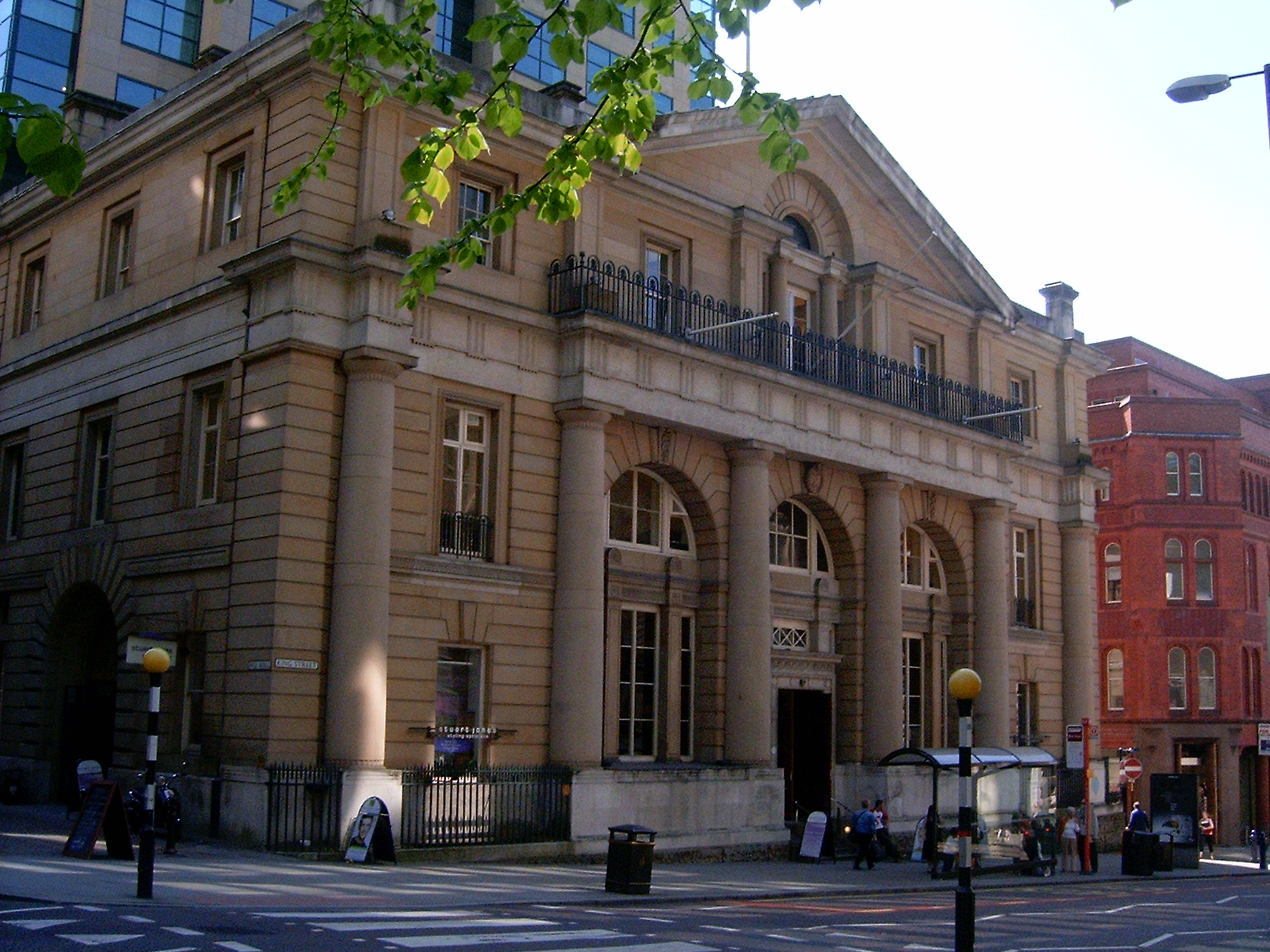

- Location within Greater Manchester

General information
- Location: Manchester, England
- Coordinates: 53.481372°N 2.243387°W
- Completed: 1846

Design and construction
- Architect: Charles Robert Cockerell
- Designations

Listed Building – Grade I
- Official name: Bank of England Trustee Savings Bank
- Designated: 25 February 1952
- Reference no.: 1291596

The Former Bank of England building at 82 King Street, Manchester is a historic banking building. It has been recognised as a Grade I listed building, maintained by Manchester City Council. It was designed by Charles Robert Cockerell and constructed in the 1840s, being completed in 1846.

It was occupied by the local agency of the Bank of England from 1847 to 1970, and the Bank returned to the site in 1998, moving into some of the modern offices built at the rear of the original building.

== See also ==
- Bank Chambers
- Grade I listed buildings in Manchester
- Listed buildings in Manchester-M2
