= St Edmund's Church, Rochdale =

Coordinates: 53.6210°N 2.1655°W

Saint Edmund's Church
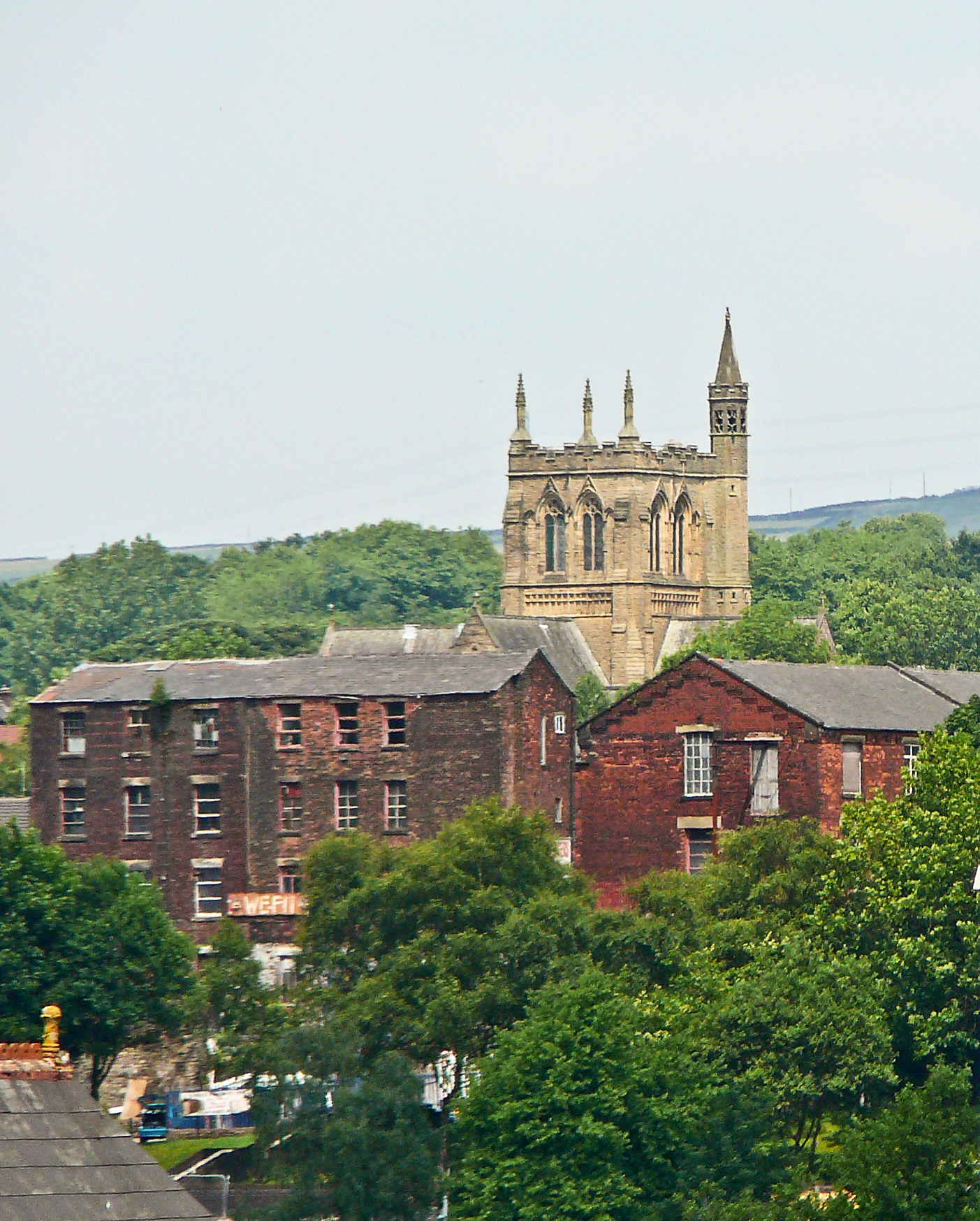
- St Edmund's viewed from Broadfield Park

- Location in Greater Manchester
- OS grid reference: SD 89132 13832
- Location: Rochdale, Greater Manchester
- Country: England
- Denomination: Church of England

Architecture
- Heritage designation: Grade I
- Closed: 2007

Administration
- Province: york

Saint Edmund's Church (or the Church of Saint Edmund) is a redundant church building located on Clement Royds Street in the Falinge area of Rochdale, in Greater Manchester, England. Commissioned by Rochdale's local industrialist and Freemason Albert Royds, the construction of the building was completed to a high and rich specification in 1873, with an "enormous" cost of around £25,000 (£2.35 million in 2025). It is the only known church building in England so overtly dedicated to Masonic symbolism and is therefore unique within English architecture.

Art critic Nikolaus Pevsner described the building as "Rochdale's temple to Freemasonry, a total concept as exotic as Roslin Chapel in Scotland". Because of the building's craftsmanship, design and prevalent Masonic theme, St Edmund's Church was recorded in the National Heritage List for England as a designated Grade II* listed building in 1985. The church closed for worship in 2007, and in 2009, The Victorian Society identified the building as "unusual and extraordinary" but also critically endangered. St Edmund's heritage status was upgraded to a Grade I listing in 2010 in recognition of its unique Masonic architecture and exceptional architectural interest. It has since been acquired by the Churches Conservation Trust.

== History ==
St Edmund's Church was commissioned by Albert Hudson Royds, an industrialist, banker and Freemason who belonged to Rochdale's prominent Royds family of wool merchants, financiers of the Rochdale Canal. Royds acquired a crossroads at the highest point of Rochdale and commissioned the Manchester-based practice of James Medland and Henry Taylor to design and construct a new church building "at a time when Freemasonry in Rochdale was a strong force and its members were stalwarts of the local community". The building was constructed between 1870 and 1873 at a cost between £22,000 (£2.07 million in 2025), and £28,000 (£2.63 million in 2025), at a time when a suitable parish church could have been built for £4,000 (£380,000 in 2025).

== Features ==
References to the traditions of Masonry are everywhere at St Edmund's, in the weathervane and lectern in particular. The interior of the church is designed around the geometric form of a cube. A hammerbeam roof springs from the walls and is decorated with the Masonic symbols of pomegranates, lilies and water lilies. The church has an "elaborate set" of stained glass windows with the Masonic theme on the south side of the building dedicated to building and Freemasonry. The Masonic theme climaxes in Royds Chapel, where the window depicts Nehemiah, Ezra and the Tyler, the guard of a Masonic Lodge, wielding the Tyler's sword. Solomon's Temple is shown with a likeness of Albert Hudson Royds as one of the master masons. In the main body of the church, the lectern features three brass columns all with the symbolic tools of masoncraft engraved on the base.

== Heritage status ==
Many churches in Rochdale display reference to Freemasonry but none so prominently as St Edmund's. The church was designated as a Grade II* listed building in 1985. The Victorian Society, the United Kingdom's national charity responsible for the study and protection of Victorian and Edwardian arts and architecture, identified the building as "unusual and extraordinary" but also critically endangered, placing it among the nation's top-10 endangered buildings. The building was upgraded to a Grade I listed building in September 2010 largely due it being a rare example of Masonic architecture on a church, as opposed to a Masonic Lodge. Nick Bridgland, Heritage Protection Team Leader for English Heritage in northern England said that "St Edmunds is unique as it merges the architectural style of Gothic revival with Masonic symbolism to create a building which is not only a successful parish church but also a temple to Freemasonry. The completeness of the Masonic scheme is unparalleled in England and the importance of this building is reflected in its Grade I listing".

== Gallery ==
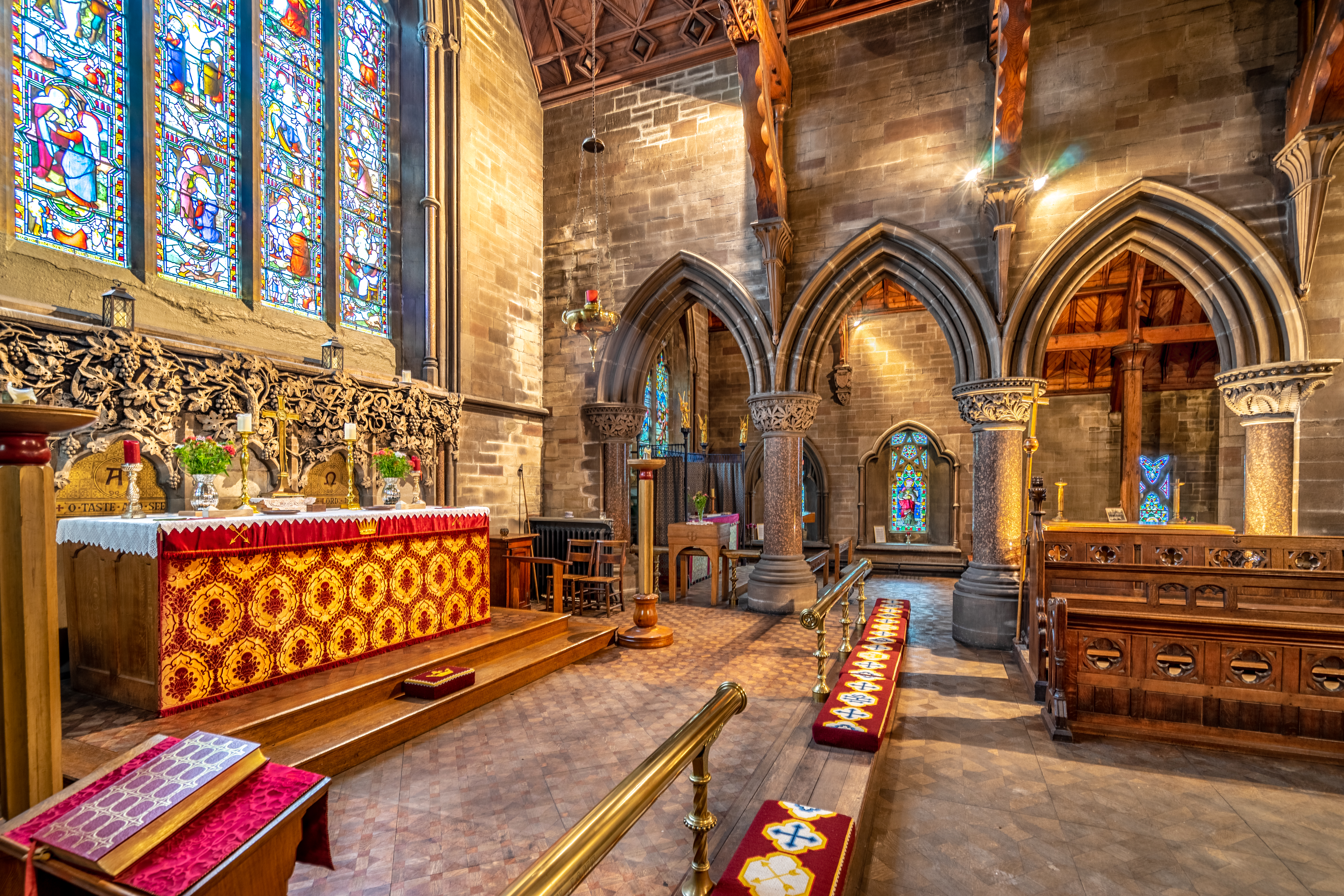
Chancel with altar

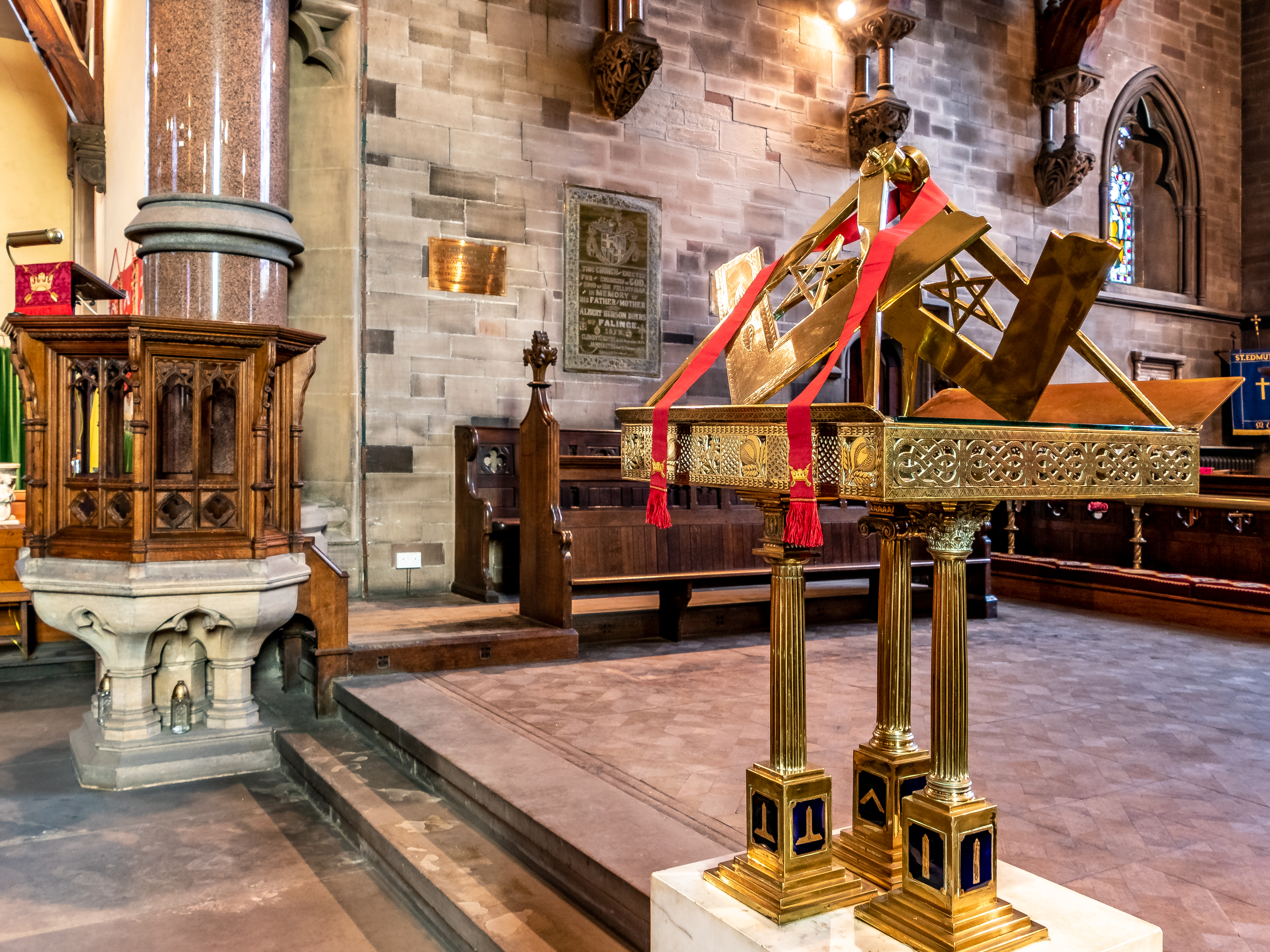
Masonic lectern

== See also ==
- Grade I listed churches in Greater Manchester
- Grade I listed buildings in Greater Manchester
- Listed buildings in Rochdale
- List of churches preserved by the Churches Conservation Trust in Northern England
