= Church of St Mary in the Baum, Rochdale =

Coordinates: 53.6188°N 2.1585°W

The Parish church of Saint Mary in the Baum, Wardleworth, Rochdale
- Saint Mary in the Baum
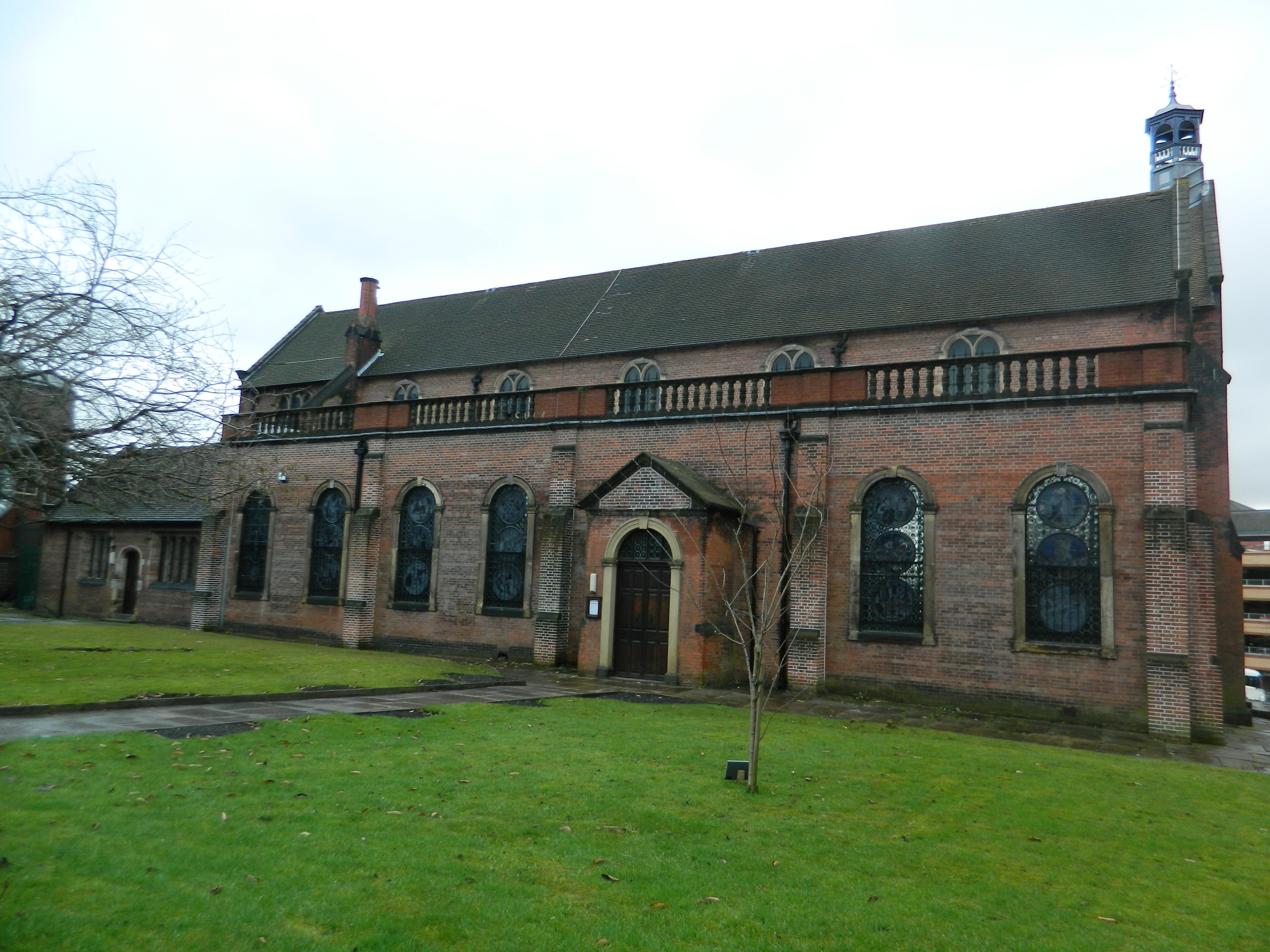

- Location in Greater Manchester
- OS grid reference: SD 89607 13606
- Location: Rochdale, Greater Manchester
- Country: England
- Denomination: Anglican
- Churchmanship: Anglo-Catholic

History
- Status: Parish Church
- Founded: 1909
- Dedication: St. Mary
- Dedicated: 2nd February, 1911
- Consecrated: 1912

Architecture
- Functional status: Active
- Heritage designation: Grade I
- Architect: Ninian Comper
- Architectural type: Gothic Revival
- Style: Perpendicular Gothic
- Groundbreaking: 1909
- Completed: 1911
- Construction cost: £15,000

Administration
- Province: Province of York
- Diocese: Diocese of Manchester
- Archdeaconry: Rochdale
- Parish: Saint Mary in the Baum

Clergy
- Archbishop: The Most Revd and Rt Hon Stephen Cottrell
- Bishop: The Rt Revd Mark Davies

The Church of St Mary in the Baum or Church of St Mary-in-the-Baum is an Anglican church in the diocese of Manchester, England. Commissioned in 1738, and opened in 1742 as a chapel of ease, the chapel was extended in the 19th century. In the very early 20th century the church authorities determined to construct a new building and they commissioned Ninian Comper to undertake the task. Comper designed a completely new church to an unusual plan, due to the constriction of the urban site. He incorporated elements of the original chapel into the new design.

St Mary's remains an active parish church in the Anglican Diocese of Manchester. It is a Grade I listed building.

== History ==
The first church on the present site was a chapel of ease opened in 1742. The name supposedly derives from the fields of Melissa plant which grew on the site. (Note: In Medieval times, the plant was used as a balm, "baum" in the local Lancashire dialect.) The land and much of the funding was supplied by Samuel Chetham, of Turton Tower and Castleton Hall and High Sheriff of Lancashire in 1738. The church was extended in the 19th century but by the 20th was in a state of disrepair. The parish authorities determined that repairing the structure would be more expensive than the construction of a new building and commissioned Ninian Comper to design a new church. Sir Ninian Comper (1864-1960) was born in Scotland. Specialising in ecclesiastical architecture, he established a major practice as one of the last proponents of the Gothic Revival. Respecting the parishioners’ affection for the original chapel, Comper incorporated elements from it into the new structure including the altar and the bell-cot.

The church remains an active parish church in the Rochdale parish.

== Architecture and description ==
The site of the church was restricted, to which Comper responded with an unusual floor plan. The nave and chancel are both placed on the south side, to take advantage of the light, while two aisles run along the north side. The architectural style is also rare; the brief required Comper to respect and reflect the design of the original chapel. The body of the church is his trademark Perpendicular Gothic, while the exterior aisle wall is Neoclassical. The church is built of red brick, with ashlar dressings. Claire Hartwell and Matthew Hyde, in their 2004 revised Lancashire: Manchester and the South-East Pevsner, describe the "sensationally high nave [as] uniquely effective’’.

The interior contains a memorial stained glass window by Comper which commemorates the members of the parish killed in the First and Second World Wars. Also by Comper are two Christ Pantocrators, images of a beardless adult Jesus unusual in Christian iconography. The church is a Grade I listed building.

== Folklore ==
In local folklore, the church's graveyard is home to a boggart or bogey known as the Baum Rappit. It takes a form of a ghostly rabbit with pure white fur.

== See also ==
- Grade I listed churches in Greater Manchester
- Grade I listed buildings in Greater Manchester
- Listed buildings in Rochdale

== Sources ==
- Hartwell, Clare; Hyde, Matthew; Pevsner, Nikolaus (2004) [1969]. Lancashire: Manchester and the South-East. The Buildings of England. New Haven, US and London: Yale University Press. ISBN 978-0-300-10583-4. OCLC 1023247427.
