= Church of the Holy Name of Jesus, Manchester =

Coordinates: 53.4645°N 2.2311°W

Holy Name Church
- Church of the Holy Name of Jesus, Chorlton on Medlock
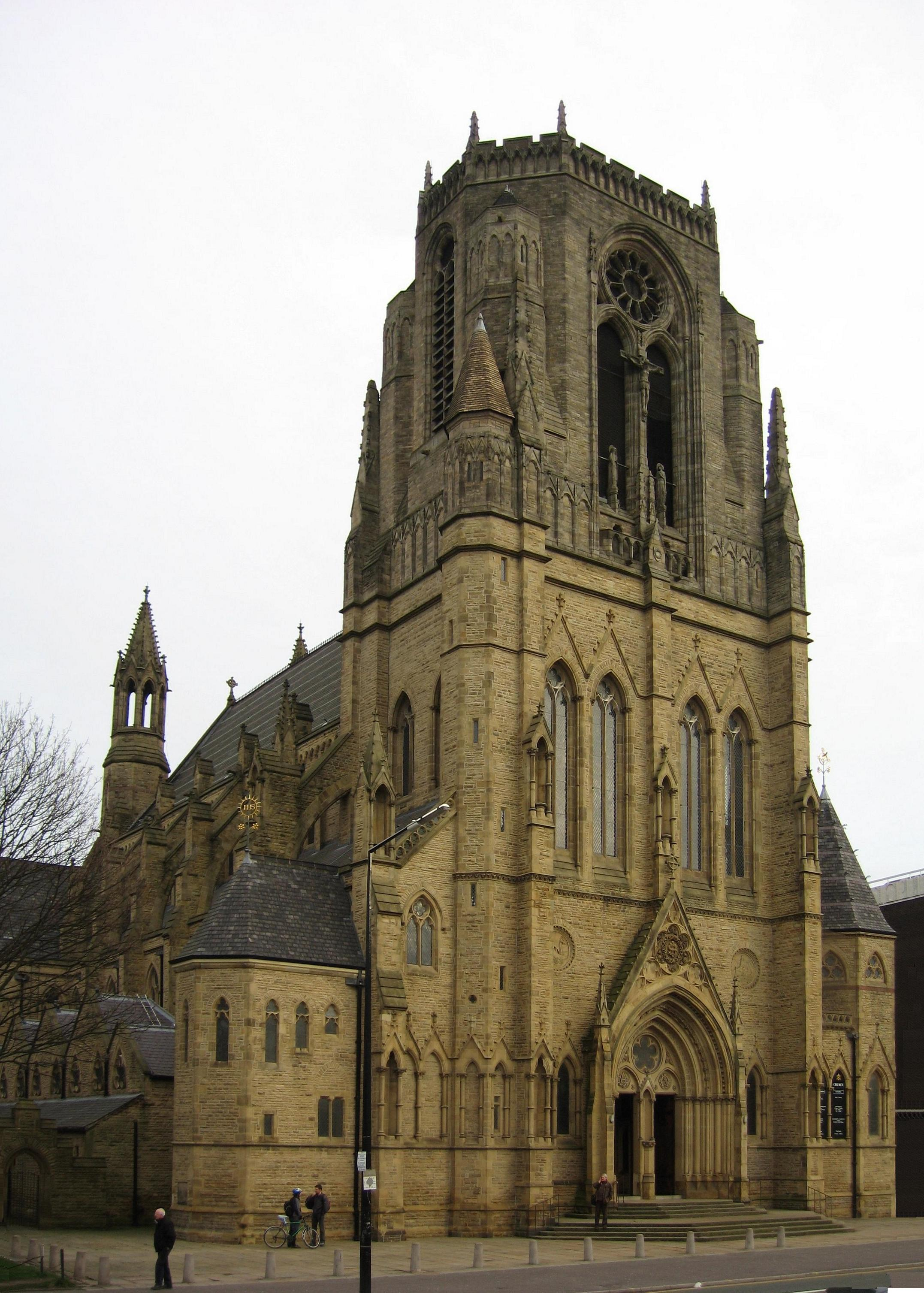
- View of the entrance

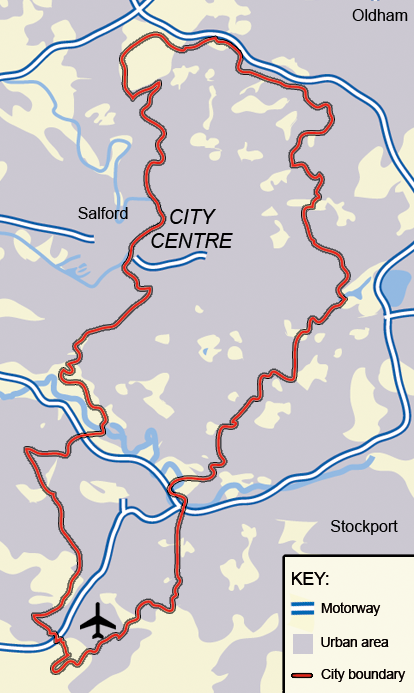
- Location with Manchester Holy Name Church (Greater Manchester)
- OS grid reference: SJ8475796438
- Location: Manchester
- Country: England
- Denomination: Roman Catholic
- Website: www.holyname.info

History
- Status: Chapel of ease
- Founded: 15 October 1871
- Founder: Bishop William Turner
- Dedication: Holy Name of Jesus
- Consecrated: 1923

Architecture
- Functional status: Active
- Heritage designation: Grade I
- Designated: 18 December 1963
- Architect(s): J. A. Hansom and Son
- Architectural type: Church
- Style: Gothic Revival
- Groundbreaking: 1869
- Completed: 1928

Specifications
- Capacity: 800
- Length: 186 ft (57 m)
- Width: 122 ft (37 m)
- Materials: Moulded Terracotta; Warwick Bridge stone

Administration
- Province: Liverpool
- Diocese: Salford
- Deanery: Chorlton-on-Medlock
- Parish: St. Augustine Church

Clergy
- Bishop: Rt. Rev. John Arnold
- Rector: Fr Paul Fletcher SJ
- Priest: Fr Philip Harrison SJ

The Church of the Holy Name of Jesus on Oxford Road, Manchester, England was designed by Joseph A. Hansom in partnership with his son Joseph Stanislaus Hansom and built between 1869 and 1871. The tower, designed by Adrian Gilbert Scott, was erected in 1928 in memory of Fr Bernard Vaughan, SJ. The church has been Grade I listed on the National Heritage List for England since 1989, having previously been Grade II* listed since 1963.

== History ==
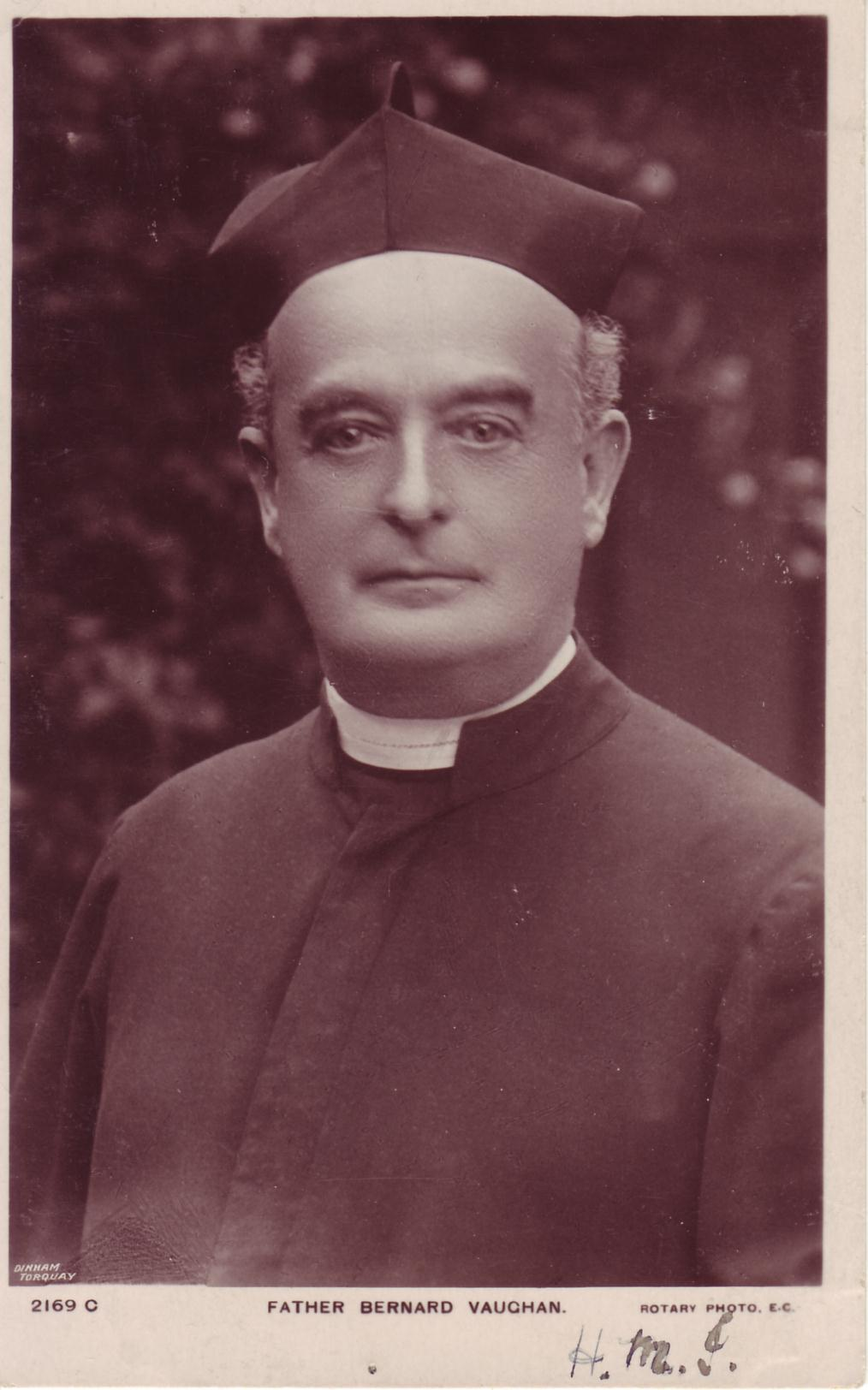
Fr Bernard Vaughan SJ

In 1860, William Turner, the first bishop of Salford, invited the Jesuits to make a home in Chorlton-on-Medlock, at the time a middle class suburb.

As well as the growing middle classes, Manchester was home to a large and expanding population of Irish immigrants who migrated to work in cotton manufacturing, especially after the Great Famine. In the area known as Little Ireland, the Parish of St Mary, Mulberry Street was unable to cope; in twenty years, thirteen priests had succumbed to typhus whilst working amongst the city's poor.

The Jesuits had a formidable record of outreach and missionary work, and this was put to good use. Whilst he was rector from 1888 to 1901, Fr Bernard Vaughan SJ took part in a series of debates with the Anglican Bishop of Manchester, James Moorhouse, over rival claims of the Catholic Church in England and Wales and the Church of England to be the Catholic Church in England and successor of St. Augustine. In their jubilation, the young men of Holy Name pulled his carriage from the city centre all the way to the church.

== Construction ==
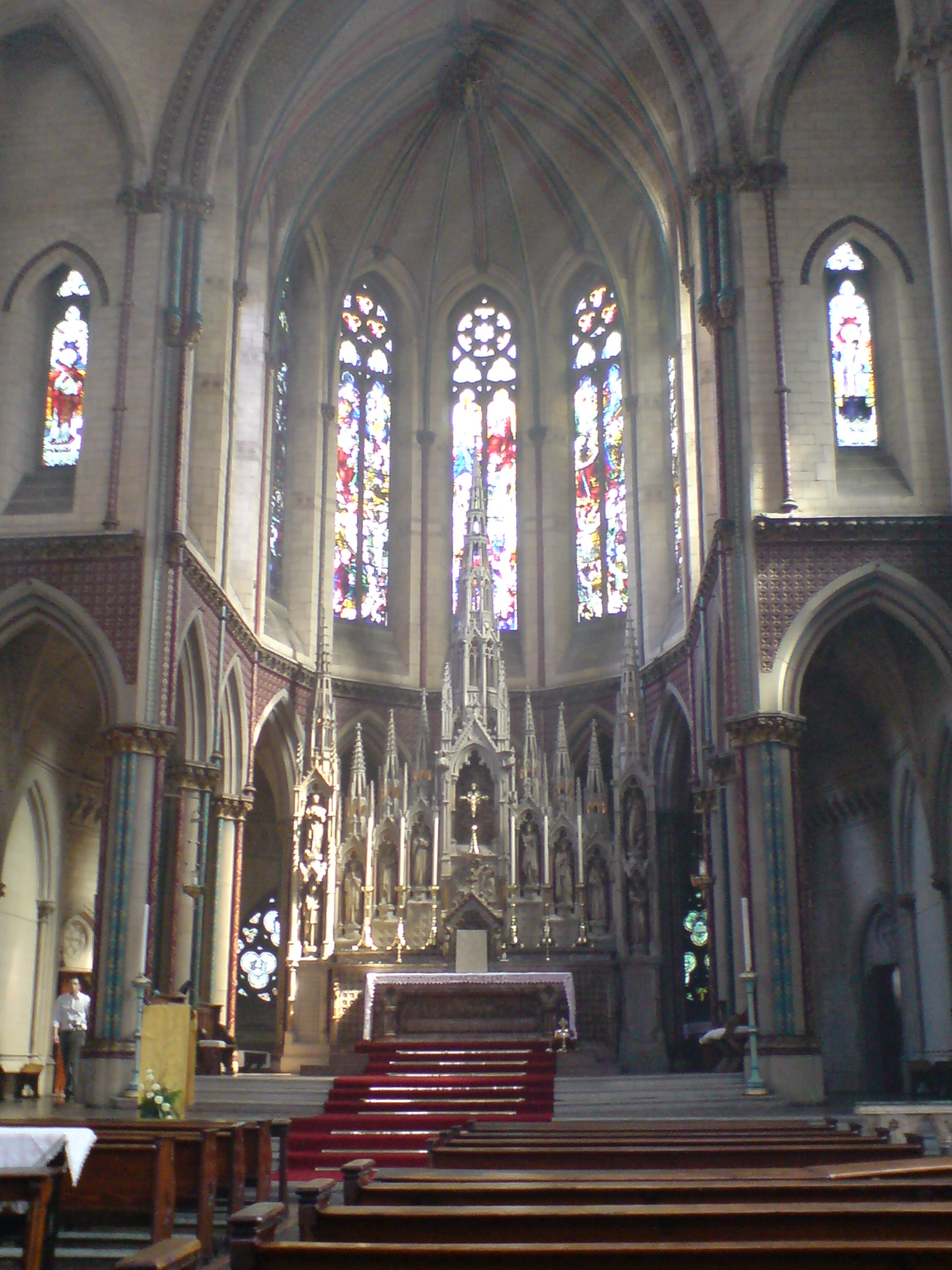
Main altar

Bishop Turner was keen to have a church in Chorlton-on-Medlock staffed with priests who could meet the intellectual, apologetic and controversial needs of Manchester. Jesuits from St Helens came to settle, at first in a temporary church (now the site of the Holy Name Hall, which has since been sold). Holy Name was made a parish church to serve the growing populations of the parishes of Longsight and Chorlton-on-Medlock, as villas were replaced by streets as the population of industrial Manchester grew. The construction of the building reinforced the power of the Jesuit order and the revived confidence of the English Catholics. It is the largest church in Manchester and dominates the surrounding area.

The church's dimensions and proportions are on the scale of a 14th-century cathedral; it is 186 feet long east to west and 112 feet wide. The architect Joseph Aloysius Hansom (who gave his name to the Hansom Cab) based the building on Gothic styles of France. Sir Nikolaus Pevsner described it as

"...a design of the very highest quality and of an originality nowhere demonstrative; ... Hansom never again did so marvellous a church."

Although medieval in appearance, it is a counter-Reformation church, designed to teach the faith through its external liturgical and devotional manifestation. It gives maximum exposure to the solemn celebration of the Mass (a raised altar near the congregation with no rood screen, and a shallow, broad sanctuary), the cult of the Eucharist (the eye is first carried to the tabernacle and the exposition throne above), preaching (a large pulpit to place the preacher intimately in the congregation), and the hearing of confessions (the whole north side is taken up with confessionals designed for long hours of priestly ministration). Consequently, the pillars in the church are unusually slender, accomplished by making the roof of the church from hollow terracotta tubes, manufactured by Gibbs and Canning.

Built in brick, it is clad in brushed Warwick stone. Hansom's original design called for a broad shrine shaped steeple 73 feet high. In 1928 the tower was built, designed by Adrian Gilbert Scott.

The nave can accommodate 800 worshippers. Small chapels adorn the south side, along with the baptistery towards the west. On the north side are confessionals, each with a fireplace. Between the confessionals and the chapels are the Stations of the Cross. The pulpit has a mosaic of the English Martyrs. According to Simon Jenkins, the church interior has "an aura unlike any church I know", and the interior decoration gives an "impression of no expense spared".

== Liturgy ==
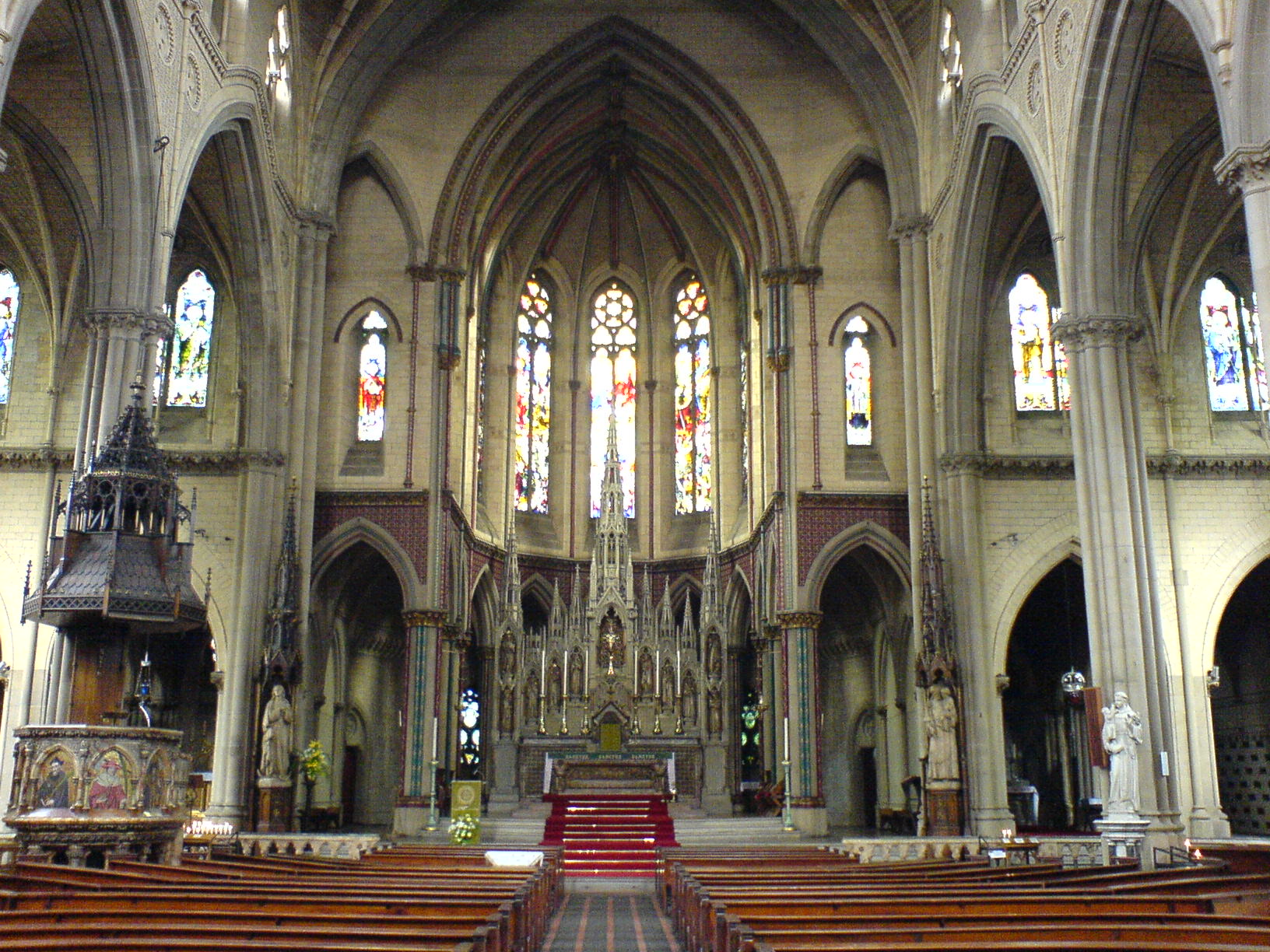
Nave

At the Holy Name, mass is celebrated in English. The celebration of the liturgy is designed to be catechetical, with solemn ritual, music, hymns and a familiar preaching style. Sunday Mass lasts about an hour. Weekday Masses, designed to suit the student timetable, are at 12:30pm. Each lunchtime there is exposition of the Blessed Sacrament at noon, during which confessions are heard.

== Music ==
The organ is located at the west end of the nave. Built in 1871 by William Hill & Son of London, it has 48 speaking stops over three-manuals and pedals. It was completely rebuilt in 1926 by Messrs Wadsworth Ltd and restored in 2004. It is maintained by David Wells of Liverpool. The pipes on the front of the case are ornately diapered and were restored to their original colour scheme of lighter shades of red and green with gold motifs. Above the organ and choir loft are two gilded angels.

Music for the Solemn Mass follows the decrees of the Vatican, and utilises Gregorian chant and polyphony on Sundays (with congregational English hymns), whilst for major solemnities there are classical organ and orchestral settings from the 17th to the 21st century.

Proximity of the chaplaincy church to the University of Manchester and Royal Northern College of Music means that students play an integral role in the musical life of the church, through participating in the two active choral groups, using the church as concert venue for student led classical and sacred music groups, and providing a place for music students to practice.

== Clergy ==
The bishop asked the Jesuits to close the church in 1985. By then the congregation had dwindled because of local shifts in housing and demographics, and the church was closed for most of the day. The diocese did not want it, so the major superiors of England and Wales were asked to consider its viability. A community of secular priests and lay brothers (an Oratory of St Philip in Formation) came to Manchester in 1992 and since then the church has been in the process of massive renovation project. It is open daily and congregational numbers have increased.

In September 2012, it was announced that the Jesuits would return to Manchester to take over the chaplaincy to the Universities, the Royal Northern College of Music and the church. The Oratory community at the Holy Name under Fr Raymond Matus was relocated to St Chad's, Cheetham Hill where Bishop Terence Brain had granted them permission to establish a Congregation of the Oratory of Saint Philip Neri.

== Sebastião Pinto Leite ==
- Sebastião Pinto Leite Count of Penha Longa, Viscount of Ganderinha, a member of the wealthy Portuguese and Brazilian Pinto Leite mercantile and banking family based in Porto and Lisbon. He, his brother Jaoquim Pinto Leite, and nephew, also Jaoquim Pinto Leite, and other members of the family, had at various points in the nineteenth and early twentieth century business interests in Manchester as Pinto Leite and Brother, a fabric exporting business based on Sackville Street. The family funerals, weddings and baptisms were held at the Holy Name. They were also major financial benefactors of the church, and several members of the family are commemorated within the church.

== Anthony Burgess ==
Renowned English author Anthony Burgess visited the Holy Name as a young man, in 1965 he wrote, ‘with me, at an age when I could not counter the arguments of the Holy Name Jesuits, it was unavoidable agony since it was happening, it seemed, against my will. As an English schoolboy brought up on the history of the Reformation, I rejected a good deal of Roman Catholicism, but instinct, emotion, loyalty, fear, tugged away.'

== Leslie Stuart ==
Leslie Stuart was a Southport born composer of stage musicals and popular songs of the Victorian and Edwardian era. In 1899 he wrote his biggest hit Florodora which was produced on Broadway in New York. In 1887 Bernard Vaughan employed Stuart as organist at the Holy Name. He lived nearby with his family in a large semidetached villa on Lime Grove.

== Pedro Ballester Arenas ==
Born Manchester 22nd of May 1996, was a Catholic student, who was diagnosed with cancer of the pelvis. He returned from Imperial College to Manchester to receive treatment. During this time he was resident nearby the Holy Name in Victoria Park where he died, under the care of Opus Dei. Pedro is a candidate for Canonisation. His funeral was held at the Holy Name in 2018.

== Jerome Caminada ==
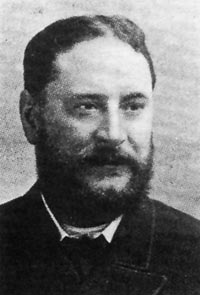
Jerome Caminada

Jerome Caminada known as the Manchester Sherlock Holmes was a Manchester born police officer and the first CID superintendent of the city. He had a long association with the Holy Name, he married Amelia Wainhouse there in 1881, and his requiem mass was held there in 1914.

== The Smiths ==
Manchester band, The Smiths, referred to the Holy Name church in the opening line of Vicar in a Tutu, "I was minding my business lifting some lead off the roof of The Holy Name church".

== Funeral of Pat Phoenix ==
The funeral of locally born actress Pat Phoenix, best known for her role of Elsie Tanner in Coronation Street, was held at the church following her death in September 1986.

== See also ==
- Diocese of Salford
- Manchester University
- Grade I listed churches in Greater Manchester
- Listed buildings in Manchester-M13
- List of churches in Greater Manchester
- List of Jesuit sites § United Kingdom
