= Hall i' th' Wood =

Country house in Bolton, England

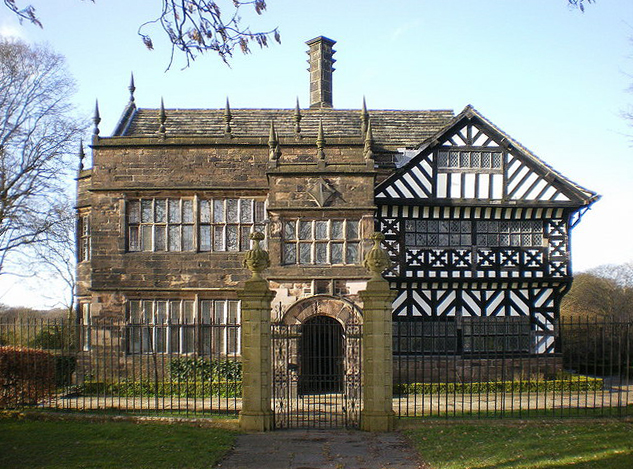
- Front view of Hall i' th' Wood manor house

- Location within Greater Manchester

General information
- Architectural style: Medieval
- Location: Bolton, Greater Manchester, England
- Coordinates: 53.60049°N 2.41895°W
- Completed: 16th century

Design and construction
- Designations

Listed Building – Grade I
- Official name: Hall i' th' Wood
- Designated: 22 April 1952
- Reference no.: 1388052

Hall i' th' Wood is an early 16th-century manor house in Bolton, Greater Manchester, England. It is a Grade I listed building and is currently used as a museum by Bolton Metropolitan Borough Council. It was the manor house for the moiety of the Tonge with Haulgh township held by the Brownlows in the 16th century. The original building is timber framed and has a stone flagged roof; there were later additions to the house, built from stone, in 1591 and 1648. The name represents "Hall in the Wood' spoken in the local regional English dialect and is pronounced /ˌɔːlɪθˈwʊd/.

The house was not used as a gentry house but rather given over to multiple occupation by families engaged in industry. Four (previously five) separate dwellings can be identified, each with its own entrance and staircase. One part was let to Samuel Crompton during the 18th century, where he designed and built the first spinning mule. About 1779, Crompton succeeded in producing a mule-jenny, a machine which spun yarn suitable for use in the manufacture of muslin. It was known as the muslin wheel or the Hall i' th' Wood wheel from the name of the house.

Hall i' th' Wood was bought by William Lever (later Lord Leverhulme) in 1899 and was restored by Jonathan Simpson and Edward Ould. Lever gave the house to the Corporation of Bolton in 1900.

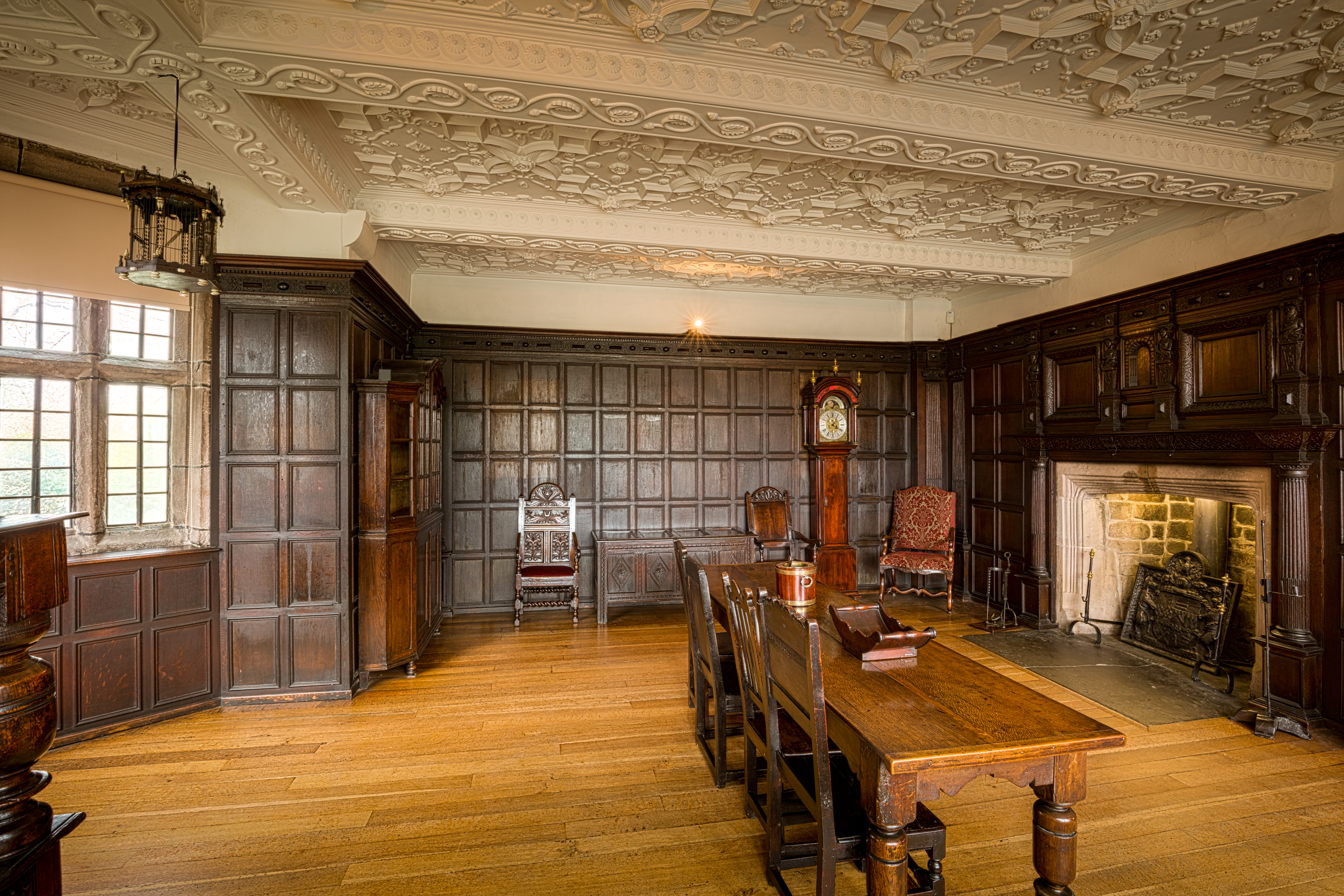
Dining room

An episode of the television programme Most Haunted was filmed in the hall in 2008.

In Fisher's Drawing Room Scrap Book, 1833, is a poetical illustration by Letitia Elizabeth Landon to an engraving of a painting of the hall by William Linton. This dwells on the changes the hall has seen over the centuries.

The hall closed in 2021 for essential maintenance, due to severe structural issues, including timber decay, damp, rot, and damage caused by vandalism. But in December 2024 it was announced that Historic England had pledged £47,500 towards Bolton Council's £95,000 plan for essential survey work.

== See also ==
- Grade I listed buildings in Greater Manchester
- Listed buildings in Bolton
- Hall i' th' Wood railway station
