= Hubert Austin =

English architect

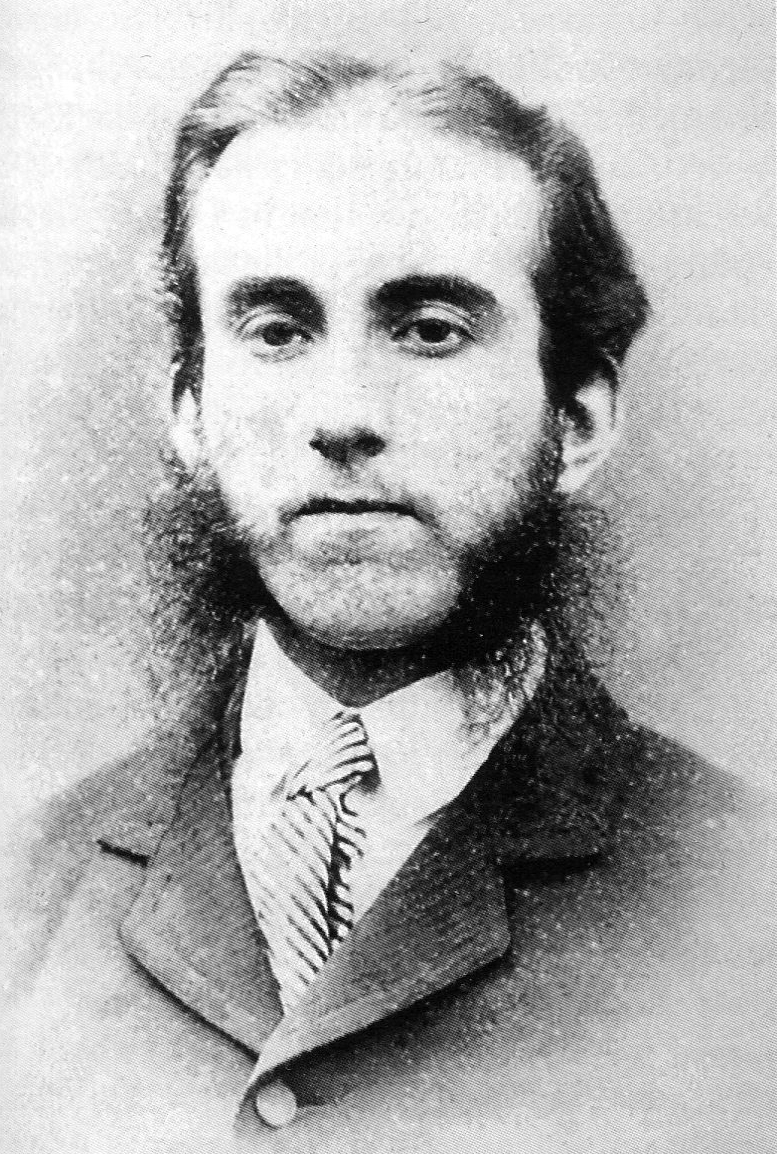
Hubert Austin in 1868

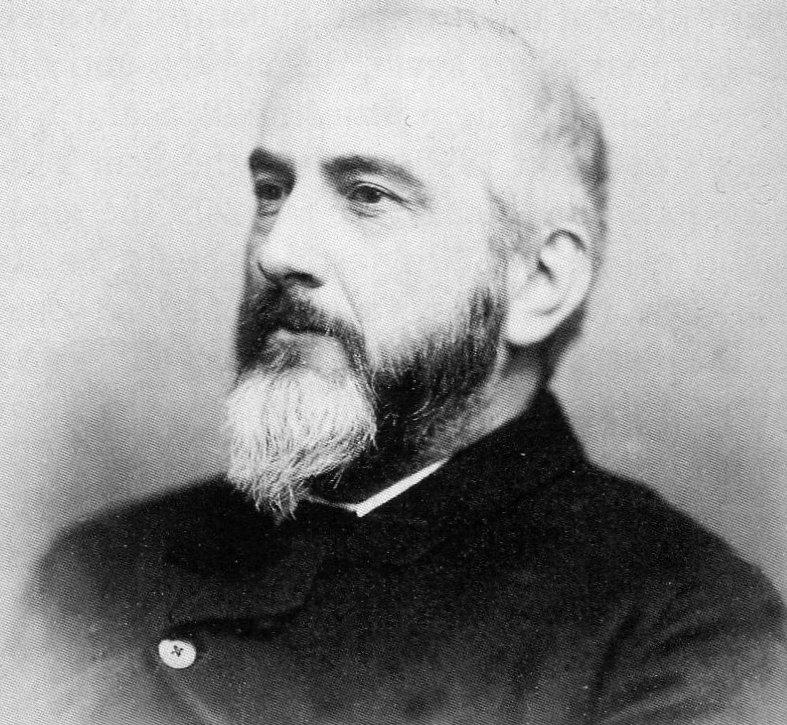
Hubert Austin in 1890

Hubert James Austin (31 March 1841 – 1915) was an English architect who practised in Lancaster. With his partners he designed many churches and other buildings, mainly in the northwest of England.

== Early life and career ==
Hubert James Austin was the youngest son of the Revd Thomas Austin, later the rector of Redmarshall, County Durham. He attended Richmond Grammar School, and in 1860 was articled to his older brother, Thomas, an architect in Newcastle upon Tyne. He then worked with Sir George Gilbert Scott in London before coming to Lancaster in 1868 as the partner of E. G. Paley, the title of the practice becoming Paley and Austin. In 1886 Paley's son Henry Paley became a partner in the practice and its title changed to Paley, Austin and Paley. E. G. Paley died in 1895 and Austin continued in partnership with his son, the practice becoming Austin and Paley. In 1914 Austin's son Geoffrey joined the practice as a partner and, for a short time, it was entitled Austin, Paley and Austin. However Hubert Austin died the following year, his son was on active service in the First World War and did not return to the practice after the war, so Henry Paley continued the practice as the sole partner.

Hubert Austin was involved in the design of more than 100 new churches, mainly in Gothic Revival style, and in many church restorations. His work has been highly praised. Price comments that he "brought to the practice great talent and energy". Pevsner was of the opinion that it was he "it seems, who was responsible for the firm's masterpieces". When he came to the practice "the character of the architecture of the firm changed – a nobility and at the same time resourcefulness appeared which had not until then been seen in its products". Elsewhere Pevsner describes him as "brilliant" and of raising the work of the practice "to the level of the best in the country". In the Buildings of England series, Austin is described as a "local man of genius" with whom the firm "achieved greatness, distinguished for their thoughtfully creative designs with masterful handling of space, line and plane", and who transformed the firm into a practice which decorated Lancashire ... with churches the equal of any in the country".

== Personal life ==
In 1870 Austin married Fanny Langshaw, who was a niece of Edward Paley's former partner Edmund Sharpe, and they had five children. The family lived in a house called The Knoll in Westbourne Road, Lancaster, which Austin had designed. He took little part in the civic life of the town other than being a Commissioner of Land Tax in 1886. Outside the practice, his main interests were music, painting and sketching; he was a member of the local orchestral and choral societies. In religion, he was an Anglican, attending the town's parish church, Lancaster Priory, where he undertook the duties of vicar's warden for seven years and later being a sidesman. In addition to The Knoll, he owned Heversham House in Cumbria and Kingsworthy Court in Hampshire. Kingsworthy Court was an 18th-century house which he extended and rebuilt in 1905–06 after moving in; it was Grade II-listed in December 2024. The Knoll is also listed. Austin died at home in The Knoll in 1915.

== See also ==
- Sharpe, Paley and Austin
- List of ecclesiastical works by Paley and Austin
- List of non-ecclesiastical works by Paley and Austin
