= St. Aidan's =

St Aidan's is a Country Park between Leeds and Castleford in West Yorkshire, England.

St Aidan's or St. Aidan's may also refer to:

== Churches and cathedrals ==
- St. Aidan's Cathedral, Enniscorthy, County Wexford, Ireland
- St. Aidan's Church (disambiguation)

== Schools ==
- St Aidan's Academy (disambiguation)
- St Aidan's College (disambiguation)
- St. Aidan's School (disambiguation)

== See also ==
- Aidan (disambiguation)
