= St Aidan's and St John Fisher Associated Sixth Form =

Christian school in North Yorkshire, England

Coordinates: 53.985°N 1.521°W

Information
- Established: 1973
- Ofsted: Reports
- Enrollment: 1050
- Affiliation: St Aidan's Church of England High School; St John Fisher Catholic High School, Harrogate

The St. Aidan's & St. John Fisher Associated Sixth Form was created in 1973 as a venture in ecumenical education. The two schools, St. Aidan's C of E High School and St. John Fisher Catholic High School are based on the south side of Harrogate, North Yorkshire, England, separated by a five-minute walk.

The Sixth Form has increased in size since 1973 when with only 70 students, the two sixth forms were too small to run separately. Today, with over 1000 students enrolled, it is the largest associated sixth form in the United Kingdom. This allows it to offer diverse subjects. Although the majority of students come from the two stem schools, students join from other schools in the surrounding area, including those in West Yorkshire, most notably, Wetherby High School, Wetherby and Nidderdale High School and Pateley Bridge. After Sixth Form study, the majority of students continue to college or university.

== Curriculum ==
The Associated Sixth Form provides more subjects than would be possible if the two schools operated independently. Its curriculum includes GCE Advanced (A2), GCE Advanced Supplementary (AS) and Advanced Applied and Intermediate GNVQ levels. Students can select different specifications in the same subject, and those who are suitable study Advanced Extension Award (AEA) for one year at A2 Level. The majority of students have lessons at both schools.

== Specialist College Status ==
The component schools each have subject areas in which they have Specialist College Status. St John Fisher School has been awarded Specialist College Status in both Arts and Humanities and St Aidan's School has Specialist College Status in Science and Modern Languages.

== Notable former pupils ==
- Tim Edwards – cricketer.
- Alex Lilley – Yorkshire cricketer.
- Richard Burgon – Labour MP, Shadow Secretary of State for Justice and Lord Chancellor.
- Mark Sowerby – Anglican bishop and theological college principal.
- Robert Parkin and Timmy Miles of the pop band Royworld.
- Hugo Hatcher – guitarist of Blyth Power.

== See also ==
- St. Aidan's C of E High School
- St. John Fisher Catholic High School
