= Owd Betts =

Listed pub in Rochdale, Greater Manchester, England

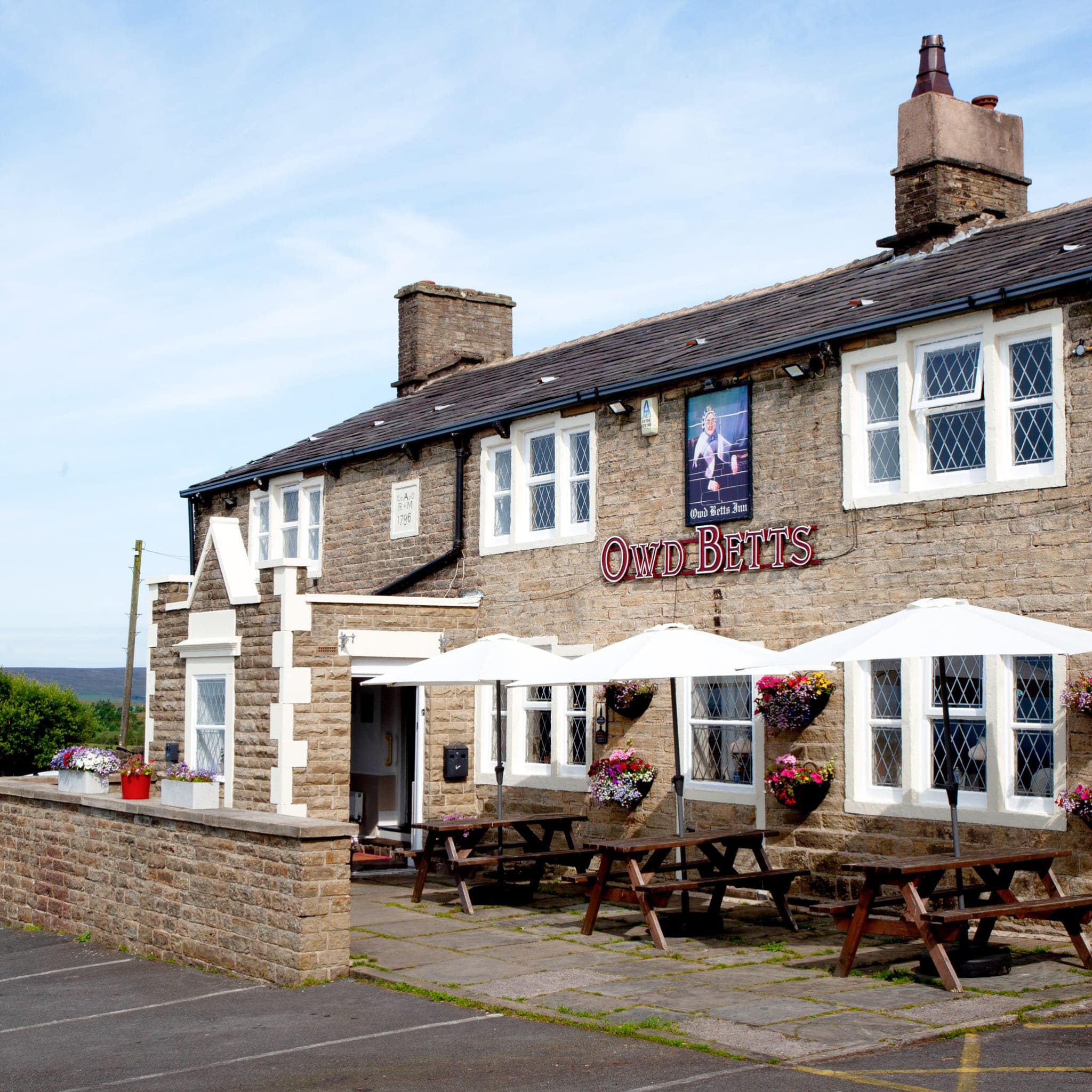
- The pub in 2025

- Location within Greater Manchester
- Former names: Hare and Hounds

General information
- Type: Public house
- Location: Edenfield Road, Rochdale, Greater Manchester, England
- Coordinates: 53.6406°N 2.2591°W
- Year built: 1796; 230 years ago
- Owner: Punch Taverns

Design and construction
- Designations

Listed Building – Grade II
- Official name: Owd Betts public house
- Designated: 12 February 1985
- Reference no.: 1084290

Owd Betts is a Grade II listed public house near Norden, a village in the Metropolitan Borough of Rochdale, Greater Manchester, England. Built in 1796, it is located on Edenfield Road (A640), on the outskirts of Rochdale. The building stands adjacent to Ashworth Moor Reservoir to the south and Scout Moor Wind Farm to the north.

== History ==
The building has operated as a public house since 1796, when it was known as the "Hare and Hounds" and run by landlords Richard and Mary Ashworth.

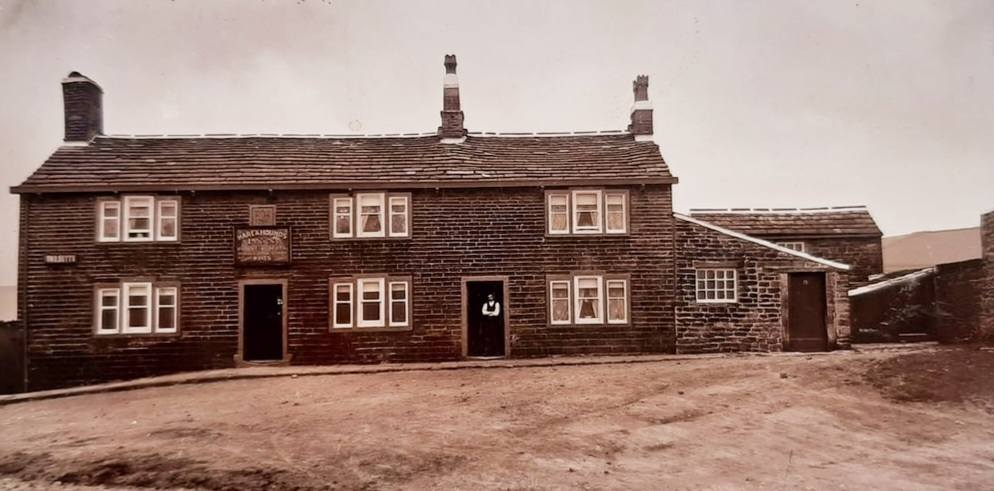
A 19th‑century photograph of the Hare and Hounds, the pub's former name

In 1869 the pub was taken over by Betty Ashworth, who was known to the locals as "Owd Bett". By 1950 it was officially renamed "Owd Betts" to commemorate Betty, who died in 1893. In 2016 her headstone was discovered at nearby St Paul's Church after the location of her final resting place had long been a mystery.

On 12 February 1985, the pub was designated a Grade II listed building by Historic England. In 2018 the landlord placed the pub up for sale for £194,995. As of October 2025, the freehold was owned by Punch Taverns.

== Architecture ==
The building is constructed in stone with a slate roof. It has three main sections, with a small rear addition on the right and a later extension behind it, along with a lean‑to at one end and a porch at the front. The front has three bays over two storeys, with a modern porch and a dated stone set between the middle bays. Each bay contains a three‑part window on both floors, fitted with a mix of sash and casement frames. There are three chimneys: one on each gable and another above the second bay, all set across the roofline.

== Paranormal activity ==
According to local media, Owd Betts is reportedly haunted by former landlady Betty Ashworth, with some claiming she can be heard walking the corridors and "keeping an eye on staff". In a 2018 interview with the Manchester Evening News, landlady Lynn Hartley claimed members of staff did not like to be left alone in the pub, with some reporting being pushed over and hearing footsteps on the landing.

In 2017 the television series Ghost Dimension: Flying Solo filmed an episode at the pub. In the same year, paranormal investigator Sean Reynolds claimed to have captured evidence of Betty Ashworth moving a bible and a cushion, as well as experiencing "strange noises" and a "blast of ice cold air."

In 2025 Owd Betts made a brief appearance in the BBC paranormal documentary Uncanny.

== Food and drink ==
Owd Betts has three handpumps which are used to serve real ales. The pub serves Wainwright Gold as a permanent ale, and two guest ales, one of which is typically from a local microbrewery.

Dishes served at Owd Betts include traditional British pub-style food, including Lancashire hotpot, rag pudding, and cheese and onion pie (described as "famous" by the Manchester Evening News).

== See also ==
- Listed buildings in Rochdale
- Listed pubs in Greater Manchester
