= St. Aidan's Church =

St. Aidan's Church may refer to:

== Africa ==
- St Aidan's Anglican Church, Johannesburg, South Africa

== Europe ==
- St Aidan's Church, Bamburgh, Northumberland, England
- St Aidan's Church, Basford, Nottinghamshire, England
- St Aidan's Church, Billinge, Merseyside, England
- St Aidan's Church, Blackhill, County Durham, England
- St Aidan's Church, Caythorpe, Nottinghamshire, England
- St Aidan's Church, Leeds, West Yorkshire, England
- St Aidan's Church, Butlersbridge, County Cavan, Ireland
- Church of St Aidan, Rochdale, Greater Manchester, England

== North America ==
- Church of St. Aidan (Toronto), Ontario, Canada
- St. Aidan's Church (Brookline, Massachusetts), United States
- St. Aidan's Anglican Church (Spokane, Washington), United States

== See also ==
- St. Aidan's (disambiguation)
- St. Aidan's Cathedral, Enniscorthy, County Wexford, Ireland
