= Egerton Arms =

Listed former pub in Ashworth, Greater Manchester, England

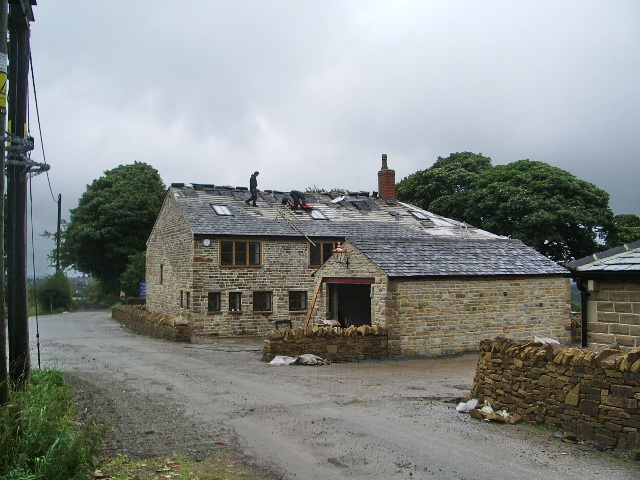
- The building in 2008

- Location within Greater Manchester

General information
- Status: Converted to residential use
- Type: Public house (former)
- Location: Chapel Lane, Ashworth, Greater Manchester, England
- Coordinates: 53.6213°N 2.2273°W
- Year built: Early to mid-18th century

Design and construction
- Designations

Listed Building – Grade II
- Official name: Egerton Arms
- Designated: 12 February 1985
- Reference no.: 1187085

The Egerton Arms is a Grade II listed former public house on Chapel Lane in Ashworth, a hamlet within the Metropolitan Borough of Rochdale, Greater Manchester, England. Built in the early to mid-18th century, it is reported to have closed in 2004 and was later converted to residential use.

== History ==
The building was constructed in the early to mid-18th century, according to its official listing. The 1910 Ordnance Survey map records it as the Egerton Arms public house. On 12 February 1985, the Egerton Arms was designated a Grade II listed building. Anecdotal reports state that the pub closed in 2004. The 2008 image in the article indicates it was no longer trading, with June 2012 Google Street View imagery confirming its residential use.

== Architecture ==
The building is constructed in stone with a slate roof and brick chimneys. It has two storeys and a double‑depth layout, with the main entrance in the centre and several later additions to the side and rear. The base and corner stones are visible. The first floor has two three‑part windows, with similar openings on the ground floor that have been covered, along with the doorway surround. There are chimney stacks on the gable ends.

== See also ==
- Listed buildings in Rochdale
- Listed pubs in Greater Manchester
