= HSBC Bank, Rochdale =

Listed building in Greater Manchester, England

HSBC, Rochdale
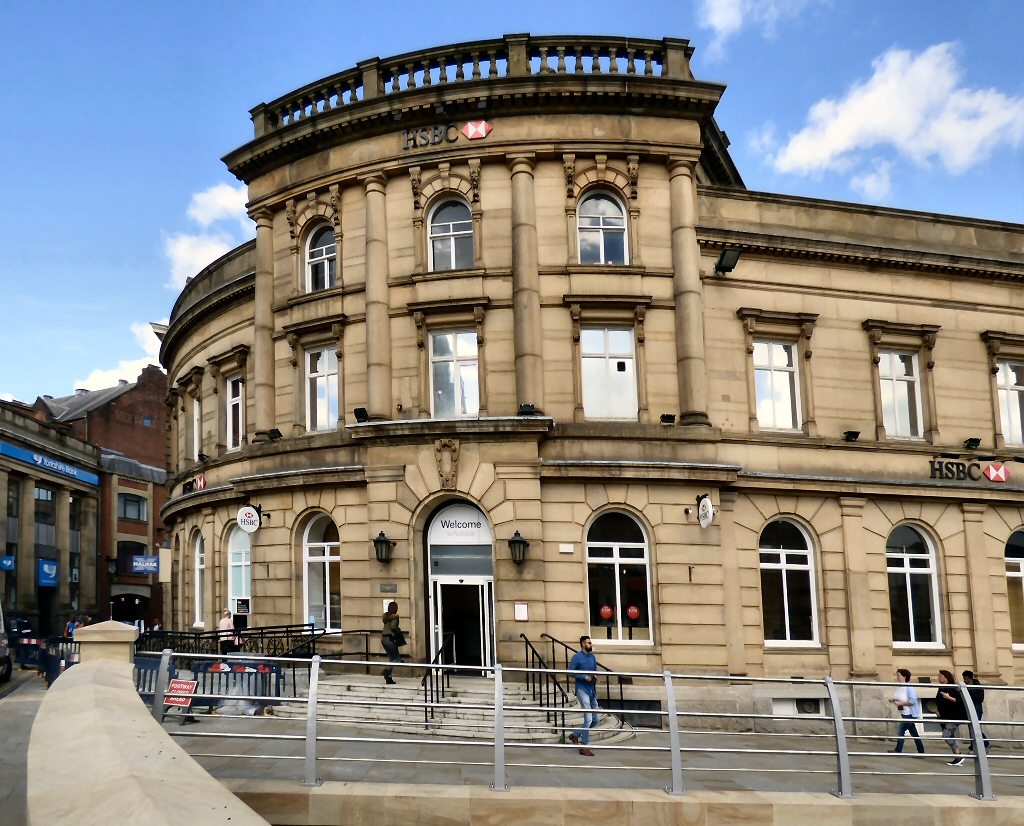
- The building in 2017

- Location within Greater Manchester
- Former names: Oldham Joint Stock Bank

General information
- Type: Bank
- Architectural style: Neoclassical
- Location: Yorkshire Street, Rochdale, Greater Manchester, England
- Coordinates: 53.6170°N 2.1581°W
- Completed: 1895; 131 years ago
- Owner: HSBC

Technical details
- Material: Ashlar sandstone, pink granite, slate
- Floor count: 3 (central section)

Design and construction
- Architect: Thomas Taylor (possible)

Listed Building – Grade II
- Official name: The former Oldham Joint Stock Bank, now HSBC
- Designated: 20 January 2015
- Reference no.: 1416154

The former Oldham Joint Stock Bank, currently operating as a branch of HSBC, is a Grade II listed building on Yorkshire Street in Rochdale, Greater Manchester, England. Built in 1895, it is a prominent example of Neoclassical bank architecture from the late Victorian period.

== History ==
The building was originally constructed for the Oldham Joint Stock Banking Company, which was established in 1880 and later amalgamated with the London & Midland Bank Limited in 1898. Though the architect of the Rochdale branch is officially unknown, stylistic similarities to other bank buildings designed by Thomas Taylor suggest he may have been involved.

In the early 20th century, the bank was acquired by the Midland Bank, which became part of HSBC in 1992.

On 20 January 2015, it was designated a Grade II listed building.

== Architecture ==
The building is constructed of ashlar sandstone with a rock-faced pink granite plinth and has a slate roof. It stands at the junction of Yorkshire Street and The Butts, occupying a corner site with a curved façade.

The structure consists of a three-storey central section flanked by two-storey wings. The ground floor is rusticated and incorporates pilasters and round-headed windows. A projecting central entrance bay contains a large round-headed doorway with a relief-carved keystone shield.

Decorative features include moulded frieze bands, dentil cornices, and a balustraded parapet, elements characteristic of Neoclassical architecture. Above the banking hall, an elongated hexagonal roof light with Art Nouveau stained glass admits natural light.

== Location and access ==
The building sits in the Old Town character area, adjacent to the historic Rochdale Bridge, which is also Grade II listed and spans the River Roch. This location places the branch at a prominent junction near South Parade and The Esplanade, with access to nearby public transport including Rochdale Town Centre tram stop and the interchange.

== See also ==
- Listed buildings in Rochdale
