= Ashworth Moor Reservoir =

Lake in Greater Manchester, England

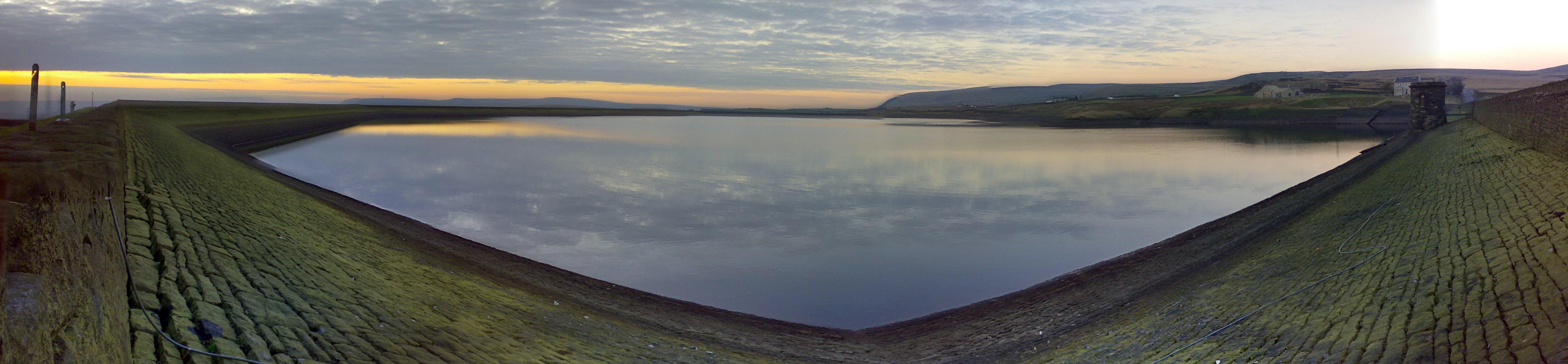
- Ashworth Moor Reservoir, looking north, image taken at dusk.

- Location within Greater Manchester
- Location: Greater Manchester, England
- Coordinates: 53°38′15″N 2°15′35″W
- Type: reservoir
- Basin countries: United Kingdom

Ashworth Moor Reservoir is an upland water supply reservoir amongst the Pennines in Greater Manchester, England, close to the A680 road between Rochdale and Edenfield. It was constructed in the early 20th century following legislation passed in the late Victorian period to expand the water supply of Heywood and neighbouring districts, and entered operational use in 1907. The reservoir remains part of the regional public water supply infrastructure in Greater Manchester.

== Description ==
Ashworth Moor Reservoir is located in the western part of the Metropolitan Borough of Rochdale, in Greater Manchester, England, on the south side of the A680 road which links Rochdale and Edenfield. Situated in the Pennines upland area, it is a heavily modified artificial lake situated at an altitude of approximately 281 metres (922 ft), with a surface area of around 22 hectares (54 acres) and a mean depth of around 6.4 metres (21 ft). The reservoir drains a catchment area of roughly 39 hectares (96 acres). The reservoir and its surrounding land are managed by the water company United Utilities as part of its countryside estate, and are accessible to the public and form part of a managed countryside area used for informal recreation, including walking.

== History ==
The origins of Ashworth Moor Reservoir lie in late-Victorian efforts to expand the water supply of Heywood and neighbouring districts. Under the Heywood Waterworks Act 1877 (40 & 41 Vict. c. clii), the Heywood Waterworks Company (HWC) was authorised to construct a new reservoir on Ashworth Moor, in the township of Ashworth, as well as the adjoining township of Spotland.

The bill authorised a system of embankments, the western of which was to terminate near the Hare and Hounds public house. The legislation also authorised associated infrastructure, including a catchwater drain feeding the reservoir, a conduit carrying water from the reservoir to the Heywood Waterworks Supply Reservoir, and additional lines of pipes linking it to further reservoirs and filtration works. To facilitate access, the HWC was empowered to remove the northern end of Red Hillocks Lane, and construct a new road to link Ashworth Road to Edenfield Road, appropriating the former route for the reservoir. Shortly after the statutory powers were obtained, contemporary notices show that the project was being transferred from the HWC to the local board of Heywood, reflecting a shift from private to municipal control.

By November 1888, work on the reservoir had not yet begun, and a statutory meeting of burgesses and ratepayers was held to consider applying for an extension of time for the reservoir and other projects. At that meeting it was stated that the necessary land, rights, and easements for the scheme had been secured, but that the statutory period for completion was close to expiry. An extension was therefore obtained in 1889, granting the project an additional ten years. By 1897, the project had still not begun, local reports indicating that the reservoir had not been needed up until that point; however, with demand rising rapidly in Heywood and Middleton and the expiry of the 1889 extension looming, the town council decided to seek a further extension of seven years, during which it anticipated that the works would be completed.

Construction on the reservoir finally began in early 1900, under the supervision of engineer James Diggle. The scheme was larger than originally planned, to accommodate increased demand, with the gathering area also increased. The following year, the Heywood and Middleton Water Board Act 1901 (1 Edw. 7. c. ccxxxvi) was enacted in Parliament to grant additional powers to the contractors. Visitors at inspection in 1903 then observed that elements of the works were already well advanced, including a largely completed embankment, outlet tunnels, valve tower, and catchwater arrangements. By 1905, much of the embankment had been completed, associated catchwater and outlet works were under construction, and the reservoir was beginning to assume its final shape. Two years later the reservoir was full and watertight, with the principal engineering works—including the embankments, valve tower, and overflow arrangements—substantially complete. By October 1907 the reservoir was holding a substantial volume of usable water and was being treated as part of the normal supply system. Surplus water from Ashworth Moor was authorised for disposal, and the works had effectively passed from construction into operational use.
