= Cemetery Hotel =

Listed pub in Rochdale, Greater Manchester, England

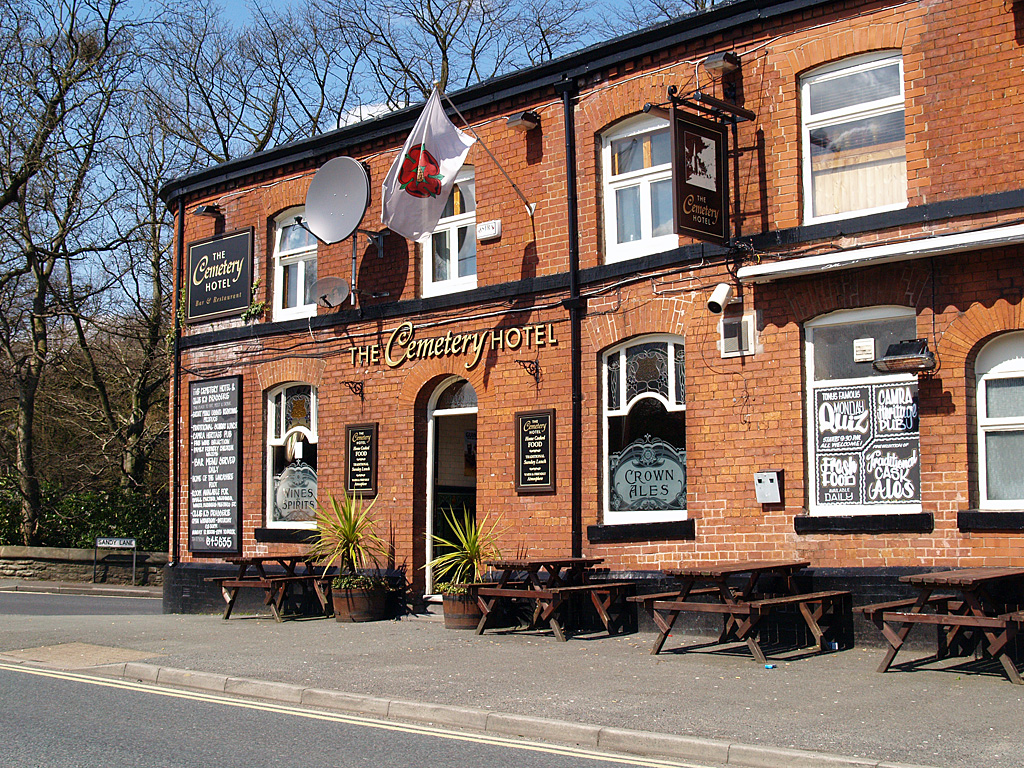
- The pub in 2008

- Location within Greater Manchester

General information
- Type: Public house
- Location: 470 Bury Road, Rochdale, Greater Manchester, England
- Coordinates: 53.6133°N 2.1817°W
- Named for: Rochdale Cemetery
- Year built: 1860s (possible)
- Renovated: Early 20th century
- Owner: Punch Pubs

Design and construction
- Designations

Listed Building – Grade II
- Official name: Cemetery Hotel public house
- Designated: 20 September 2010
- Reference no.: 1393976

The Cemetery Hotel is a Grade II listed public house on Bury Road in Rochdale, Greater Manchester, England. Thought to date from the 1860s and named after the nearby Rochdale Cemetery, it retains a notably intact historic interior, shaped in part by an early 20th‑century refit, and recognised by the Campaign for Real Ale (CAMRA) with a three‑star rating for "outstanding national historic importance".

== History ==
The building is thought to have been constructed in the 1860s, according to its official listing. Its name was taken from the nearby Rochdale Cemetery, a public burial ground established in 1855 on former open fields and later added to the Register of Historic Parks and Gardens. The public house was probably established in part to cater for mourners and others attending burials.

The 1910 Ordnance Survey map records it as the Cemetery Hotel public house. In the early 20th century, the pub received a full interior refit carried out by the Crown Brewery Company of Bury. The interior is recognised by the Campaign for Real Ale (CAMRA) with a three‑star rating, indicating its status as of "outstanding national historic importance".

On 20 September 2010, the Cemetery Hotel was designated a Grade II listed building. As of February 2026, the freehold is owned by Punch Pubs.

== Architecture ==
=== Exterior ===
The building is constructed in red brick, with the rear painted white, and has a shallow hipped roof covered in slate. It stands at the sharply angled end of a short terrace, where its footprint narrows to meet the corner.

The front has two storeys, while the rear rises to three. The entrance sits in the centre beneath a low arched opening and is now sheltered by a modern canvas canopy; the door is six‑panelled with a small window above it. Rooms flank the doorway, each with a wide window set under a gently curved head. These windows have Art Nouveau style stained glass in the upper sections and etched glass below, with the left one marked "WINES & SPIRITS" and the right one marked "CROWN ALES". Three windows on the upper floor follow the same curved-headed pattern, though the frames have been replaced with modern casements. A band at sill level and a dentilled band at the eaves run across the front and continue around the curved corner, where the window frames follow the sweep of the wall.

=== Interior ===
The interior is arranged around a central corridor that opens into a broad lobby with the bar at the back, from which three main rooms lead off. The porch has a mosaic floor with the pub's name and brightly coloured tiled walls, a finish repeated in the corridor and lobby. Each room is entered through a partly glazed door with its original number.

The front right room, formerly the vault and now used for pool, has a parquet floor, built‑in seating with later cushions, and a cast‑iron fireplace bearing its Rochdale maker's name. Opposite, the front left room retains four fixed seating bays divided by timber screens with glazed tops, with further screens beside the doorway. A band of panelling above includes oval panels now numbered, and the angled west wall contains a detailed fireplace with a mirrored overmantel and a dark blue tiled hearth.

At the rear left is a small snug shaped to fit the narrowing plan, with fixed seating on all sides, bell pushes above, a timber screen by the door, a reproduction fireplace and a modern serving hatch. The bar stands at the back of the lobby with a gently curved front; the structure above incorporates later stained‑glass panels and a modern back fitting. Below are extensive stone‑and‑brick cellars that open at ground level to the rear.

== See also ==
- Listed buildings in Rochdale
- Listed pubs in Greater Manchester
