= Blue Bell Inn, Rochdale =

Listed former pub in Greater Manchester, England

Blue Bell Inn
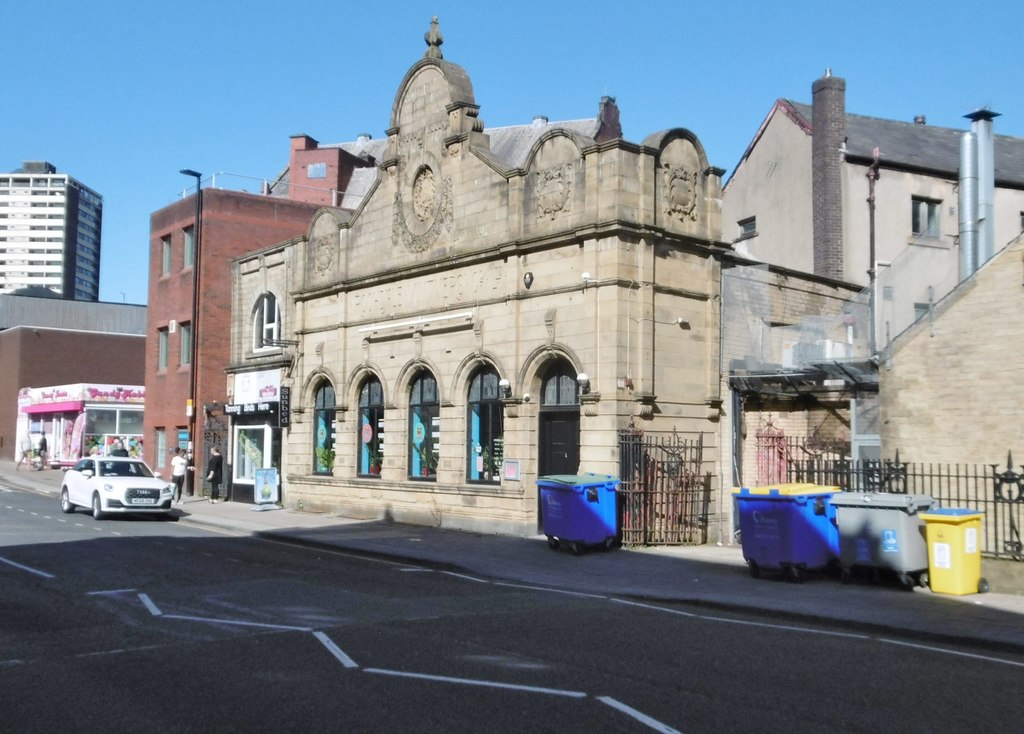
- The Newgate façade in 2019

- Location within Greater Manchester
- Former names: Yates's Wine Lodge; Blue Lounge

General information
- Status: Converted to commercial use
- Type: Hotel and public house (former)
- Location: 3–5 Yorkshire Street, Rochdale, Greater Manchester, England
- Coordinates: 53.6170°N 2.1586°W
- Years built: 1745; 281 years ago (Yorkshire Street frontage); 1911; 115 years ago (Newgate frontage)

Design and construction
- Designations

Listed Building – Grade II
- Official name: Former Blue Bell Inn
- Designated: 12 February 1985
- Reference no.: 1084228

The Yorkshire Street frontage in 2011, when occupied by the Blue Lounge

The Blue Bell Inn is a Grade II listed former public house in Rochdale, Greater Manchester, England. Originally a hotel and later a Yates's Wine Lodge, the building incorporates an 18th-century frontage to Yorkshire Street, dated 1745, and an Edwardian frontage to Newgate bearing the inscription "Wine Lodge 1911". A blue plaque states that the inn was one of only four pubs recorded in the 1626 Manor Survey of Rochdale. The building is now in commercial use.

== History ==
The building, originally the Blue Bell hotel and later a Yates's Wine Lodge, incorporates frontages to both Yorkshire Street and Newgate, the former dated 1745 on a rainwater head and the latter bearing the inscription "Wine Lodge 1911".

A blue plaque on the building states that the Blue Bell was one of only four public houses listed in the 1626 Manor Survey of Rochdale. It further states that the inn, rebuilt in 1745, derived its name from a medieval church bell that was traditionally painted blue.

The Rochdale Vintners Company Limited was established in 1893 and had been taken over by Yates's Wine Lodge by 1909. That year, Rochdale Corporation's plans for a new street affected the company's premises at 3–5 Yorkshire Street. In compensation, the company was granted additional land, enabling the building to be extended and provided with a prominent frontage onto Newgate, completed in 1911.

The 1893 and 1910 Ordnance Survey maps show the site as a public house on Yorkshire Street with several unlabelled rear structures. By 1930, the mapping depicts an additional adjoining building facing the widened Newgate.

On 12 February 1985, the Blue Bell Inn was designated a Grade II listed building.

Following its use as a Yates's Wine Lodge, the building accommodated a variety of commercial occupiers, including the Blue Lounge and several restaurant businesses.

== Architecture ==
The building occupies a plot extending between Yorkshire Street and Newgate, with an entrance on each street. The Yorkshire Street section is built of brick with stone detailing and a slate roof, while the Newgate frontage is faced in stone.

The Yorkshire Street elevation has three storeys and five bays and is arranged around a central entrance. It retains some Victorian windows at ground-floor level, together with later alterations including a modern shopfront. Decorative stone surrounds to the windows, an ornamental cornice and a dated lead rainwater head are among its notable external features.

In contrast, the Newgate elevation is a single-storey frontage dating from the early 20th century. It is distinguished by large arched openings, decorative stonework and prominent gables. The name "Rochdale Vintners Wine Co. Ltd." appears across the frontage, while the central gable bears the inscription "Wine Lodge 1911" within an elaborate decorative panel incorporating grapevine motifs.

== See also ==
- Listed buildings in Rochdale
- Listed pubs in Greater Manchester
