= Aidan (disambiguation) =

Aidan is a masculine given name.

Aidan or Aiden may also refer to:

- Aidan of Ferns (6th–7th century), Irish bishop and saint
- Aidan of Lindisfarne (died 651), Irish monk and missionary
- Dakhil Aidan, Mandaean priest from Iraq
- Pamela Aidan, pen name of American fiction writer Pamela Mogen (born 1953)
- Aidan (singer) (born 1999), Maltese singer and songwriter
- "Aidan" (The Inside episode)
- Aiden (band), an American punk rock band
- Aedan (film), a 2017 Indian Malayalam film

== See also ==
- St. Aidan's (disambiguation)
- Aydın, a city in and the seat of Aydın Province in Turkey's Aegean Region
- Aodhan (singer), an Australian indie musician
