= Reed Hotel =

Listed former pub in Rochdale, Greater Manchester, England

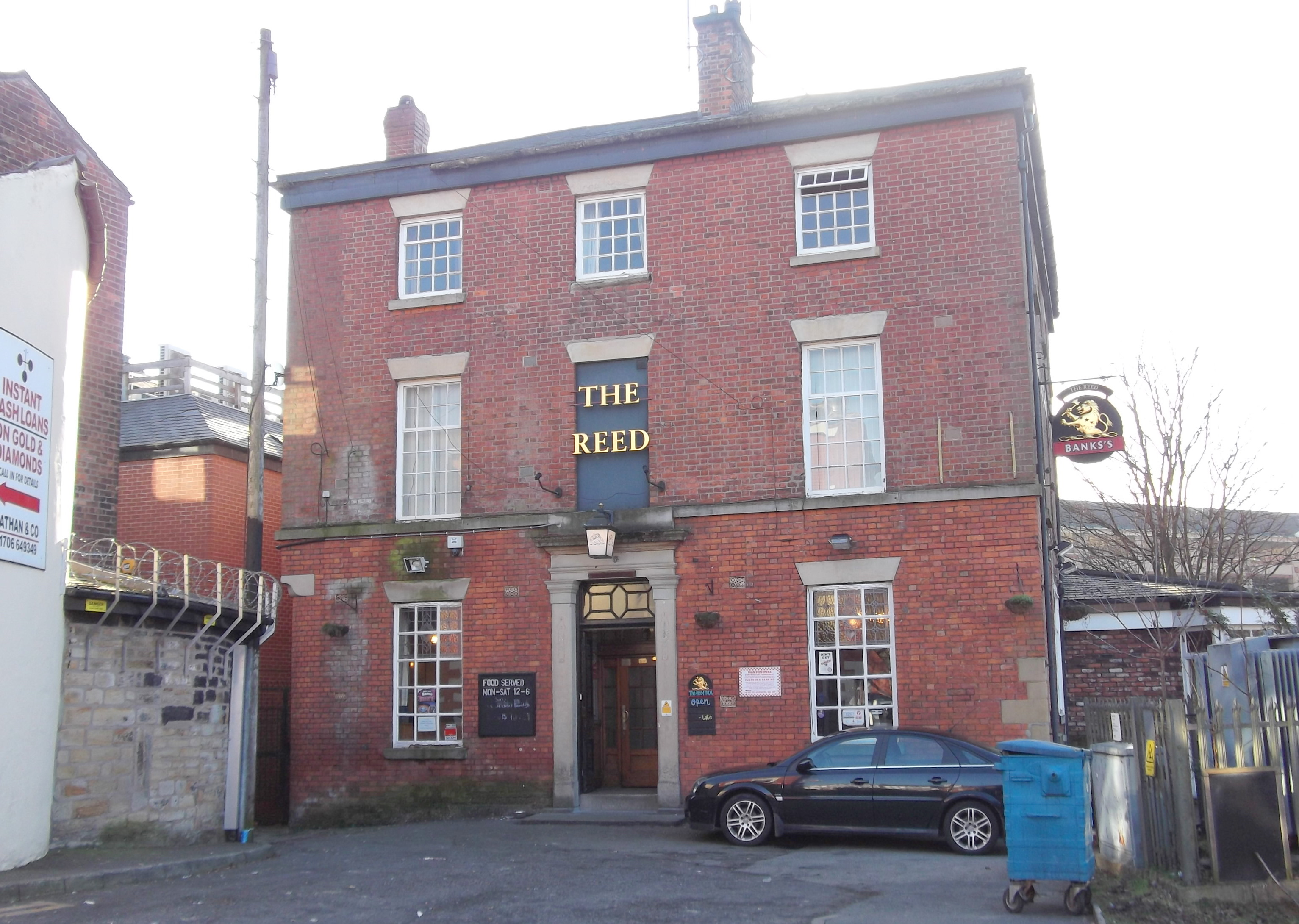
- The pub in 2011

- Location within Greater Manchester
- Alternative names: The Reed

General information
- Status: Derelict
- Type: Public house (former)
- Location: 1 Reed Hill, Rochdale, Greater Manchester, England
- Coordinates: 53.6188°N 2.1572°W
- Year built: Late 18th century
- Closed: 2024

Design and construction
- Designations

Listed Building – Grade II
- Official name: The Reed Hotel
- Designated: 12 February 1985
- Reference no.: 1038323

The Reed Hotel is a Grade II listed former public house on Reed Hill in Rochdale, Greater Manchester, England. Built in the late 18th century as a hotel, it operated as a pub until its closure in 2024. Proposals have since been submitted to convert the building to residential use.

== History ==
The building was constructed in the late 18th century as a hotel, according to its official listing. The 1893 Ordnance Survey map shows the building but does not indicate a designation or name, while the 1910 edition marks it as a public house but does not attribute a name.

On 12 February 1985, the Reed Hotel was designated a Grade II listed building. The pub closed in April 2024, and a scheme put forward that December proposed converting the building into eight one‑bedroom flats and two two‑bedroom flats across its four floors. An accompanying listed building consent application includes changes to the windows on all sides, removal of an external staircase, construction of a single‑storey extension at the rear on the west side, and excavation to create lightwells.

== Architecture ==
The building is constructed in brick with stone detailing and has a slate roof. It is arranged two rooms across and two deep, with a doorway in the centre. The front has three bays and rises three storeys above a basement, all beneath a hipped roof. The entrance includes a cast‑iron panel above the door and is framed by pilasters with a small cornice. The ground‑floor corner on the left is rounded, with a shaped stone support carrying the brickwork above, while the right‑hand corner is finished with stone blocks. The windows have stone lintels and sills, and the first floor has a continuous sill band with a blind window in the middle.

== See also ==
- Listed buildings in Rochdale
- Listed pubs in Greater Manchester
