= Alex Lilley =

English cricketer (born 1992)

Personal information
- Full name: Alexander Edward Lilley
- Born: 17 April 1992 (age 34); Halifax, Yorkshire, England
- Nickname: Lills, BDL, Pythagoras
- Batting: Right-handed
- Bowling: Left arm medium-fast
- Role: All-rounder

Domestic team information
- Years: Team
- 2011: Yorkshire
- 2014–2016: Leeds/Bradford MCCU
- FC debut: 27 April 2011 Yorkshire v Durham MCCU
- Last FC: 7 April 2014 Leeds/Bradford MCCU v Somerset

Career statistics
Competition	First-class
Matches	6
Runs scored	95
Batting average	31.66
100s/50s	0/1
Top score	51*
Balls bowled	798
Wickets	15
Bowling average	27.46
5 wickets in innings	1
10 wickets in match	0
Best bowling	5/41
Catches/stumpings	2/–
- Source: Cricinfo, 7 April 2016

Alex Lilley (born Alexander Edward Lilley, 17 April 1992, Halifax, Yorkshire, England) is an English first-class cricketer. A left arm medium-fast pace bowler and right-handed batsman, Lilley was formerly contracted to Yorkshire County Cricket Club, for whom he played one first-class match in 2011.

Lilley attended St. Aidan's C of E High School in Harrogate. He has been with Yorkshire since 2007, and has played for the Yorkshire Academy in the Yorkshire ECB County Premier League, and the Yorkshire Second XI in the Second XI Championship, as well as appearing in one first-class match for Yorkshire against Durham UCCE in April 2011, when he was dismissed without scoring, and took no wickets for 34 runs when bowling. In September 2011, Yorkshire County Cricket Club announced that Lilley had been awarded a 'summer contract'. He has also played first-class cricket for Leeds/Bradford MCCU.

Lilley played club cricket in Melbourne, Australia in 2011 for the Mont Albert Cricket Club, where he took a competition leading 37 wickets for the season. He was released by Yorkshire County Cricket Club midway through the 2013 season.

Lilley is eligible to represent either England or Ireland internationally.
