= Listed buildings in Rochdale =

Rochdale is a town in the Metropolitan Borough of Rochdale, Greater Manchester, England, and it is unparished. The town and the surrounding countryside contain 139 listed buildings that are recorded in the National Heritage List for England. Of these, four are listed at Grade I, the highest of the three grades, four are at Grade II*, the middle grade, and the others are at Grade II, the lowest grade.

Until the coming of the Industrial Revolution the area was largely rural and agricultural, and some of the agricultural buildings were grouped into settlements known as folds. Most of the earlier listed buildings are houses and associated structures, farmhouses and farm buildings. Industry came in the form of textiles, both wool and cotton, and it was initially carried out in domestic premises, and many of the listed buildings of this time are houses, often with three storeys and rows of multi-light mullioned weavers' workshop windows on the upper floors. The Rochdale Canal passes through the town, and some of the bridges and locks associated with it are listed. The Co-operative movement originated in the town, and its first shop, now a museum, is listed. The other listed buildings include churches and items in churchyards, public houses, banks, a market cross, textile mills, the entrance to the cemetery, a school, public buildings, statues, bridges, and war memorials.

== Key ==
Grade	Criteria
I	Buildings of exceptional interest, sometimes considered to be internationally important
II*	Particularly important buildings of more than special interest
II	Buildings of national importance and special interest

== Buildings ==
Name and location	Photograph	Date	Notes	Grade
St Chad's Church; 53.61477°N 2.15775°W		13th century	The oldest part of the church is the lower part of the tower, and most of the body of the church dates from the 14th–16th centuries. In 1854–55 Joseph Clarke rebuilt the nave roof and the north aisle, in 1873 W. H. Crossland added the porch and the top stage of the tower, with gargoyles carved by Thomas Earp, and 1884–85 the chancel was rebuilt and extended by J. S. Crowther, again with carvings by Earp. The older parts of the church are in gritstone, the later work is in sandstone, and the roof is in slate and copper. The church consists of a nave with a clerestory, north and south aisles, a south porch, a chancel with north and south chapels, and a west tower. The tower has three stages, angle buttresss, and an embattled parapet with crocketed pinnacles. The parapets of the body of the church are also embattled and have crocketed pinnacles.	II*
Rochdale Bridge; 53.61683°N 2.15811°W		Medieval	The bridge, which carries a road over the River Roch, was extended to the east in 1667, there were further extensions to both sides in the 18th century, and to the east in 1821, and it was restored in 2015–16. The bridge is in sandstone, the medieval part has two semicircular arches and a central pointed arch, the 18th-century extension has three semicircular arches with pilasters and cutwaters, and the 1821 extension has three flattened segmental arches.	II
Hill House; 53.61090°N 2.18676°W	—	1609	A rendered stone house that has a tiled roof with coped gables, and two storeys. There is a main range, a later cross-wing to the right, a parallel rear wing, and a garage extension. In the angle is a porch that has a doorway with a chamfered surround and a dated and initialled lintel, and the windows are mullioned.	II
Smallshaw Farmhouse; 53.63979°N 2.19299°W	—	1622	A stone farmhouse on a plinth with quoins and a stone-slate roof. There are two storeys, three bays, and a lean-to extension to the left. On the front is a two-storey porch, the upper floor slightly jettied, with a moulded opening and a dated and initialled lintel. The windows are mullioned and those on the ground floor have hood moulds with spiral stops.	II
Sundial, Ashworth Hall; 53.61566°N 2.22824°W	—	1641	The sundial is in the courtyard of Ashworth Hall. It is in stone and consists of an octagonal baluster on a pedestal. On the top is a copper dial and gnomon.	II
Thrum Hall Cottages; 53.63444°N 2.16817°W	—	1650	A stone house, at one time three cottages, with quoins and a stone-slate roof. There are two storeys, three bays, and an outshut and a gabled wing at the rear. In the centre is a doorway with a chamfered surround and a Tudor arched dated and initialled lintel, the windows are mullioned, and in the right gable end is a porch.	II
Oakenrod Hall; 53.61384°N 2.17420°W	—	c. 1650	A wing was added in the early 18th century, and other wings later. The house is in stone with one of the rear wings in brick, and a stone-slate roof. There are two storeys, a main range of five bays, a protruding left wing, rear wings to the right, and diagonally to the left. The porch has a coped gable, and the windows are mullioned.	II
22 and 24 Lower Tenterfield; 53.62743°N 2.21783°W	—	Mid-17th century	A farmhouse, later divided into two dwellings, it is in stone with a stone-slate roof, and two storeys. The house was extended in 1777, making the original part a cross-wing. The original part is on a plinth, it has quoins, two bays, mullioned windows with hood moulds, and a taking-in door in the left side. The later part also has two bays, a central doorway with monolithic jambs, mullioned windows, a datestone, and a blocked taking-in door in the right gable end.	II
32, 34 and 36 Falinge Fold; 53.62564°N 2.16966°W	—	Mid-17th century	A stone house and byre, later two cottages, and a brick extension added to the left in about 1800. There is a stone-slate roof, two storeys and four bays. The doorway on the front has a chamfered surround and a slightly pointed lintel. The windows in the original part are mullioned and in the extension they are sashes. Inside are remnants of timber framed cross-walls.	II
246, 248 and 250 Edenfield Road; 53.62210°N 2.18336°W	—	Mid-17th century	Originally one house, later divided into three, it is in stone with quoins and a slate roof. There are two storeys, and each house has one bay. The doorways have monolithic jambs, the windows are mullioned, and above the ground floor windows is a continuous hood mould.	II
Schofield Farm and The Three Owls Bird Sanctuary; 53.62534°N 2.22094°W	—	Mid-17th century	The house and the barn at the rear, which has since been used for other purposes, are in stone with quoins and a stone-slate roof. The house has two storeys, two bays, and a central doorway. The windows are mullioned, including a ten-light workshop window on the upper floor. The barn has a semicircular cart entrance flanked by doors.	II
Ashworth Hall; 53.61563°N 2.22805°W	—	17th century	A house, possibly with an earlier core, divided into three dwellings. It is mainly in stone on a stone plinth, with some brick, stone dressings, and a stone-slate roof. It has a rectangular plan, three storeys with attics and a basement, and five bays. The main door opens into an enclosed courtyard, and has panelled pilasters, a three-pane fanlight, and a hood. The windows vary; some are casements and others are sashes, and in the south gable is a mullioned window.	II
Sand Hole Farmhouse; 53.58963°N 2.15627°W	—	17th century	The house is in sandstone, partly rendered, with a roof partly of Welsh slate and partly of stone flags. There are two storeys, a central doorway with a modern lean-to porch, and a projecting west wing. The windows are mullioned, some with hood moulds.	II
Ellenrod Farmhouse; 53.62817°N 2.19115°W	—	Late 17th century	The farmhouse was refronted in the late 19th century. It is in stone on a plinth, with quoins and a stone-slate roof. There are two storeys and two bays, with central doorways at the front and rear. The jambs and head of the rear doorway are moulded, and most of the windows are mullioned.	II
Manor Farmhouse; 53.62481°N 2.22141°W	—	Late 17th century	Originally a chapel, later a private house, it is in stone on a plinth, with quoins and a stone-slate roof. There are two storeys, two bays, and mullioned windows, some with hood moulds.	II
Wolstenholme Fold Farmhouse and barn 53.62564°N 2.22138°W	—	Late 17th century	The barn is dated 1721, and has been incorporated into the house, and the building is in stone with slate roofs. The house has two storeys and two bays, the barn is at right angles to the left, there is a single-storey wing to the right, and an outshut to the left. The doorway has monolithic jambs and lintel, and the windows are mullioned. In the former barn is a semicircular opening with a dated keystone.	II
6, 8 and 10 Harridge Street; 53.63454°N 2.17930°W	—	1678	Originally one house with cross-wings, later three cottages, they are in stone on a projecting plinth with quoins and a stone-slate roof. There are two storeys and a rear outshut. The main doorway has a chamfered porch and a dated and initialled lintel, and the doorway to the left has chamfered jambs and a flattened triangular head. Some of the windows are mullioned, and others are replacements.	II
Stocks; 53.61446°N 2.15741°W		1688	The stocks were moved to their present location at the entrance to the churchyard of St Chad's Church in 1891. They consist of stone stock-ends with chamfered corners, semicircular heads and an inscription, and contain replaced timber foot restraints and benches.	II
Fern Hill First Farmhouse; 53.63458°N 2.19414°W	—	1691	The main range was added at right angles in the 18th century, making the original part a cross-wing. The farmhouse is in stone and has a stone-slate roof with coped gables. The cross-wing is on a plinth, and has quoins and mullioned windows. The later part has a doorway with square-cut jambs and a lintel. To the right is a projecting single-storey porch with an ogee-shaped lintel and a panel above. The mullions have been removed from the windows.	II
Fisherfield Farmhouse; 53.63024°N 2.19094°W	—	1692	A stone farmhouse on a plinth, with quoins and a stone-slate roof. There are two storeys, two bays, and an aisle at the rear. The doorway has a chamfered surround, and a slightly pointed lintel with initials and a date. The windows are mullioned, those on the ground floor having hood moulds with spiral stops.	II
Bank House Farmhouse; 53.63196°N 2.20494°W	—	1694	A stone farmhouse on a plinth, with quoins, and a stone-slate roof with coped gables. There are two storeys and three bays. There are two doorways with monolithic jambs and lintels. The windows are mullioned, those on the upper floor having hood moulds with spiral stops. In the right gable is a dovecote, and at the rear is a cross-window and a window with a semicircular head.	II
Lloyd's Bank; 53.61738°N 2.15868°W		1708	A hotel on a corner site, later a bank, it is in brick with a stone ground floor and dressings and a roof in slate and copper. There are three storeys, four bays on Yorkshire Street, two on former Lord Street, and a curved bay on the corner. The ground floor is rusticated and contains windows and a doorway on the corner, all with flat heads voussoirs and keystones. The upper floor have fluted Ionic pilasters between the bays, which contain flat-headed windows with architraves and keystones. Below the windows on the middle floor are moulded panels, and on the upper floor is blind balustrading. There are stone cornices between the floors, and a timber modillion eaves cornice. On the top is a pitched roof with a dentilled gables, and a balcony flanked by acorn vases on pedestals.	II
Woodhouse East Cottage and attached cottages 53.63058°N 2.21455°W	—	1709	A house with a gabled cross-wing to the left, in stone with quoins and a stone-slate roof. There are two storeys, a main range with three bays, a single-storey extension to the left, and a two-storey rear wing. In the angle is a porch with a coped gable and ball finials, and the windows are mullioned with hood moulds.	II
Duffins Cottage; 53.63286°N 2.17642°W	—	1717	A stone house on a plinth with a stone-slate roof, two storeys, and a lean-to extension at the rear. There is one mullioned window, mullions have been removed from the other windows, and a porch was added in the 20th century.	II
Old Falinge; 53.62513°N 2.17075°W	—	1721	A stone house, originally with three bays, a bay was added to the left in the 18th century, and a rear wing in brick. It has two storeys with attics, a modillion eaves cornice, and a stone-slate roof with coped gables. The doorway has a moulded surround and an initialled and dated lintel, and the windows are mullioned and transomed.	II
Crossfield Farm and Cottage; 53.63890°N 2.17340°W	—	1723	A farmhouse, later divided into two dwellings, it is in stone with a stone-slate roof and has two storeys. The building has a main range, a cross-wing to the right forming the cottage, and a former separate outbuilding to the left incorporated into the house, and joined to it by a single-storey passage. Most of the windows are mullioned.	II
Rochdale Museum, The Old Vicarage; 53.61455°N 2.15853°W		c. 1724	The vicarage, later used as a museum, was altered in about 1820. It is in brick with a stone basement, stone dressings quoins, a wooden modillion eaves cornice, and has roofs of stone-slate and 20th-century tiles. The main block has two storeys with attics and two basement storeys, a front of five bays, a two-bay extension to the left and a gabled single-storey extension to the right. The doorway has a fanlight and a segmental hood with a carved shell and a cherub on console brackets. The windows are ashes with keystones, and there is a square bay window in the left extension. At the rear are re-used mullioned windows and a stair bay.	II
Fern Hill Cottage; 53.63455°N 2.19450°W	—	Early 18th century	A stone cottage on a plinth, with quoins, a stone-slate roof, two storeys and two bays. On the front is a large gabled porch with a chamfered doorway and an owl hole. On the front are mullioned windows, and at the sides and rear they have been replaced by 20th-century casements.	II
Egerton Arms; 53.62138°N 2.22739°W		Early to mid-18th century	The former public house is in stone on a plinth, with quoins and a stone-slate roof. It has a double-depth plan and two storeys, and the windows are mullioned. (Note: Street View in June 2012 shows that the building has been converted into a private house.)	II
Former Blue Bell Inn; 53.61690°N 2.15886°W		1745	A former hotel and Yates Wine Lodge that was later extended, with the original part facing Yorkshire Street, and the later part, dated 1911, facing Newgate. The building has a cranked plan and a slate roof. The Yorkshire Street face is in brick with stone dressings, a modillion eaves cornice, three storeys, five bays, a central doorway, a shop front to the right, and elsewhere are sash windows with keystones. The Newgate face is in ashlar stone and in Edwardian Baroque style. It has a single storey, five bays, a doorway in the right bay, and semicircular-headed windows in the other bays, all with keystones. There are three gables with semicircular pediments, the largest gable above the central three bays. The pediments contain cartouches, below them is an inscribed frieze, and flanking this are four pilasters.	II
Ashworth Fold Farmhouse; 53.61559°N 2.22886°W	—	Mid-18th century	A stone farmhouse that has a stone-slate roof with stone ridge tiles. There is a double-depth plan, two storeys, three bays, and a single-story lean-to at the rear. It has a central doorway and mullioned windows.	II
Barn to north of Ashworth Fold Farmhouse; 53.61624°N 2.22847°W	—	Mid-18th century	The long barn and associated buildings are partly in stone and partly in brick, they have roofs partly in slate and partly in stone-slate, and there are two parallel ranges. The openings, some of which are blocked, include a segmental-headed cart entry with voussoirs and a keystone, a semicircular-headed barn door, square pitching holes, windows and other cart entries, and an owl hole in the right gable.	II
Ashworth Hall Estate Cottages and barn 53.61573°N 2.22847°W		18th century	A pair of cottages and a barn in stone with brick at the rear, evidence of timber framing, and stone-slate roofs. Between the cottages is an arched entrance to Ashworth Hall. The cottages have quoins, two storeys, two bays each, doorways with monolithic jambs, casement windows, and an ornate ball finial. The barn to the right has two cart openings with a lean-to between, a cow house with a hay loft above, circular pitching holes with moulded architraves, ventilation slots, and an owl hole.	II
Market Cross; 53.61530°N 2.15786°W	—	18th century (probable)	The market cross is in stone and consists of a tall shaft on a moulded base. On the top are a cornice and a ball finial replacing the original cross.	II
Healey Hall; 53.63859°N 2.18064°W	—	1774	A country house in ashlar stone with a sill band, a cornice, a parapet, and a hipped roof. It has two storeys and a front of seven bays, a single-storey wing to the side, and a rear wing. In the centre is a doorway with Roman Doric attached columns, an entablature, a frieze, and a pediment with carving in the tympanum. The door has a semicircular head, a fanlight and a keystone. Above the central three bays is a pediment with an armorial in the tympanum. At the rear is a Palladian window and dormers.	II
128 Yorkshire Street; 53.61946°N 2.15464°W	—	Late 18th century	A house, later used as offices, and altered in about 1900. It is in brick at the front with quoins, sandstone at the rear, and has a slate roof. There are two storeys, two bays, and a 19th-century extension. In the centre is a doorway with an architrave, a frieze and a cornice. On the upper floor of the right bay is a canted oriel window, and at the rear is a canted bay window; the other windows are sashes.	II
Falinge Park Hall façade and pavilions 53.62360°N 2.16500°W		Late 18th century	All that remains of a country house are its façade, one bay of each side wall, flanking pavilions, and passages joining them to the side walls, all in ashlar stone. The façade has a plinth, bands, a modillion cornice, a parapet, and a pediment with a floral cartouche in relief. There are two storeys and five bays, the middle three bays projecting under a pediment, and a central Ionic porch with two detached columns, four pilasters, an entablature, and a fanlight. The linking passages have three bays, the central bay containing a door with an architrave, and the outer bays with arched recesses. The pavilions each has a three-light window with Doric pilasters, an elliptical tympanum, a cornice, a parapet, and a hipped roof.	II
Mount Cottage; 53.63629°N 2.17938°W	—	Late 18th century	The house was extended to the right in the mid-19th century, it is in stone with stone-slate roofs, and has two storeys. The original part has three bays, an eaves frieze, and a cornice. The central doorway has a moulded architrave, and the windows are sashes. The extension is taller with three bays, the first bay projects and contains a rusticated canted bay window with a parapet. The other bays have an arched carriage entry and sash windows, and at the rear is a stair window.	II
The Reed Hotel; 53.61883°N 2.15724°W		Late 18th century	A public house in brick with stone dressings and a hipped slate roof. It has a square plan, with three storeys and a basement, and three bays on each front. The central doorway has pilaster, a cornice and a fanlight, and the windows are sashes with wedge lintels.	II
Sundial, St Chad's Church; 53.61445°N 2.15790°W	—	1783	The sundial is in the churchyard of St Chad's Church. It is in stone and consists of a baluster shaft on a circular plinth. The dial is missing.	II
33 and 35 Broad Lane and boundary wall 53.59892°N 2.14292°W		1787	A pair of stone houses with quoins, sill bands, and a stone-slate roof. They have a double-depth plan, three storeys and one bay each. The doorways on the right have monolithic jambs and lintels. The windows are mullioned; on the ground floor the window has three lights, and on the upper floors there are six- and eight-light workshop windows. To the right is a wall constructed from large sandstone flags set into the ground and joined by circular metal plates bolted together. The stones are about 1.75 metres (5 ft 9 in) tall, and the wall that surrounds a triangular garden is about 80 metres (260 ft) long.	II
St James' Church, Ashworth; 53.62142°N 2.22697°W		1789	A stone church with quoins and a stone-slate roof with a cross finial. It has a rectangular plan with a small north vestry. At the west end are two semicircular-arched doorways with square jambs, a keystone and a fanlight. There are two tiers of windows with semicircular heads, impost blocks, and keystones, containing Y-tracery, and the east window has three lights.	II
61–73 Broad Lane; 53.59931°N 2.14147°W	—	c. 1790	A terrace of seven stone houses, possibly originally back-to-back houses, with sill bands, and a stone-slate roof. They have a double-depth plan, three storeys and one bay each. The doorways on the right have monolithic jambs and lintels. The windows are mullioned; on the ground floor they have three or four lights, and on the upper storeys are multi-light workshop windows.	II
Standrings House; 53.62132°N 2.19857°W	—	1791	A stone house with quoins and a stone-slate roof. It has two storeys, two bays, a parallel rear range for part of its length, and a single-storey porch. The windows are mullioned.	II
170, 172 and 174 Yorkshire Street; 53.62016°N 2.15264°W	—	1793	The house was extended in about 1830, and has since been converted into flats. It is in brick with stone dressings and hipped slate roofs. There are two storeys, a main block of five bays on a stone plinth, with a one-bay extension to the right and a three-bay extension to the left. The doorway in the centre of the main block has a Roman Doric doorcase with a fanlight and an open pediment. In the extensions, the doors have semicircular heads, fanlights, consoles, and consoles. The windows are sashes with flat brick arches.	II
Coppy Bridge; 53.61749°N 2.12715°W		Between 1794 and 1804	The bridge, No. 57 over the Rochdale Canal, carries a road. It is in stone, and consists of a single elliptical arch, with a band, a keystone, and a coped parapet.	II
Lock No. 49 (Moss Upper Lock); 53.60828°N 2.14431°W		Between 1794 and 1804	The lock is in dressed stone and has double lower-gates. The winding gear remains on one side.	II
Lock No. 50 (Moss Lower Lock); 53.60771°N 2.14722°W		Between 1794 and 1804	The lock is in dressed stone and has double lower-gates. The mouth has cast iron lipping.	II
Lock No. 52 and towpath bridge 53.58924°N 2.17821°W		Between 1794 and 1804	The lock is in dressed stone and has double upper-gates. At the south is a roving bridge with a single segmental arch.	II
Lock No. 53; 53.58762°N 2.17835°W		Between 1794 and 1804	The lock is in dressed stone and has cast iron lipping on the mouth. It is no longer in use.	II
Owd Betts public house 53.64065°N 2.25909°W		1796	A farmhouse, later a public house, in stone with a slate roof. There are two storeys, three bays, an outshut to the rear right, and a 20th-century rear extension. On the front is a 20th-century porch with monolithic jambs and lintel. The windows are mullioned, some containing casements and others sashes.	II
31 Broad Lane; 53.59893°N 2.14304°W		c. 1800	A stone house with quoins, sill bands, and a stone-slate roof. It has a double-depth plan, three storeys and one bay. The doorway on the right has monolithic jambs and lintel. The windows are mullioned; on the ground floor the window has three lights with sliding sashes, and on the upper floors there are eight-light workshop windows.	II
31 Toad Lane; 53.61869°N 2.15937°W		c. 1800	Originally a house, then in 1844 converted to become the first shop in the Co-operative movement, and subsequently a museum. It is in brick with stone dressings and a stone-slate roof, hipped at the front, and gabled at the rear. There are three storeys and three bays. On the ground floor is a central doorway flanked by bay windows, and on the upper floors are sash windows with wedge lintels.	II
75 and 77 Broad Lane; 53.59942°N 2.14120°W	—	c. 1800	A pair of stone houses with a stone-slate roof. They have a double-depth plan, three storeys and one bay each. The doorways have stone surrounds, fanlights and cornices. The windows were originally mullioned; on the ground floor they have been replaced by sashes, and on the upper floors some lights have been blocked.	II
144–148 Syke Road; 53.63554°N 2.15337°W	—	c. 1800	A row of five stone cottages with quoins, and a roof mainly of stone-slate and some tiles. There are two storeys, a double-depth plan, and each cottage has one bay. The doorways have square-cut jambs and lintels, and the windows are mullioned.	II
149 and 150 Syke Road; 53.63564°N 2.15346°W	—	c. 1800	A pair of stone cottages with a slate roof, a double-depth plan, two storeys, and one bay each. The doorways have monolithic jambs and lintels, and the windows are mullioned.	II
188A, 190, 190A, 192, and 194 Yorkshire Street; 53.62061°N 2.15210°W	—	c. 1800	A terrace of brick houses with stone dressings and a stone-slate roof, later converted into flats. They have a double-depth plan, three storeys, and a total of nine bays. Each doorway has a stuccoed surround and cornice, and a fanlight. The windows are sashes with brick arches, keystones, and stone sills. At the rear of No. 190 is a two-storey octagonal bay window.	II
190, 191 and 192 Dewhirst Road; 53.63819°N 2.15557°W	—	c. 1800	A row of three stone houses with a roof partly of stone-slate and partly of 20th-century tiles. They have a double-depth plan, three storeys, and one bay each. The doorways have square-cut jambs and lintels. One bay window has been inserted, and the other windows are mullioned, those on the upper two floors being multi-light workshop windows.	II
303, 305, and 305a Milnrow Road; 53.61601°N 2.13303°W	—	c. 1800	A pair of stone houses with a slate roof, three storeys and a double-depth plan. No. 303 has one bay, No. 305 has three, and the doorways have square-cut monolithic jambs and lintels. On the ground floor are square windows, and the upper floors contain multi-light workshop windows. At the rear are similar windows, quoins, and an arched carriage entry with voussoirs.	II
532 and 534 Edenfield Road; 53.62261°N 2.19709°W	—	c. 1800	A pair of stone cottages with a stone-slate roof. They have three storeys, and each cottage has one bay. The doorways have square-cut surrounds, and the windows are mullioned, those on the upper two floors being five and seven-light workshop windows.	II
Former Royds Bank; 53.61745°N 2.15723°W		c. 1800	The bank originated as single-bay building which was extended in Greek Revival style in 1879, and redesigned and refronted in Neoclassical style in 1913–14. The original building is in brick, the 1879 extension in sandstone, and the refronting in Portland stone; the roof is slated. The main block has two storeys and five bays on a plinth with rusticated quoins. At the top is a dentilled eaves cornice with a parapet and a central pediment containing a carved eagle in relief. At the front is a semicircular porch with Ionic columns and a deep entablature. On the ground floor are rectangular windows with moulded frames and keystones, and the windows on the upper floor have triangular pediments.	II
Bamford United Reformed Church; 53.60927°N 2.21376°W		1801	The chapel is the earlier, the Sunday school was added in 1861; both are in stone with slate roofs, and the chapel has a chancel extension in brick. The chapel has three coped gables and a gabled porch, with buttresses between the gables rising to pinnacles. The windows are lancets with hood moulds, and the doorway has a four-centred arched head. The school has quoins and mullioned and transomed windows. Inside the chapel is a gallery on three sides.	II
Dukes Restaurant and Nightclub; 53.61693°N 2.15629°W	—	1810	Originally a hotel, the building is in brick on a stone plinth, with stone dressings, cornices between the floors, a modillion eaves cornice, and a slate roof. It has a double-depth plan, three storeys, five bays and a wider bay at the right. In the third bay is a doorway with an Ionic doorcase and a pediment, and in the sixth bay is a wider entrance with four Ionic pilasters and an entablature. The windows are sashes with architraves, and those on the ground floor also have pulvinated friezes.	II
Hope Chapel and Parson's House; 53.62177°N 2.15804°W		1810	The chapel was extended in 1848. It is in brick, partly rendered, with stone dressings and a slate roof, and has two storeys and three bays on a stone plinth. There are two tiers of arched windows with moulded architraves and keystones. The attached parson's house has three storeys and two bays and a hipped roof.	II*
36 Meanwood Brow; 53.62238°N 2.17499°W	—	c. 1810	A stone house with quoins and a stone-slate roof. It has a double-depth plan, two storeys, one bay, and a rear outshut. The doorway and windows have square-cut monolithic jambs and lintels, and the windows are mullioned, including a seven-light workshop window on the upper floor.	II
107 and 109 Halifax Road; 53.62671°N 2.14269°W	—	c. 1810	Originally four back-to-back houses, later converted into two houses, they are in brick with stone dressings and a stone-slate roof. There are three storeys and basements, and each house has one bay. Steps with railings lead up to the doorways that have monolithic jambs and lintels. The windows have been altered, but on the top floor are five-light former workshop windows.	II
151 and 152 Syke Road; 53.63581°N 2.15350°W	—	c. 1810	A pair of stone cottages with quoins, a band, and a slate roof. They have a double-depth plan, and two storeys. No. 151 has two bays and No. 152 has one, and the windows are mullioned.	II
153 and 154 Syke Road; 53.63589°N 2.15352°W	—	c. 1810	A pair of stone cottages with a slate roof, a double-depth plan, and two storeys. Each cottage has two bays, and there is a garage extension to No. 154. The central doorways have monolithic jambs and lintels. The windows were all mullioned, including workshop windows, but some have been altered.	II
394, 396, 398 and 400 Shawclough Road; 53.63565°N 2.17940°W	—	c. 1810	A row of four stone houses with moulded eaves brackets, and a stone-slate roof. Each house has a double-depth plan, three storeys, one bay, and some have basements. The doorways have square-cut monolithic surrounds, and a square window on the ground floor. On the upper floor the windows are mullioned and contain casements.	II
32 and 34 Meanwood Brow; 53.62231°N 2.17496°W	—	c. 1815	A pair of stone cottages with quoins and a stone-slate roof. They have a double-depth plan, three storeys, and one bay each. The top floor is reached by external steps, and in the centre of the front is a doorway with square-cut monolithic jambs. The windows on the ground floor are sashes, and on the top floor are three and four-light mullioned workshop windows.	II
Castle Hill House; 53.61213°N 2.16522°W		c. 1820	The house is on the site of the former Rochdale Castle. It has a cubic shape, and is in ashlar stone on a plinth, with a sill band, a cornice, a parapet, and a hipped slate roof. The house is in Neoclassical style, with two storeys, and three bays on each front. In the entrance front is a Doric doorway with flanking columns and entablature. The windows are sashes, and in the centre of the entrance front is a pediment containing a plain shield and a scroll.	II
Ukrainian Catholic Church of Saint Mary; 53.62040°N 2.15341°W		1821	Originally the Anglican Church of St James, later a Roman Catholic church, it is stone with a slate roof. The church consists of a nave, a small chancel with a north vestry, and a west tower flanked by porches. The tower has three stages, buttresses rising to crocketed pinnacles, clock faces, and an embattled parapet. Along the sides of the nave are buttresses, an embattled parapet, and windows in Perpendicular style.	II
Thrum Hall; 53.63408°N 2.16902°W	—	1823	The house is in stone with a hipped stone roof, and is in Italianate style. It has a square plan, two storeys and three bays. On the front is a Doric porch, end pilasters with carved hieroglyphics, a sill band, and projecting stone eaves. The windows are sashes.	II
1 and 3 Whitehall Street and 20 East Gate Street; 53.61983°N 2.15480°W	—	Early 19th century	A pair of houses, later offices, on a stone plinth, in brick with stone dressings, a modillion eaves cornice, and a hipped slate roof. They have three storeys, seven bays on Whitehall Street, three on Yorkshire Street, and four on East Gate Street, where there is a two-storey rear extension to No. 1. The doorways have pilasters, fanlights, and cornices, and the windows are sashes with wedge lintels.	II
17 Milnrow Road; 53.61405°N 2.15157°W	—	Early 19th century	A house and former workshop is sandstone, with a rectangular plan, canted on the east side. There are three storeys and a symmetrical front of three bays. The central doorway has a moulded canopy, and is flanked by shop windows. On the middle floor are three rectangular windows, and the top floor contains a ten-light mullioned window.	II
24 Baron Street; 53.61511°N 2.15319°W	—	Early 19th century	A house with a workshop behind in red brick with slate roofs, forming an L-shaped plan. The house has two storeys and a basement and two bays. The doorway has a plain architrave and the windows have wedge lintels. The workshop has a single storey and extends to the right.	II
101 Syke Road; 53.63354°N 2.15212°W	—	Early 19th century	A weaver's cottage in sandstone with a stone slate roof. There are two storeys, a double-depth plan, and one bay. On the ground floor is a doorway with a plain surround, and a three-light casement window. The top floor contains a line of weavers' windows, and at the rear is a pair of French windows.	II
102 Syke Road; 53.63360°N 2.15212°W	—	Early 19th century	A weaver's cottage in sandstone, rendered at the rear, with a stone slate roof. There are two storeys and a basement, a double-depth plan, and one bay. On the ground floor is a doorway with a plain surround, and a two-light sash window with a keystone. The top floor contains a line of weavers' windows; in the basement is a three-light mullioned window, and at the rear is a pair of French windows.	II
132 Drake Street; 53.61362°N 2.15465°W	—	Early 19th century	A house, later offices, in brick with a sill band, a modillion eaves cornice, and a stone-slate roof. It has a double-depth plan, two storeys and three bays. The central doorway has attached Tuscan columns, a fanlight and an open pediment, and the windows are sashes.	II
Prickshaw Cottages; 53.64549°N 2.18951°W		Early 19th century	A row of four cottages with stone-slate roofs. The left cottage has three storeys and a basement, and the other cottages have two storeys. The doorway have plain surrounds, and the windows are mullioned.	II
Sundial, Bamford Chapel; 53.60906°N 2.21382°W	—	Early 19th century	The sundial is in the graveyard of Bamford Chapel. It is in stone and has a plain shaft with chamfered corners, spreading out at the top to form a base for the dial. The dial and the gnomon are in metal, and the dial is inscribed.	II
Town Head House; 53.61943°N 2.15415°W	—	Early 19th century	A house, later offices, in brick on a stone plinth, with stone dressings, a band, and a 20th-century roof. There are two storeys with an attic, and a front of three bays. The doorway has attached Doric columns, a fanlight, and an open pediment. In the centre of the upper floor is a window with an architrave and a cornice on consoles. On the left side is a two-storey canted bay window, and on the right side is a five-sided bay window with a pyramidal roof.	II
Waterside House; 53.61609°N 2.15358°W		1820s	Formerly the engine house and warehouse of a woollen mill, the engine house is the earliest part and the rest was added later in the century. The building is in orange brick and sandstone with sandstone dressings, and four parallel hipped slate roofs. There are three storeys and the front and four at the rear, and ten bays. The engine house is in the first bay, which has a rusticated ground floor containing an entrance with a round-headed window above. In the second bay is a round-headed cart entrance with voussoirs, and the seventh bay is occupied by taking-in doors. The doorways and windows on the ground and middle floors have round heads and the windows on the top floor have flat heads.	II
Congregational Church; 53.61389°N 2.15519°W		1829	Originally a Sunday School, the church is in stone with a roof of slate and asphalt. It has a single storey with a basement, and a front of five bays. The doorway has a flat hood, and the windows have square-cut sills and lintels, and monolithic jambs.	II
Halfpenny Bridge; 53.61082°N 2.15067°W		1831	A footbridge, originally a toll bridge, crossing the Rochdale Branch Canal, which is now dry. It consists of a level girder and a slightly segmental-arched girder, with a parapet of cast iron railings with lattice panels. At the west end are three fluted cast iron columns leading to stone steps with rusticated walls. The road bed is paved with York stone.	II
St Clement's Church; 53.62131°N 2.17715°W		1832–1835	The church, designed by Lewis Vulliamy, is in ashlar stone. It consists of a wide nave and a short chancel flanked by small vestries. There is a west door, corner pinnacles, and two lancet windows in each bay. At the east end is a triple lancet with a clock face above, and on the east gable is a bellcote with lancet openings, crocketed gables and a small spire. Inside the church are galleries on three sides.	II
Spotland Bridge New Mill; 53.62090°N 2.17518°W		c. 1833	The original part of the former cotton spinning mill is in brick with a slate roof, coped gables, five storeys and an attic, and 13 bays. At the north end is a square stair and toilet tower, and on the corners are pilasters. At the south end is an engine house and a boiler house, and nearby is a tapering octagonal chimney. Later a two-storey office block was built, and after that, by the 1870s, another mill block was added to the east. This is in Accrington brick with a flat roof, four storeys, and sides of nine and eight bays, and with a sprinkler tower. Also on the site is the manager's house, in gritstone with a slate roof and two storeys.	II
Flagstone wall east of footpath 53.59706°N 2.14331°W	—	Early to mid-19th century	The wall is constructed from large sandstone flags set into the ground and joined by circular metal plates bolted together. The stones are about 1.75 metres (5 ft 9 in) tall and of variable width, and the wall is about 160 metres (520 ft) long.	II
Flagstone wall south of Broad Lane; 53.59873°N 2.14354°W	—	Early to mid-19th century	The wall is constructed from large sandstone flags set into the ground and joined by circular metal plates bolted together. The stones are about 1.75 metres (5 ft 9 in) tall and of variable width, and the wall is about 85 metres (279 ft) long.	II
St Clement's Vicarage; 53.62093°N 2.17736°W	—	1840	The vicarage is in stone with a slate roof. It has a double-depth plan, two storeys, three bays, and an additional range at the rear. The doorway has an elliptical head, side lights and a hood mould, and the windows have chamfered surrounds. There is a bay window in the left return.	II
5 Baillie Street; 53.61774°N 2.15766°W	—	c. 1840	A shop with a sandstone ground floor, brick above, a slate roof, and three storeys. The ground floor has seven bays, and is highly decorated. In the left bay is a deeply recessed round-headed doorway, with a coffered archway, and a central acanthus and a lion's head. To the right is an arcade of six round-headed windows each with a tympanum containing detailed carving. On the upper floors are sash windows with gauged brick lintels, and there is a band between the floors.	II
Christ Church, Healey; 53.63789°N 2.17408°W		1849–50	A Commissioners' church by George Shaw, the chancel and chapel were added in 1853, and the spire, north aisle and vestry in 1861. The church is in stone, and has slate roofs with coped gables and cross finials. It consists of a nave with a clerestory, north and south aisles, a north porch, a chancel with a north vestry and south chapel, all under separate roofs, and a southwest steeple. The steeple has a three-stage tower with a south door and a broach spire. Along the sides of the aisles are buttresses with gablets.	II
Heybrook Mill; 53.62342°N 2.14358°W	—	Mid-19th century	The former woollen mill and associated housing are in gritstone and brick, partly rendered, with slate roofs. The mill has three storeys and seven bays, with loading doors in the sixth bay. The housing is at right angles and consists of four houses with hipped and gabled roofs. Above the doors are fanlights, and the windows vary; some are mullioned, some are sashes, and there are bay windows. On Morley Street is a stone boundary wall with a gateway that has monolithic gate piers with gabled capstones.	II
Old Toll House; 53.62259°N 2.19374°W		19th century	The former toll house is in stone with a slate roof and extensions in brick. It has two storeys, two bays, lean-tos to the right and rear, and extensions to the right and rear, all single-storey. The doorway has a monolithic surround, and the windows are casements.	II
Pig sties north of Ashworth Fold Farmhouse; 53.61566°N 2.22877°W	—	19th century	A pair of pig sties in stone with a stone-slate roof and stone ridge tiles. In front are pens enclosed by walls with triangular coping, the gate posts have triangular heads, and the pens are divided by a stone flag wall.	II
Pig sties southeast of Ashworth Fold Farmhouse; 53.61537°N 2.22865°W	—	19th century	A pair of pig sties in stone with ventilation holes in the gables, moulded eaves gutter brackets, a stone-slate roof, and stone ridge tiles. In front are pens enclosed by walls with triangular coping and partly covered by projecting eaves, the gate posts have triangular heads, and the pens are divided by a stone flag wall.	II
Christ Church Vicarage; 53.63798°N 2.17484°W		1853	The vicarage is in stone on a plinth, with bands, buttresses, and a stone-slate roof. It has two storeys and an L-shaped plan, and a front of three bays. In the second bay is a porch with an arched opening, a hood mould, and a coped gable. Most of the windows are mullioned, some also with transoms, and there is an ornate oriel window in the right gable end.	II
Rochdale Cemetery gateway 53.61329°N 2.18331°W		1855	The gateway is in stone and consists of a central arch and two smaller flanking arches, all with flattened heads. Between the central and side arches are octagonal buttresss with crocketed pinnacles, and outside the outer arches are angle buttresses, also with crocketed pinnacles. Above each arch is a heraldic shield and a scrolled ribbon, and the gables are coped and stepped. The gates are in cast iron.	II
St Paul's Church, Norden; 53.62746°N 2.21332°W		1859–1861	The church, designed by George Shaw in Decorated style, is in stone with a slate roof. It consists of a nave on a plinth with corbelled eaves, a north aisle, a southwest porch, a short south transept acting as a vestry, a chancel, and a west steeple. The steeple has a tower with three stages, a circular stair turret, diagonal buttresses, and a broach spire. On the transept is a bellcote.	II
Norwich Street Mills; 53.60727°N 2.14935°W		c. 1860	A cotton spinning and weaving mill, later used for other purposes, it is in brick with stone dressings and slate roofs. The main block is in Italianate style, and has three and four storeys, and sides of 22 and seven bays. On the north side is a stair and water tower with a pyramidal roof. On the south side are the engine house, the single-storey boiler house with an L-shaped plan, and a two-storey workshop block, and near to this is an octagonal chimney. To the north is a separate workshop, engine house and warehouse.	II
St Martin's Church; 53.58852°N 2.17570°W		1860–1862	The church is in stone with a slate roof. It consists of a nave with a clerestory, north and south aisles, north and south transepts, a chancel with north and south vestries, and a northwest steeple. The steeple has a tower with three stages, a doorway, angle buttresses, quatrefoil banding, and a broach spire that has canopies with statues and gabled lucarnes.	II
All Saints Church; 53.62733°N 2.14702°W		1863–1866	The church, designed by J. Medland Taylor, is in stone with a slate roof. It consists of a nave with a clerestory, north and south aisles, a northwest porch, a double south transept with unequal gables, a chancel, and a southwest steeple. The steeple has a four-stage tower, set back buttresses, one incorporating a staircase, a south porch, and a broach spire. The east window has five lights.	II
Cemetery Hotel public house 53.61338°N 2.18175°W		1860s (possible)	A public house with a 20th-century decorative scheme, it is in brick with a sill band, a dentilled eaves band, and a hipped slate roof. The pub is on a corner site, with an acutely angled corner, and has two storeys at the front and three at the rear. There is a central doorway with a fanlight, and the windows have segmental heads, those on the ground floor containing stained glass with Art Nouveau motifs and etched glass, and on the upper floor are casement windows.	II
St Mary's Church; 53.60098°N 2.14632°W		1865–1872	The church is in stone with a slate roof that has patterned slates and cross finials, and it is in Decorated style. It consists of a nave with a clerestory, north and south aisles, north and south transepts, a chancel, and a northwest steeple. The steeple has a tower has four stages, diagonal buttresses, an octagonal bell turret, the eaves have ballflower decoration, angels and gargoyles, and on the top is a broach spire with lucarnes and canopy pinnacles. In the transepts are rose windows.	II
Pillar box surmounted by gas lamp 53.61862°N 2.15925°W		1866	The structure has been relocated to stand outside 31 Toad Lane, and both parts are in cast iron. The pillar box is cylindrical with an inscribed base and has a horizontal slit and a hexagonal cap. On top is a gas lamp that has a gadrooned-vase base, a fluted shaft, a foliated capital, and a hexagonal lantern with a finial.	II
St Mary's School; 53.60059°N 2.14621°W	—	1866	The school is in stone with a slate roof with a crested ridge. It has a central hall and cross-wings, the right being the larger. The porch has two semicircular-headed openings and a flat roof with a balustrade. On the roof are gabled dormers, and on the ridge is a bellcote.	II
United Reformed Church; 53.59085°N 2.18363°W		1866	The chapel is in stone and has a slate roof with a coped gable and a finial. There are two storeys, with a meeting hall and vestry on the upper floor, and an undercroft below. There are single-storey extensions, one at the north and the other at the east. The entrance front has three bays, containing four pilasters, the central ones rising to pinnacles. The central doorway has a semicircular head, flanking engaged columns with crocket capitals, a projecting modillion cornice, and a parapet. Above the doorway is a round-headed three-light window, and there are round-headed windows on each floor of the outer bays.	II
Town Hall; 53.61580°N 2.15899°W		1866–1871	The town hall was designed by W. H. Crossland, the clock tower was destroyed in 1883, and its replacement is by Alfred Waterhouse. It is in stone with a Westmorland slate roof, and has an E-shaped plan. The town hall has a symmetrical front of 14 bays and a bay on the left linking with a clock tower. The central block has seven bays and two storeys, and contains a central three-bay porte-cochère with a balcony on which stand four gilded heraldic beasts. At the top is an embattled parapet, and in the centre on the roof is a flèche. The central bock is flanked by octagonal stair turrets, and the outer bays have three storeys and triangular stepped gables. The tower has three stages and clock faces flanked by pinnacles, above which is an octagonal lantern with a spire.	I
St Peter's Church; 53.61127°N 2.14273°W	—	1869	The church, by J. Medland and Henry Taylor, is in polygonal yellow sandstone with red brick dressings and decoration, and roofs in blue and green slate. It consists of a nave with a clerestory, north and south aisles, and a semi-octagonal chancel with a north vestry and a south organ chamber. At the west end is a porch, a former baptistry, a stair turret, and a southwest porch intended as the base of a tower. The southwest porch has a pyramidal roof, diagonal buttresses, and an entrance with a pointed arch flanked by roundels containing carvings.	II
St Edmund's Church; 53.62101°N 2.16577°W		1870–1873	This is a redundant church designed by J. Medland Taylor in Gothic Revival style, containing much Masonic symbolism. It is in sandstone, on a plinth, it has slate roofs with coped gables and finials, and has a cruciform plan. The church consists of a nave with a west porch and a circular stair turret at the northwest, north and south transepts, the latter with a porch, a chancel with a vestry to the north and a chapel to the south, and a tower at the crossing. The tower has buttresses, an embattled parapet with corner crocketed pinnacles, and there is a higher octagonal stair turret with a small spire at the northeast. Around the diamond-shaped churchyard is a stone wall with stone piers and iron railings, and moulded gateposts.	I
17a and 19 Baillie Street; 53.61797°N 2.15644°W		Late 19th century	No. 17a originated as a woollen warehouse, and No. 19 as a showroom, and they have since been used for other purposes. Both parts have Welsh slate roofs. No. 17a is in brick with sandstone dressings, and has three storeys and a partial basement, three bays on the front and five on the side. The central doorway has a segmental-arched head, rusticated pilasters, a large keystone, and an entablature with a modillion cornice. Flanking the ground floor are pilasters with semicircular finials. The windows have segmental heads and keystones. In the centre of the left return is a full-height loading bay. The former showroom to the right has two storeys and a basement, and three bays, with a sandstone ground floor and a brick upper floor. In the left bay is a segmental-headed doorway, the central window on the upper floor has a round head, the others have segmental heads, and all have keystones. At the top is a parapet with a central triangular pediment.	II
County Court Building; 53.61629°N 2.15772°W		Late 19th century	The former court building on a corner site, later used for other purposes, is in ashlar stone, and has three storeys. There are five bays facing Packer Street, and three on Fleece Street. On the ground floor are Doric pilasters and a Doric entablature. The windows on the middle floor have dentil cornices and moulded architraves. On the top floor is a guilloché band, and the windows have moulded architraves, entablatures, and Greek key and dentil detailing.	II
Newbold Buildings; 53.61389°N 2.15204°W		1877	A shop on a corner site, it was built as the central premises of the Conservative Industrial Co-operative Society. It is in orange brick, with the ground floor encased in sandstone, dressings in sandstone, and a slate roof. There are three storeys and kite-shaped plan, with three bays on the sides, and a curved bay on the corner, each bay with a gable containing a decorative circular panel. On the ground floor are doors and windows divided by pilasters with moulded capitals over which is a frieze and a dentilled cornice. On the upper floor the sides contain paired segmental-headed windows with quoined surround and hood moulds, and at the top is a dentilled eaves cornice. The top floor of the curved bay contains an inscribed plaque and a circular clock face.	II
Statue of G. L. Ashworth; 53.61342°N 2.16012°W		1878	The statue in Broadfield Park commemorates Alderman G. L. Ashworth, a local politician. The statue is in stone and stands on a square marble plinth with a cornice and a moulded base, on a stylobate.	II
Central Library, Museum and Art Gallery; 53.61515°N 2.16190°W		1883	The library was built first, followed by the art gallery and museum linked to the library in 1903, and an extension in 1913. The building was converted into an art and heritage centre in 2003. It is in Yorkshire stone and has a slate roof. The library has one storey, a front of three gables with ball finials, a central porch with an arcaded parapet, an elliptical-headed doorway, and mullioned and transomed windows with elliptical heads and hood moulds. The museum and art gallery have two storeys, a four-bay central block, a three-bay gabled block to the right, and a diagonally-set gabled block to the left. On the gables are panels of carved figures.	II
10, 12, 14 and 16 Baillie Street; 53.61763°N 2.15741°W	—	1890	Originally two shops and a bank to the right, the bank has since been converted into a shop. The building is in brick and stone, with two storeys and an angled front. To the left are two shop fronts, with an entrance between them, and to the right a larger shop front and the former entrance to the bank. This is in stone and contains a doorway with a semicircular head, decorated pilasters and spandrels, and a fanlight. Above is triangular pediment containing a coat of arms on an elliptical pediment with decorated consoles. On the upper floor are windows with segmental or semicircular heads and keystones, and at the top is an eaves cornice.	II
Statue of John Bright; 53.61453°N 2.16226°W		1891	The statue in Broadwood Park commemorates John Bright, a local statesman. It is in stone, designed by Hamo Thornycroft, and consists of a figure standing on a tapering square pedestal with a cornice and moulded base, on a stylobate. On the pedestal are inscriptions and quotations.	II
Silver Street Chapel; 53.62165°N 2.17033°W		1893	The chapel was designed by Edgar Wood in Arts and Crafts style, and was extended in 1902 and later. It is in red brick with stone dressings, quoins and bands, and has a T-shaped plan. In the gabled entrance front, steps lead up to a round-headed doorway, above which is a panel and seven stepped lancet windows. The gable apex is rendered and decorated with a sculpted Tree of Life. Flanking the doorway are sloping buttresses. Along the south side is a single-storey extension, with a projecting gable at the east end and a two-storey cross-wing at the west.	II
Barcroft; 53.60198°N 2.19097°W	—	1894	A house by Edgar Wood, with elements of Vernacular architecture, in rendered brick with stone dressings and a tiled roof. It has two storeys, four bays, and a projecting single-storey rear wing to the left. The first bay contains a flat-headed archway leading to the rear, and above it is a mullioned oriel window. In the second bay are sloping projecting bricks and stepped windows reflecting the staircase, and the third bay contains a projecting gabled wing with an elliptical-headed doorway, a dated lintel, mullioned and transomed windows, and decorative bargeboards. In the right bay is a diagonally-set Tudor-style two-storey bay window.	II
Foldyard Buildings, Woodhouse Farm; 53.63034°N 2.21514°W	—	1895	A range of buildings with a U-shaped plan in stone with quoins, corbelled eaves, and a stone-slate roof with ridge tiles and ball finials on the corners. On the south side is a gabled porch with a semicircular fanlight, a vent hole, and a corniced pediment. The door openings have rounded jambs and lintels.	II
Foldyard Midden, Woodhouse Farm; 53.63044°N 2.21512°W	—	1895	A midden shelter with a rectangular plan and sides of one and two bays. It has a hipped stone-slate roof with clay ridge tiles, carried on slender cast iron columns with retaining side walls.	II
HSBC Bank; 53.61703°N 2.15815°W		1895	Built originally for the Oldham Joint Stock Bank, the bank is in sandstone on a plinth of pink granite with slate roofs, and is in Neoclassical style. It is on a corner site and has a curved front. The central section has three storeys and three bays, and is flanked by two-storey ranges, with three bays on the left and four on the right. Between the floors are frieze bands, and at the top are eaves entablatures and moulded dentilled cornices. The ground floor is rusticated and the windows are round-headed with rusticated voussoirs. The first floor windows are flat-headed with architraves and canopies on console brackets. In the central section is a round-headed doorway with voussoirs and a keystone carved with a shield. Above are four giant engaged Tuscan columns carrying an entablature and a balustraded parapet.	II
Spotland Methodist Church; 53.62509°N 2.17726°W		1896	The church is in brick on a stone plinth, with ashlar dressings and a slate roof. The entrance front has five bays and rusticated corner pilasters. The central three bays project slightly under a pediment carried on Corinthian columns. There is a central round-headed doorway flanked by Corinthian columns with a fanlight and an open segmental pediment containing a cartouche. In the outer bays are tall pedimented windows. Along the sides are windows with semicircular heads and keystones, and at the rear is a large vestry block.	II
Gateway, Falinge Park; 53.62164°N 2.16338°W		c. 1900	At the entrance to the park are two pairs of stone piers flanking the vehicle entrance and two pedestrian entrances, and a pair at the ends of the curving walls. They are in sandstone and have projecting bases, recessed panels, floral festoons, and modillion cornices, and are surmounted by garlanded finials. The gates are in cast iron and have scrollwork and heraldic cartouches.	II
Two bridges spanning the River Spodden; 53.61799°N 2.17298°W; 53.61721°N 2.17155°W	—	1904–05	The two bridges carry Mellor Street over a curve in the River Spodden, and each consists of a single shallow skew arch. The abutments, the slab arches, and the buttresses are in reinforced concrete, and the parapets are in sandstone. The parapets are on chamfered plinths, and have rectangular chamfered openings and chamfered coping. At the ends are panelled rectangular piers with chamfered caps.	II
The Vicarage; 53.61900°N 2.15911°W		1906	The vicarage, later used as offices, is in red brick with stone dressings, and has a stone-slate roof with coped gables and ball finials. It is in Jacobean style, with a roughly T-shaped plan, and two storeys with attics and a basement. The windows are mullioned, one also with transoms, and contain horizontally sliding sash windows. The doorway has a moulded lintel and a moulded flat hood. At the rear is a canted stone bay window.	II
Former Union Bank of Manchester; 53.61666°N 2.15754°W	—	1906–07	The former bank, later used for other purposes, is in stone with a rusticated granite plinth and a slate roof. It has three storeys with an attic, and a front of three bays. The central bay rises to a tower with a dentilled cornice, an octagonal stone lantern and a lead cupola, which is flanked by four seated female figures. On the ground floor is a round-arched doorway with a moulded hood mould, a giant keystone, and a fanlight. Above are giant pilasters carrying segmental pediments. On the middle floor are casement windows with balconies, and above the central window is a pediment, and a relief carving of allegorical figures.	II
Institute for the Deaf; 53.61598°N 2.15617°W		1907	The building is in pale Manchester brick, with dressings in red Huncoat brick and red St Bees sandstone, and a slate roof. It has two storeys, a cellar, an L-shaped plan, and a six bay front. The fourth bay is gabled and contains a doorway that has jambs of red brick quoining, a hood on console brackets, and a fanlight. Under the window above this is a terracotta plaque, and above it is a diamond-shaped terracotta datestone. Most of the windows are sashes, and all have brick apron panels beneath and gauged brick lintels above.	II
15 Broadhalgh Avenue; 53.61509°N 2.19400°W	—	1907–1909	The house, designed by Parker and Unwin, is roughcast on a plinth, with corner buttresses, ashlar dressings, and steeply pitched slate roofs containing dormer windows. It consists of three linked blocks, each with one storey and an attic, and with a covered walkway composed of timber posts supporting the eaves. The left block has six bays and mullioned windows, the right bay has two bays with a garage in front of it, and the main block which is recessed, with two square bay windows at the rear, and a nine-light dormer window. At the front of the house is a pergola and double-gates with massive piers and a hipped roof.	II
Arrow (Vale) Mill; 53.59497°N 2.17327°W		1908	A cotton mill by Philip Sidney Stott in brick with slate roofs and an internal structure in steel and concrete. It has a main block of five storeys, sides of 44 and five bays, a water tower at the northeast corner with a hipped roof and a wrought iron balustrade, and smaller corner towers. There are also an engine house, a two-storey workshop, a two-storey office block, other workshops, a boiler house, and a cylindrical chimney with a moulded crown.	II
Church of St Mary in the Baum; 53.61897°N 2.15862°W		1909–1911	The church was rebuilt in 1909–1911 by Ninian Comper re-using material from the original church of 1742. It is in brick with sandstone dressings, a tiled roof and has two storeys. The church consists of a tall nave with a clerestory to the north, two aisles to the a north, the outer aisle having the characteristics of the original church, a north porch, and a chancel. On the west gable of the nave is a bellcote re-used from the previous church.	I
St Anne's Church; 53.61655°N 2.12833°W		1912–13	The church, by R. B. Preston, is in stone with a slate roof. It consists of a nave with a clerestory, a west baptistry, north and south aisles, a chancel with a south vestry and a north organ chamber, and a southwest tower. The tower has diagonal buttresses and a stepped parapet, and the aisle windows have ogee head.	II
St Aidan's Church; 53.60124°N 2.17793°W		1913–1915	The church was designed by Temple Moore in Early English style, and the tower was completed in 1931. It is in stone with roofs partly of clay tile and partly of slate. The church consists of a nave and a north aisle under one roof, a south aisle roofed separately, a higher chancel with a clerestory and flanked by chapels, a west porch, and a west tower. The tower has a stair turret, a west door, and an embattled parapet.	II*
Norden War Memorial; 53.62650°N 2.20718°W		1920	The war memorial is in a triangular memorial garden at a road junction, and is in Yorkstone. It stands on a plinth and an octagonal pedestal, and has an octagonal shaft and a Latin cross. Between the shaft and the cross-arms are projecting crockets, and on the front of the cross is a carved laurel wreath and a sword. The pedestal carries an inscription, and there are panels with the names of those lost in the two World Wars. The garden is enclosed by low iron railings and the area is paved with Yorkstone.	II
Post Office; 53.61657°N 2.15896°W		1920	The Post Office, designed by C. P. Wilkinson in Baroque style, is in Portland stone with a Westmorland slate roof. It has two storeys with an attic, an L-shaped plan, and a main front of nine bays, the seven middle bays projecting forward. The ground floor is rusticated on a plinth, and contains round-headed openings with scroll keystones. On the upper floor are sash windows with architraves and cornices, and in the roof are pedimented dormers. The building has rusticated quoins, and a moulded cornice with lion's heads.	II
Rochdale Cenotaph; 53.61630°N 2.15975°W		1922	The cenotaph was designed by Sir Edwin Lutyens. It stands in a garden in front of the Town Hall, and is in Cornish granite. The cenotaph is about 10 metres (33 ft) tall and consists of a rectangular pier flanked by half-columns. On top of the pier is a catafalque on which are carved wreathes and a coat of arms, and it is surmounted by the recumbent figure of a soldier. Around the cenotaph are four carved and painted flags, and on it are inscriptions. To the southeast is a Stone of Remembrance.	I
Lamp posts, War memorial 53.61612°N 2.15973°W	—	c. 1922	The lamp posts are at the corners of the war memorial. They are in cast iron on granite plinths. Each lamp post consists of a latticework pylon with crossed torches, and it carries spherical lamp shades.	II
St John the Baptist Church; 53.61132°N 2.15495°W		1925–1927	A Roman Catholic church in Byzantine Revival style. It is faced in brick with artificial stone dressings, and has a ferro-concrete dome. The church has a cruciform plan, with a central dome, a narthex, transepts, an apsidal sanctuary and a sacristy. The dome is 95 feet (29 m) tall and has a diameter of 65 feet (20 m). Around it is a clerestory of 35 round-headed windows, and is surmounted by a cupola with a crucifix finial.	II*
Buersil and Balderstone War Memorial; 53.59971°N 2.14595°W		1928	The war memorial stands at a road junction, and is in granite. It consists of a Latin cross on a tapering shaft, a tapering rectangular plinth, a rectangular base, and a low step. In the centre of the cross is a carved rose in low relief. There are inscriptions on the base of the shaft and on the plinth, and the names of those lost in the World Wars. Behind the memorial is a curved wall containing a drinking fountain.	II
Wall northwest of St Chad's Church; 53.61477°N 2.15818°W	—	Undated	The wall was discovered partly buried in 1903 in the churchyard of St Chad's Church, and has been dated possibly to the Anglo-Saxon era. It consists of 23 posts grooved to accommodate stone flags. The wall is about 1 metre (3 ft 3 in) tall and 24 metres (79 ft) long.	II

== Notes and references ==
=== Sources ===
- Historic England, "Church of St Chad, Rochdale (1045812)", National Heritage List for England
- Historic England, "Rochdale Bridge, at the junction of The Esplanade, Yorkshire Street, The Butts, South Parade, Rochdale (1461917)", National Heritage List for England
- Historic England, "Hill House, Rochdale (1084269)", National Heritage List for England
- Historic England, "Smallshaw Farmhouse, Rochdale (1084252)", National Heritage List for England
- Historic England, "Sundial in Ashworth Hall quadrangle, Rochdale (1084284)", National Heritage List for England
- Historic England, "Oakenrod Hall, Rochdale (1084244)", National Heritage List for England
- Historic England, "Nos. 246, 248 and 250 Edenfield Road, Rochdale (1367077)", National Heritage List for England
- Historic England, "Nos. 32, 34 and 36 Falinge Fold, Rochdale (1055873)", National Heritage List for England
- Historic England, "Nos. 22 and 24 Lower Tenterfield, Rochdale (1057667)", National Heritage List for England
- Historic England, "Ashworth Hall, Rochdale (1084283)", National Heritage List for England
- Historic England, "Sand Hole farmhouse, Rochdale (1396460)", National Heritage List for England
- Historic England, "Schofield Farm The Three Owls Bird Sanctuary, Rochdale (1084261)", National Heritage List for England
- Historic England, "Ellenrod Farmhouse, Rochdale (1346245)", National Heritage List for England
- Historic England, "Manor Farmhouse, Rochdale (1084223)", National Heritage List for England
- Historic England, "Wolstenholme Fold Farmhouse and barn, Rochdale (1346255)", National Heritage List for England
- Historic England, "Nos. 6, 8 and 10 Harridge Street, Rochdale (1055734)", National Heritage List for England
- Historic England, "Stocks to south of Church of Saint Chad, Rochdale (1346246)", National Heritage List for England
- Historic England, "Fern Hill First Farmhouse, Rochdale (1084277)", National Heritage List for England
- Historic England, "Fisherfield Farmhouse, Rochdale (1031335)", National Heritage List for England
- Historic England, "Bank House Farmhouse, Rochdale (1084262)", National Heritage List for England
- Historic England, "Lloyds Bank, Rochdale (1203380)", National Heritage List for England
- Historic England, "Woodhouse, East Cottage and attached cottages, Rochdale (1084224)", National Heritage List for England
- Historic England, "Duffins Cottage, Rochdale (1084250)", National Heritage List for England
- Historic England, "Old Falinge, Rochdale (1346250)", National Heritage List for England
- Historic England, "Crossfield Farm and Cottage, Rochdale (1084279)", National Heritage List for England
- Historic England, "Rochdale Museum, The Old Vicarage, Rochdale (1025899)", National Heritage List for England
- Historic England, "Fern Hill Cottage, Rochdale (1366612)", National Heritage List for England
- Historic England, "Egerton Arms, Rochdale (1187085)", National Heritage List for England
- Historic England, "Yates's Wine Lodge, Rochdale (1084228)", National Heritage List for England
- Historic England, "Ashworth Hall Estate Cottages and adjoining barn, Rochdale (1346231)", National Heritage List for England
- Historic England, "Ashworth Fold Farmhouse, Rochdale (1084285)", National Heritage List for England
- Historic England, "Large barn to north of Ashworth Fold Farmhouse, Rochdale (1346232)", National Heritage List for England
- Historic England, "Market cross, Rochdale (1031929)", National Heritage List for England
- Historic England, "Healey Hall, Rochdale (1031799)", National Heritage List for England
- Historic England, "No. 128 Yorkshire Street, Rochdale (1084226)", National Heritage List for England
- Historic England, "Falinge Park Hall facade and pavilions, Rochdale (1055837)", National Heritage List for England
- Historic England, "Mount Cottage, Rochdale (1084251)", National Heritage List for England
- Historic England, "The Reed Hotel, Rochdale (1038323)", National Heritage List for England
- Historic England, "Sundial to south of Church of Saint Chad, Rochdale (1084270)", National Heritage List for England
- Historic England, "Nos. 33 and 35 Broad Lane and attached flagstone boundary wall to east, Rochdale (1346243)", National Heritage List for England
- Historic England, "Church of Saint James, Rochdale (1084288)", National Heritage List for England
- Historic England, "Nos. 61–73 Broad Lane, Rochdale (1084266)", National Heritage List for England
- Historic England, "Standrings House, Rochdale (1346241)", National Heritage List for England
- Historic England, "Nos. 170, 172 and 174 Yorkshire Street, Rochdale (1346257)", National Heritage List for England
- Historic England, "Rochdale Canal Coppy Bridge, Rochdale (1346236)", National Heritage List for England
- Historic England, "Rochdale Canal Lock No. 49 (Moss Upper Lock)(East of Oldham Road), Rochdale (1038316)", National Heritage List for England
- Historic England, "Rochdale Canal Lock No. 50 (Moss Lower Lock), Rochdale (1084248)", National Heritage List for England
- Historic England, "Rochdale Canal Lock No. 52 and towpath bridge, Rochdale (1038295)", National Heritage List for England
- Historic England, "Rochdale Canal Lock No. 53, Rochdale (1346237)", National Heritage List for England
- Historic England, "Owd Betts Public House, Rochdale (1084290)", National Heritage List for England
- Historic England, "No. 31 Broad Lane, Rochdale (1084265)", National Heritage List for England
- Historic England, "Nos. 75 and 77 Broad Lane, Rochdale (1346244)", National Heritage List for England
- Historic England, "Nos. 190, 191 and 192 Dewhirst Road, Rochdale (1346247)", National Heritage List for England
- Historic England, "Nos. 532 and 534 Edenfield Road, Rochdale (1346248)", National Heritage List for England
- Historic England, "Nos. 303, 305 and 305a Milnrow Road, Rochdale (1346264)", National Heritage List for England
- Historic England, "Nos. 144, 145, 146, 147 and 148 Syke Road, Rochdale (1354749)", National Heritage List for England
- Historic England, "Nos. 149 and 150 Syke Road, Rochdale (1084253)", National Heritage List for England
- Historic England, "Nos. 188A, 190, 190A, 192, and 194 Yorkshire Street, Rochdale (1084227)", National Heritage List for England
- Historic England, "No. 31 Toad Lane, Rochdale (1084256)", National Heritage List for England
- Historic England, "The former Royds Bank, Rochdale (1045852)", National Heritage List for England
- Historic England, "Bamford United Reformed Church, Rochdale (1084292)", National Heritage List for England
- Historic England, "Nos. 107 and 109 Halifax Road, Rochdale (1084280)", National Heritage List for England
- Historic England, "No. 36 Meanwood Brow, Rochdale (1084242)", National Heritage List for England
- Historic England, "Nos. 394, 396, 398 and 400 Shawclough Road, Rochdale (1031788)", National Heritage List for England
- Historic England, "Nos. 151 and 152 Syke Road, Rochdale (1084254)", National Heritage List for England
- Historic England, "Nos. 153 and 154 Syke Road, Rochdale (1354753)", National Heritage List for England
- Historic England, "Dukes Restaurant and Nightclub, Rochdale (1367054)", National Heritage List for England
- Historic England, "Hope Chapel and Parsons House, Rochdale (1057694)", National Heritage List for England
- Historic England, "Nos. 32 and 34 Meanwood Brow, Rochdale (1346263)", National Heritage List for England
- Historic England, "Castle Hill House, Rochdale (1045858)", National Heritage List for England
- Historic England, "Ukrainian Catholic Church of Saint Mary, Rochdale (1346258)", National Heritage List for England
- Historic England, "Thrum Hall, Rochdale (1084255)", National Heritage List for England
- Historic England, "No. 24 Baron Street, Rochdale (1470833)", National Heritage List for England
- Historic England, "No. 132 Drake Street, Rochdale (1084271)", National Heritage List for England
- Historic England, "No. 101 Syke Road, Rochdale (1459483)", National Heritage List for England
- Historic England, "No. 102 Syke Road, Rochdale (1346239)", National Heritage List for England
- Historic England, "No. 17 Milnrow Road, Rochdale (1470832)", National Heritage List for England
- Historic England, "Nos. 1 and 3 Whitehall Street and No. 20 East Gate Street, Rochdale (1084259)", National Heritage List for England
- Historic England, "Sundial in Bamford Chapel graveyard, Rochdale (1084293)", National Heritage List for England
- Historic England, "Prickshaw Cottages, Rochdale (1346267)", National Heritage List for England
- Historic England, "Town Head House Dept. of Social Services, Town Head Offices, Rochdale (1084282)", National Heritage List for England
- Historic England, "Waterside House, Rochdale (1470233)", National Heritage List for England
- Historic England, "Congregational Church, Rochdale (1346265)", National Heritage List for England
- Historic England, "Rochdale Branch Canal Arm Halfpenny Bridge, Rochdale (1031919)", National Heritage List for England
- Historic England, "Church of Saint Clement, Rochdale (1203251)", National Heritage List for England
- Historic England, "Spotland Bridge New Mill, Rochdale (1268046)", National Heritage List for England
- Historic England, "Flagstone wall on east side of footpath from Turnhill Road/Crompton Avenue, Rochdale (1253201)", National Heritage List for England
- Historic England, "Flagstone boundary wall to the west of No. 42 Broad Lane, Rochdale (1084240)", National Heritage List for England
- Historic England, "No. 5 Baillie Street, Rochdale (1242950)", National Heritage List for England
- Historic England, "Vicarage of Church of Saint Clement, Rochdale (1084260)", National Heritage List for England
- Historic England, "Church of Christ, Rochdale (1055744)", National Heritage List for England
- Historic England, "Heybrook Mill, Rochdale (1268009)", National Heritage List for England
- Historic England, "Old Toll House, Rochdale (1084272)", National Heritage List for England
- Historic England, "Pig sties 5 metres north of Ashworth Fold Farmhouse, Rochdale (1084286)", National Heritage List for England
- Historic England, "Pig sties approximately 20 metres southeast of Ashworth Fold Farmhouse, Rochdale (1346230)", National Heritage List for England
- Historic England, "Vicarage of Church of Christ, Rochdale (1055756)", National Heritage List for England
- Historic England, "Rochdale Cemetery Gateway (1084268)", National Heritage List for England
- Historic England, "Church of Saint Paul, Rochdale (1054802)", National Heritage List for England
- Historic England, "Norwich Street Mills, Rochdale (1268012)", National Heritage List for England
- Historic England, "Church of Saint Martin, Rochdale (1203230)", National Heritage List for England
- Historic England, "Church of All Saints, Rochdale (1084278)", National Heritage List for England
- Historic England, "Cemetery Hotel Public House, Rochdale (1393976)", National Heritage List for England
- Historic England, "Church of Saint Mary, Rochdale (1346266)", National Heritage List for England
- Historic England, "Saint Mary's Church of England School, Rochdale (1084245)", National Heritage List for England
- Historic England, "Pillar Box surmounted by Gas Lamp adjacent to No. 31 Toad Lane, Rochdale (1253187)", National Heritage List for England
- Historic England, "United Reformed Church, Rochdale (1084281)", National Heritage List for England
- Historic England, "Town Hall, Rochdale (1084275)", National Heritage List for England
- Historic England, "Church of St Peter, Rochdale (1346238)", National Heritage List for England
- Historic England, "Church of Saint Edmund and associated boundary wall, railings and gates, Rochdale (1084273)", National Heritage List for England
- Historic England, "Nos. 17A and 19 Baillie Street, Rochdale (1084263)", National Heritage List for England
- Historic England, "County Court Building, Rochdale (1038535)", National Heritage List for England
- Historic England, "Newbold Buildings, 33-37 Oldham Road, Rochdale (1470830)", National Heritage List for England
- Historic England, "Statue of A. Ashworth, Rochdale (1084267)", National Heritage List for England
- Historic England, "Nos. 17A and 19 Baillie Street, Rochdale (1084263)", National Heritage List for England
- Historic England, "Rochdale Central Library, Museum and Art Gallery (1367096)", National Heritage List for England
- Historic England, "Nos. 10, 12, 14 and 16 Baillie Street, Rochdale (1346242)", National Heritage List for England
- Historic England, "Statue of John Bright, Rochdale (1370017)", National Heritage List for England
- Historic England, "Silver Street Chapel, Rochdale (1390684)", National Heritage List for England
- Historic England, "Barcroft, Rochdale (1084264)", National Heritage List for England
- Historic England, "Woodhouse Farm Foldyard Buildings, Rochdale (1346256)", National Heritage List for England
- Historic England, "Woodhouse Farm Foldyard Midden, Rochdale (1084225)", National Heritage List for England
- Historic England, "The Former Oldham Joint Stock Bank, now HSBC, Rochdale (1416154)", National Heritage List for England
- Historic England, "Spotland Methodist Church, Rochdale (1084249)", National Heritage List for England
- Historic England, "Gateway to Falinge Park on corner of Falinge Road and Sheriff Street, Rochdale (1084276)", National Heritage List for England
- Historic England, "Two bridges spanning the River Spodden, Rochdale (1412243)", National Heritage List for England
- Historic England, "The Vicarage, Rochdale (1084257)", National Heritage List for England
- Historic England, "Former Union Bank of Manchester, 5 South Parade, Rochdale (1405181)", National Heritage List for England
- Historic England, "Institute for the Deaf, 23 Church Lane, Rochdale (1416153)", National Heritage List for England
- Historic England, "No. 15 Broadhalgh Avenue, Rochdale (1346262)", National Heritage List for England
- Historic England, "Arrow (Vale) Mill, Rochdale (1268015)", National Heritage List for England
- Historic England, "Church of St Mary-in-the-Baum, Rochdale (1025294)", National Heritage List for England
- Historic England, "Church of St Anne, Rochdale (1084243)", National Heritage List for England
- Historic England, "Church of St Aidan, Rochdale (1084241)", National Heritage List for England
- Historic England, "Norden War Memorial, Rochdale (1441459)", National Heritage List for England
- Historic England, "Post Office, Rochdale (1346249)", National Heritage List for England
- Historic England, "Rochdale Cenotaph (1084274)", National Heritage List for England
- Historic England, "Lamp-posts at each corner of War Memorial, Rochdale (1367099)", National Heritage List for England
- Historic England, "Roman Catholic Church of St John the Baptist, Rochdale (1376506)", National Heritage List for England
- Historic England, "Buersil and Balderstone War Memorial, Rochdale (1429198)", National Heritage List for England
- Historic England, "Wall to north-west of Church of Saint Chad, Rochdale (1054859)", National Heritage List for England
- Historic England, Listed Buildings
- Hartwell, Clare; Hyde, Matthew; Pevsner, Nikolaus (2004), Lancashire: Manchester and the South-East, The Buildings of England, New Haven and London: Yale University Press, ISBN 0-300-10583-5
