= St Aidan's Academy =

St Aidan's Academy may refer to:

- St Aidan's Catholic Academy, a Roman Catholic secondary school in Sunderland, Tyne and Wear, England
- St Aidan's Church of England Academy, a Church of England secondary school in Darlington, County Durham, England

== See also ==
- St Aidan's College (disambiguation)
- St. Aidan's School (disambiguation)
