= St Aidan's College =

St Aidan's College may refer to:

- St Aidan's College, Birkenhead, a former Church of England theological college
- St Aidan's College, Durham, England, part of the University of Durham
- St Aidan's Theological College, Ballarat, a former Anglican college in Australia

== See also ==
- St Aidan's Academy (disambiguation)
- St. Aidan's School (disambiguation)
