= Church of St Aidan, Rochdale =

Listed church in Greater Manchester, England

- St Aidan's Church, Rochdale
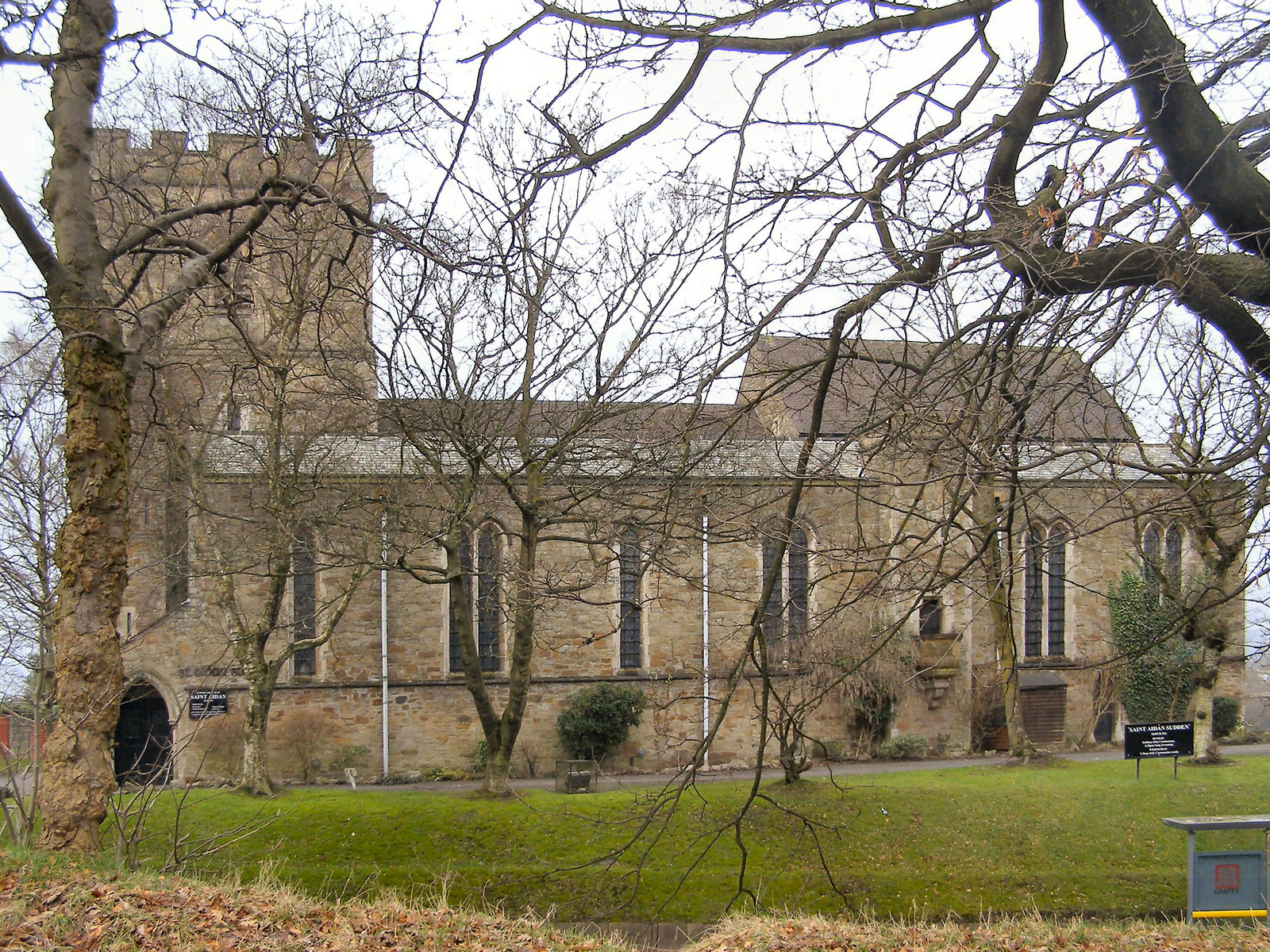
- The church in 2010

- Location in Greater Manchester
- 53.6012°N 2.1779°W
- OS grid reference: SD 88325 11642
- Address: Manchester Road, Rochdale, Greater Manchester
- Country: England
- Denomination: Anglican
- Website: staidan.org.uk

History
- Dedication: St Aidan
- Consecrated: 24 March 1915; 111 years ago

Architecture
- Heritage designation: Grade II*
- Designated: 12 February 1985
- Architect: Temple Moore
- Architectural type: Church
- Style: Early English
- Years built: 1913–1915; 111 years ago 1931; 95 years ago (tower)

Administration
- Archdiocese: Archdeaconry of Rochdale
- Diocese: Diocese of Manchester

Clergy
- Priest: Revd. Sydwell Isaac

The Church of St Aidan is an Anglican parish church on Manchester Road in Sudden, a district on the southern outskirts of Rochdale, Greater Manchester, England. Built between 1913 and 1915, it serves the parish of St Aidan Sudden and All Souls' Heywood within the Diocese of Manchester. It is recorded in the National Heritage List for England as a Grade II* listed building and noted for being one of the later works of the architect Temple Moore.

== History ==
The origins of Anglican worship in Sudden date to 1876, when members of St Alban's Church established a Sunday school in an empty shop on what is now Roch Valley Way. A more permanent base followed in 1883 with the construction of St Alban's Mission Room on Howarth Street, which served as a Sunday school and meeting place for the growing community until its demolition in the early 1970s during motorway construction.

A further presence was created in 1897, when a mission church dedicated to St Aidan was built off Bolton Road, Marland. Designed by the architect Edgar Wood, it was erected as a mission church to All Souls' Church, Captain Fold, Heywood. In 1908 the building was transferred to the parish and continued in use as a Sunday school until the 1940s; it was subsequently demolished in 1960.

Moves toward establishing a separate parish began in 1906, involving the vicars of St Alban's, Rochdale; All Souls', Heywood; and St Martin's, Castleton. The present church was commissioned soon afterwards, replacing the earlier mission facilities. The architect Temple Moore was appointed in 1909, and his Early English design was executed between 1913 and 1915. The church was consecrated by Edmund Knox, the bishop of Manchester, on 24 March 1915.

In 1931 the church was further developed with the addition of a small south tower. Although Moore had died a decade earlier, the tower followed the intentions set out in his plans and was carried out under the direction of his successors.

On 12 February 1985, the Church of St Aidan was designated a Grade II* listed building.

== Architecture ==
The church is constructed of random rubble with roofs of clay tile and slate. The nave and north aisle are carried beneath a single roof, while the south aisle has a separate, double-pitched roof. A central west tower rises above a higher chancel, which has chapels to the north and south, together with a triforium and clerestory.

On the south elevation, the four‑bay aisle is defined by rough quoins, a continuous sill moulding, a coped eaves parapet, and lancet windows alternating between one and two lights. To the west is a lean to porch with a pointed arch. The otherwise continuous two‑bay chapel is divided by a square stair turret, which incorporates an external semi‑octagonal stone pulpit on a bracket designed by Moore, together with small stair lights. A priest's door gives access to the chapel.

The tower includes a stair turret formed as a heavy buttress, a west doorway with three lancet windows above, and two‑light windows with plate tracery and hood moulds at the bell stage, all surmounted by bold castellations. The roof of the north aisle descends to meet adjoining 20th‑century school buildings. The chancel clerestory contains paired lancets, and the east window comprises three lancets beneath a semi‑circular hood mould that continues over two small flanking lancets. The gable is supported by weathered buttresses.

=== Interior ===
Internally, the nave arches are carried on substantial square piers, with those supporting the tower constructed on an especially massive scale. Within the chancel, the triforium displays pointed arches on the north side and round arches on the south. The reredos was also designed by Moore.

The east window, installed in 1945, serves as a war memorial to members of the parish who died in both the First and Second World Wars; their names being set into the pavement before the altar. The Father Willis organ, first installed in Park Hall in Cardiff and brought to the church in 1952, survives as a fully functioning instrument.

== See also ==
- Grade II* listed buildings in Greater Manchester
- Listed buildings in Rochdale
