= St. Aidan's School =

St. Aidan's School is the name of multiple schools:

- St Aidan's Anglican Girls' School, Corinda, Queensland, Australia, an independent girls' day school
- St Aidan's C.B.S. (Dublin), Dublin, Ireland, an Irish Christian Brothers secondary school
- St Aidan's Catholic Academy, Ashbrooke, Tyne and Wear, England, a Roman Catholic boys' secondary school and sixth form with academy status
- St Aidan's Church of England High School, Harrogate, Harrogate, North Yorkshire, England
- Saint Aidan's Church of England High School, Preesall, Preesall, Lancashire, England
- St Aidan's High School, Wishaw, North Lanarkshire, Scotland
- St. Aidan's Primary School, a primary school in Wishaw, Scotland

== See also ==
- St Aidan's Academy (disambiguation)
- St Aidan's College (disambiguation)
