= St John Fisher Catholic High School, Harrogate =

Voluntary aided school in Harrogate, North Yorkshire, England

St John Fisher Catholic High School
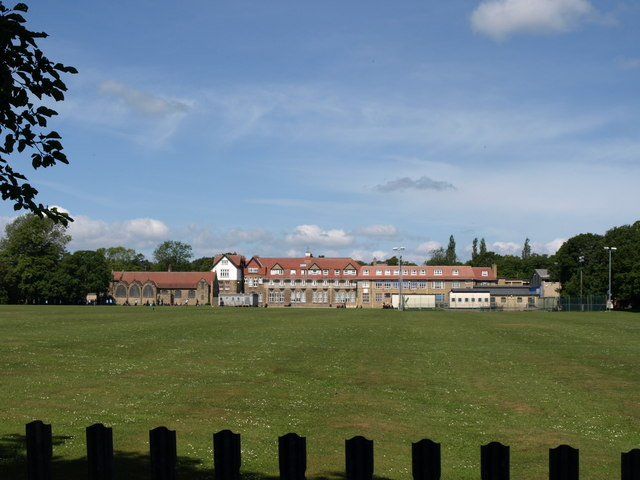

Location
- Hookstone Drive; Harrogate, North Yorkshire, HG2 8PT; England; 53.983886°N 1.518040°W

Information
- Type: Academy
- Motto: Educating for Life
- Religious affiliation: Roman Catholic
- Established: 1958
- Local authority: North Yorkshire
- Department for Education URN: 148855 Tables
- Ofsted: Reports
- Headteacher: Steve Mort
- Gender: Coeducational
- Age: 11 to 18
- Enrolment: 1,400
- Website: http://www.sjfchs.org.uk/

St John Fisher Catholic High School is a coeducational Roman Catholic secondary school and sixth form. It is located in Harrogate, North Yorkshire, England, and has developed steadily during the past 50 years and has around 1,400 pupils.

The school is set in 22 acres (8.9 ha) on the south side of Harrogate and skirted by Hookstone woods.

== History ==
The school buildings were first built in 1903 to hold a Catholic convent school under the Society of the Holy Child Jesus which moved from a building on Clarence Drive near Valley Gardens. The school was founded in 1958 on the site that is now the Area Education Office within the Harrogate High School campus. The school outgrew its facilities and moved to its current site on Hookstone Drive - using the buildings of the convent school although many nuns remained for some time to teach. The sisters of the Order of the Holy Child no longer teach at the school, but do maintain a convent over the road. Leo Gannon (Headmaster 1967-1988) oversaw the move of the school to Hookstone Drive and in 1973, along with fellow headmaster Ken Stott, created the St Aidan's and St John Fisher Associated Sixth Form.

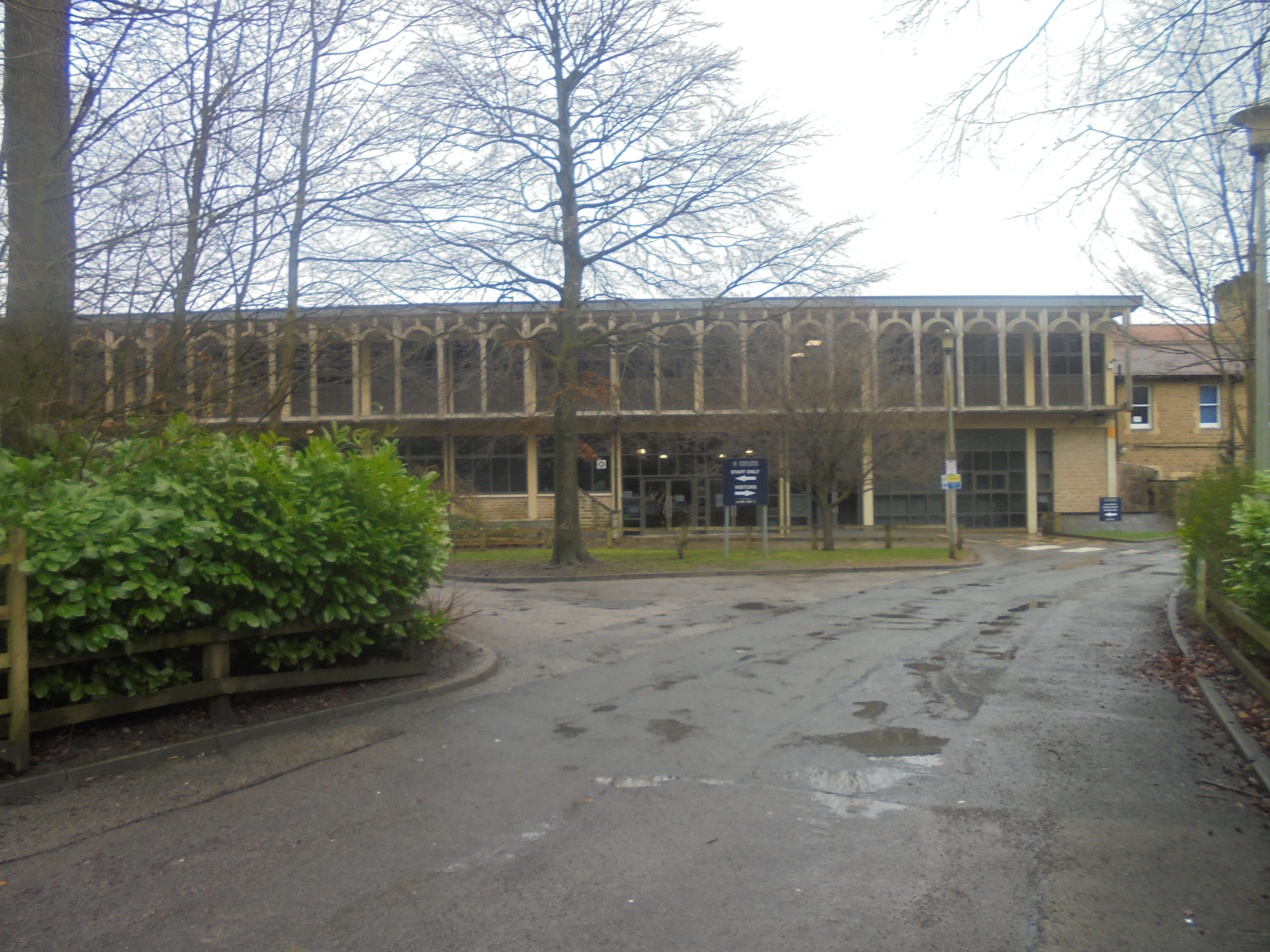
1978 buildings

Part of the site is made up of the original stone buildings of the convent. The science and technology building (along with the current school hall) was built in 1978 and is of a concrete construction. A sports hall of breeze block construction has since been opened to the rear of the buildings. Because much of the site was not purpose built as a school, many of the main buildings are unsuitable for modern educational use. This has led to a number of portable buildings and prefabricated cabins being built on the grounds. The school has large playing fields to the rear of the site which back onto Hookstone Woods. The school was ranked 20th in the country for public school GCSE results in 2014.

In 2001 the school gained Specialist Arts Status, the first school of its type to gain this status in North Yorkshire. The school then opened the 'Keelan Centre', named after the former headteacher, Terry Keelan, a new building linking the existing school and the school sports hall. This facility included a new dance and drama studio along with a new music block.

In September 2016, construction began on a new astro-turf pitch after the school received funding from the FA. This was completed in October 2017.

Previously a voluntary aided school administered by North Yorkshire County Council, in December 2021 St John Fisher Catholic High School converted to academy status. The school is now sponsored by The Bishop Wheeler Catholic Academy Trust. The school continues to be under the jurisdiction of the Roman Catholic Diocese of Leeds.

== Sixth form ==
The school forms part of an associated sixth form with St. Aidan's Church of England High School.

== Alumni ==
- Georgina Brayshaw, Team GB Olympic gold medalist
- Jacob Fincham-Dukes, English athlete
- Leah Galton, Manchester United footballer
- Andy Gray (footballer, born 1977)
- Archie Gray, English footballer
- Al Greenwood, journalist and drummer with Sports Team
- Will Hugill, football player for Burnley F.C.
- Ethan Hussey, British middle distance runner
- Jon McLaughlin (footballer)
- Andy O'Brien (footballer)

== See also ==
Other schools dedicated to John Fisher in Britain are located in Dewsbury, Peterborough, Purley and Wigan.
