= St Aidan's Church of England High School, Harrogate =

Academy in Harrogate, North Yorkshire, England

St Aidan's Church of England High School
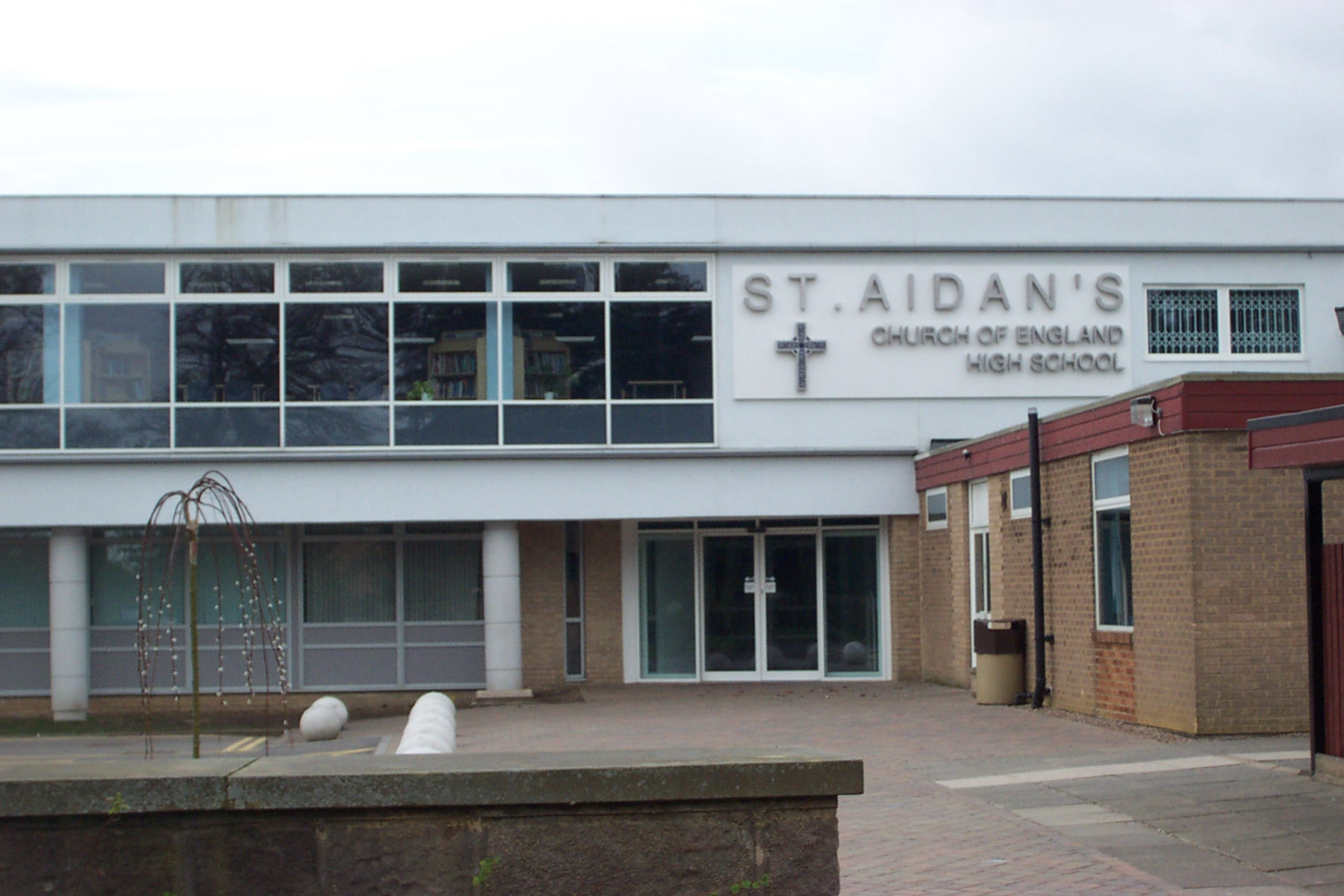

Location
- Oatlands Drive; Harrogate, North Yorkshire, HG2 8JR; England; 53.984800°N 1.522800°W

Information
- Type: Academy
- Religious affiliation: Church of England
- Established: 18 June 1966
- Department for Education URN: 137139 Tables
- Ofsted: Reports
- Chair of Governors: Joanne Wicks
- Head Teacher: Sian Dover
- Gender: Coeducational
- Age: 11 to 18
- Enrolment: 2,500
- Colours: Light Blue, Dark Blue & Yellow
- Website: http://www.staidans.co.uk/

St Aidan's Church of England High School is a mixed Church of England secondary school and sixth form with academy status, located in Harrogate, North Yorkshire, England. It currently houses over 2500 students of both lower school and sixth form age. It is named for the northern saint Aidan of Lindisfarne, the evangelist who brought the Christian gospel to Yorkshire in the 7th century.

It was ranked 476th in the country for its GCSE results in 2021 by The Times. Though assessed as 'Outstanding' for many years, Ofsted assessed St Aidan's to be 'Inadequate' in 2022 after a controversial inspection in September 2021. This marked a fall from the highest to the lowest Ofsted Grade. Another Ofsted inspection, carried out in May 2022, raised the evaluation of St Aidan's to 'Good'.

== History ==
The former Bishop of Ripon, John Moorman, laid the foundation stone of St Aidan's on 18 June 1966.

St Aidan's formed as a merger between the all-boys Christ Church Secondary School and the all-girls St Peter's Secondary School, and opened in September 1966 to provide Church of England education for Harrogate's fast-growing population. Since then, the number of pupils has grown.

In 1973, the Anglican St Aidan's formed an ecumenical sixth form in association with the nearby St John Fisher Catholic High School.

=== Building work ===
The school building has grown. The most notable addition to the site is perhaps the Constance Green Hall. It was built adjacent to the older Bede House, formerly Wheatlands Academy, a grade II listed building converted for the school's use and opened in 1997. A learning resources centre was opened in May 2006.

Other building work included a refurbishment of the Sixth Form Café area and the old chapel. The bottom tennis courts near the music block were also replaced with new classrooms and a chapel. The barn was replaced by new tennis courts. There were plans for Eton Fives courts and a Koi pond, but these were never realised. In September 2007, the lecture theatre was replaced by a Dance studio for pupils studying Dance.

In 2022, a large portion of the grass field was replaced by a new Astroturf pitch.

== Awards ==
The school was made one of the first Beacon Schools in 1998. It was also awarded Specialist College Science Status. It won the International Schools Award from the British Council in 2006. The school also received specialist Languages College Status, and followed this up with a series of Languages Days for both students of both primary and secondary level.

== Music ==
There are many ensembles run by staff and students with the senior ensembles competing in national competitions.

Founded in 1992 by former Director of Music at the school, Cathy Roberts, St Aidan's Chamber Choir is made up of members of the St Aidan's and St John Fisher Associated Sixth Form. It has appeared in the BBC Songs of Praise School Choirs Competition several times, winning in 2006. In 2022 the Choir celebrated its 30th anniversary with a concert in Ripon Cathedral.

The school is home to a Symphony Orchestra, Symphonic Wind Band and Swing Band among others. In 2009 the Symphonic Wind Band gained a Silver Award in the National Concert Band Championships held in Cardiff.

The anthem 'King of Kings' has become an unofficial school song.

== Sport ==
Jonathan Webb was a pupil at this school between 2001–2008 and an integral part of the football team's success in the North Yorkshire School Football circuit and at National level. He now plays for Loughborough University FC after a brief professional career at Leeds United and Newcastle Blue Star.

Caroline Lambert, a pupil between 2003 and 2010 is a regular member of England Great Britain fell running teams and World u23 mountain running trophy winner.

Chris Harrison (1998–2005) is a championship winning pool player, winning the Summer Supplementary Cup with Park View A in 2025.

Lucy Buxton (2004–2011) is an England junior basketball player.

George Mills (2010–present) is the current English Schools' 800m champion and England representative at the junior commonwealth games.

Tom Cartledge and Chris Noddings (1999–2006) qualified and played for the North Yorkshire Basketball team in the 06/07 season.

Chris Noddings (1999–2006) is also a multi-tournament winning tennis player, including winning both the HDTL Restricted Men's Singles and Mixed Doubles as well as finishing runner up in Men's Doubles in 2014

== Sixth form ==
The school forms part of an associated sixth form with St John Fisher Catholic High School.

== Notable faculty ==
Dennis Richards, headteacher 1988–2011, was awarded an OBE in 2007 for services to education. He also won the Ted Wragg Award for Lifetime Achievement at the 2007 Teaching Awards.

On 31 December 2011 it was announced that the former deputy head of St Aidan's, Steve Hatcher, had been awarded an MBE for services to education in the Queen's New Year's Honours list.

In January 2018, a third member of staff, Timothy Staden Pocock, was awarded an MBE for services to education, charity and local football.

== Notable alumni ==
- Maisie Adam (comedian), former Head Girl
- Jacob Dudman (actor)
- Malcolm Neesam (historian, who attended Christ Church Secondary School for Boys which was amalgamated with St Aidan's).
