= Ashworth, Greater Manchester =

Hamlet in Greater Manchester, England

Coordinates: 53.6155°N 2.2280°W

Ashworth
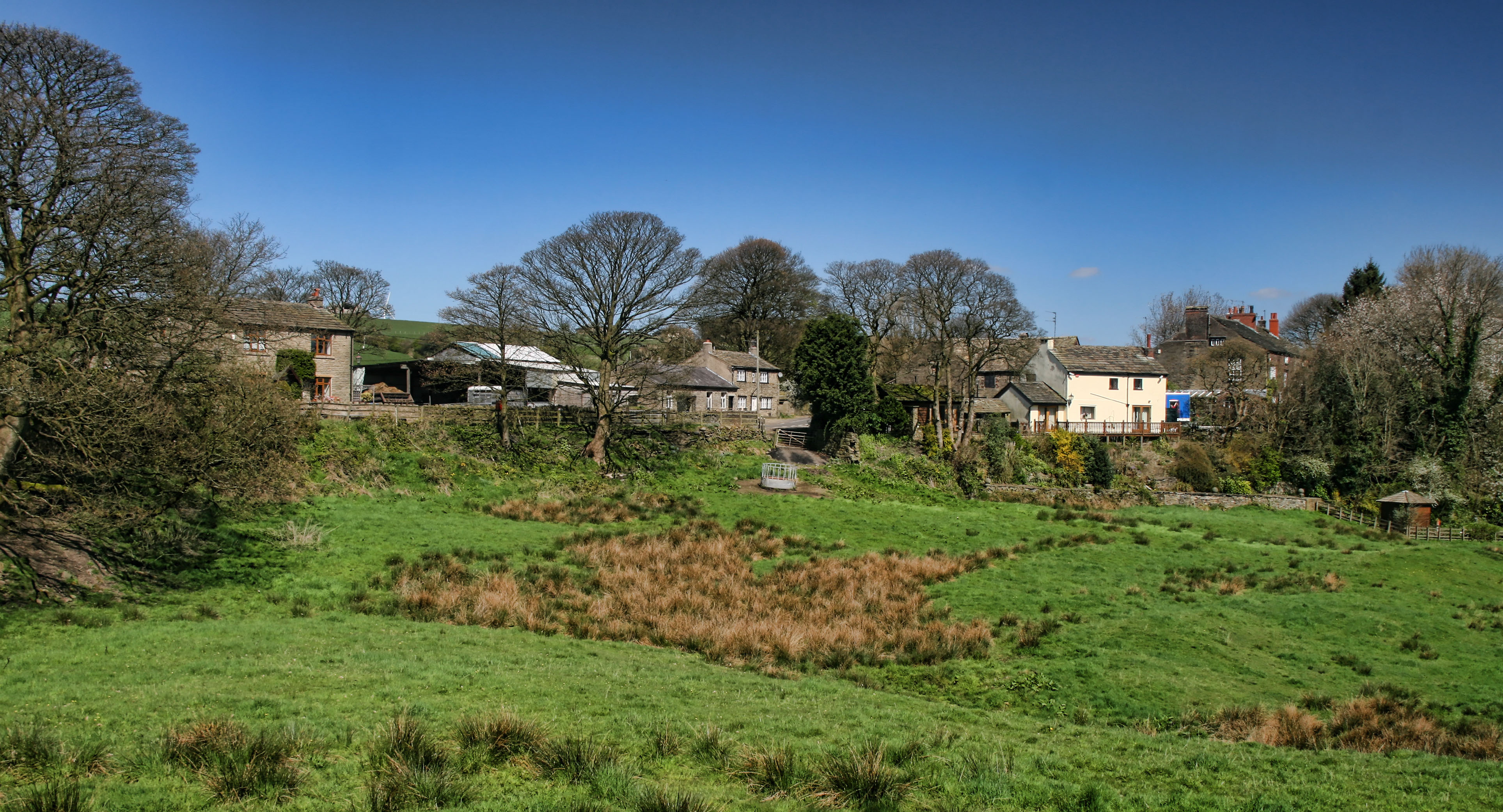
- Ashworth Hall

- Location within Greater Manchester
- Metropolitan borough: Rochdale
- Metropolitan county: Greater Manchester
- Region: North West
- Country: England
- Sovereign state: United Kingdom
- Post town: ROCHDALE
- Postcode district: OL11
- Police: Greater Manchester
- Fire: Greater Manchester
- Ambulance: North West
- UK Parliament: Heywood and Middleton

Ashworth is a hamlet within the Metropolitan Borough of Rochdale, in Greater Manchester, England. It lies in the Ashworth Valley, on the western edge of Rochdale, set amongst the Pennines. It is separated from Rochdale by the Naden Brook.

== History ==
The name "Ashworth" means 'Ash-tree enclosure'. Historically a part of Lancashire, Ashworth is first recorded in 1180-90 when it was a holding of the Lord of Middleton. In c1349, the Ashworth heiress Matilda married Hugh of Holt, and the Holt family held Ashworth until c1700. By 1767, it was in the ownership of the Egerton family.

Ashworth was formerly a township and chapelry in the parish of Middleton, in 1866 Ashworth became a separate civil parish, on 31 December 1894 the parish was abolished and merged with Birtle cum Bamford within the Municipal Borough of Heywood. In 1891 the parish had a population of 137. In 1974 it became part of Rochdale metropolitan district in the metropolitan county of Greater Manchester.

St James Chapel was founded in about 1514, with the present building dating from 1789.
