= Hunting lodge =

Hunting Lodge or Hunting lodge may refer to:

- Hunting lodge (U.K.), in Britain, a small country property used for organising hunting parties
- Jagdschloss ('hunting lodge'), in central Europe, a mansion or schloss built as the hunting residence for a king or nobleman and his entourage
- Pavillon de chasse ('hunting pavilion'), in France, a building dedicated to venery built in areas where hunts take place regularly
- Hunting cabin, a cottage used for hunting
- Hunting Lodge, Rouse Hill, heritage-listed property in New South Wales, Australia
- Hunting Lodge Farm, historic house in Ohio, United States

== See also ==
- Hunting Lodge Mass Grave
