= Lodge =

Lodge is originally a term for a relatively small building, often associated with a larger one.

Lodge or The Lodge may refer to:

== Buildings and structures ==
=== Types ===
- Lodge, a dwelling for a beaver, an aquatic mammal
- Lodge, a building for temporary or seasonal lodging, such as:
  - Hunting lodge (disambiguation), a building that is built to accommodate hunters
  - Mountain hut, a hostel for trekkers, very often called a lodge
  - Safari lodge, also called a game lodge, a type of tourist accommodation in southern and eastern Africa
  - Ski lodge, a building that is purpose-built to support the sport of snow skiing
- Gatekeeper's lodge, a structure at the entrance to a country estate
- Lodges, the houses used by the Chi Psi fraternity chapters
- Small trading stations of colonial powers
- "Sufi lodge", known as a khanqah (or tekke)

=== Specific ===
- The Lodge, Australia, the official Canberra residence of the Prime Minister of Australia
- The Lodge (Indianapolis, Indiana), an apartment building on the National Register of Historic Places
- The Lodge (audio mastering), a recording facility in Manhattan, New York City
- The Lodge, an historic building and place name in Apopka, Florida, United States
- John C. Lodge Freeway, colloquially known as the Lodge, a highway in Detroit, Michigan
- RSPB The Lodge, nature reserve and headquarters of the Royal Society for the Protection of Birds
- The Lodge at Pebble Beach, hotel and clubhouse in Pebble Beach, California

== Organizations and enterprises ==
- Lodge (company), an American cookware manufacturer
- Benevolent and Protective Order of Elks, local orders and their meeting halls are called lodges
- Local union, some trade unions have local organizations called lodges
- Grand Lodge of fraternal organization
- Masonic Lodge, the basic organization of Freemasonry
- Odd Fellows Lodge (disambiguation), the basic organisation of the Order of Odd Fellows
- Orange Lodge, the basic organisation of the Orange Institution

== Arts, entertainment, and media ==
=== Music ===
- Lodge (Beaver album) (1999)
- Lodge (Fanu and Bill Laswell album) (2008)
- The Lodge (band), a 1980s art-rock band

=== Television ===
- The Lodge (TV series), 2016 British series based on the Israeli series North Star
- The Lodge, a 1993 British series starring David Thwaites
- "The Lodge", an episode of The Goes Wrong Show

=== Other arts, entertainment, and media ===
- The Lodge (comics), a fictional government organization from Malibu Comics' Ultraverse imprint
- The Lodge (film), a 2019 horror film

== Places ==
=== United States ===
- Lodge, Illinois, an unincorporated community
- Lodge, Missouri, an unincorporated community
- Lodge, South Carolina, a town
- Lodge, Virginia, an unincorporated community

=== Elsewhere ===
- Lodge, County Londonderry, a townland in County Londonderry, Northern Ireland
- Lodge, North Yorkshire, an abandoned hamlet in the parish of Stonebeck Up in North Yorkshire, England
- Lodge Causeway, a road in Bristol
- Lodge Hill, Bristol, a hill and residential area of Bristol, England
- The Lodge, Nova Scotia, Canada

== People ==
- Lodge (surname), a list of people and characters with the surname
  - Lodge family, a New England political family
- Lodge de Montmorency, 1st Viscount Frankfort de Montmorency (1747-1822), Irish politician
- Lodge Kerrigan (born 1964), American screenwriter and film director

== Schools ==
- Lodge School (Malaysia), Kuching, Sarawak, a private school
- The Lodge School, Barbados, a public secondary school

== See also ==
- Gatehouse or "gate lodge", a building round the entrance of a larger building
- Lodge 49, a 2018 AMC-TV series
- Porters' lodge, a place near the entrance of a building where one or more porters can be found
- Sweat lodge, a ceremonial structure used by Native Americans
- Tipi, a conical tent, traditionally made of animal skins, and wooden poles, used by the Native American nomadic tribes of the Great Plains
- Wigwam, a domed, round shelter used by numerous Native American cultures
- Lodging (disambiguation)
- Hunting lodge (disambiguation)
