= Listed buildings in Stonebeck Up =

Stonebeck Up is a civil parish in the county of North Yorkshire, England. It contains five listed buildings that are recorded in the National Heritage List for England. All the listed buildings are designated at Grade II, the lowest of the three grades, which is applied to "buildings of national importance and special interest". The parish contains the village of Middlesmoor and the surrounding countryside and moorland. The listed buildings consist of a farmhouse and barn, a public house and private houses, a church and a telephone kiosk.

== Buildings ==
| Name and location | Photograph | Date | Notes |
|---|---|---|---|
| Low Woodale Farmhouse and barn 54.18936°N 1.87708°W | — | 1687 | The farmhouse and attached barn are in stone, with quoins and roofs of Welsh slate and stone slate with stone coping and shaped kneelers, and both have two storeys. The farmhouse has four bays, and contains a central doorway with a chamfered surround, and a basket-arched lintel, above which is a dated tablet and a hood mould. The windows are mullioned, those on the ground floor with hood moulds. The barn has three bays, and on the ground floor are three doorways and a window, all with chamfered surrounds, The upper floor contains a blind mullioned window and a blind opening. |
| House to left of the Crown Inn; 54.16375°N 1.86060°W | | 1811 | The house is in stone, with quoins, a broken floor band, and a stone slate roof. There are two storeys and two bays. The central doorway has a quoined surround, and above it is a plaque with a moulded oval containing the date and initials. The windows are sashes in plain surrounds. |
| Crown Inn and Post Office; 54.16375°N 1.86047°W | | Early 19th century | The public house and post office are in stone, and have a stone slate roof with stone copings and shaped kneelers on the right. There are two storeys and four bays. On the front are four doorways with quoined surrounds, and the windows are sashes in plain surrounds. |
| St Chad's Church, Middlesmoor; 54.16296°N 1.85974°W | | 1865–66 | The church, designed by W. H. Crossland, is built in stone, and has a Welsh slate roof. It consists of a nave, a north aisle, a south porch, a chancel with a north vestry, and a west tower. The tower has three stages, angle buttresses, bands, and a two-light west window with a hood mould. On the middle stage are two-light windows and clock faces, and above are three-light bell openings with hood moulds, a moulded cornice, and an embattled parapet. |
| Telephone kiosk 54.16350°N 1.86043°W | | 1935 | The telephone kiosk is of the K6 type designed by Giles Gilbert Scott. Constructed in cast iron with a square plan and a dome, it has three unperforated crowns in the top panels. |
