= The Ledge =

The Ledge may refer to:

- The Ledge (film), a 2011 film by Matthew Chapman
- The Ledge (2022 film), a 2022 film by Howard J. Ford, starring Brittany Ashworth
- "The Ledge" (short story), a short story by Stephen King
- "The Ledge" (song), a 1979 song by Fleetwood Mac
- "The Ledge," a song on the album Pleased to Meet Me by The Replacements
- The Ledge, a 2005 short film by Quinn Duffy
- "The Ledge", an informal name for the glass balconies on the observation deck of the Willis Tower, Chicago
- The Ledge, shortened name of the Alberta Legislature Building
- Battle for the Ledge or Operation Krohcol (December 1941), a British operation in the Pacific theatre of WWII

== See also ==
- Ledge (disambiguation)
- The Ledger, a daily newspaper serving Lakeland, Florida
- The Lodge (disambiguation)
