= Lodge, North Yorkshire =

Hamlet in North Yorkshire, England

Coordinates: 54.1919°N 1.9267°W

Lodge
- Hamlet
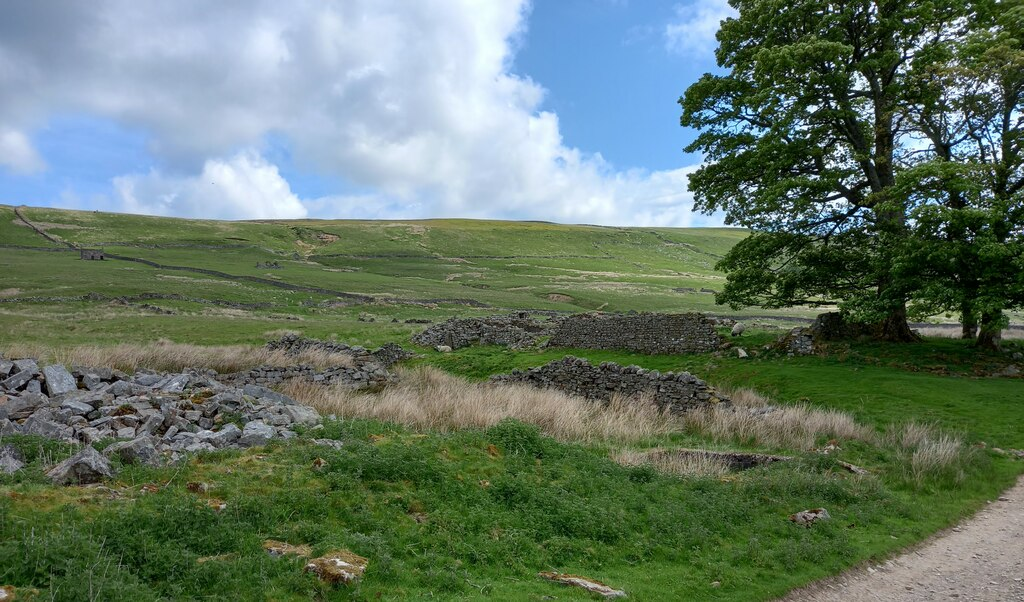
- Remains of Lodge hamlet, Nidderdale

- Location within North Yorkshire
- OS grid reference: SE048773
- Civil parish: Stonebeck Up
- Unitary authority: North Yorkshire
- Ceremonial county: North Yorkshire
- Region: Yorkshire and the Humber
- Country: England
- Sovereign state: United Kingdom

Lodge was a hamlet in upper Nidderdale, North Yorkshire, England. The hamlet was dedicated to farming and was a monastic grange owned by the monks of Byland Abbey. Lodge was 6 miles (9.7 km) east of Kettlewell, 10 miles (16 km) south of Leyburn, and 4 miles (6.4 km) north of Middlesmoor. The hamlet was depopulated after the Bradford Corporation, who were building the reservoirs in the area, bought the land and required the occupants to leave so that their farming activities would not pollute the water being gathered in Scar House Reservoir, which was built below the hamlet in the same valley.

== History ==
The hamlet of Lodge was mentioned in 1198, along with the settlements of Angram, Westhouse and Haden Carr, as belonging to the monks of Byland Abbey. Before the arrival of the reservoir builders, the hamlet was on a busy packhorse route that connected Middlesmoor and Lodge in Nidderdale, with Horsehouse in Coverdale, and beyond into Wensleydale. The old packhorse route across the valley has now been lost under the waters of Scar House Reservoir. It is thought that the hamlet's name derived from the placement of a hunting lodge in the area when it was part of the forest of Nidderdale, although some older maps state the place name to be Lodge Howses, and it is also recorded in documents as Lodg(e)houses in 1577. After the Dissolution of the monasteries, the farming rights of the area and the hamlet fell into private hands. These farmers kept their farms within their families, and records as far back as the 17th century show people gifting their farmsteads to relatives: " In 1623, Thos. Smith, of Lodge in Netherdale, bequeaths his property to his son, named after my own name."

The hamlet was located on Carle Fell Road, an east/west running road that connected with the road to Coverdale just to the west of the hamlet, and also a road which went westwards the 6 miles (9.7 km) to Kettlewell. The road to Coverdale connected it with Leyburn, 10 miles (16 km) northwards, and Middlesmoor, 4 miles (6.4 km) southwards. It is thought that Lodge, along with other smaller settlements, were built on the north side of the valley as it afforded some protection from the elements having a large ridge behind them, but also they were facing south, and so could take advantage of the sun. A Methodist chapel was built in Lodge in 1858, although it only served twelve people, and the minister was located at Middlesmoor. The chapel building itself was an extension of a cart shed that already existed in the village. A map of the area from 1890 shows around ten buildings in the hamlet, with the Methodist chapel at the east end of the settlement. A description of the hamlet by Speight in 1906 details it as having "three farms and a cottage".

Lodge was abandoned in 1929 when the Bradford Corporation bought the land and asked the farmers to vacate the land to prevent the water entering the reservoir from becoming polluted; the corporation actually bought up all the land it needed, including at Lodge, in 1904. Until it was depopulated, Lodge had the highest farm workings in the valley, which were about 460 metres (1,500 ft) above sea level, but the settlement itself was slightly lower at 360 metres (1,180 ft). Lodge was one of the few settlements in the upper Nidderdale valley which was not abandoned due to the reservoir's waters; Haden Carr, Angram, and West Houses were all flooded and so had to be evacuated. As the hamlet was depopulated within living memory and the relatives of the last known occupant still live in Nidderdale, the site of the settlement has been the subject of archaeological studies to provide more context on farming communities in upper Nidderdale.

Close to the hamlet on the north side of the valley is Dead Man's Hill (546 metres (1,791 ft) above sea level). The hill is so named after the discovery of three headless bodies buried there in 1728. (Note: An entry in the township books for Middlesmoor dated 30 may 1728 states that "three murder'd Bodies were found burr'd on Lodge End without heads.. [sic].") It is thought that they were Scottish pedlars who were robbed and murdered whilst travelling the packhorse route between Coverdale and Nidderdale. Previous to the discovery of the bodies, the hill was known as Nidderhow.

=== Administrative history ===
Historically in the Wapentake of Staincross, the hamlet was in the parish of Kirkby Malzeard until 1866, when it became part of the parish of Stonebeck Up which was in the Wapentake of Lower Claro. The hamlet used to be under the township of Settle, in the West Riding of Yorkshire, (Note: Up until 1974, the area was in the West Riding of Yorkshire. It was moved into North Yorkshire in 1974.) for administrative and postal responsibilities, and up until 1974, it was in the Pateley Bridge Rural District. A map from 1948 shows lodge at SE049773 and in the parish of Stonebeck Up, and the location remains within the same parish today.
