= Church of St Chad, Middlesmoor =

Anglican church in North Yorkshire England

Church of St Chad
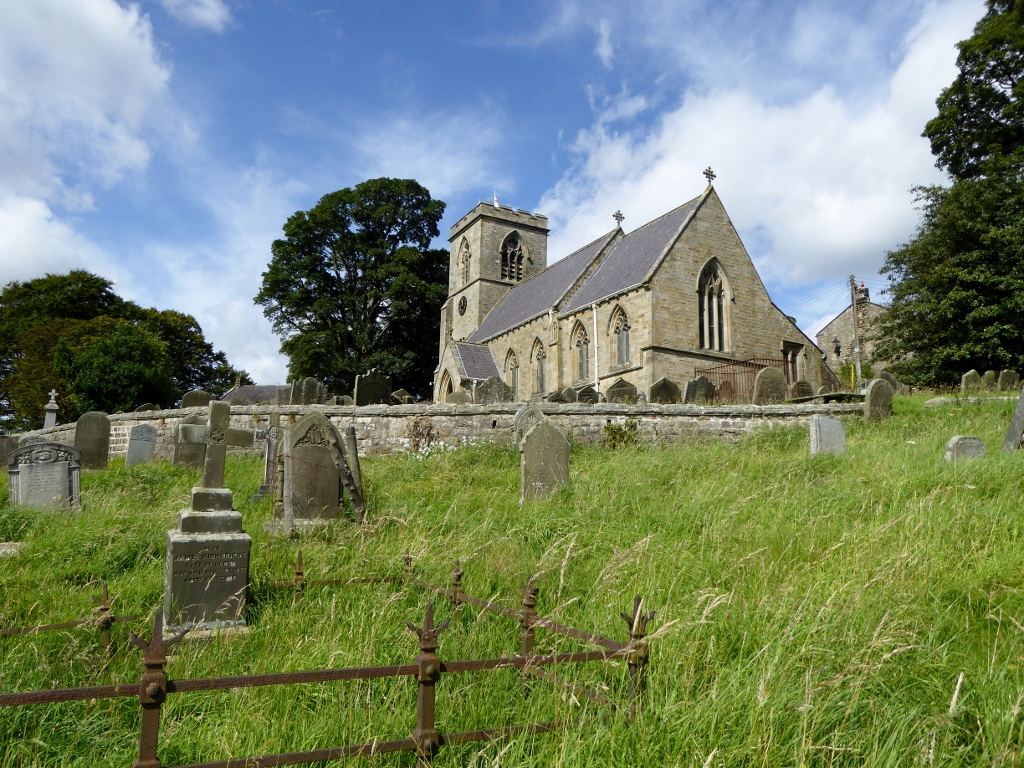
- St. Chad's, Middlesmoor
- Church of St Chad
- 54.163°N 1.859°W
- OS grid reference: SE092741
- Location: Middlesmoor, North Yorkshire
- Country: England
- Denomination: Anglican
- Website: www.achurchnearyou.com/church/3362/

History
- Dedication: St Chad

Architecture
- Functional status: Active
- Completed: 1866

Administration
- Diocese: Diocese of Leeds
- Archdeaconry: Richmond and Craven
- Deanery: Ripon
- Benefice: Upper Nidderdale
- Parish: Upper Nidderdale

Listed Building – Grade II
- Designated: 6 March 1967
- Reference no.: 1174129

The Church of St Chad is a grade II listed structure in the village of Middlesmoor, in Upper Nidderdale, North Yorkshire, England. The church was built in 1866 to replace an earlier chapel on the site, and prior to a burial ground being consecrated, funerals and burials had to take place at Kirkby Malzeard, under which ecclesiastical parish the church fell under. The church is located on high ground (about 920 feet (280 m) above sea level) between the valleys of the River Nidd and How Stean Gorge; its elevated position means it looks over the valley southwards, and is sometimes declared as having one of the best views from any church in England. The church's dedication to St Chad is due to the presence of a stone cross (now on display in the church) which was said to have been carved by St Chad himself.

== History ==
Although the current church was built in 1866, a chapel previously existed on the site which was consecrated in 1484. A document uncovered at the church in 1748 stated that the then Archbishop of York consecrated the church on its building, and later consecrated the burial ground. Up until the building of the chapel, christenings and burials had to be undertaken at Kirkby Malzeard, some 10 miles (16 km) to the east in the adjoining valley, and as such, the chapel at Middlesmoor was a daughter church to that at Kirkby Malzeard and was described as parochial chapel in the period up to the Reformation. The necessity to carry corpses over to Kirkby Malzeard required the building of a bridge over the River Nidd at Wath-in-Nidderdale.

The chapel had a nave, chancel, porch and a low square tower at the west end. Due to a slope, the roof on the north side was only 2 feet (0.61 m) above the ground. In June 1775, the chapel roof was removed and the walls were raised. Until it was rebuilt in 1866, the chapel, which had 400 sittings, had no dedication and was not in any diocese, being wholly controlled by the vicar at Kirkby Malzeard. Through a special agreement with the Prebend of Masham and the vicar of Kirkby Malzeard, all holy offices (burials, weddings baptisms etc) were able to be carried out at Middlesmoor without the inhabitants having to travel over into the adjacent valley of the River Ure where the mother church at Kirkby Malzeard was.

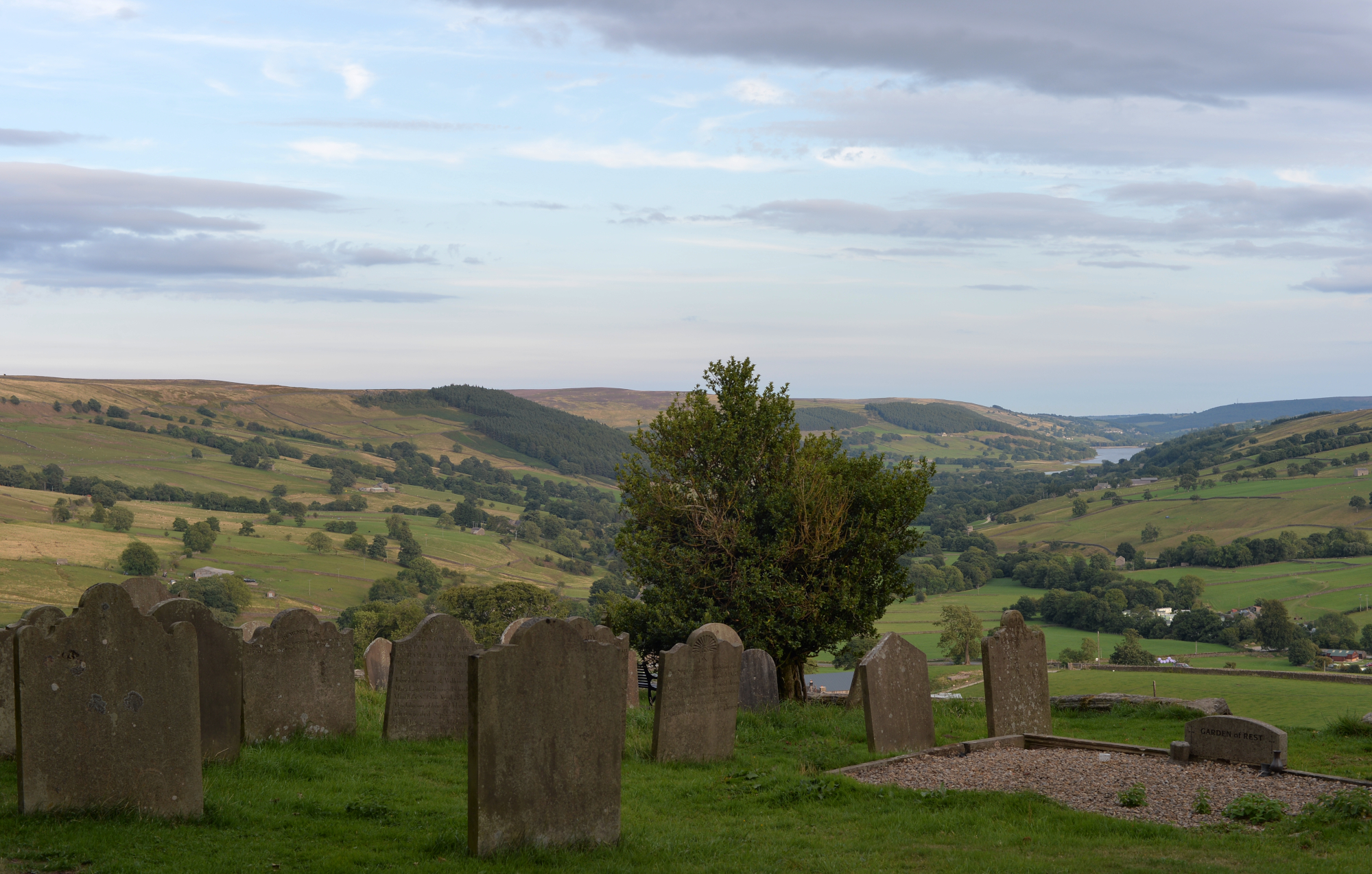
The graveyard and view down the valley

The chapel was rebuilt as a church between 1865 and 1866 (opening in September 1866) (Note: Historic England state the renovation/rebuild occurred in 1864, but the contract was not awarded to Crossland until 1865.) in a Decorated style to a design by William Henry Crossland; it has a nave with a north aisle a chancel, and a west tower which Pevsner described as "Dull." The church building covers an area of 2,630 square feet (244 m^{2}), is built with coursed, square stone, with ashlar dressings and the roof is made of Welsh slate. Although Crossland was briefed with a rebuild, the works were described by Binns as effectively being an entirely new build. Crossland re-used many of the churches notable artefacts such as the cross of St Chad, the font and three windows in the new structure, and it was gutted throughout with local marble being used in the building. The rebuilding of 1865 replaced the windows and many of the pillars and arches were reconstructed. The font has four sides each engraved with a depiction of one of the Four Evangelists, and was thought to be Saxon or Norman in origin, but there is no archaeological evidence of this. The tower is fitted with six bells; the tenor bell's striking note is F#. The bells were new when the church was rebuilt in 1865, and these bells were refurbished in 2000. The church was grade II listed in 1967.

The church's dedication to St Chad is related to a local legend that St Chad came to the area to preach, and stuck a stone cross into the ground to mark the occasion. The cross, parts of which were found in the churchyard, is now contained within the church, but archaeological evidence points to it dating from the 10th or 11th centuries, whereas St Chad was alive in the 7th century. The head of the cross was discovered underneath the church during the rebuild of 1865 and when placed upon the base, reaches to a height of 6 feet (1.8 m).

The churchyard, which is set in two stages of upper and lower due to the downward slope to the south, was officially closed in 1877 when it measured 0.653 acres (0.264 ha); however, interments continued as it contains one Commonwealth War Grave from the First World War era, and a war memorial. The church is set atop a slope on high ground about 280 metres (920 ft) above sea level which has a view southwards over the Upper Nidderdale valley which is said to be one of the best views from a church in England; Clare Balding commented that the view was probably the best view in the world from a church. The view from the valley upwards towards the church has a similar effect; "..spectacular topography presents the church as an iconic landmark so often photographed from the lower lying land to the south."

== Parish ==
As a chapel, it was in the parish of Kirkby Malzeard which was part of the Peculier of Masham in the 18th and 19th centuries. The parish records detail some of the local history over the years, such as the baptism of Eugene Aram at Middlesmoor in 1704, and two people who were "rebuked in 1772 for squabbling in Middlesmoor church [sic]. It was created as its own independent parish on 28 July 1863. The church is in the parish and benefice of Upper Nidderdale which is in the deanery of Ripon, the archdeaconry of Richmond and Craven and the Diocese of Leeds. Historically, it had been within the Diocese of York, then was moved into the Diocese of Chester.

== See also ==
- Listed buildings in Stonebeck Up
