= Rochdale Cenotaph =

War memorial in Rochdale, Greater Manchester

- United Kingdom
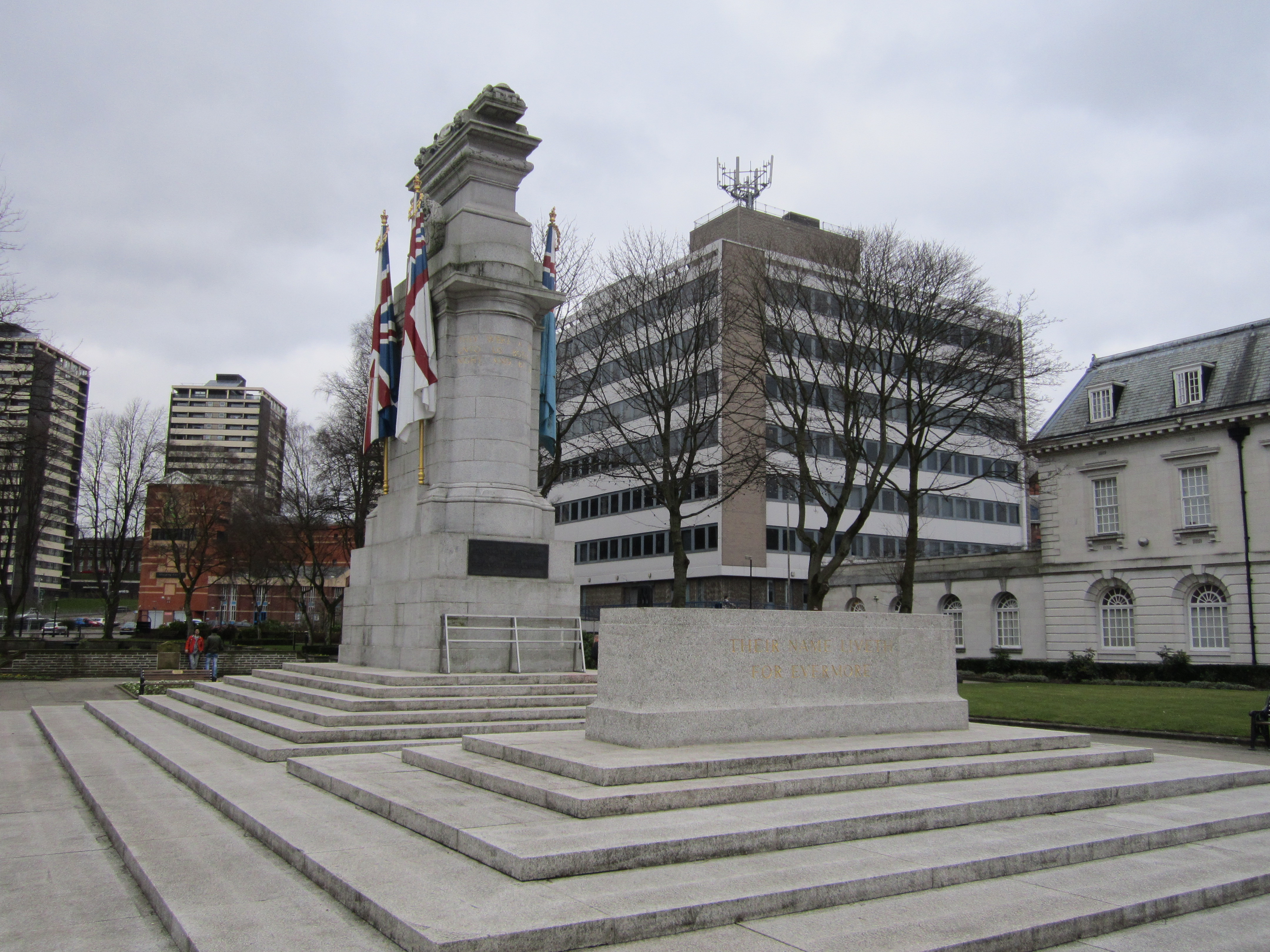
- For servicemen from Rochdale killed in the First World War
- Unveiled: 1922; 104 years ago
- Location: 53°36′59″N 2°09′35″W; Rochdale town centre, Greater Manchester, England
- Designed by: Sir Edwin Lutyens
- TO THE MEMORY OF THE MEN OF ROCHDALE WHO GAVE THEIR LIVES IN THE GREAT WAR / THEY WERE A WALL UNTO US BOTH BY NIGHT AND BY DAY

Listed Building – Grade I
- Official name: Rochdale Cenotaph
- Designated: 12 February 1985
- Reference no.: 1084274

Rochdale Cenotaph is a First World War memorial on the Esplanade in Rochdale, Greater Manchester, in the north west of England. Designed by Sir Edwin Lutyens, it is one of seven memorials in England based on his Cenotaph in London and one of his more ambitious designs. The memorial was unveiled in 1922 and consists of a raised platform bearing Lutyens' characteristic Stone of Remembrance next to a 10-metre (33 ft) pylon topped by an effigy of a recumbent soldier. A set of painted stone flags surrounds the pylon.

A public meeting in February 1919 established a consensus to create a monument and a fund for the families of wounded servicemen. The meeting agreed to commission Lutyens to design the monument. His design for a bridge over the River Roch was abandoned after a local dignitary purchased a plot of land adjacent to Rochdale Town Hall and donated it for the site of the memorial. Lutyens revised his design, and Edward Stanley, 17th Earl of Derby, unveiled the memorial on 26 November 1922. It is a Grade I listed building, having been upgraded in 2015 when Lutyens' war memorials were declared a national collection.

== Background ==
In the aftermath of the First World War and its unprecedented casualties, thousands of war memorials were built across Britain. Almost all towns and cities erected some form of memorial to commemorate their fallen. The mayor of Rochdale called a public meeting on 10 February 1919, three months after the armistice, to discuss proposals for the town's commemorations. Consensus was that the town should have a monument and a fund to provide for wounded servicemen, their families, and the families of the 2,000 war dead from Rochdale. Public subscription raised £29,443 10s, covering the £12,611 cost of the memorial.

== Commissioning ==
The public meeting in February 1919 agreed to appoint Sir Edwin Lutyens as architect for the project. He was one of the most prominent designers of war memorials in Britain, described by Historic England as "the leading English architect of his generation". Before the war, Lutyens established a reputation designing country houses for wealthy patrons, but the war had a profound effect on him. From 1917 onwards, he dedicated much of his time to memorialising the casualties. He went on to design The Cenotaph on Whitehall in London, which became the focus for the national Remembrance Sunday commemorations and subsequently the Thiepval Memorial to the Missing on the Somme in France and many other memorials in Britain and the Commonwealth.

Lutyens proposed a memorial bridge crossing the River Roch in front of Rochdale Town Hall. At that time the river flowed openly through the town centre but has since been culverted. On either side of the bridge would have been recumbent effigies of a soldier lying on a bier and a Stone of Remembrance on the bridge. The plan was abandoned when Alderman William Cunliffe, a former mayor, bought a dilapidated 18th-century house (known as "the Manor House" or "the Orchard") on the opposite side of the river and donated the site for the war memorial. The site had particular poignancy as the building had been used as a recruiting station during the war. Lutyens' new design involved demolishing the Manor House to make way for a cenotaph and a Stone of Remembrance. Lutyens designed the stone for use in Imperial War Graves Commission cemeteries but it also features in several of his war memorials. Rochdale's cenotaph is among seven others by Lutyens in England based on the one on Whitehall, and is among the most ambitious of his designs to come to fruition.

== Design ==
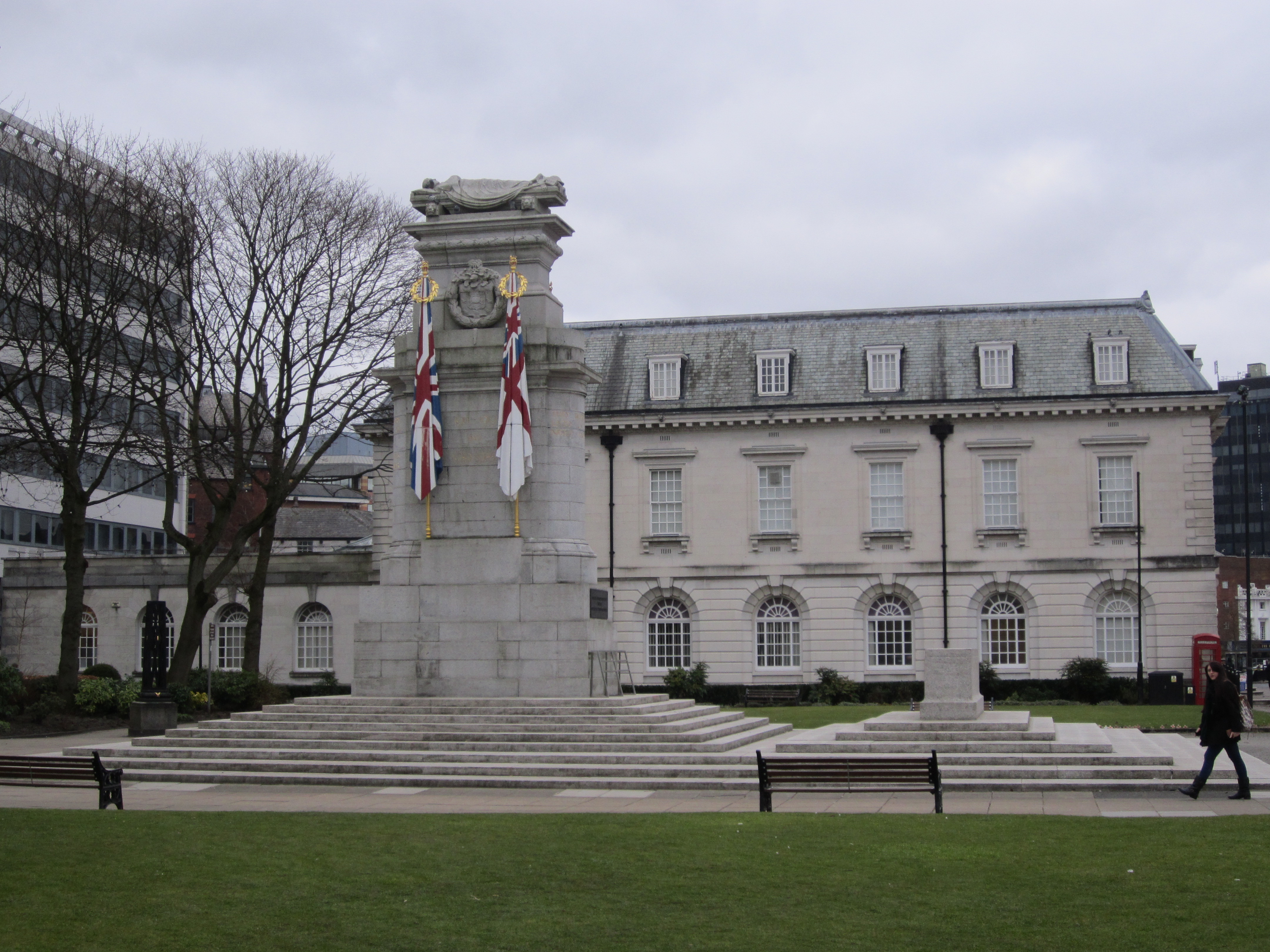
The war memorial comprises a cenotaph beside a Stone of Remembrance

The memorial was constructed by Hobson Limited of Nottingham. While many First World War memorials feature sculpture or overt religious symbolism, Rochdale's, like many of Lutyens' memorials, uses abstract and ecumenical shapes inspired by classical architecture. It comprises two elements: a 10-metre (33 ft) pylon and a Stone of Remembrance formed from light grey Cornish granite which are raised on a platform (stylobate) of three steps. The cenotaph is raised on six steps on the platform, and rises in diminishing tiers of broadly rectangular cross section, with its long axis oriented southeast to northwest. On the plain first tier are four carved and painted stone flags with gilt bronze poles, two to either side: the Union Flag and the White Ensign on the southwest side, and the Royal Air Force Ensign and the Red Ensign on the northeast. The flags flank a second, smaller, tier which has a semi-column at either end and which culminates in a smaller plinth supporting a catafalque. At the top is a sculpture of a recumbent soldier draped with his coat. The design for the pylon is based on Lutyens' Midland Railway War Memorial, unveiled in Derby in 1921. Painted stone flags are a recurring feature in Lutyens' war memorial designs. He first proposed them for Whitehall's Cenotaph, where they were rejected in favour of fabric flags, but they appear on several of his other memorials including Northampton War Memorial and Leicester's Arch of Remembrance.

The memorial is not strictly a cenotaph as the sculpture at the top is a human figure rather than an empty tomb. By raising the figure above the ground on the pylon, Lutyens gives him anonymity, representing the fallen while allowing onlookers to impart their own emotions onto the memorial. By placing the figure at the top of the pylon, Lutyens also draws attention to the detail at the top of the pylon, connecting the beauty of the design to the memory of the fallen soldier. To either side of the plinth, above the flags, carved wreaths surround Rochdale's coat of arms. The central part of the structure is inscribed in gold lettering: 1914–1919 / 1939–1945; TO THE MEMORY OF THE MEN OF ROCHDALE WHO GAVE THEIR LIVES IN THE GREAT WAR; MCMXIV + MCMXIX / ET / MCMXXXIX + MCMXLV and THEY WERE A WALL UNTO US BOTH BY NIGHT AND BY DAY—a quotation from the First Book of Samuel, chapter 25, verse 16, selected from suggestions made by readers of the Rochdale Observer.

The Stone of Remembrance lies to the southeast between the cenotaph and the town hall, raised above the platform by three steps. It is inscribed: THEIR NAME LIVETH FOR EVERMORE. Other inscriptions commemorating the dead of the Second World War were added later, including a bronze plaque reading TO ALL THOSE WHO DIED / IN THE / SERVICE OF THEIR COUNTRY. The use of a cenotaph with a Stone of Remembrance at its feet is reminiscent of Southampton Cenotaph, Lutyens' first to come to fruition. The surrounding memorial gardens are dedicated to the members of the Lancashire Fusiliers and the Royal Regiment of Fusiliers and serve as Rochdale's memorial to the Second World War.

Detail of parts of the memorial

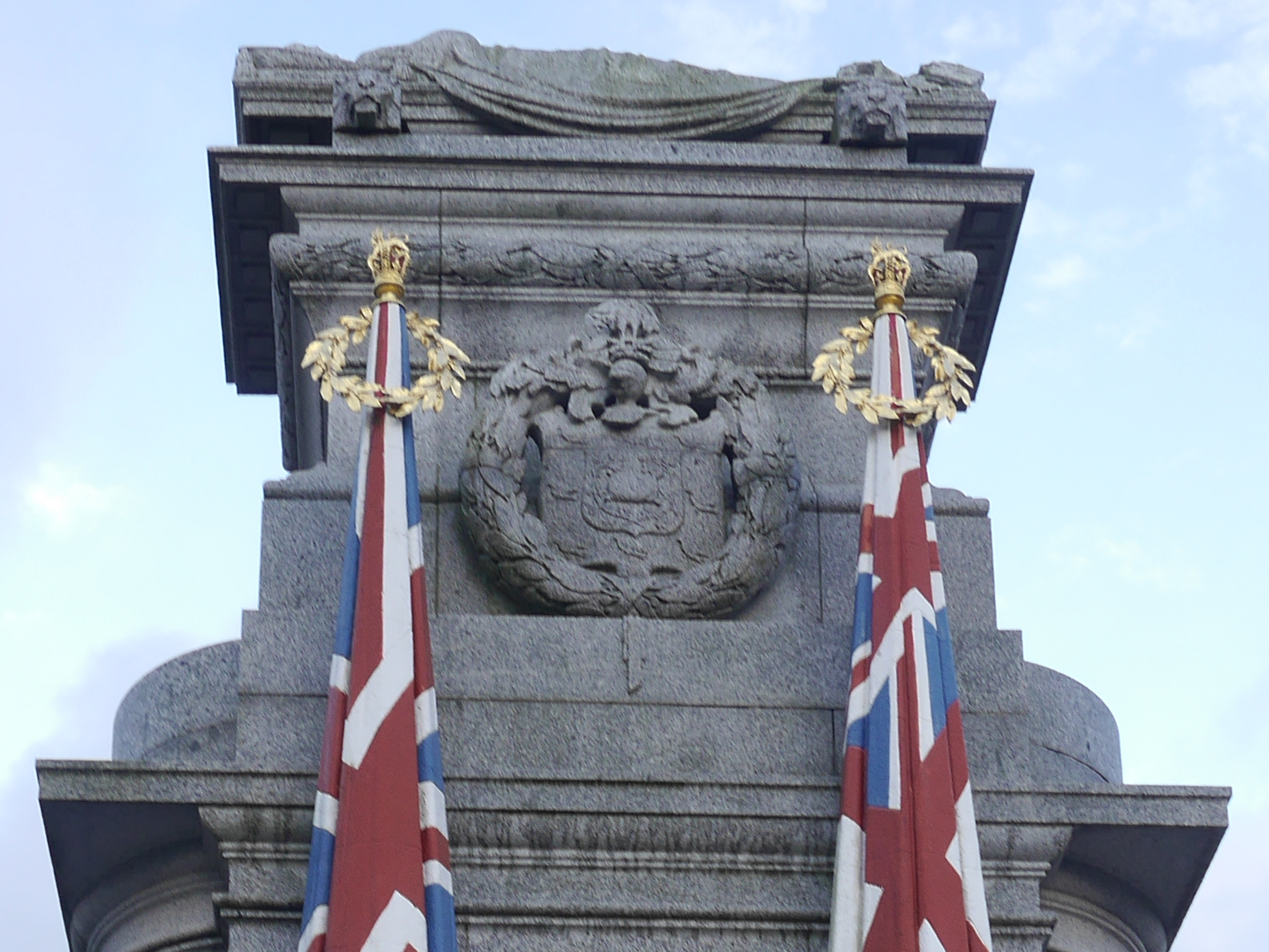
Northeast flags and carved wreath enclosing the arms of Rochdale

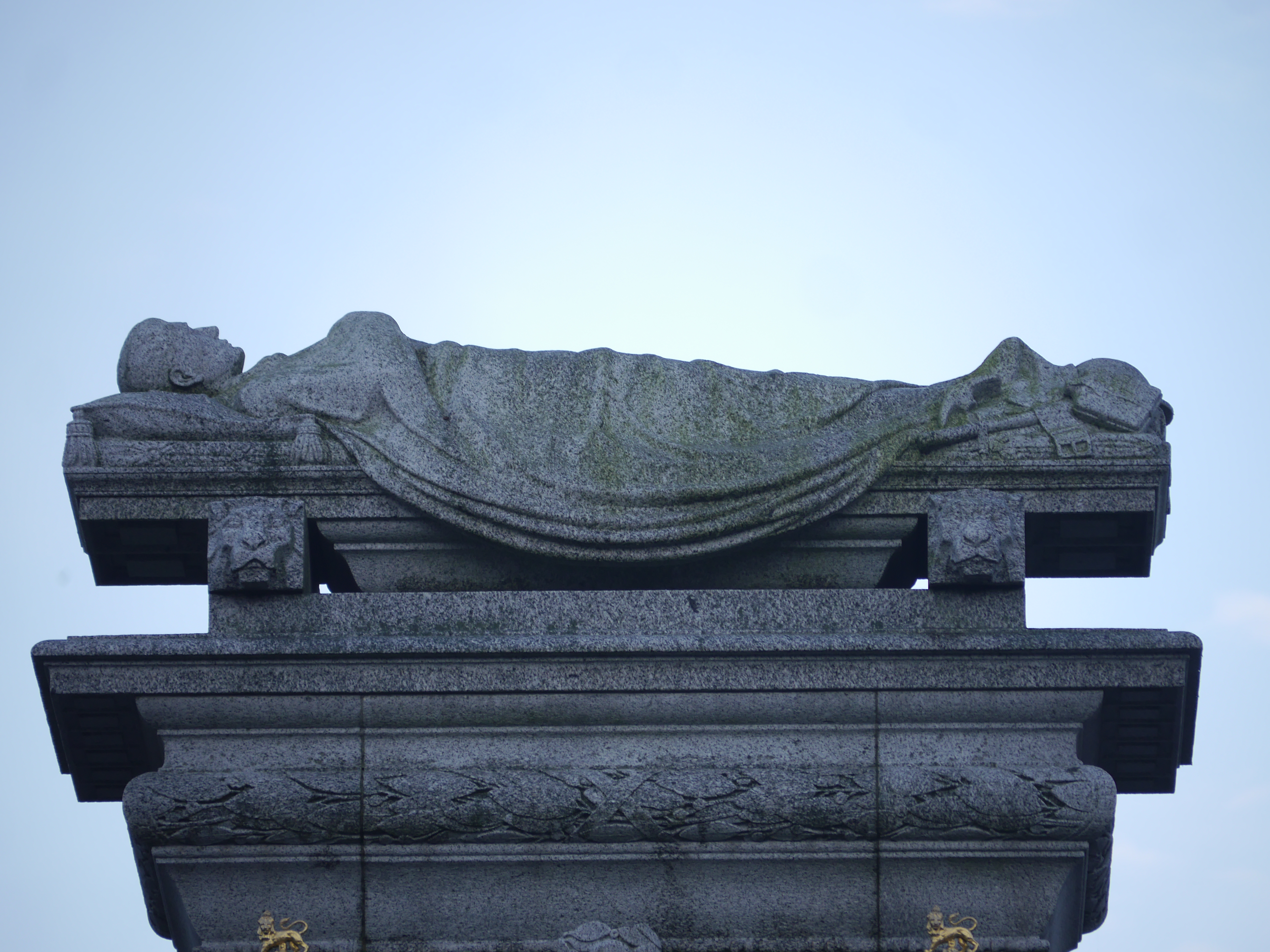
Sculpture on top of the memorial

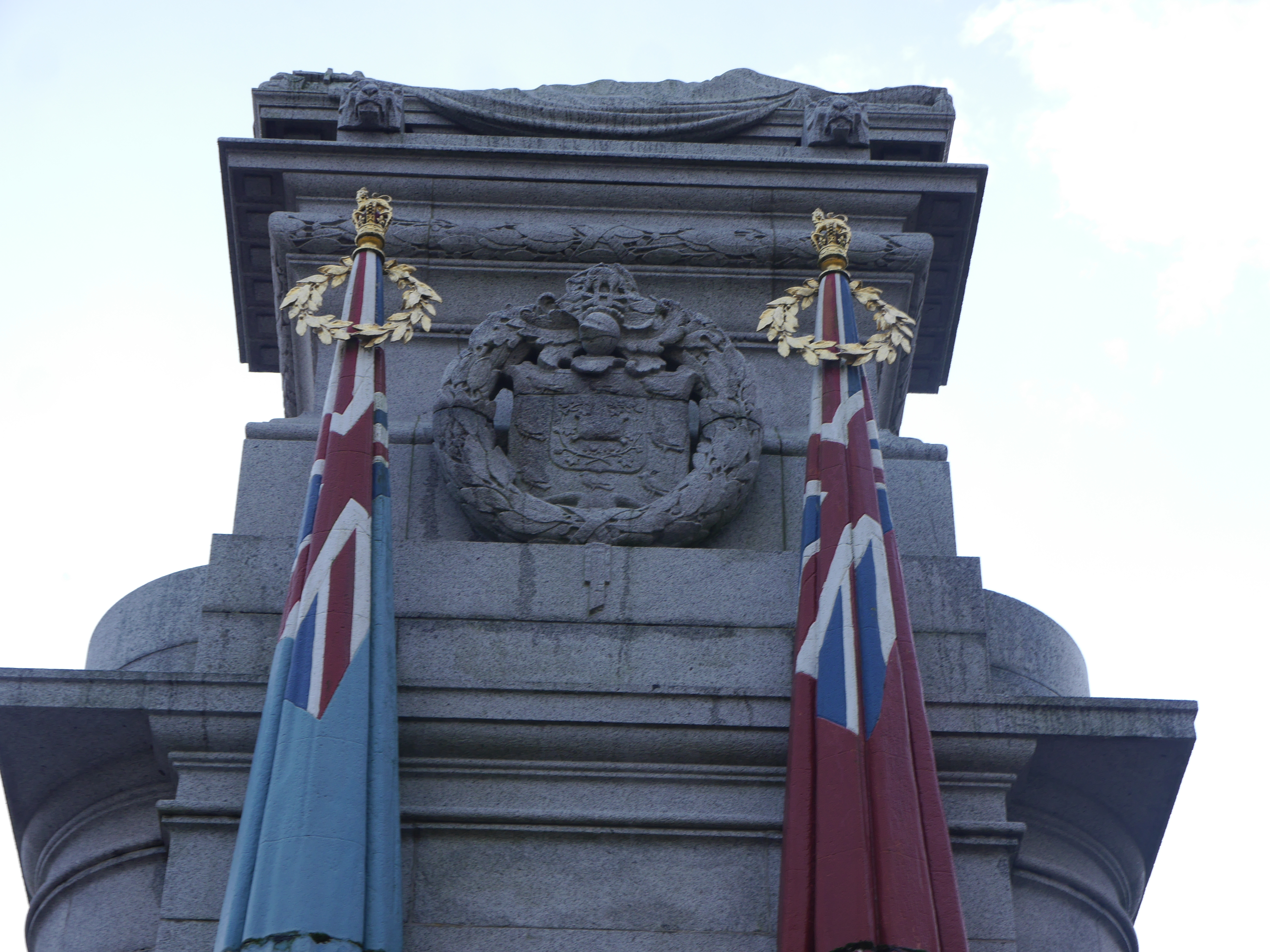
Southwest flags and carved wreath enclosing the arms of Rochdale

== History ==
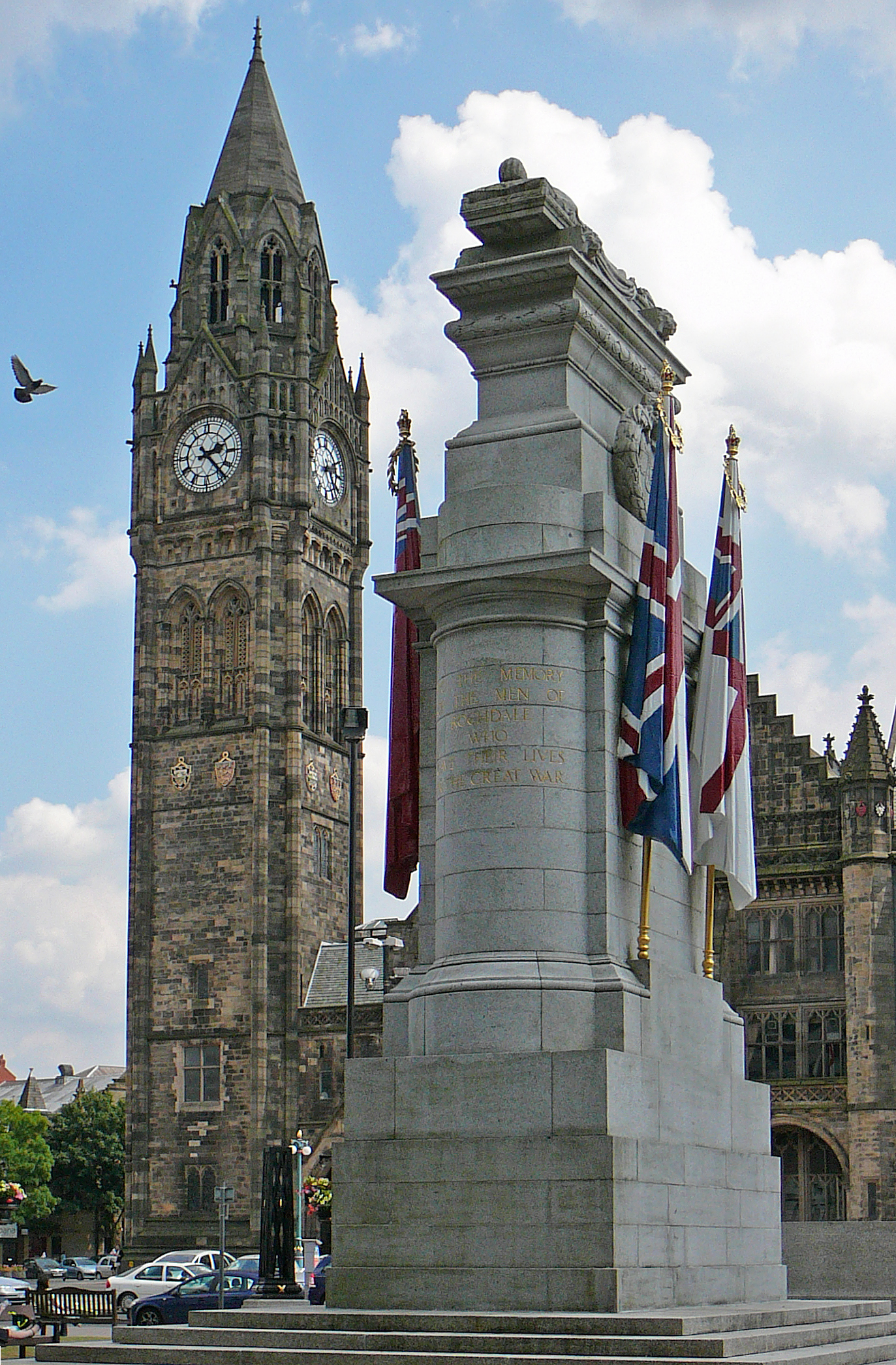
The cenotaph, with the tower of Rochdale Town Hall in the background

Edward Stanley, 17th Earl of Derby, unveiled the memorial on Sunday 26 November 1922 and the Archdeacon of Rochdale gave a dedication. Derby was a descendant of a Lancashire family involved in local politics for generations. He served in various public offices during the First World War, including Director General of Recruiting and Secretary of State for War, before being appointed Britain's ambassador to France at the end of the war. Two years after unveiling the Rochdale memorial, Lord Derby presided over the unveiling of Manchester Cenotaph, another Lutyens design. Restoration work was carried out on the memorial in 2019, for which the companies involved were nominated for awards due to the quality of the work.

The memorial was vandalised in November 2023—the words "Free Palestine" were daubed across it in red spray paint. Two teenagers were arrested and charged with criminal damage. In a separate incident, several wreaths laid at the cenotaph were damaged. As a result, the police placed the cenotaph under guard in the run-up to Remembrance Sunday.

Rochdale Cenotaph was designated as a Grade II listed building on 12 February 1985, the designation noting the cenotaph's visual relationship with Rochdale Town Hall, Rochdale Post Office, and a set of lamp posts (each of which are listed in their own right). The status offers legal protection from demolition or modification; Grade II is applied to structures of "special interest, warranting every effort to preserve them", about 92 per cent of listed buildings. In November 2015, as part of commemorations for the centenary of the First World War, Lutyens' war memorials were recognised as a "national collection". All his free-standing memorials in England were listed or had their listing status reviewed and National Heritage List for England entries were updated and expanded. As a result, Rochdale Cenotaph was upgraded to Grade I, which is applied to around 2.5% of listed buildings, those of "the greatest historic interest".

== See also ==
- Lancashire Fusiliers War Memorial, another Lutyens war memorial in nearby Bury
- Grade I listed buildings in Greater Manchester
- Grade I listed war memorials in England
- Listed buildings in Rochdale
