= William Henry Crossland =

English architect

William Henry Crossland FRIBA
- Born: 1835; Yorkshire, England
- Died: 14 November 1908 (aged 73); London, England
- Citizenship: British
- Occupation: Architect
- Spouse: Lavinia Cardwell Pigot (m. 1859; died 1876)
- Partner: Eliza Ruth Hatt (died 1892)
- Children: Two (one illegitimate)
- Awards: Fellow of the Royal Institute of British Architects, 1867
- Buildings: Rochdale Town Hall (1864–71); Holloway Sanatorium (1872–85); Royal Holloway College (1879–87)

William Henry Crossland FRIBA (Yorkshire, 1835 – London, 14 November 1908), known professionally as W.H. Crossland, was a 19th-century English architect and a pupil of George Gilbert Scott. His architectural works included the design of three buildings that are now Grade I listed – Rochdale Town Hall, Holloway Sanatorium and Royal Holloway College.

== Early life and education ==
Crossland was born in 1835 to a family living in Huddersfield. (Note: Edward Law points out that as "despite extensive searches no record can be found of his baptism" his precise date and place of birth remain unknown. Law, Part 1. Retrieved 18 February 2021.) He was the younger son of Henry Crossland, who is recorded in the 1851 census as being a farmer and quarry owner, and his wife, Ellen (née Wilkinson). He had an elder brother, James, born in 1833.

Crossland enrolled at Huddersfield College, where he excelled in writing and drawing. In the early 1850s Crossland became a pupil of George Gilbert Scott at his architectural practice in London. He worked with Scott on the design of the model village Akroydon, near Halifax, West Yorkshire, commissioned by the worsted manufacturer, Edward Akroyd.

== Principal works ==
Crossland, who was elected a Fellow of the Royal Institute of British Architects in 1867, developed his own architectural practice, with offices in Halifax and Leeds, before moving to London and then, in 1879, opening an office in Egham, Surrey. More than 25 of the buildings he designed are listed by Historic England.

Crossland's three most important commissions, all now Grade I listed, were:

- Rochdale Town Hall, which was built 1866–71 and is still in use as a municipal building in Rochdale, now in Greater Manchester, where it functions as the ceremonial headquarters of Rochdale Metropolitan Borough Council. Architectural historian Nikolaus Pevsner described the building as possessing a "rare picturesque beauty". Its stained glass windows are credited as "the finest modern examples of their kind". Historic England describe it as "an important early departure from High Victorian heaviness" and say it is "widely recognised as being one of the finest municipal buildings in the country". Following a fire, Crossland's original clock tower was replaced in 1887 by a stone clock tower and spire designed by Alfred Waterhouse in the style of Manchester Town Hall.
- Holloway Sanatorium at Virginia Water, Surrey, which was built 1873–85. This was a project commissioned by the entrepreneur and philanthropist Thomas Holloway. Historic England describe it as "the most elaborate and impressive Victorian lunatic asylum in England, because it was the most lavish to be built for private patients... The quality of the external design and the decoration of the principal spaces is exceptional". It is the only example of a Sanatorium to be listed at Grade I. It was restored in 1997–98 and converted to luxury homes as part of a gated residential estate known as Virginia Park.
- Royal Holloway College, Egham, Surrey, which was built 1879–87. A short distance away from the Sanatorium, it was also commissioned by Thomas Holloway. Now known as Founder's Building, it is the main building of a major college of the University of London; its cafe/bar is named "Crosslands". Crossland's main floor plan for the college is on display in the Royal Holloway College Picture Gallery.

The Holloway Sanatorium and Royal Holloway College were inspired by the Cloth Hall of Ypres in Belgium and the Château de Chambord in the Loire Valley, France, respectively and are considered by some to be among the most remarkable buildings in the south of England.

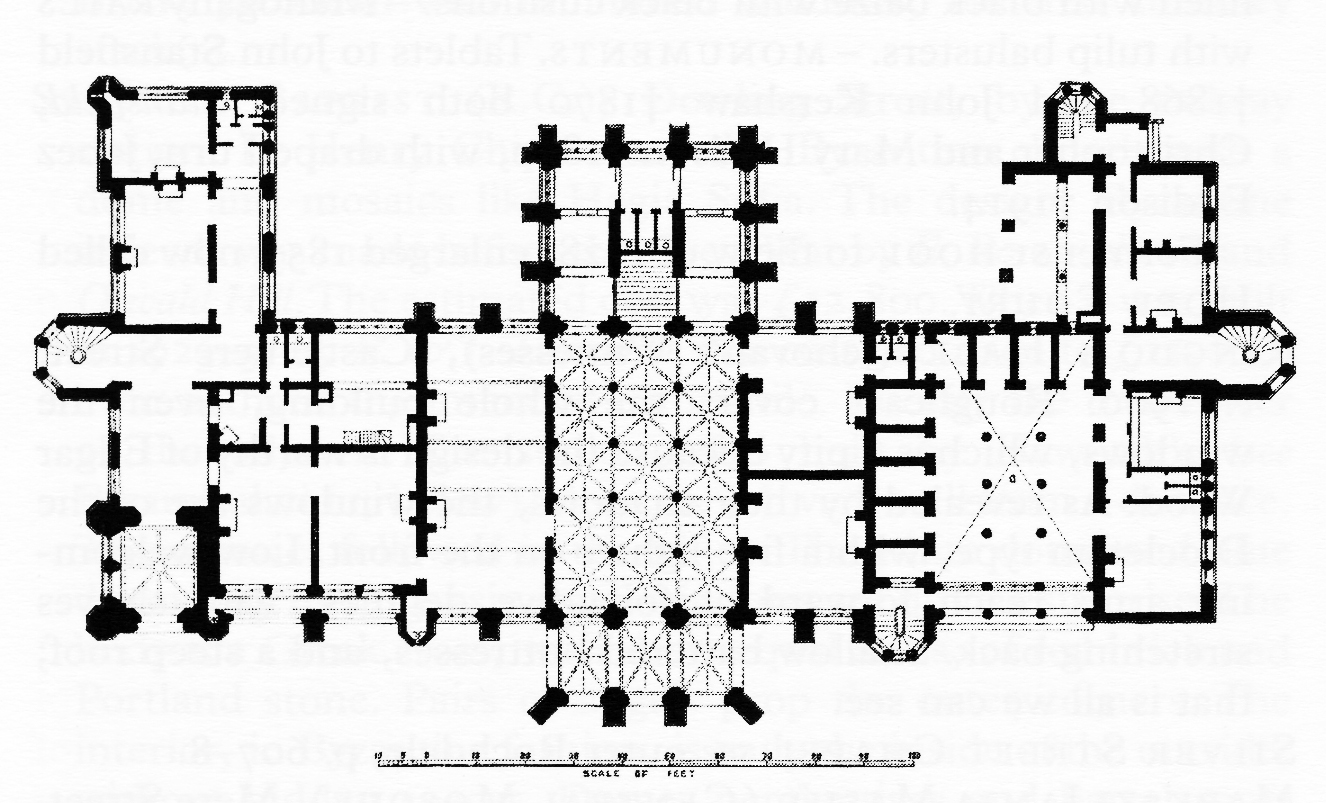
Crossland's plan of Rochdale Town Hall, published in The Builder in 1866

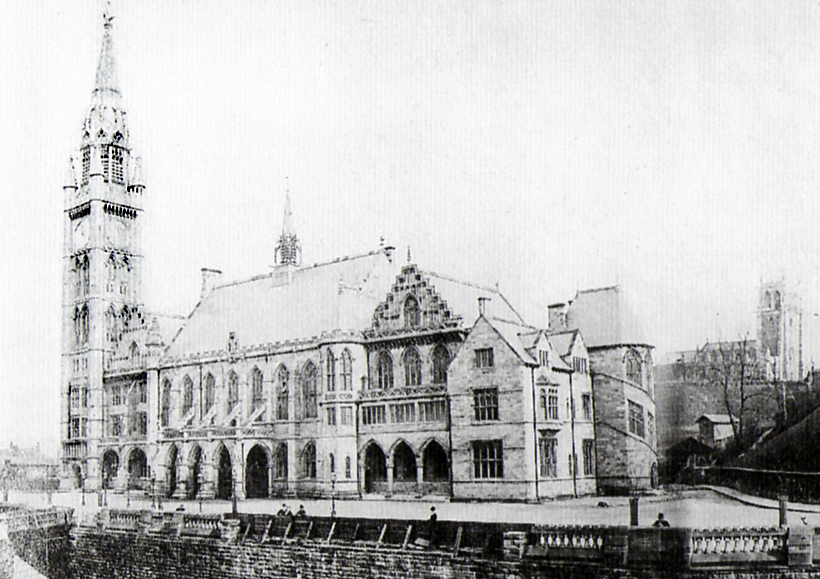
Rochdale Town Hall (1874) with Crossland's original clock tower

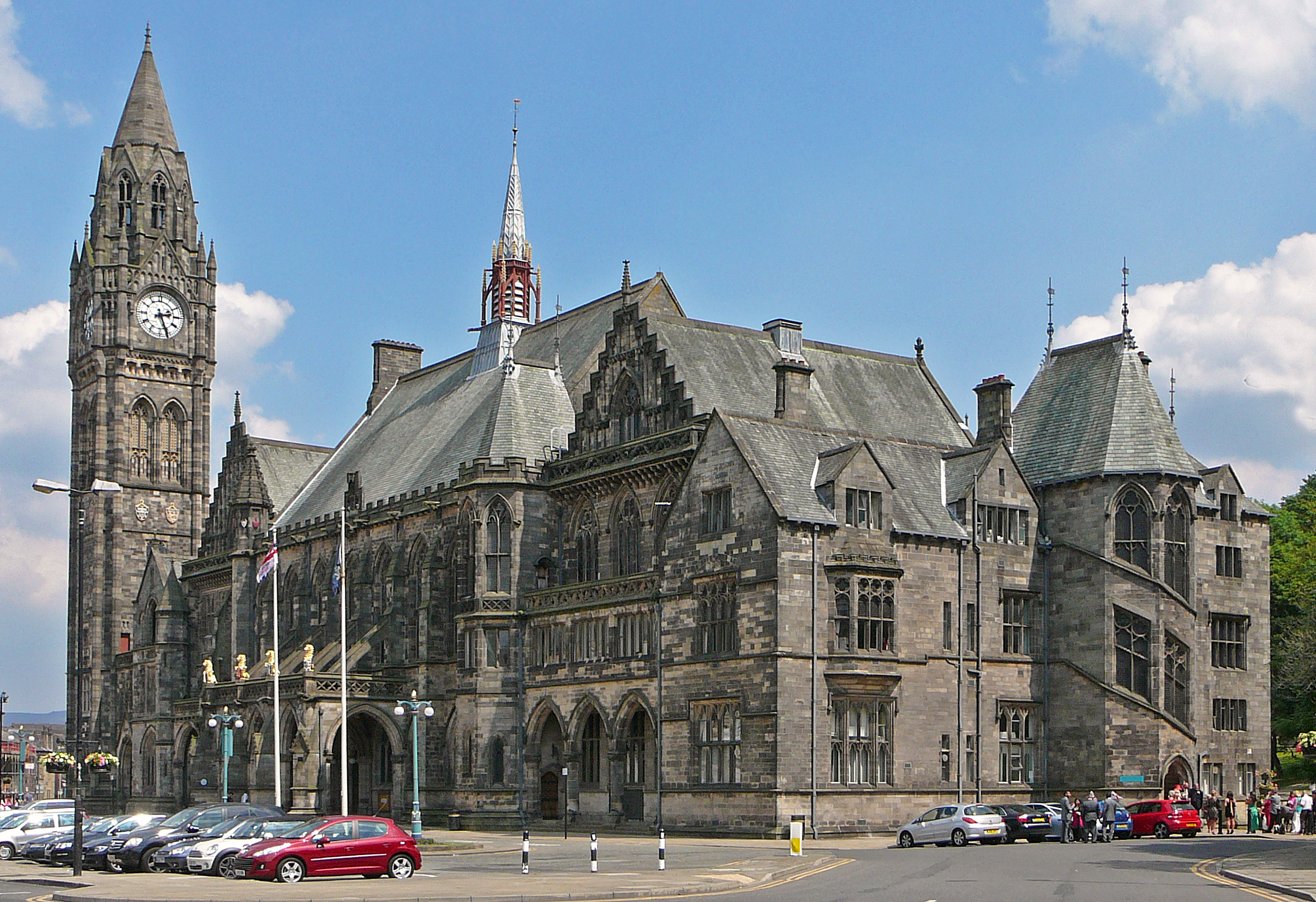
Rochdale Town Hall with tower as rebuilt (1887) to Alfred Waterhouse's design

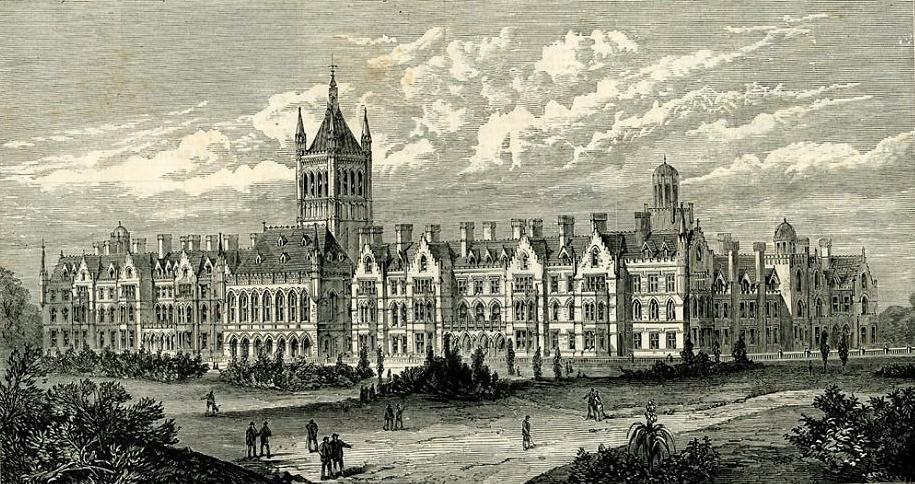
Holloway Sanatorium, Virginia Water, Surrey (1884). Wood-engraving in the Illustrated London News, 5 January 1884

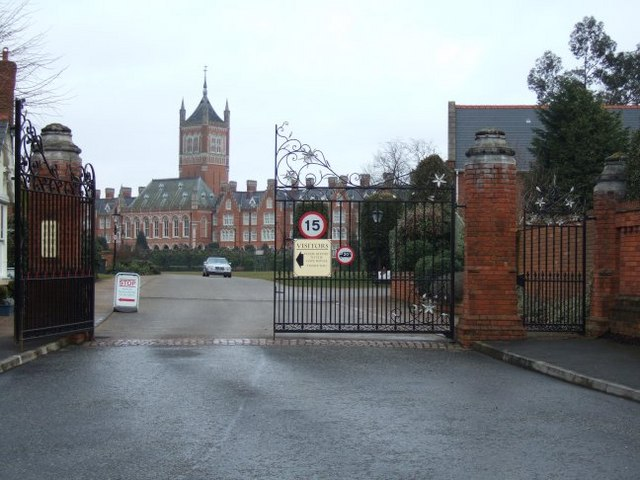
Holloway Sanatorium, now a private residential estate

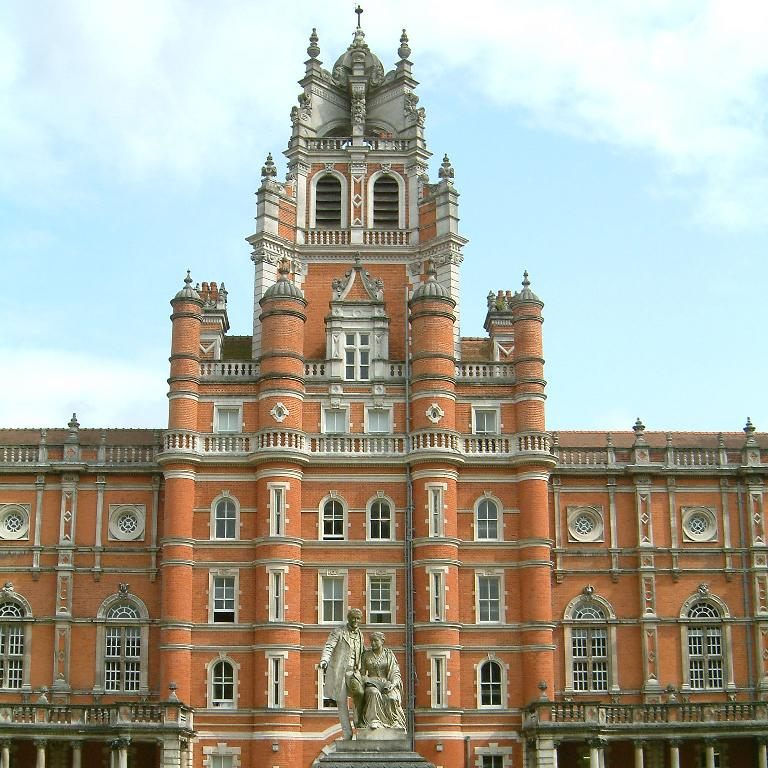
South Quadrangle, Founder's Building, Royal Holloway, University of London, Egham, Surrey

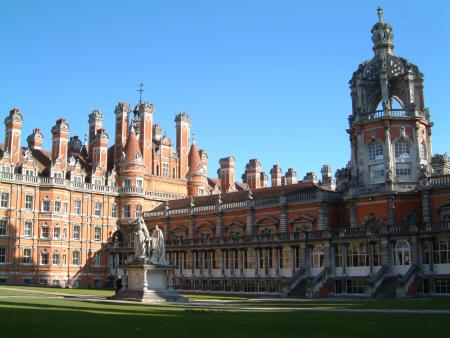
North Quadrangle, Founder's Building, Royal Holloway

== Other significant works ==
In her biography of Crossland, published in 2020, Sheila Binns provides the most complete list yet of his architectural commissions, drawing on and supplementing earlier work by John Elliott, itself based on a compilation by Edward Law. Those that are listed by Historic England, many of them in Yorkshire, are included here.

=== Berkshire ===
Location	Description	Dates	Listing	Notes	Refs	Images
Sunninghill	St Michael and All Angels Church	1887–89	Grade II	Crossland designed the memorial chapel to Thomas Holloway (whose funeral had taken place at the church) and also the rebuilding of the vestry and chancel.		

=== Greater Manchester ===
Location	Description	Dates	Listing	Notes	Refs	Images
Rochdale	St Chad's Church	1870–72	Grade II*	13th century and beyond; south aisle, porch and belfry by Crossland		

=== North Yorkshire ===
Location	Description	Dates	Listing	Notes	Refs	Images
Hawnby	All Saints' Church	1863	Grade II*	This was Crossland's first known church restoration.		
Kellington	Church of St Edmund King and Martyr	12th century, restored by Crossland; 1867–69	Grade I	Crossland's renovations included demolishing and rebuilding the north aisle and the south and east chancel walls and enlarging the chancel.		
Middlesmoor	Church of St Chad	1865–66, replacing a 14th-century church	Grade II	Sheila Binns quotes a contemporary account in The Ecclesiologist as saying that in basing his design on that of the 14th-century church Crossland treated it "with much dignity".		
Sutton-in-Craven	Church of St Thomas	1868–69	Grade II	This was a new church building. It memorialises Thomas Bairstow, a local benefactor. The tower was designed to carry a spire that was never added.		Church of St Thomas, Sutton-in-Craven

=== South Yorkshire ===
Location	Description	Dates	Listing	Notes	Refs	Images
Hoylandswaine, near Penistone	Church of St John the Evangelist	1867–68	Grade II	Binns describes it as a "small but substantial church, built to a high-quality of local stone for a small working class village".		
Sheffield	Church of St Mark, Broomhill	1868–71	Grade II	The church building, except for the tower and porch, was destroyed in the Second World War. In 1973, Crossland's porch and tower, which had been incorporated in a new 1960s building designed by George Pace, were Grade II listed, a heritage designation later applied to the whole church.		Church of St Mark, Broomhill, Sheffield

=== West Yorkshire ===
Location	Description	Dates	Listing	Notes	Refs	Images
Almondbury	All Hallows Church	Dating from the 13th century, it was restored by Crossland 1872–76	Grade I	Much of the work was funded by local landowner Sir John Ramsden.		
Birstall	St Peter's Church	Founded c.1100 and rebuilt by Crossland 1863–70, except for the medieval tower	Grade II*	Historic England say that it "demonstrates well" Crossland's "preference for the Decorated style and taste for lavish decoration".		St Peter's Church, Birstall
Copley	St Stephen's Church	1861–65	Grade II*	This church building, commissioned by Edward Akroyd, is now redundant and is under the care of the Churches Conservation Trust.		St Stephen's Church, Copley
Elland	Church of St Mary	Built mainly in the 13th and 14th centuries and restored by Crossland 1865–66	Grade I	As a child, Crossland had been baptised in this church.		Church of St Mary, Elland
Far Headingley, Leeds	St Chad's Church	1864–68	Grade II*	Designed by Crossland and Edmund Beckett Denison (later 1st Baron Grimthorpe), the church was built on land given by the Beckett family of Kirkstall Grange who paid £10,000 towards it.		St Chad's Church, Far Headingley, Leeds
Flockton	Church of St James the Great	1866–67	Grade II	According to Binns, "the church was built largely due to the efforts and at the personal expense of the incumbent at the time, the Reverend Robert Jackson French".		
Huddersfield	1–11 Railway Street and 20–26 Westgate (former Ramsden Estate Office)	1868–74	Grade II	This was commissioned by Sir John Ramsden; the Ramsden family then owned much of Huddersfield.		
Huddersfield	Byram Buildings (now known as Byram Arcade) 10–18 Westgate	1875–81	Grade II	This was commissioned by Sir John Ramsden.		Byram Arcade in 2007
Huddersfield	Kirkgate Buildings	1877–85	Grade II	Commissioned by Sir John Ramsden, this was a speculative development of office space and shops, originally called Bulstrode Buildings.		
Huddersfield	Longley New Hall	1870–75	Grade II	This rebuilding of a property built in the 1860s was commissioned by Sir John Ramsden as a house for his family; it became a school in the 1920s. Crossland also drew up plans for alterations to Longley Old Hall, on a nearby site.		
Huddersfield	St Andrew's Church, Leeds Road	1869–70	Grade II	This church building was declared redundant in 1975. The Victorian Society included it on a list in 2017 of the top ten endangered Victorian or Edwardian buildings in England and Wales that have been neglected and are now at risk.		Former Church of St Andrew, Leeds Road
Bradley, Huddersfield	St Thomas's Church	1859–68	Grade II	One of Crossland's earliest commissions, the church building was declared redundant in 1975. Historic England say that the church "is notable for the vitality of detail typical of the decade" and "is carefully sited on sloping ground, with asymmetrical south tower and spire placed so as to maximise the effect of its silhouette".		
Huddersfield	Somerset Buildings	1881–83	Grade II	Historic England say that "its eclectic C19 Queen Anne styling displays a strong level of architectural flair, incorporating French and Flemish Renaissance influenced detailing to successful effect... it has strong group value with nearby listed buildings, a number of which were also designed by Crossland".		
Huddersfield	Waverley Chambers	1881–83	Grade II	Soon after this commercial building was built, it became a temperance hotel and later was used as offices.		
Ossett, Wakefield	Church of the Holy Trinity	1862–65	Grade II*	This was Crossland's first large church building.		Church of the Holy Trinity, Ossett, Wakefield
Staincliffe	Christ Church	1866–67	Grade II	Historic England describe the church building as "unfinished". Cuts to the budget meant that its exterior was not completed to Crossland's original designs.		Christ Church, Staincliffe

== Later life ==
Crossland's last entry in the RIBA's records was in 1894–95. There is no record of him undertaking any work after 1900, when he ceased to be architectural adviser to Royal Holloway.

== Personal and family life ==
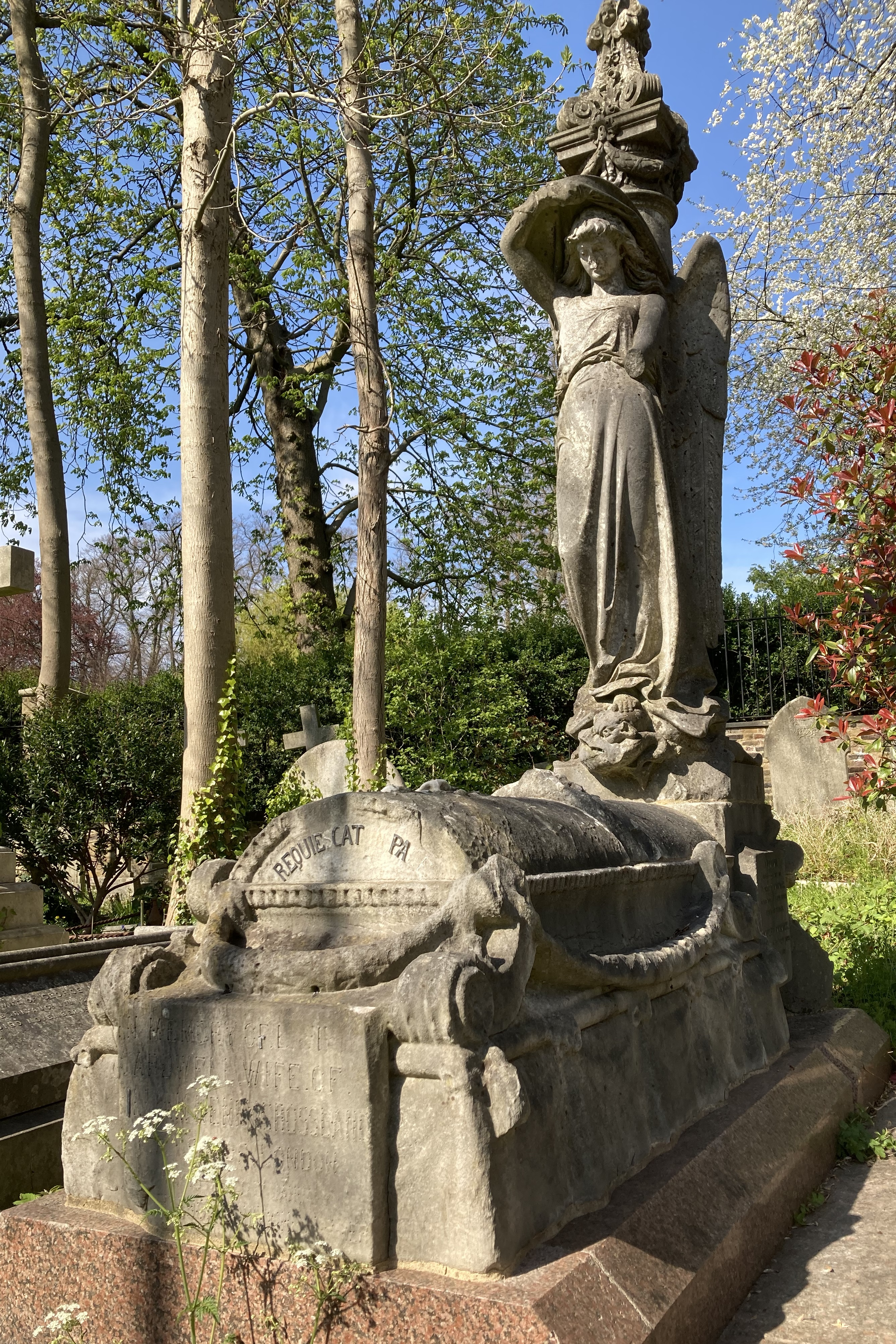
Family vault of William Henry Crossland in Highgate Cemetery (east side)

On 1 October 1859, Crossland married Lavinia Cardwell Pigot (who died in Boulogne, France on 17 January 1876). (Note: Although other sources claim that Crosswell's wife Lavinia died in 1879, Sheila Binns' research demonstrates that this date cannot be correct. The family plot in Highgate Cemetery (at Grave no. 23287, Square 70) was not bought until 1879 and Binns concludes that she must have been interred temporarily elsewhere. Binns, p. 159.) They had one child – a daughter, Maud, who was born on 10 July 1860 and died on 8 March 1900. Crossland also had an illegitimate son, Cecil Henry Crossland Hatt (born 1877), with his second (common-law) wife, (Eliza) Ruth Hatt (née Tilley; 1853–1892). She became a well-known actress, using the stage name Ruth Rutland, and they lived together in a bungalow on the Royal Holloway site, designed by Crossland and built in 1878 as a home for himself and his family while he oversaw Holloway College's construction.

Crossland died at 57 Albert Street, Camden, London on 14 November 1908 following a stroke. His wife Lavinia, his brother James Crossland, his common-law wife Eliza Ruth Hatt, (Note: Although there is no evidence that Crossland married Hatt, the inscription on her grave reads "Ruth, wife, companion, friend of W H Crossland...". Law, Part 3. Retrieved 18 February 2021.) his daughter Maud Lart, his parents-in-law and his stepson Benjamin Tilley Hatt are buried in a family vault at Highgate Cemetery. Although Crossland's will specifically stated that he and his son should be interred there, neither of them is in the family vault. Crossland's place of burial is unknown.

Crossland was survived by his son Cecil (by then known as Cecil Hatt Crossland) and two granddaughters – Maud and her husband William Lart's daughter Dorothea Maud (born 1881), and Cecil and his wife Lucy's daughter Beryl Joan (born 1905).

== Sources ==
- Binns, Sheila (2020). W.H. Crossland: An Architectural Biography. The Lutterworth Press. 258pp. ISBN 978 0 7188 9548 8.
- Law, Edward (1992). "William Henry Crossland, biography and works". Huddersfield & District History.
