= Ledge =

Ledge or Ledges may refer to:

- Ridge, a geological feature
- Reef, an underwater feature
- Stratum, a layer of rock
- Ledge, in civil engineering, a type of earthmoving cut
- Slang for legend or legendary
- Window ledge
- Ledges (album)
- Ledges State Park

== See also ==
- The Ledge (disambiguation)
