= Rochdale Town Hall =

Municipal building in Greater Manchester, England

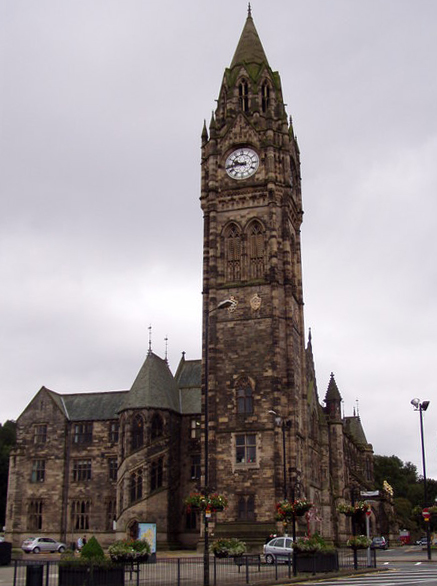
- The Town Hall, in 2008

- Location within Greater Manchester
- Former names: Rochdale Town Hall and Police G.V. I Station

General information
- Type: Town hall
- Architectural style: Victorian, Gothic Revival
- Location: Rochdale; Greater Manchester; England, The Esplanade; ROCHDALE; OL16 1AZ
- Coordinates: 53.6156°N 2.1594°W
- Current tenants: Rochdale Metropolitan Borough Council
- Construction started: 31 March 1866
- Inaugurated: 27 September 1871
- Destroyed: 10 April 1883 (tower)
- Cost: £160,000 (£16,290,000)
- Owner: Rochdale Metropolitan Borough Council

Height
- Height: 190 feet (58 m)

Technical details
- Floor count: 3
- Floor area: 3,000 square yards (2,500 m^{2})

Design and construction
- Architects: William Henry Crossland, Alfred Waterhouse (clock tower only)
- Other designers: Rochdale Corporation
- Main contractor: W. A. Peters and Son
- Awards and prizes

Listed Building – Grade I
- Official name: Town Hall
- Designated: 24 October 1951
- Reference no.: 1084275

Rochdale Town Hall is a Victorian-era municipal building in Rochdale, Greater Manchester, England. It is "widely recognised as being one of the finest municipal buildings in the country", and is recorded in the National Heritage List for England as a designated Grade I listed building. The town hall functions as the ceremonial headquarters of Rochdale Metropolitan Borough Council and houses local government departments, including the borough's civil registration office.

Built in the Gothic Revival style at a cost of £160,000 (£16.3 million in 2025), it was inaugurated for the governance of the Municipal Borough of Rochdale on 27 September 1871. The architect, William Henry Crossland, was the winner of a competition held in 1864 to design a new town hall. It had a 240-foot (73 m) clock tower topped by a wooden spire with a gilded statue of Saint George and the Dragon, both of which were destroyed by fire on 10 April 1883, leaving the building without a spire for four years. A new 190-foot (58 m) stone clock tower and spire in the style of Manchester Town Hall was designed by Alfred Waterhouse, and erected in 1887.

Architectural historian Nikolaus Pevsner described the building as possessing a "rare picturesque beauty". Its stained-glass windows are credited as "the finest modern examples of their kind". It is suggested that the building came to the attention of Adolf Hitler, who was said to have admired it so much that he wished to ship the building, brick-by-brick, to Nazi Germany had the United Kingdom been defeated in the Second World War. However, there is little concrete evidence available to support this claim.

== History ==
Rochdale had developed into an increasingly large, populous, and prosperous urban mill town since the Industrial Revolution. Its newly built rail and canal network, and numerous factories, resulted in the town being "remarkable for many wealthy merchants". In January 1856, the electorate of the Rochdale constituency petitioned the Privy Council for the grant of a charter of incorporation under the Municipal Corporations Act 1835, to constitute the town as a municipal borough. This would give it limited political autonomy via an elected town council, comprising a mayor, aldermen, and councillors, to oversee local affairs. The petition was successful and the charter was granted in September 1856. The newly formed Rochdale Corporation—the local authority for the Municipal Borough of Rochdale—suggested plans to build a town hall in which to conduct its business in May 1858. The site of an abandoned 17th-century house known as the Wood was proposed. Six months later, in April 1860, Rochdale Corporation arranged to buy the site on the outskirts of the town centre for £4,730 (£514,000 in 2025). However, plans were shelved due to lengthy negotiations and increasing land prices. In January 1864, the scheme resumed with a new budget of £20,000 (£1,860,000 in 2025).

The wood and surrounding area were cleared, but it is unknown what became of the dispossessed; there was no legal requirement for the authorities to rehouse the former inhabitants. A design competition to find a "neat and elegant building" was held by the Rochdale Corporation, who offered the winning architect a prize of £100 (£11,000 in 2025), and a Maltese cross souvenir. From the 27 entries received, William Henry Crossland's was chosen. The Rochdale-born Radical and Liberal statesman John Bright laid the foundation stone on 31 March 1866. Construction was complete by 1871 although the cost had, by then, increased beyond expectations from the projected £40,000 to £160,000 (£16,290,000 in 2025).

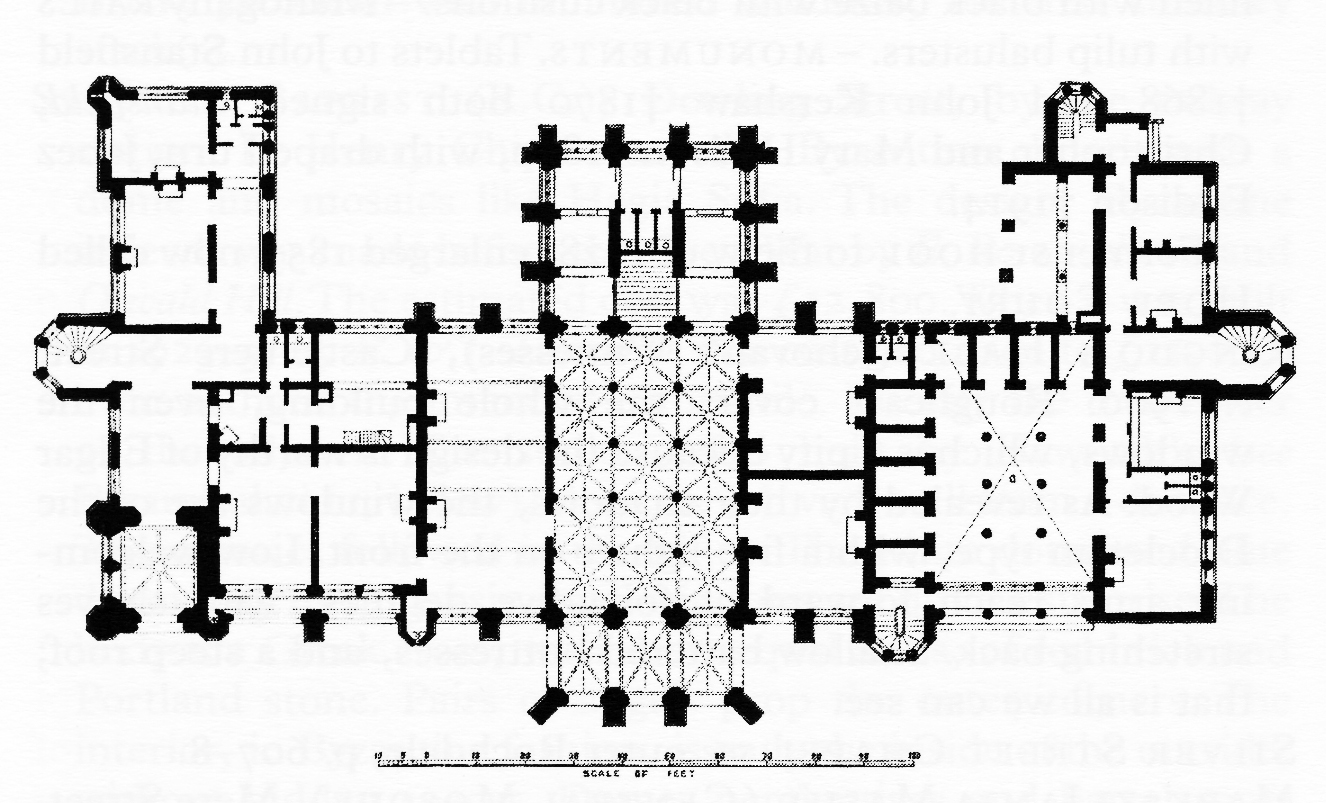
Plans for Rochdale Town Hall as published in The Builder in 1866

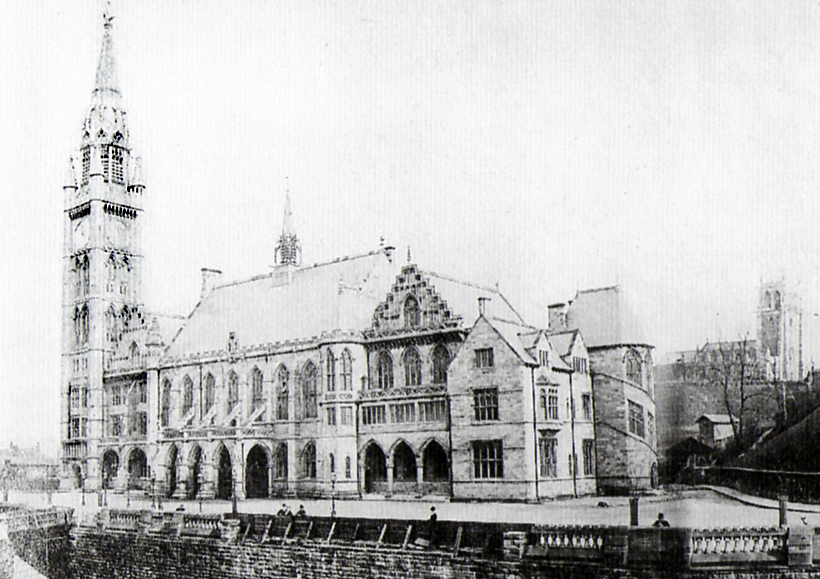
Rochdale Town Hall as it appeared in 1874, including its original 240-foot (73 m) clock tower with wooden spire

The town hall was one of several built in the textile towns of North West England following the Municipal Corporations Act 1835, but is one of only two in Greater Manchester built in the Gothic style. Between the setting of the foundation stone and the building's completion, revisions and additions were made to the original design. Money was "lavished" upon the décor and inventory, and the extra expenditure did not escape the ire of its critics. The cost of the building increased year-on-year through a combination of mismanagement, overspending and "unauthorised work". Public criticism of the high cost was aimed at Crossland and the Mayor of Rochdale, George Leach Ashworth, who oversaw the work. Nevertheless, Rochdale Town Hall was ultimately celebrated as "a source of pride", and its completion prompted celebration and rejoicing; it transformed a "derelict and marshy riverbank in to a huge romantic Gothic plaza". The opening ceremony on 27 September 1871 was performed by Mayor Ashworth, who had been instrumental in the changes made to the building's design.

In 1882 or 1883, dry rot was found in the 240-foot (73 m) high spire. On the recommendation of Rochdale's Borough Surveyor, contractors were engaged to rebuild it. The spire was to be demolished to clear the way for a replacement. It was rumoured that the workmen who were dismantling the top section of the wooden spire may have tried to speed up the dismantling process with matches and, at 9:20 am on 10 April 1883, a blaze was discovered. Despite the efforts of volunteers and the local fire brigade, 100 minutes after the discovery of the fire the entire spire, including a statue of Saint George and the Dragon, had been destroyed. The cause of the fire was never established, but Rochdale's fire service was criticised for taking longer to respond to the blaze than Oldham's (based 5 miles (8 km) south), despite the Rochdale Fire Brigade being based in the Town Hall. Alfred Waterhouse was given the task of designing a 190-foot (58 m) stone replacement. His work on the clock tower, which was built between 1885 and 1887 about 15 yards (14 m) further to the east than the original, shows many similarities to Manchester Town Hall, which he also designed. The tower was opened in 1887; an inscribed plaque commemorates the fire of 1883.

On 15 January 1931, at the height of the Great Depression, the Territorial Army was called to guard the town hall during a protest against unemployment and hunger.

In May 1938, Rochdale-born actress, singer and comedian Gracie Fields was granted Honorary Freedom of the Borough for her contribution to entertainment. "When the ceremony was over, Gracie went onto the town hall balcony to receive the cheers and good wishes of the thousands of people who were packing the streets below."

Although it is not fully understood how it came to his attention, Rochdale Town Hall was admired by Adolf Hitler. It has been suggested that military intelligence on Rochdale, or information from Nazi sympathiser William Joyce (who had lived in Oldham), brought the building to his attention. Hitler admired the architecture so much that it is believed he wished to ship the building, brick-by-brick, to Nazi Germany had German-occupied Europe encompassed the United Kingdom. Rochdale was broadly avoided by German bombers during the Second World War.

The town hall closed in 2020 and conservation work began in 2021 and lasted until 2024. Alongside repairs, lifts were installed to improve access and new roof insulation was installed along with heat pumps to make it more energy efficient. The project won a Europa Nostra Award in 2026.

== Features ==
=== Location ===
At OS Grid Reference SD895132 (53.6156°, −2.1594°), Rochdale Town Hall is the centerpiece of Rochdale, located in Town Hall Square to the south of The Esplanade and the River Roch. The Parish Church of St Chad is situated by the wooded hillside behind the Town Hall. In Town Hall Square, opposite the town hall, is a statue of John Bright, dated 1891, and the Rochdale War Memorial. Bright was a Rochdale-born orator, pacifist and Member of Parliament for Birmingham known for his campaigns to repeal the Corn Laws as well as his opposition to slavery in the United States and the Crimean War. Touchstones Rochdale art gallery and local studies centre is across The Esplanade.

=== Exterior and layout ===
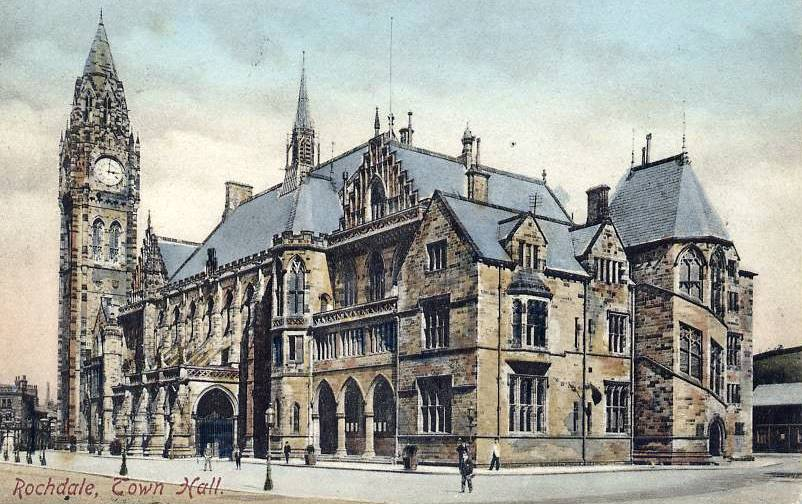
Rochdale Town Hall in 1909

The frontage and principal entrance of the Town Hall face the River Roch, and comprises a portico of three arches intersected by buttresses. Decorating the main entrance are stone crockets, gargoyles, and finials. Four gilded lions above a parapet around three sides of the portico bear shields carrying the coats of arms of Rochdale Council and the hundred of Salford.

Rochdale Town Hall is 264 feet (80 m) wide, 123 feet (37 m) deep, and is faced with millstone grit quarried from Blackstone Edge and Todmorden. Although now blackened by industrial pollution, the building has been described as a "rich example of domestic Gothic architecture". Naturalistic carved foliage on the exterior recalls the style of Southwell Minster, and the architecture is influenced by Perpendicular Period and medieval town halls of continental Europe. The building has been likened to Manchester Town Hall, Manchester Assize Courts, the Royal Courts of Justice, and St Pancras railway station, all products of the Gothic Revival architectural movement. The stained glass windows, some of which were designed by William Morris, have been described as "the finest modern examples of their kind". At each end of the frontage is an octagonal staircase.

In the words of Nikolaus Pevsner, Rochdale Town Hall has "a splendidly craggy exterior of blackened stone". The building has a roughly symmetrical E-shaped plan, and is broken down into three self-contained segments: a central Great Hall and transverse wings at each end, which have variously been used as debating chambers, corporation-rooms, trade and a public hall. The south-east wing used to house the magistrates' courts, and the north-west wing the mayor's rooms. In the north-east is a tower. Access to the main entrance is through a central porte cochere. The façade extends across 14 bays, of which the Great Hall accounts for seven. On both sides, the outermost bays rise to three storeys. They flank asymmetric round-headed arcades—two to the left and three to the right, all of single-storey height—which sit below plain mullioned windows, balconies and ornately decorated gables.

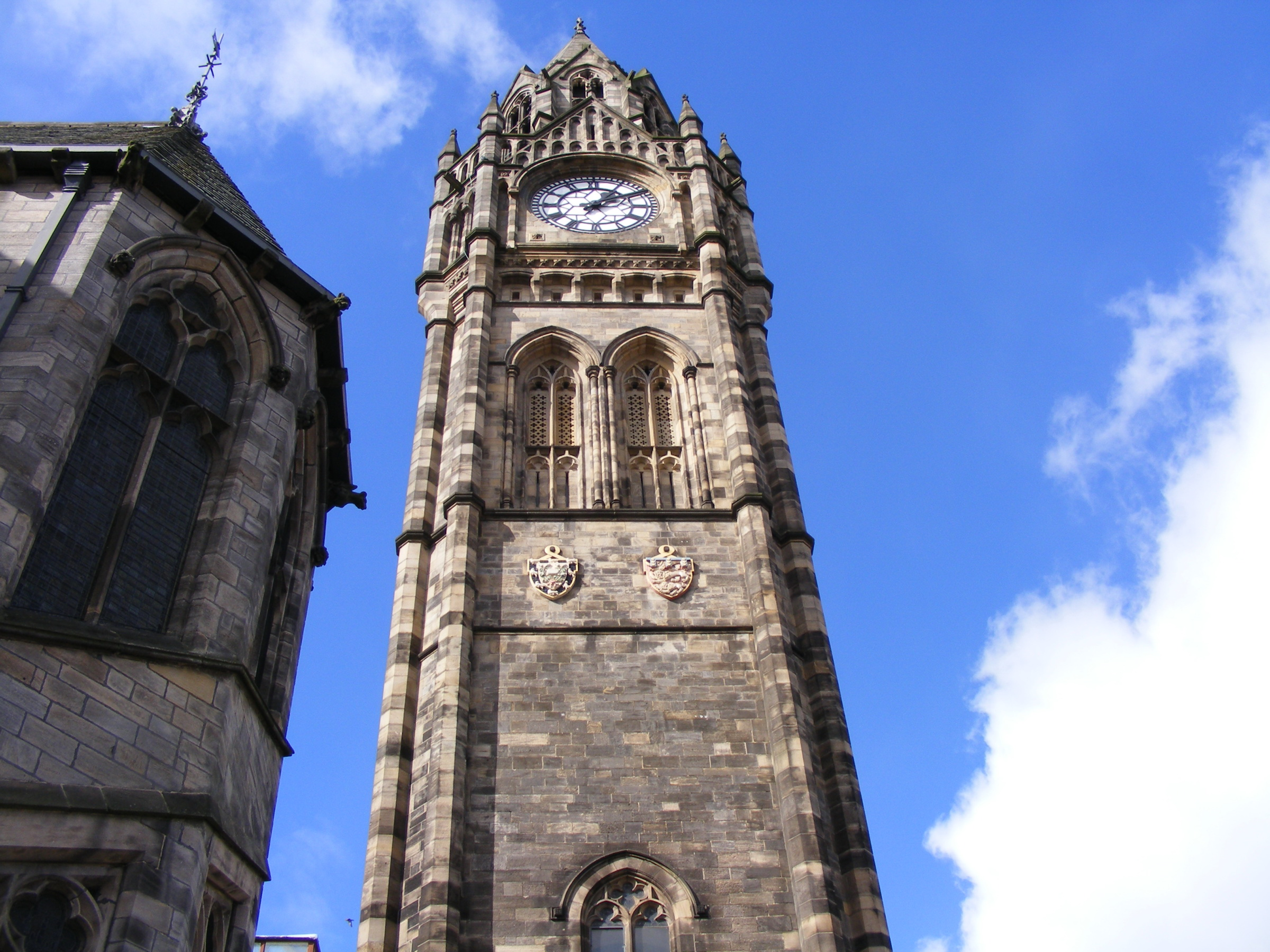
The clock tower was designed by Alfred Waterhouse, the architect of Manchester Town Hall.

=== Clock tower ===
The original clock tower contained 13 bells, by John Taylor & Co of Loughborough, together with a clock and carillon machine (by Gillett, Bland & Co.) which played 14 different tunes on the bells. These were all destroyed in the 1883 fire.

The present clock tower, which has a stone spire, was built to replace the one destroyed in the fire. It was designed by Alfred Waterhouse in a similar style to one of his earlier works, the clock tower of Manchester Town Hall. The first stone was laid by Thomas Schofield JP, Alderman and Rochdale Borough Councillor, on 19 October 1885 and the tower was declared complete on 20 June 1887, the Golden Jubilee of Queen Victoria. It was fitted with five bells (again by Taylor), which ring on the hour and at 15-minute intervals, and a Cambridge-chiming clock by Potts & Sons, which was set going in November of that year.

The tower rises from a plinth and has four stages including the gable-headed clock stage, which is also decorated with pinnacles. A small stone spire completes the composition. The design of the original tower was more elaborate and 50 feet (15 m) higher than its successor, which is 190 feet (58 m) tall.

=== Interior ===
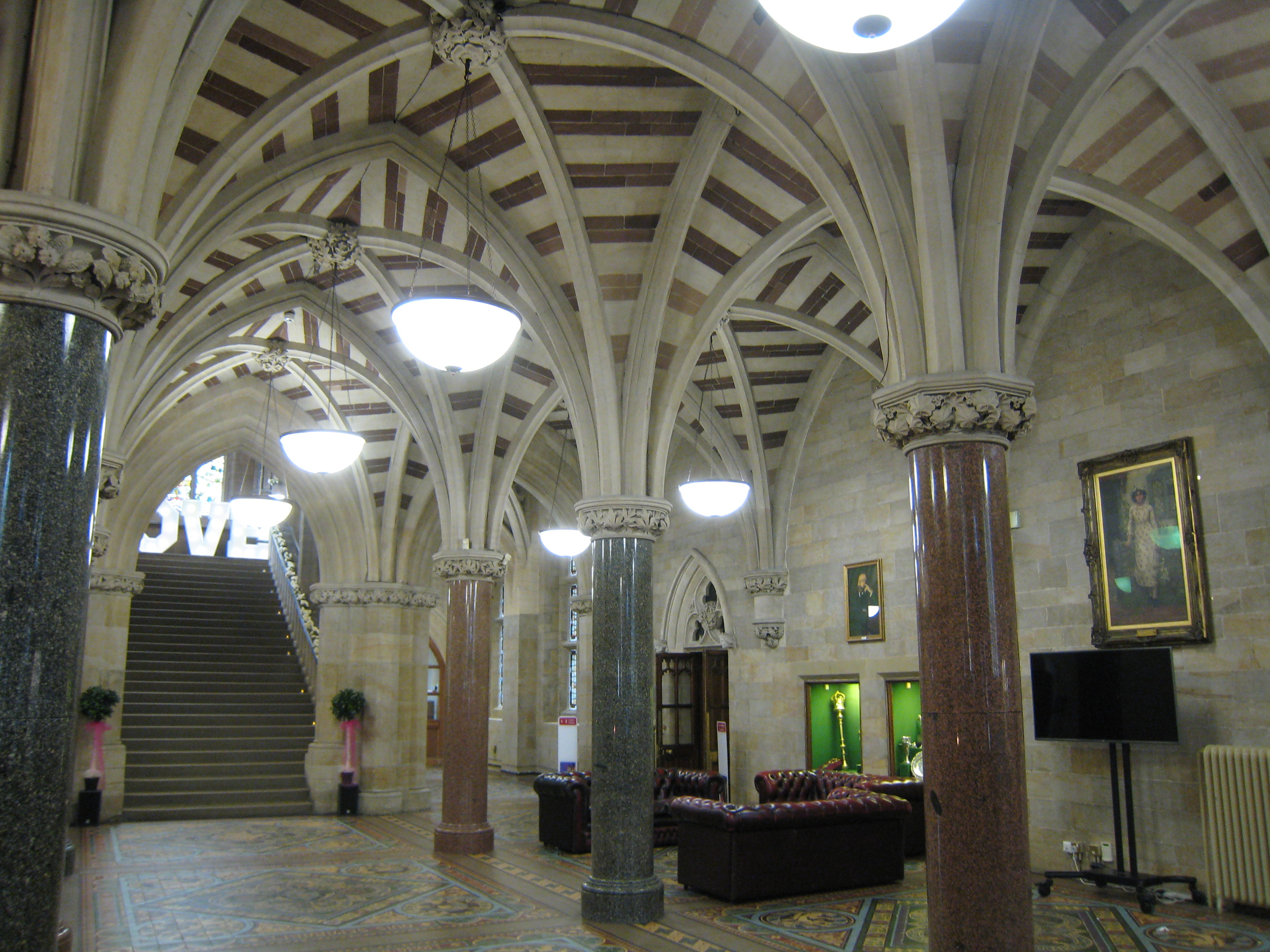
Entrance Hall

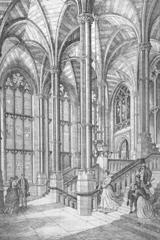
Etching of the Grand staircase by William Henry Crossland, 1871

Murals in the former council chamber depict the inventions that drove the Industrial Revolution, and the Great Hall is adorned with a large fresco of the signing of Magna Carta by artist Henry Holiday, although the painting is dirty. Responsibility for the decoration of the interior was given to Heaton, Butler and Bayne, who incorporated floor tiles that were manufactured by Mintons and decorated with the local insignia and the Royal coat of arms of the United Kingdom. The stone Grand Staircase, which leads from the vestibule to the Great Hall, is decorated with stained glass; such glass windows decorate most of the Town Hall and are considered to be the finest example of the work of Heaton, Butler and Bayne. The medieval style Great Hall, described by Pevsner as a room of "great splendour and simplicity", has a hammerbeam roof flanked by statues of angels, in a design that resembles Westminster Hall.

James Jepson Binns built the town hall's pipe organ in 1913; it was rebuilt in 1979 by J.W. Walker & Sons Ltd.

== Heritage status and function ==
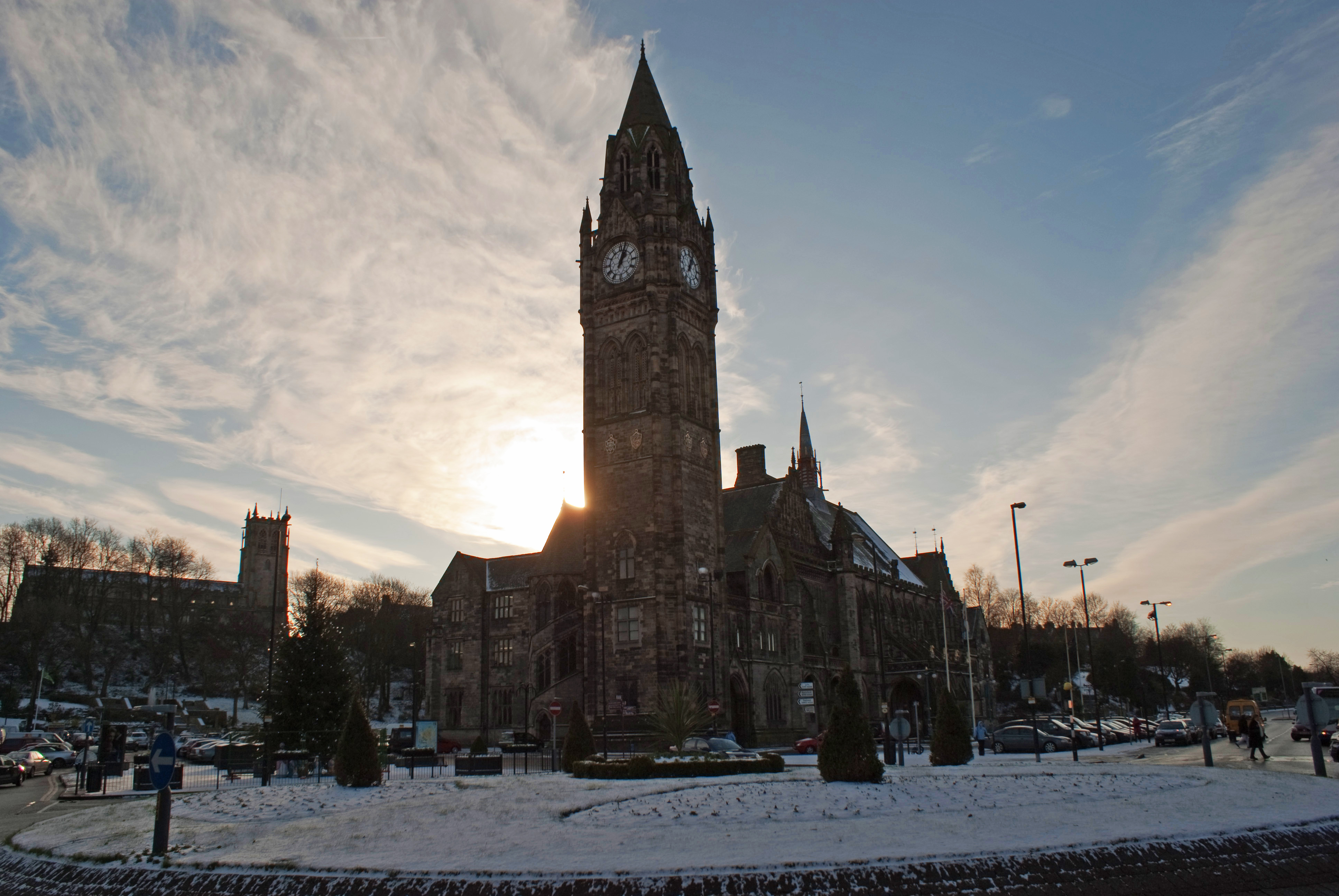
Rochdale Town Hall during the winter of 2009–2010

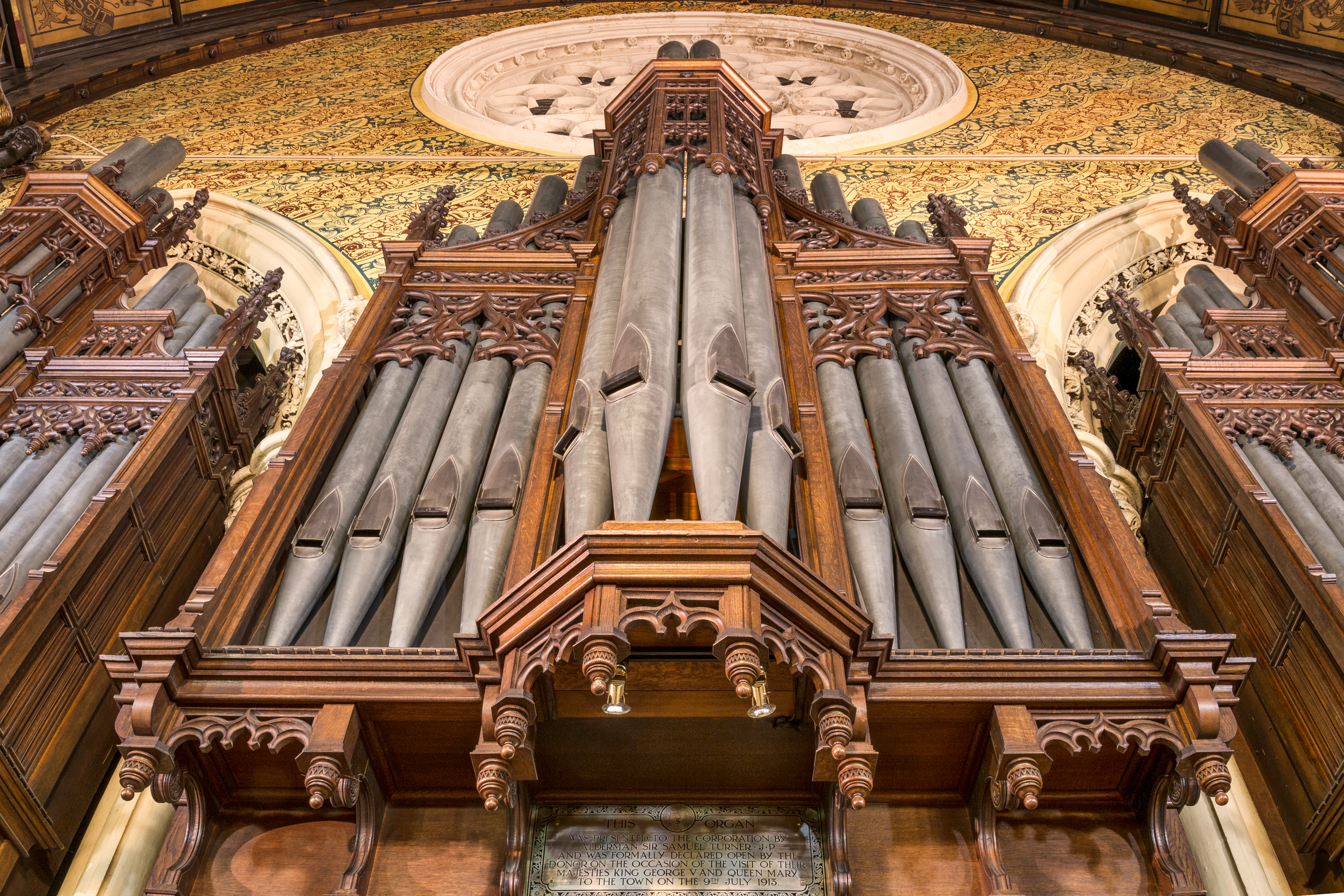
Rochdale Town Hall organ (1913)

The town hall was listed at Grade I on 25 October 1951. Such buildings are defined as being of "exceptional interest, sometimes considered to be internationally important". In February 2001, it was one of 39 Grade I listed buildings, and 3,701 listed buildings of all grades, in Greater Manchester. Within the Metropolitan Borough of Rochdale, it is one of only three Grade I listed buildings, and 312 listed buildings of all grades.

Although the majority of local government functions now take place within Number One Riverside, Rochdale Town Hall continues to be used for cultural and ceremonial functions. For instance, it is used for the Metropolitan Borough of Rochdale's mayoralty, civil registry, and for formal naturalisation in British Citizenship ceremonies.

== See also ==
- Grade I listed buildings in Greater Manchester
- Listed buildings in Rochdale
