= Lodging (disambiguation) =

Lodging may refer to:

- Lodging, a type of residential accommodation
- Lodging (agriculture), the bending over of the stems near the ground level in grain crops, which makes them very difficult to harvest
- "Lodging" (Widow's Bay), a 2026 TV episode

== See also ==
- Lodge (disambiguation)
