= Middlesmoor =

Village in North Yorkshire, England

Coordinates: 54.1629°N 1.8583°W

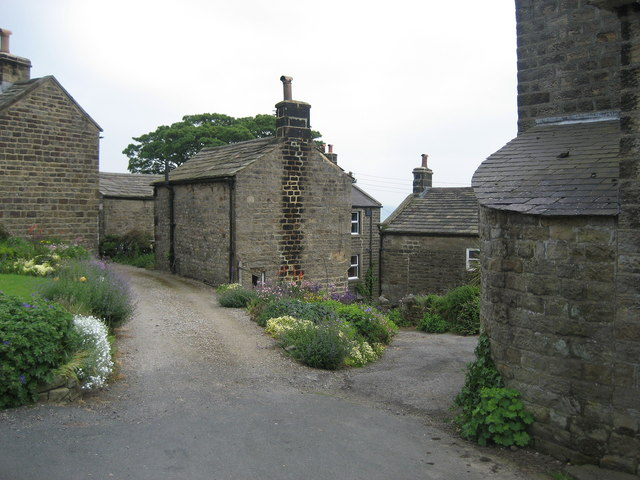
- Part of the village opposite the Crown Inn

- Location within North Yorkshire
- Population: 40
- OS grid reference: SE092741
- Civil parish: Stonebeck Up
- Unitary authority: North Yorkshire
- Ceremonial county: North Yorkshire
- Region: Yorkshire and the Humber
- Country: England
- Sovereign state: United Kingdom
- Post town: HARROGATE
- Postcode district: HG3
- Police: North Yorkshire
- Fire: North Yorkshire
- Ambulance: Yorkshire
- UK Parliament: Skipton and Ripon

Middlesmoor is a small hill village at the head of Nidderdale in the county of North Yorkshire, England.

Middlesmoor is the principal settlement in the civil parish of Stonebeck Up, historically a township in the ancient parish of Kirkby Malzeard. Until 1974 it was part of the West Riding of Yorkshire. From 1974 to 2023 it was part of the Borough of Harrogate. It is now administered by the unitary North Yorkshire Council.

== History ==
The place name was first mentioned in the 12th century. It probably means "moorland in the middle of two streams" referring to the River Nidd and its tributary How Stean Beck. An alternative explanation is that the name comes from an otherwise unrecorded personal name, Midele, also seen in the name of Middlesbrough.

In the 12th century Byland Abbey established a grange at Middlesmoor.

== Church ==
It appears that there has been a place of worship at Middlesmoor since Anglo-Saxon times. There is a stone cross inscribed "Cross of St Ceadda" (Chad), dated to Anglo-Saxon times, in the Church of St Chad, which also contains an ancient font which is possibly Anglo-Saxon.

The present church was built in 1865 by William Henry Crossland. It is a Grade II listed building. The church occupies a commanding position overlooking upper Nidderdale.

== See also ==
- Listed buildings in Stonebeck Up
