= Hunting Lodge Farm =

- U.S. National Register of Historic Places
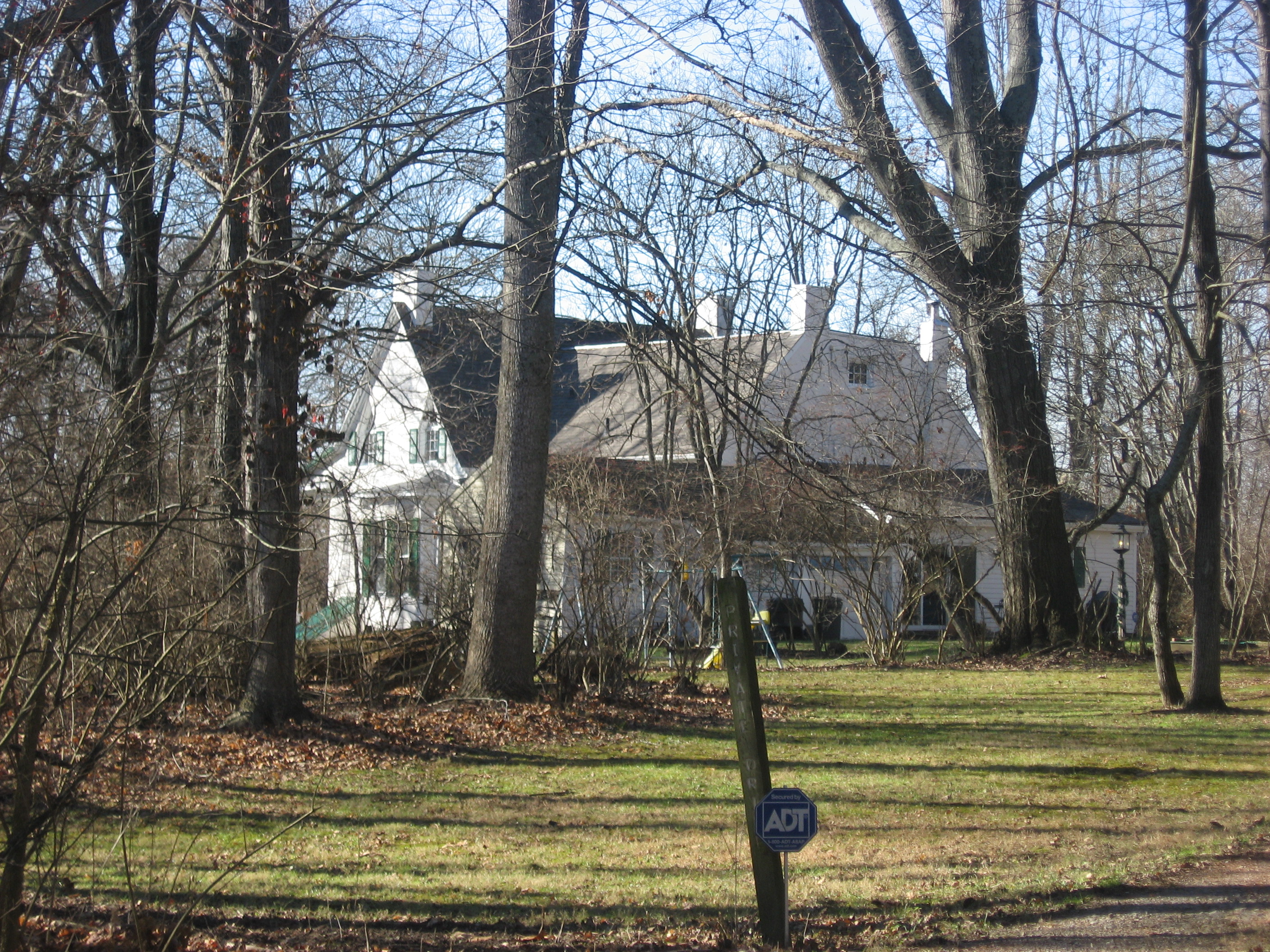
- Roadside view

- Location within Ohio Location within the United States
- Location: 5349 Coulter Ln.
- Nearest city: Oxford, Ohio
- Coordinates: 39°31′15″N 84°43′20″W
- Area: 3.7 acres (1.5 ha)
- Built: 1833
- Architectural style: Greek Revival
- NRHP reference No.: 82001361
- Added to NRHP: October 20, 1982

Hunting Lodge Farm is a historic house located near Oxford in Oxford Township, Butler County, Ohio, United States. Constructed as a hunting lodge, it has been used by multiple prominent local residents, and its distinctive architecture has made it worthy of designation as a historic site.

Built of brick and set upon a stone foundation, Hunting Lodge Farm is covered with a gabled asphalt roof. The building has been deemed an example of the Gothic Revival style of architecture, due largely to a few triangular windows that derive from traditional construction styles employed in the construction of hunting lodges in Bavaria. Overall, its architecture is more typical of the Greek Revival style, due to elements such as a symmetrical front facade, Tuscan columns on the front porch, and a trabeated side porch. The second story features components such as dormer windows, transoms, and an ornate cornice with dentils.

Built in 1833, the house was used as a hunting lodge for only a few years; it has been a residence since 1840. Although located atop a hill above Four Mile Creek, the house occupies a comparatively obscure location; its driveway is crooked, and it is surrounded by woodland. Both the inside and the outside of the house remain well maintained with comparatively few changes from 1840. The earliest owners, Henry Orne and Isaac Gere, are responsible for the house's overall plan and its unique elements, even though it was home from 1872 until 1895 to Lazarus Noble Bonham, a prominent journalist, educator, and Ohio Secretary of Agriculture.

In late 1982, the Hunting Lodge Farm was listed on the National Register of Historic Places, qualifying both because of its historic architecture and because of its connection to numerous important individuals. It is one of four National Register-listed locations in Oxford Township, along with the Austin-Magie Farm and Mill District, the Zachariah Price Dewitt Cabin, and the Pugh's Mill Covered Bridge.
