= St Chad's Church, Rochdale =

Church in Greater Manchester, England

Rochdale Parish Church
- St Chad's Church, Rochdale
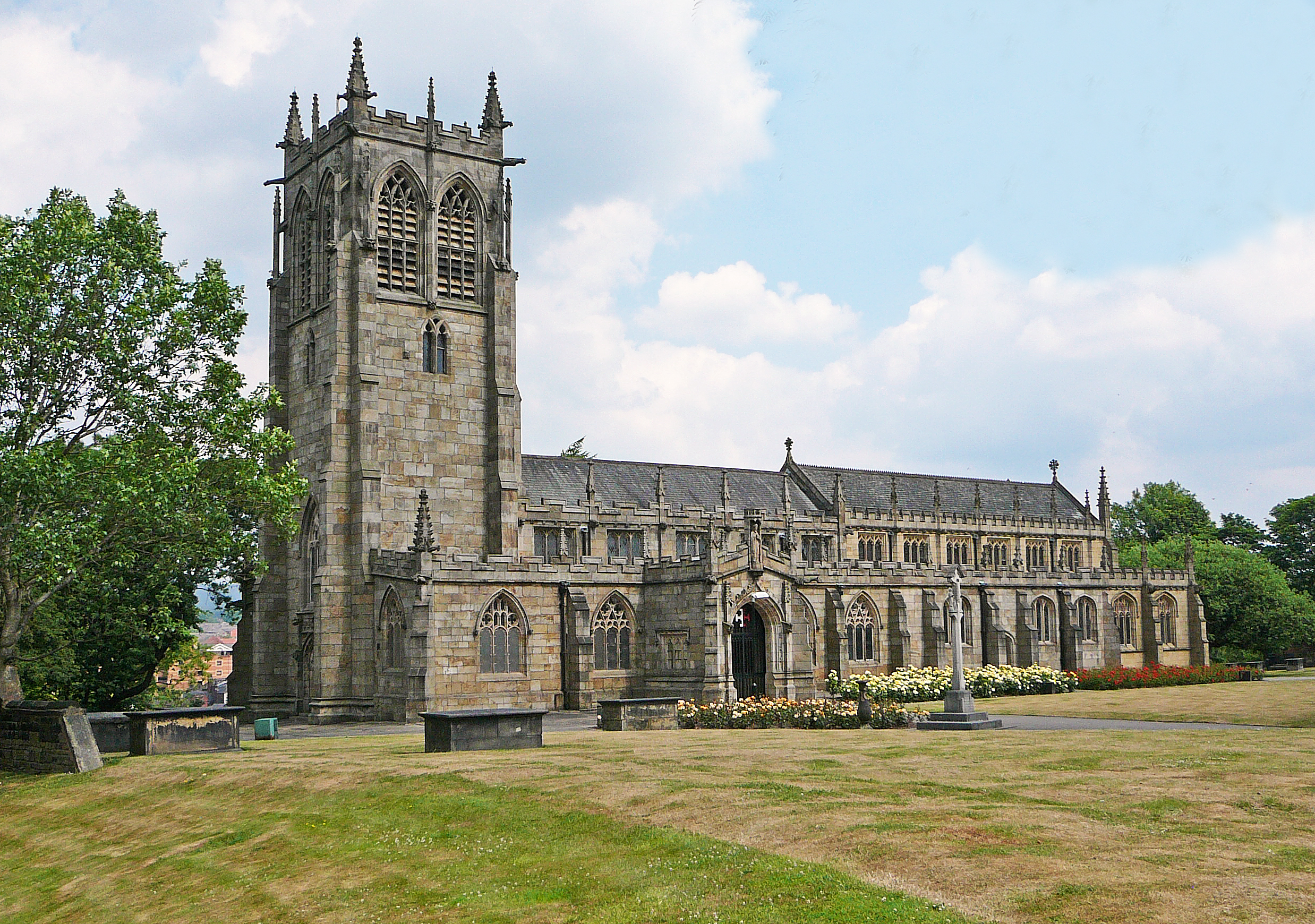
- St Chad's Church, Rochdale

- Location within Greater Manchester
- 53.614479°N 2.157836°W
- OS grid reference: SD 89666 13145
- Location: Rochdale, Greater Manchester
- Country: England
- Denomination: Church of England
- Website: www.rochdaleparishchurches.org.uk

History
- Status: Active
- Founded: 601
- Dedication: St Chad

Architecture
- Functional status: Parish Church
- Style: Gothic Revival
- Completed: 1100

Administration
- Province: York
- Diocese: Manchester
- Parish: Rochdale

Clergy
- Vicar: Revd Anne Gilbert

St Chad's Church is the Church of England parish church of Rochdale in Greater Manchester, England. It forms part of the Diocese of Manchester. It is an active place of worship and community hub for the town and outlying suburbs around the town. It is a grade II* listed building and sits at a high elevation above both Rochdale Town Hall and the town centre.

== History ==
St Chad's was the mother church of the ancient parish of Rochdale and was founded before 1170, possibly on an Anglo-Saxon site. Much of the current building is the result of late Victorian restoration. A local legend relates that the site was chosen by spirits and fairies as on several occasions stone for the church building was moved from near the river to the hill on which St. Chad's stands. The church is accessed from the town below by a flight of 124 steps. The town stocks (no longer in use) are in the churchyard.

St Chad's Church is a medieval foundation; however this is not apparent from its outside aspect. The advowson of the church was granted to the Cistercian community at Stanlow Abbey by Roger de Lacy (1170-1211). The arcades (13th century) have some round and some octagonal piers and variations in ornamentation, while the tower arch is of the 14th century. In the 1850s, there was a restoration by Joseph Clarke; a rebuilding and lengthening of the chancel which included arcades with narrow bays was the work of J. S. Crowther in 1883–85. In the 1850s, the north aisle was rebuilt; in the 1870s the south aisle was rebuilt and the height of the tower increased by the addition of a large and ornate bell-stage. In the Dearden chapel is a monument to John Dearden, rector in the 14th century; in this chapel are also a number of brasses to members of the Dearden family which are however forgeries made for James Dearden c. 1847. The monument to Jacob Dearden (died 1825) is by R. W. Sievier. The most notable monument is the signed work of William Coleburne of London; it commemorates James Holte of Castleton (d. 1712) and Dorothea his wife (d. 1718) and is made of grey and white marble.

== Notable graves ==
- John Collier (1708–1786), caricaturist and satirical poet

== See also ==
- Listed buildings in Rochdale
- List of churches in Greater Manchester
