= Stonebeck Up =

Civil parish in North Yorkshire, England

Coordinates: 54°10′N 1°55′W

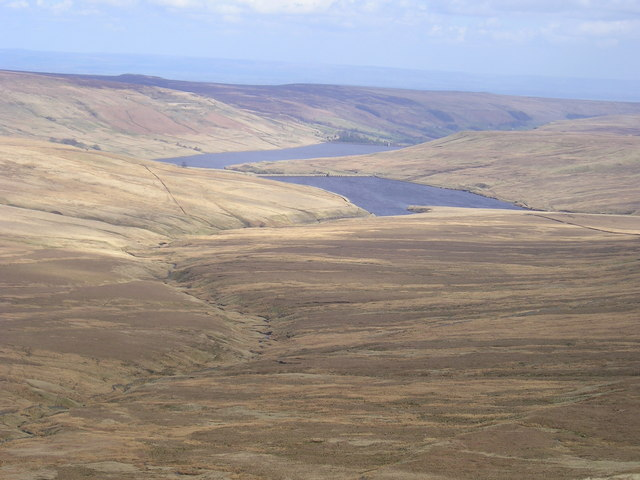
- View across the parish area with Angram and Scar House reservoirs

- Location within North Yorkshire
- Population: 119 (2011 census)
- Civil parish: Stonebeck Up
- Unitary authority: North Yorkshire
- Ceremonial county: North Yorkshire
- Region: Yorkshire and the Humber
- Country: England
- Sovereign state: United Kingdom
- Police: North Yorkshire
- Fire: North Yorkshire
- Ambulance: Yorkshire

Stonebeck Up is a civil parish in the county of North Yorkshire, England. The only village in the parish is Middlesmoor. The population of the parish in the 2011 census was 119.

The parish occupies the highest part of Nidderdale. It is bounded on the south side by Stean Beck, from which the parish takes its name (stean being a dialect form of "stone"), and which separates it from the parish of Stonebeck Down. To the west and north it is bounded by a ridge, including the summits of Great Whernside and Little Whernside, and to the east it is bounded by Masham Moor, a ditch known as Mere Dike, and the River Nidd. The parish includes Angram and Scar House Reservoirs, and large areas of grouse moor.

Historically Stonebeck Up was a township in the ancient parish of Kirkby Malzeard in the West Riding of Yorkshire. In the Middle Ages it formed part of the lands of Byland Abbey, which established granges at Middlesmoor, Newhouses, Woodale, Lodge, Angram, Haden Carr and Scar House. The granges survived as farming communities into the twentieth century. Angram and Haden Carr were submerged by the reservoirs, and Lodge was abandoned when Scar House Reservoir was constructed in the 1920s.

Stonebeck Up became a separate civil parish in 1866, and was transferred from the West Riding to North Yorkshire in 1974. The parish now shares the Upper Nidderdale grouped parish council with the parishes of Stonebeck Down and Fountains Earth.

From 1974 to 2023 it was part of the Borough of Harrogate. It is now administered by the unitary North Yorkshire Council.

== See also ==
- Listed buildings in Stonebeck Up
