= Hunting Lodge Mass Grave =

Hunting Lodge Mass Grave may refer to:

- Hunting Lodge Mass Grave (Knezdol)
- Hunting Lodge Mass Grave (Sušak)
