= West End Preparatory School, Harrogate =

West End School

Location
- 4, The Oval; Harrogate, North Yorkshire; England
- Coordinates: 53.984421°N 1.540967°W

Information
- Type: Preparatory School
- Closed: 31 Aug 1999
- Principal: AMB Wayman
- Staff: 10 (1956-1961)
- Age: 4 to 11
- Enrolment: 50
- Houses: Austen and Bronte
- Colours: blue and green

West End Prep School was a fee paying private preparatory school and situated at No 4 The Oval, Harrogate

During the late 1950s the headmistress was Mrs Dorothy Gray. She was assisted by her daughter Mrs Wayman, Mr Harold Styan, Miss Twistleton, Mrs Embleton, Mrs Spence, Mrs Salisbury, Mrs E Cummins (French), Mrs Winifred Brittain (Deputy Head/Senior Mistress), Miss Veronica Robson (Physical Education, and dance/calisthenics for girls), Mrs M Major, Mrs E Baxter, Mrs Bowman (nature study) Mrs Ashfield, maths; and Miss E Leithead. Miss Kathleen Moulding was the visiting piano teacher.

Mr Styan, who also taught at Norwood College and Grosvenor House School, was an ex-army PE instructor, organiser of several Boys' Clubs in the Harrogate area, and an expert using Indian clubs.

The school had limited grounds, being just a sizeable private house, although there was a sand pit behind the building. Football and Games often took place in the Oval, Rounders on the Stray which was a short walk across Otley Road.

West End School closed on 31 Aug 1999 at No 4 The Oval and was sold. West End School continued but was wound up as a going concern in 2003.

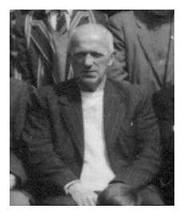
Mr Styan MBE
