= Clifton House School =

Defunct English private school for boys

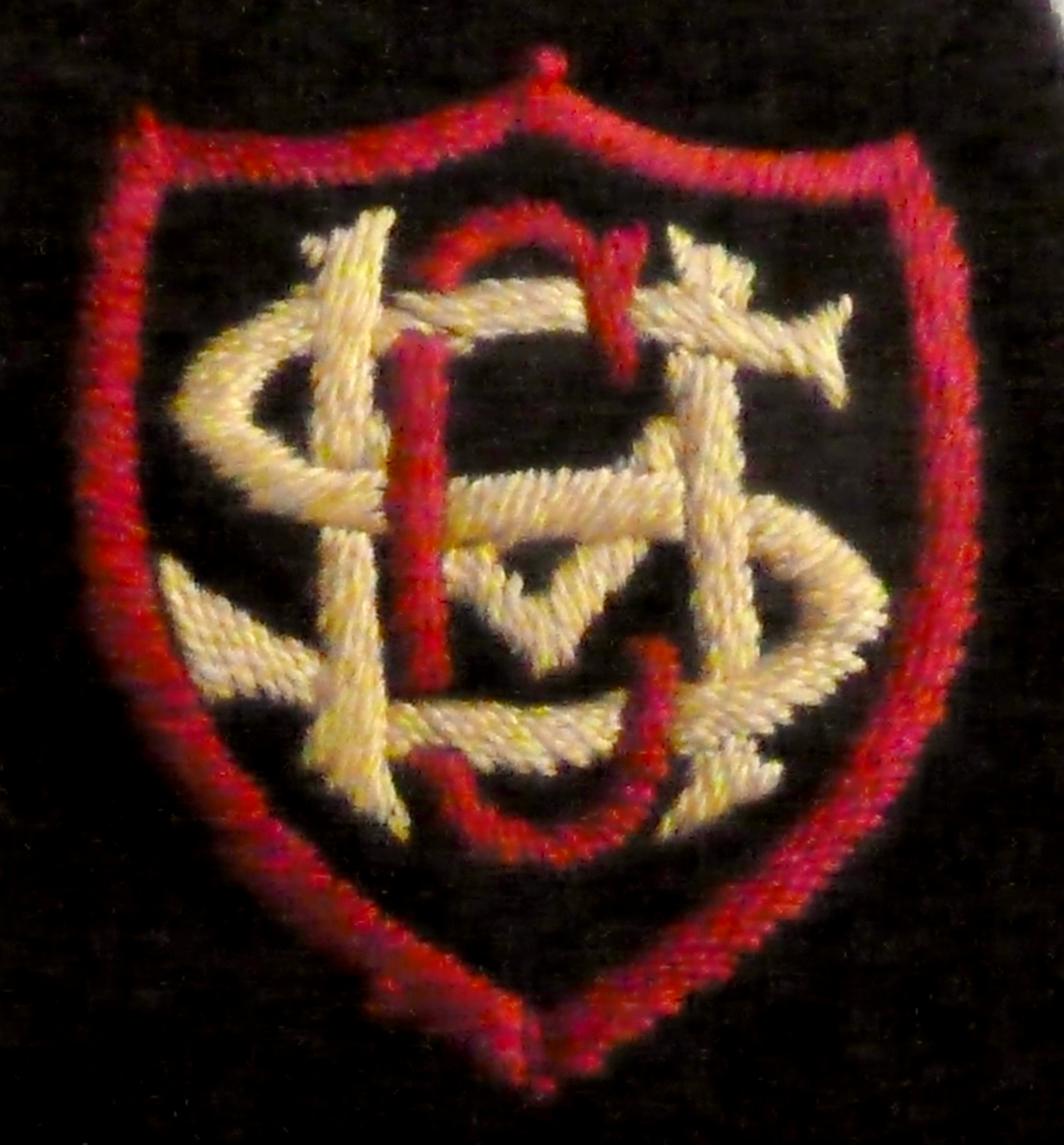

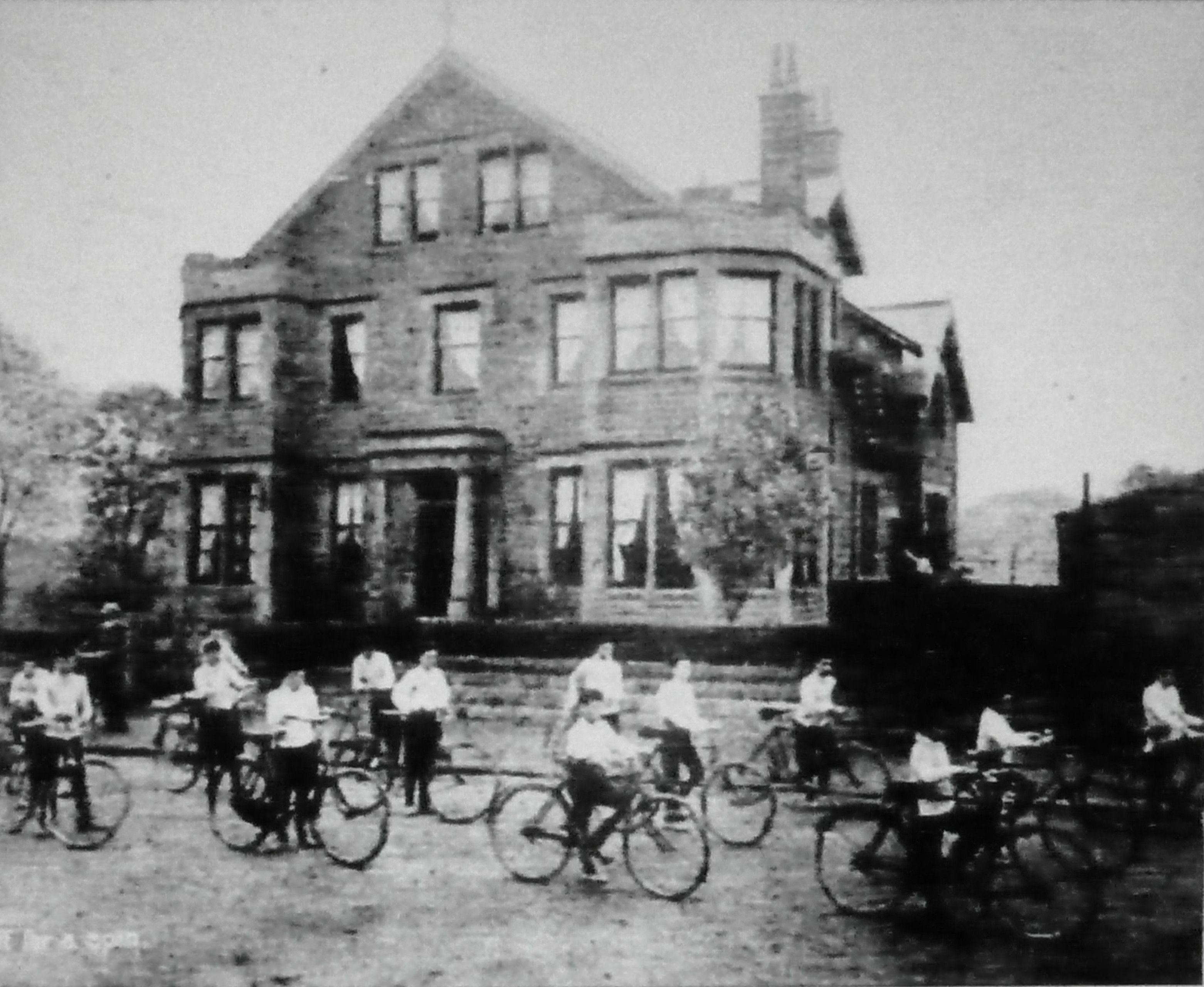
- Clifton House School in 1910
- Harrogate, North Riding of Yorkshire; England

Information
- Former name: Clifton College (later known as Clifton House Preparatory School)
- Type: Private school; preparatory school; boarding school
- Motto: Esse quam videri (To be, rather than to seem)
- Religious affiliation: Anglican
- Established: 1898
- Founder: James Walter Nuttall
- Closed: 1968
- Head teacher: J. W. Nuttall; Mr Burgess; W. H. Colton; Mr Sanderson; J. Ford
- Gender: boys' school
- Age range: 5–14 years
- Enrollment: Up to 100+
- Colors: Red, yellow and black
- Publication: Aquila; Cliftonian Lookout

Clifton House School was a private boys' preparatory school which operated in Harrogate, North Riding of Yorkshire, England, between 1898 and 1968. It was founded in Clifton House in Queens Parade, thus acquiring the name of Clifton College, then Clifton House School. It kept that name until its last years when it became Clifton House Preparatory School. In 1909 the school established the first scout pack in Harrogate.

The school had some notable staff and pupils; Harold Styan was its sports teacher for some years, while its alumni include jewellery historian Jack Ogden and Major General Michael Walsh. In its heyday the school was in a prime position, facing Harrogate's Stray; its place is now taken by a block of flats.

== History ==
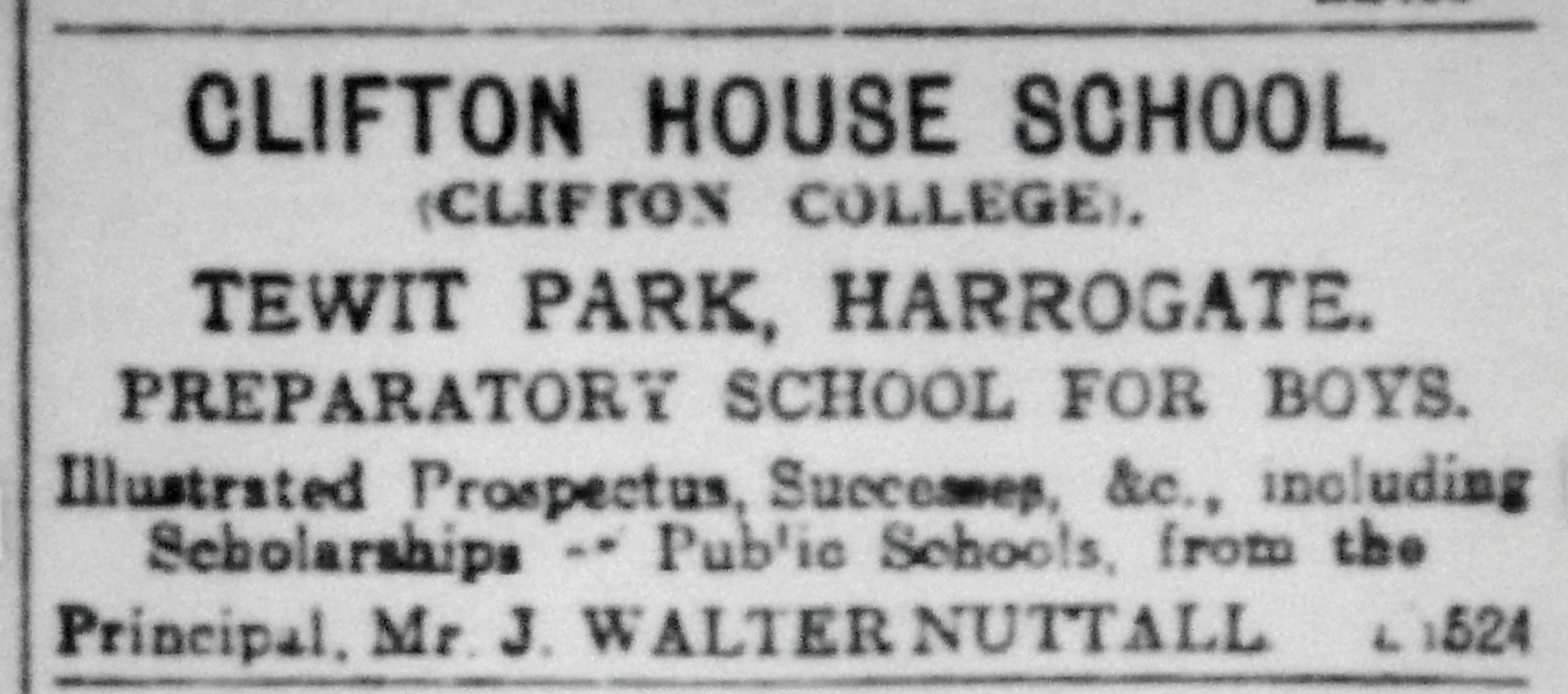
1914 small ad for Clifton House School

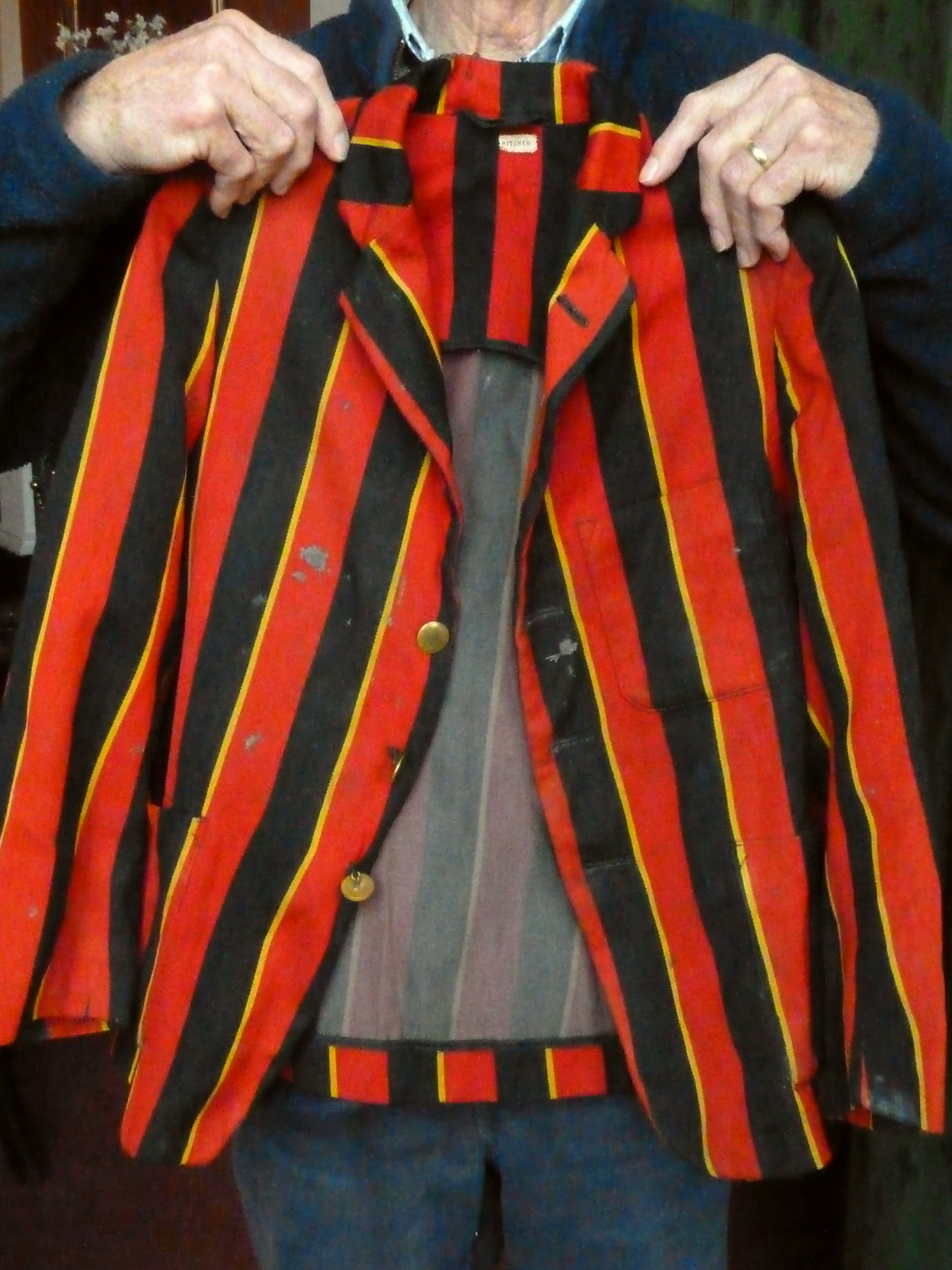
Summer blazer

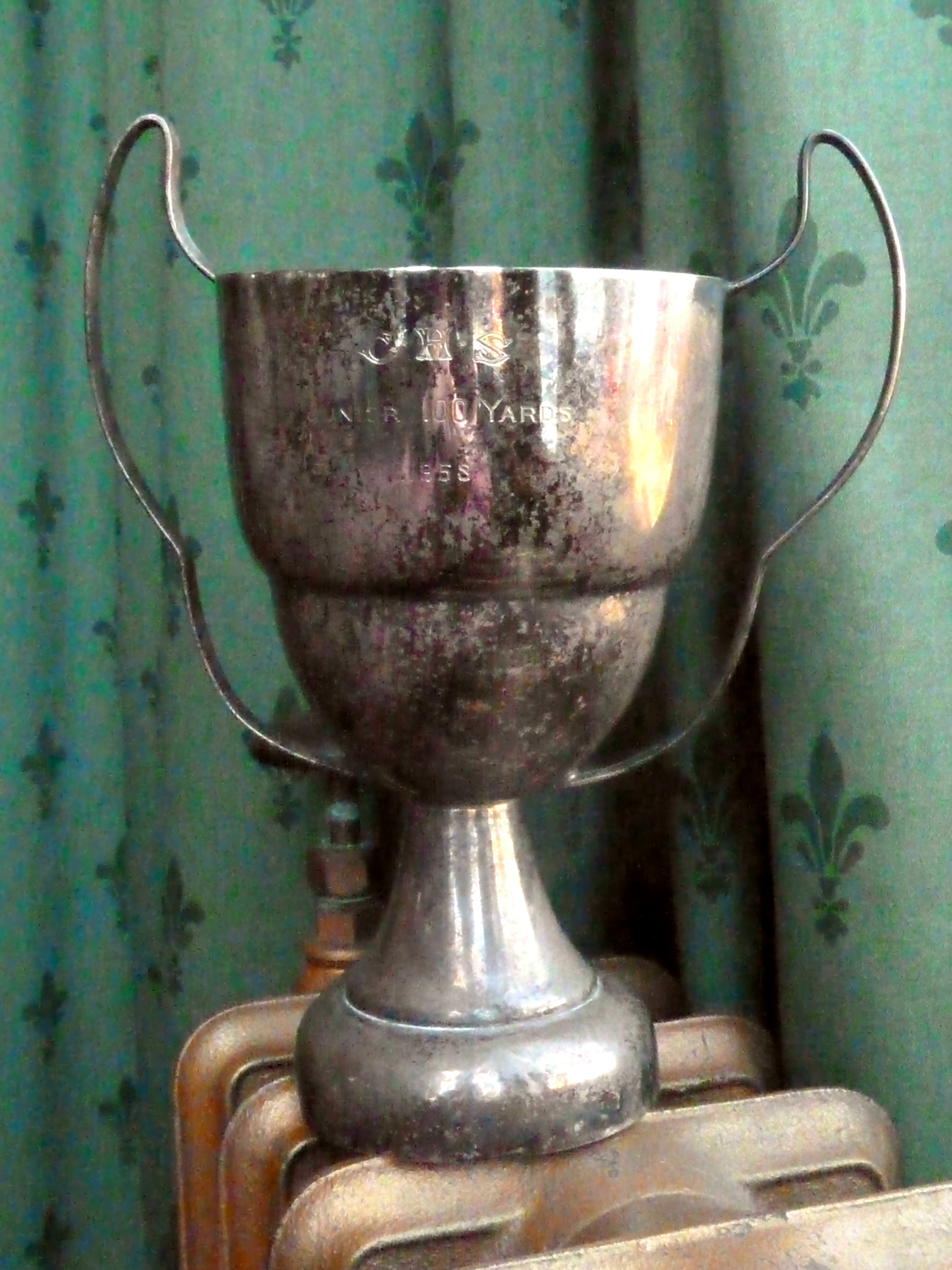
Victor ludorum cup

Clifton House School was founded by James Walter Nuttall in 1898, initially with three pupils, the sons of Reverend C.N. Wright of Kirby Hill, Boroughbridge. It was located at Clifton House, 6 Queen Parade, Harrogate, which had previously been used by Alfred Lord Tennyson when visiting Harrogate. In 1898 the school was at first called Clifton College, (Note: The name "Clifton College" was probably changed to "Clifton House School" to avoid confusion with Clifton College in Bristol (founded 1862), because both schools were on the cricket tournament list.) then for many years it was Clifton House School. In its latter years it was known as Clifton House Preparatory School. According to historian Malcolm Neesam, In 1900, while still at Queen Parade, the school's pupils included "Indian and Colonial boys", i.e. "boys of families in Indian and Colonial service".

From 1903, and still headed by Nuttall, the school was relocated at the first of two properties built by developer Isaac Pickard in Stray Road in the same town. This was a purpose-built school. In 1910 the school moved to a larger premises in the same road, and remained there until 1968. The school magazine was named Aquila, then Cliftonian Lookout. In 1899 the school's advertisement declared a healthy situation, a "resident foreign master", and preparation for examinations. The school took part in inter-school cricket tournaments. The school motto was: Esse quam videri (to be, rather than to seem). In the 1950s the school uniform comprised grey shorts, grey or white shirt, and a red, yellow, and black blazer, tie, and cap, although a few years later the blazer was red, gold and green.

The school closed in 1968, and its building on Stray Road was demolished in 1970. In 1969 the school's former sports field was leased to Harrogate Cricket Club, for the use of its junior section. In 1989 there was an old boys' reunion, and future reunions were planned.

=== 10th Harrogate Clifton House Scout Pack ===
In 1909 the 10th Harrogate Clifton House Scout Pack was formed at the school. On 9 July 1921 Lord Baden Powell, in the presence of division commissioner of the Girl Guides, Laura Veale, presented the pack with Peter's Pole. The pack received the honour because, according to Malcolm Neesam, it had "won the award of best pack in the United Kingdom [having gained] most marks for efficiency". In 1945 the scoutmaster was Mr A. Hill. That year, the scouts had attended a summer camp at Arnside, and the next planned summer camp was to be held in North Wales.

The scout pack continued to exist after 1968 when Clifton House School closed. In 1978 the scout pack transferred to St Wilfrid's Church, where in due course the 90-year anniversary of its 1909 foundation was celebrated. It was attended by Clifton House School old boy and former 10th Harrogate scout Michael Walsh, who was by that time Chief Scout (retired).

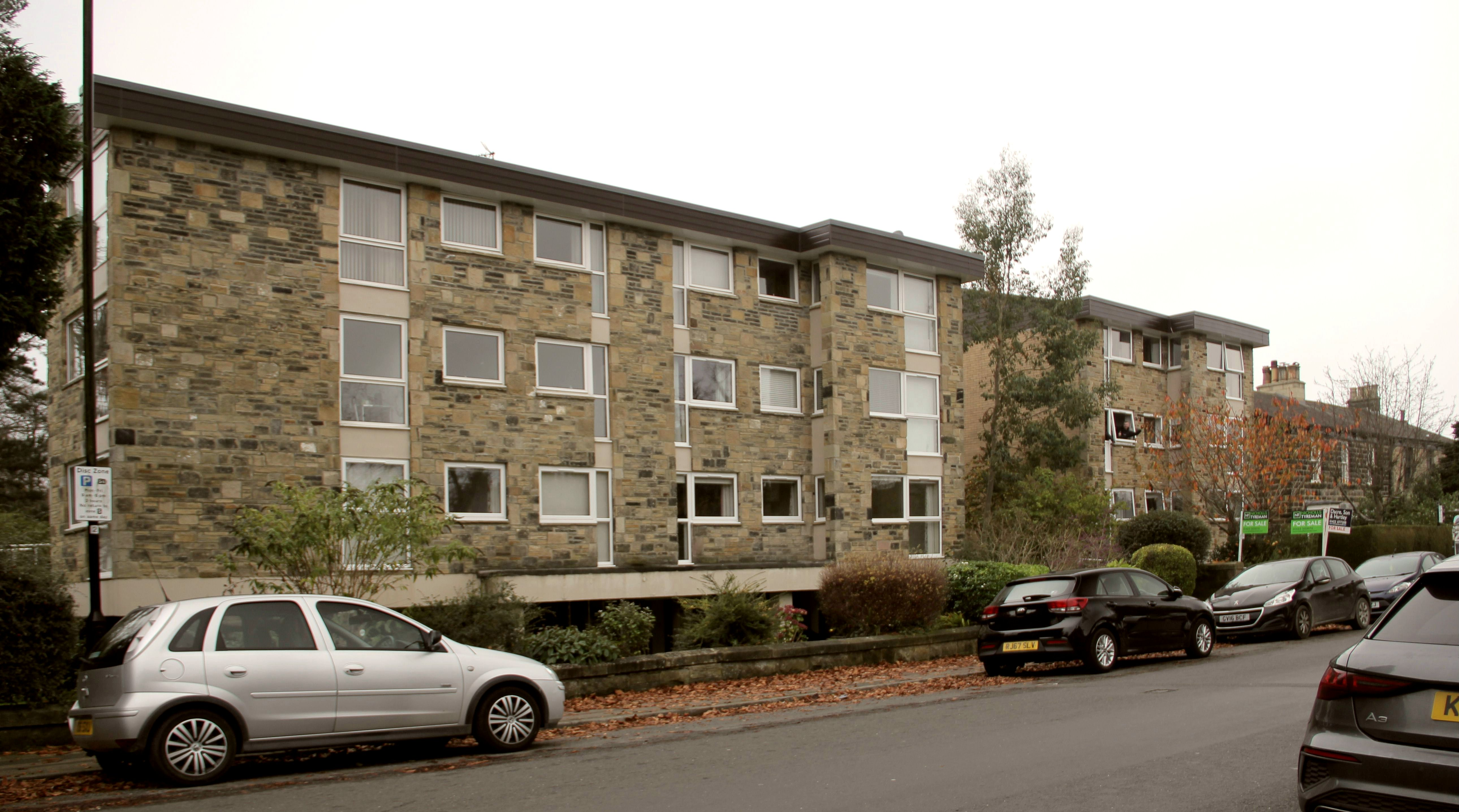
Clifton House flats, Queen Parade, where the school first stood

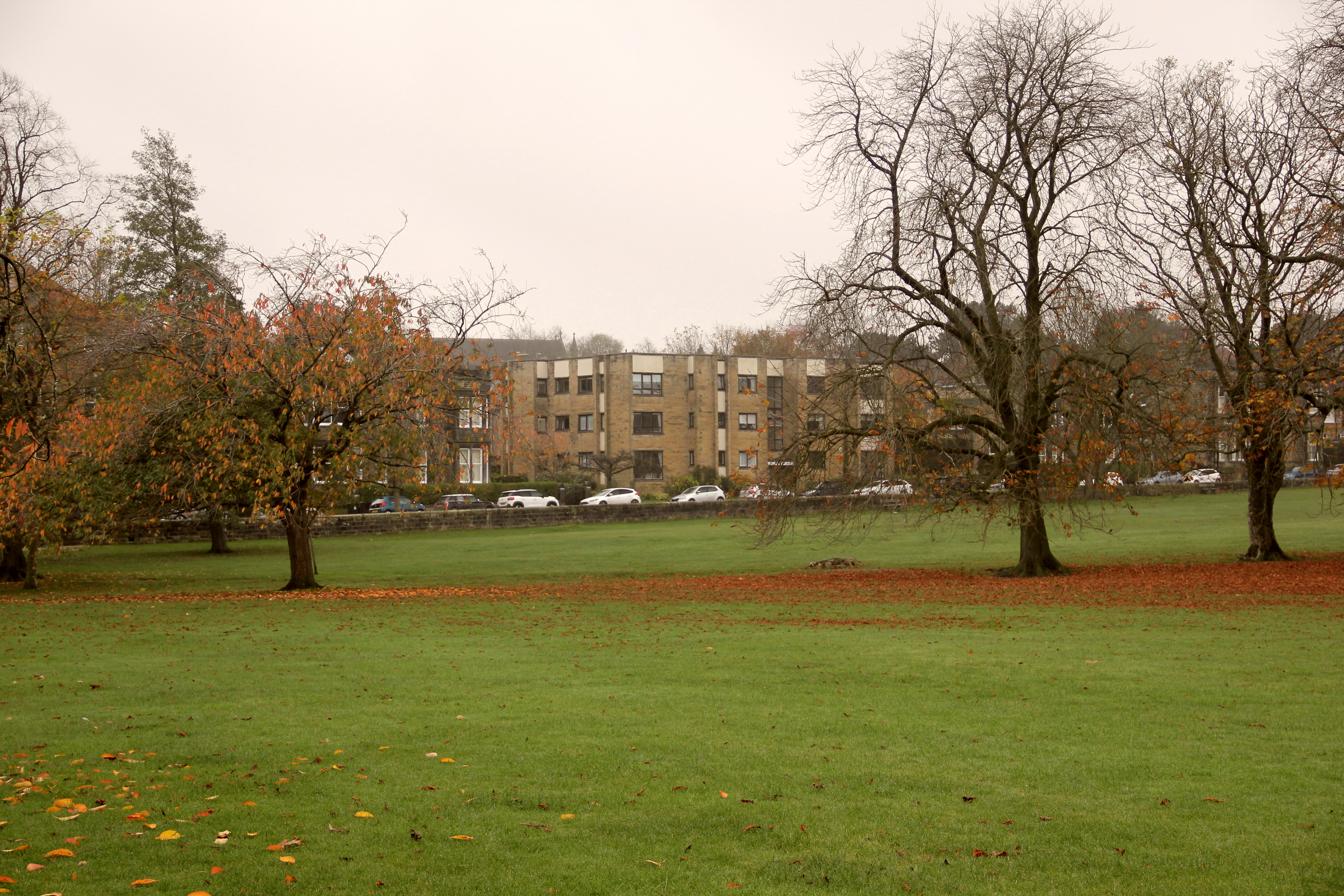
Flats on Stray Road, where the school once stood

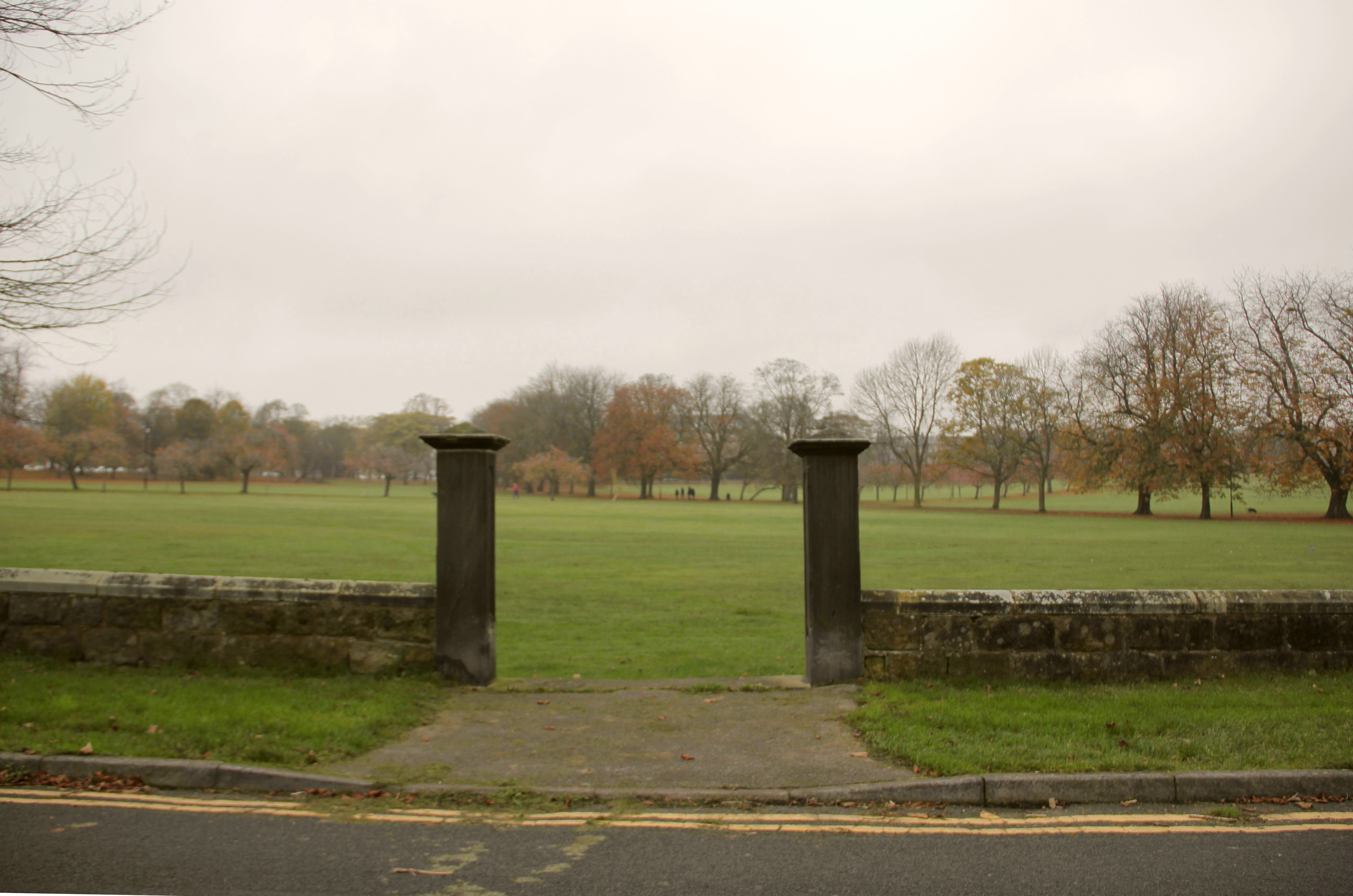
View of The Stray from where the school once stood

== First World War ==
At the school during 1914 and 1915, two young pupils Norman Clay and Geoffrey Alfred James Clay wrote letters home. War-related selections from the letters are copied here verbatim:

The artillery are coming soon because we saw some soldiers measuring the length of the stray I do not know why they should do that I hope it is for firing it would be lovely to see them firing the guns, we will have every thing here when the Artillery comes ... There is about 20 old boys joined us to go to the front. We have just seen an old boy in his uniform he did look nice ... We have just been out to see such a lot of Soldiers some were Cavalry and some were Infantry the Cavalry were Yorkshire Hussars and some were Dragoons they each had a band they did sound lovely ... Mr Scott came last Monday night and in the morning he showed us a GERMAN HELMET it is such a funny thing all the helmets in the German army have had the spikes taken off Mr Scott said that it was because they wanted them to make into ammunition because they were getting short and because to that they could seen quite easily ... Lots of the boys have soldiers and we have fights in the gym I wish we had that big gun of ours it would blow the enemie's lines to pieces.

=== Clifton House Old Boys War Memorial ===
The school possessed a war memorial plaque dedicated to fifteen or sixteen of its former pupils who had died in service as a result of the First World War. After the school closed, the plaque was renovated by the Rev. St John Turner, vicar of St Mark's Church, Harrogate, who acquired a faculty from the Ripon diocese to hang the plaque in the church. The plaque was re-dedicated there on 12 June 1988, and former pupils of the school were invited to the dedication service. This event prompted further old boys' reunions from 1988 onwards. As of 2024, the plaque was missing.

== Staff ==
A list of staff was given at Anthony Eden's 2007 website on the subject of Norwood School. The site has been archived.

=== James Walter Nuttall ===
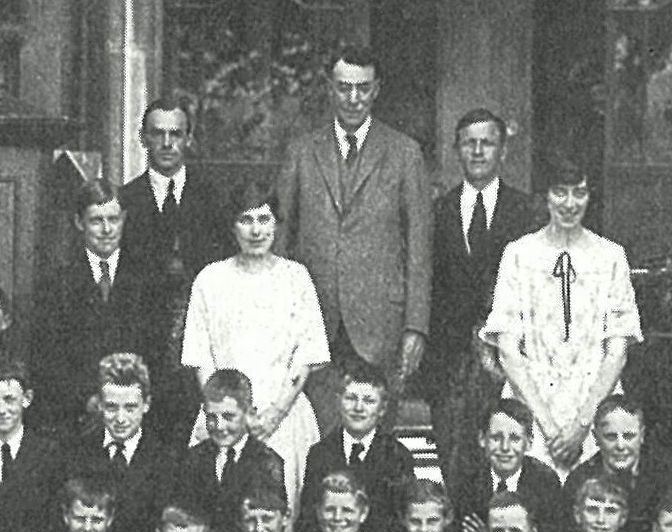
Nuttall, relatives and pupils (1924)

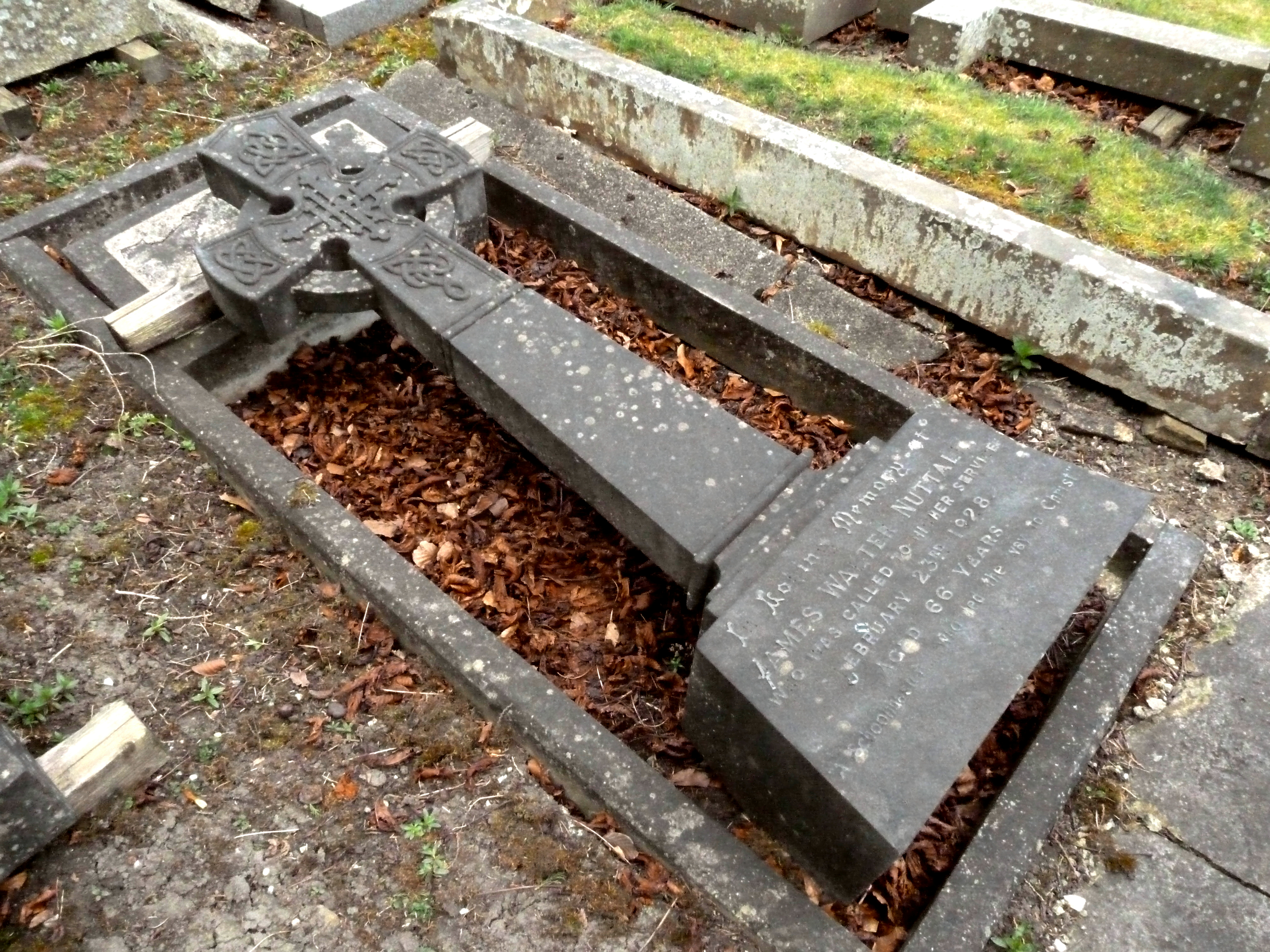
Nuttall's grave

James Walter Nuttall was the son of the registrar of births and deaths Daniel Nuttall of Spotland, Rochdale, Greater Manchester, (Note: James Walter Nuttall (Rochdale 19 November 1861 – 23 February 1928). GRO index: Births Dec 1861 Nuttall James Walter Rochdale 8e 35. Marriages Mar 1890 Nuttall James Walter and Sutton Maria Anne, Carlisle 10b 702. Deaths Mar 1928 Nuttall James W. 66 Knaresbro' 9a 146.) who had at least seven children. At age 19 in 1881, Nuttall was a boarder at a Westminster training college. By 1891 Nuttall was married and back in Spotland as a certified schoolmaster, with his wife and a 12-year-old servant. By 1896 he was the principal of a "flourishing school" in Morecambe, according to the Methodist Times.

Nuttall's school was established in Clifton House at 6 Queens Parade in 1898 and named Clifton House School, though known as Clifton College at first. As founding owner, headmaster and acting housemaster, James Walter Nuttall lived there, from 1898 with his wife, children, and his father in law William Sutton, a retired Inland Revenue employee and Methodist preacher. Sutton continued to preach, but died in 1899 at the school. The 1901 census finds Nuttall still living at the school in Queen Parade. Nuttall was still headmaster of the school in 1903 or 1906 when it was moved from 6 Queen Parade, Harrogate to Stray Road. One of his children was Violet Nuttall, who at age 19 in 1911 was an assistant mistress at the school. (Note: Violet Marie S. Nuttall (20 October 1891 – 1971). GRO index: Births Mar 1892 Nuttall Violet Marie S. Rochdale 8e 35. Marriages Jun 1929 Nuttall Violet M. S. and Challenor Basil M. Knaresbro' 9a 214. Deaths Sep 1971 Challenor Violet Marie S. 20 Oct 1891 Wokingham 6a 571.) Nuttall retired as headmaster around 1924, He died in 1928, leaving £742 (equivalent to £40,302.28 in 2025). He was buried at Harlow Hill Cemetery, and his monument is a carved Celtic cross.

=== Charlie Cass ===
One of the teachers at the school beginning in 1923 was Gordon William George "Charlie" Cass. (Note: Gordon William George Cass (Scarborough 16 April 1898 – Harrogate 13 October 1976). GRO index: Births Jun 1898 Cass Gordon William G. Scarbro' 9d 402. Deaths Dec 1976 Cass Gordon William G. 16 AP 1898 Claro 2 2110.) A veteran of the First World War, he had served in the Royal Air Force or Royal Flying Corps. Cass left Clifton School in 1936 to found, and become headmaster of, Norwood College.

=== Harold Styan ===
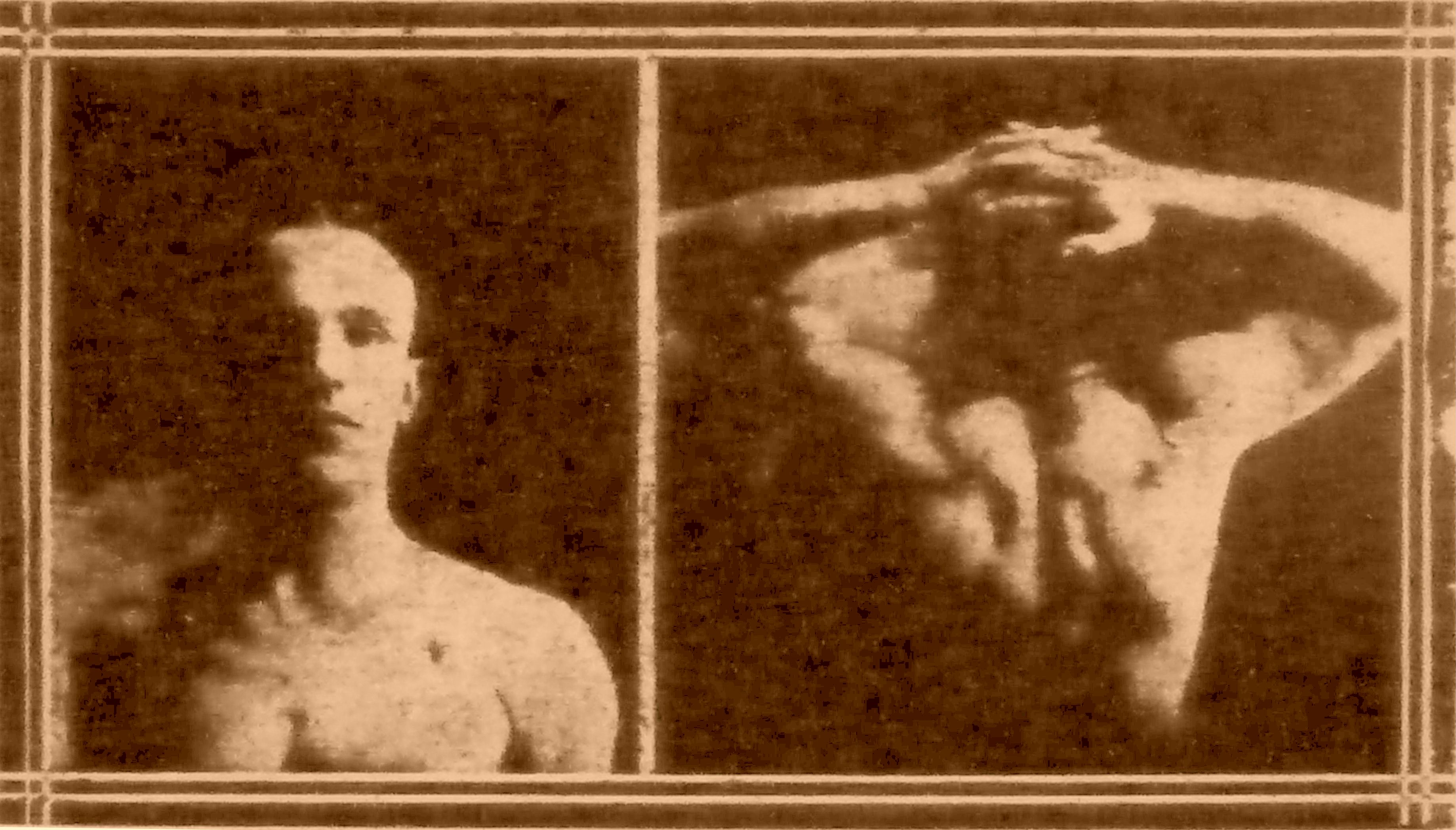
Harold Styan in 1915

Harold Styan, O.B.E., was a physical training instructor during the First World War. By the age of 20 he was an army physical training instructor and drill sergeant, training one battalion after another. In 1921 he was running a school of gymnastics in the Harrogate area, including classes for men and women at the Belvedere YMCA. His name was given to the Harold Styan Charity for Youth, based in Harrogate, and a youth club. He was appointed officer of the Order of the British Empire in 1972 for services to youth. He was a gym master at various schools including Clifton House School, retiring from Grosvenor House School, Harrogate, in 1982 aged 87.

=== Dennis B. Curry ===
In 1953 Dennis Benjamin Curry, (Note: Dennis Benjamin Curry (Skipton 16 May 1919 – Lancaster 1987 ). GRO index: Births Sep 1919 Curry Dennis B (mother: Whitaker) Skipton 9a 51. Deaths May 1987 Curry Denis Benjamin Lancaster 40 1514.) who was a master at the school, drew public attention by crashing his car through a concrete fence and overturning near to Harrogate gas works, at midnight on a Saturday. Those involved escaped with cuts and bruises.

== Notable former pupils ==
Some original letters from Clifton House School old boys Norman Clay and Geoffrey Alfred James Clay are reproduced on Anthony Eden's website. They were written before and during the First World War. Between 2005 and 2012, some old boys of the school mailed their memories of the school to Eden's website. That website is now archived. For example, Jack Ogden remembered "bad food, being caned, memorising Latin and a very pretty young matron who dabbed every inch of me with calamine lotion when I had chickenpox".

=== Arthur Maxwell Ramsden ===
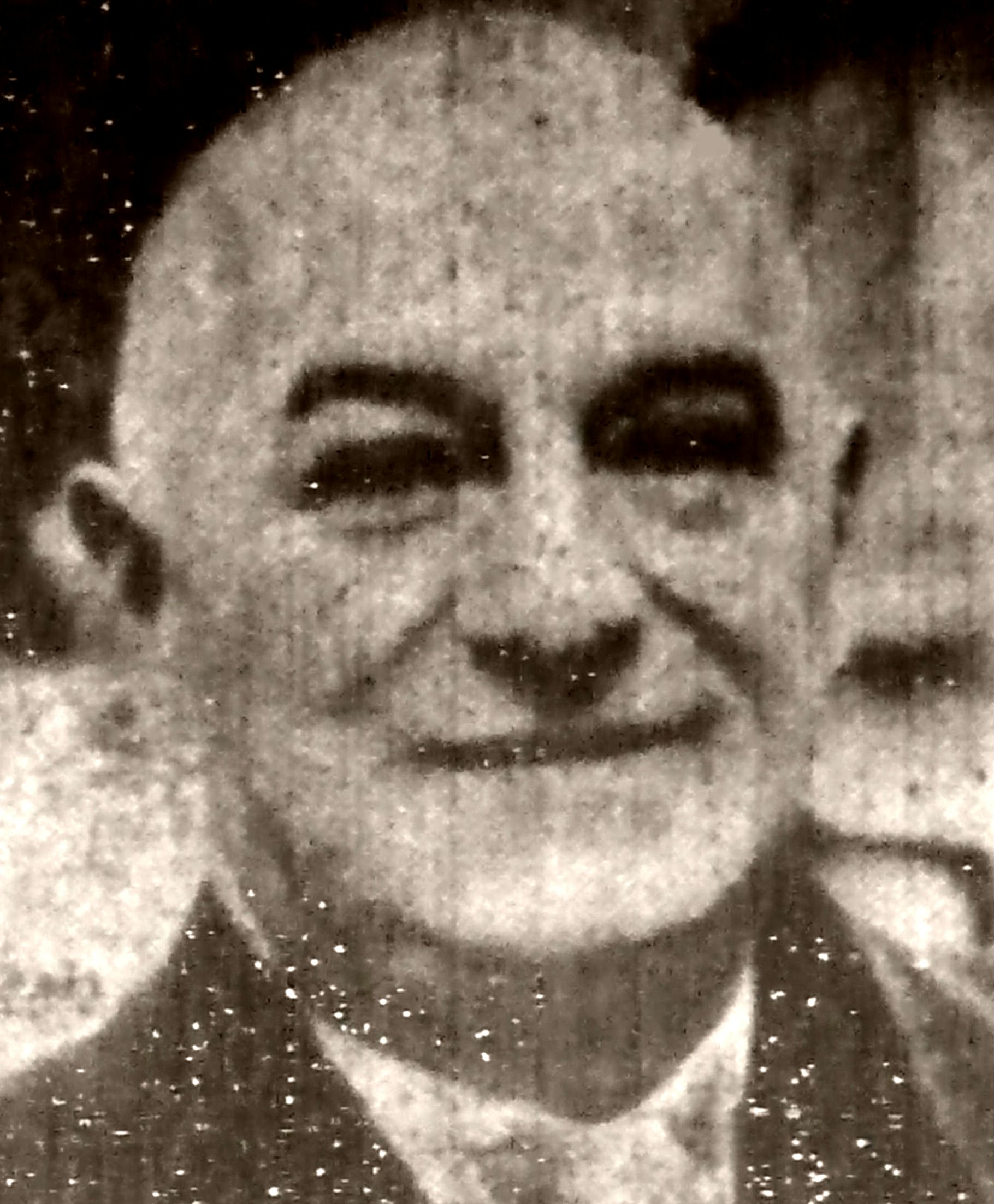
Max Ramsden in 1948

One former pupil of the school was Brigadier Sir Arthur Maxwell "Max" Ramsden, C.B., O.B.E., C.D., D.L., (Note: Arthur Maxwell Ramsden (2 December 1894 – Headingley 7 November 1957). GRO index: Deaths Dec 1957 Ramsden Arthur M. 62 Leeds 2c 182.) who according to the London Gazette was knighted in 1954 for "political and public services to Yorkshire". Following Clifton House, he attended Wakefield Grammar School, had a distinguished military career, and was a partner in the solicitors' firm Ramsden, Sykes and Ramsden, Huddersfield. In 1946 he was president of the City of Leeds Junior Conservative Association, and in 1951 president of Leeds Federation of Young Conservative Associations, later becoming a director of the Yorkshire Conservative Newspaper company. He also served amateur football clubs, boys' clubs and the YMCA. He received his O.B.E. in 1948, and his Order of the Bath in 1945, becoming aide-de-camp to George VI in 1940. He served on the council of Leeds University, and in 1949 was appointed Deputy Lieutenant of the West Riding of Yorkshire. In 1957, at the age of 62, he fatally shot himself following a period of illness.

=== Michael Walsh ===
Another former pupil of the school was Major General Michael Walsh, who was a member of the scout troop there and, according to the Ripon Gazette, "went on to attain the rare distinction of gaining the King's Scout Award with Gold Cords, which at that time was the movement's highest training award for proficiency and achievement". On his retirement from the army in 1981, he returned to North Yorkshire to become the county's Chief Scout, a position he held until 1988. He was awarded the Distinguished Service Order in 1968.

=== Graham Scott ===
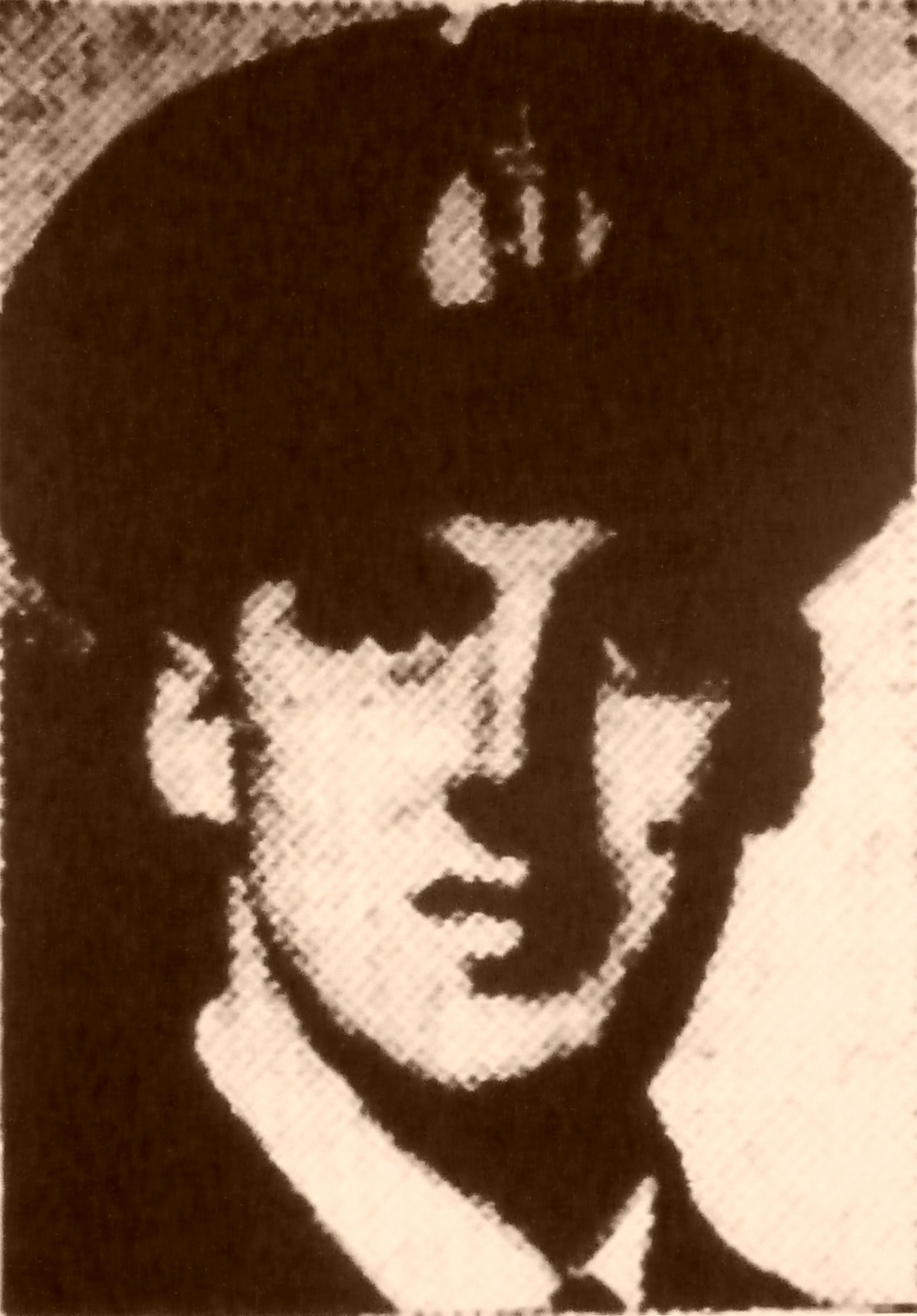
Lt Graham Scott R.N.

Lieutenant Graham Walter Scott of the Royal Navy was an alumnus of Clifton House School. (Note: Graham Walter Scott (c.1928 – 11 November 1952). GRO index: Deaths - Scott Graham W. age 24, Kerrier 7a 53.) He was the second son of Herbert Scott, who owned a chain of grocery stores across Yorkshire, including a branch in Harrogate. He joined the navy in 1945, and served in the cruiser HMS Jamaica off Korea. When he completed his elementary flight training as a naval airman, he came top of his class in practical flying and theory. He was a rugby union player for the Harrogate club. While stationed at Air Station Culdrose, he was killed on 11 November 1952 when piloting a Gloster Meteor, which crashed at Carminawe Farm, Mawgan, near Helston, Cornwall. He had a younger brother, Peter Scott, director of the above grocery chain, who also attended Clifton House School.

=== Malcolm Cubiss ===
Brigadier Malcolm Cubiss of the West Yorkshire Regiment was a pupil of Clifton House School and Bradford Grammar School. (Note: John Malcolm Cubiss (Knaresborough 12 October 1929 – 7 August 2013). GRO index:Births Dec 1929 Cubiss John M (mother: Lambert) Knaresbro' 9a 130.) He joined up in 1947, serving as an officer in the national service with the 1st Battalion in Austria. He served in the Korean War, in which he received the Military Cross for bravery. During his career, he was adjutant of the 5th Battalion of the West Yorkshire Regiment (Territorial Army) York, commanding officer of the King's Division Depot at Strensall, and Deputy Commander, Western District, Shrewsbury. Cubiss lost his right hand in Belfast in 1973. It was replaced with a hook, which he kept "as sharp as a razor", according to The Telegraph.
