= Harold Styan =

English gymnast and teacher (1895–1982)

Harold Styan OBE
- Styan, c. 1972
- Born: 4 March 1895; Harrogate, West Riding of Yorkshire, England
- Died: 30 October 1982 (aged 87); Harrogate, North Yorkshire
- Occupations: Gymnast; physical culturist; physical training instructor; drill sergeant; sports teacher; youth worker
- Years active: 1908–1982
- Known for: Services to youth
- Notable work: Founded Harrogate Boys' Club

Gymnastics career
- Discipline: Men's artistic gymnastics

Harold Styan OBE (4 March 1895 – 30 October 1982) was an English gymnast and physical culturist in the music halls in his youth, a physical training instructor and drill sergeant in the First World War, and a sports teacher and youth worker in Harrogate, Yorkshire, for the rest of his life.

Styan is remembered for running Harrogate Boys' Club and for his work as sports teacher at various Harrogate schools, including Clifton House School. He was appointed Officer of the Order of the British Empire (OBE) in 1972 for his services to youth, and a charity and youth club were named after him.

== Background ==
Styan was born into a Harrogate family which had moved south from the North Riding of Yorkshire. His grandfather was Francis Styan, a butcher, (Note: Francis Styan (Kirkby Overblow 1820 – Harrogate 25 September 1891). GRO index: Deaths Sep 1891 Styan Francis 71 Knaresbro' 9a 73.) and his paternal grandmother was Mary Styan née Green. (Note: Mary Styan née Green (Bradford 1827 – Harrogate 8 April 1868). GRO index: Marriages Dec 1846 Styan Francis and Green Mary Knaresboro XXIII 391. Deaths Jun 1868 Styan Mary 41 Knaresbro' 9a 81.) Harold Styan was the tenth child of Harrogate plumber and housepainter Alfred Styan. (Note: Alfred Styan (Harrogate 1854 – Harrogate 1916). GRO index: Births Jun 1854 Styan Alfred Knaresbro 9a 99. Deaths Mar 1916 Styan Alfred 61 Knaresbro 9a 139.) His mother was Elizabeth née Ward, daughter of gardener John Ward. (Note: Elizabeth Styan née Ward (North Stainley 1855 – Harrogate 1926). GRO index: Births Mar 1856 Ward Elizabeth Gt Ouseburn 9a 84. Marriages Sep 1878 Styan Alfred and Ward Elizabeth Knaresbro' 9a 151. Deaths Mar 1926 Styan Elizabeth 70 Knaresbro' 9a 151.) Alfred and Elizabeth married in 1878 at St Peter's Church, Harrogate.

Styan was born at 51 Nydd Vale Terrace, Harrogate, a terraced house facing the Harrogate railway line, (Note: Harold Styan (Nidd Vale Terrace Harrogate 4 March 1895 – Harrogate 30 October 1982). GRO index: Births Mar 1895 Styan Harold Knaresbro' 9a 113. Deaths Dec 1982. Styan Harold. 87 Claro 2 2057. The family name was probably originally Stein.) and baptised at Christ Church, High Harrogate. In 1921, Styan was unmarried, living with his widowed mother and his brother Harry at 9 Providence Terrace, Harrogate, and working on his own account at various addresses. In 1923, he married May Waggott in Knaresborough. (Note: May Styan née Waggott or Waggett (Bubwith 16 August 1901 – Harrogate 1975). GRO index: Births Sep 1901 Waggott May Chester le S. 10a 614. Marriages Mar 1923 Styan Harold and Waggott May Styan Knaresbro' 9a 186. Deaths Sep 1975 Styan May 16 AU 1901 Claro 2 1820.) They had one daughter, Diana Joan. (Note: Diana Joan Styan (Harrogate 1925 – Harrogate 2005). Unmarried. GRO index: Births Dec 1925 Styan Diana J. (mother nee Waggott) Knaresbro' 9a 146) Styan died on 30 October 1982 at 63 West End Avenue, Harrogate, where he had lived for much of his life.

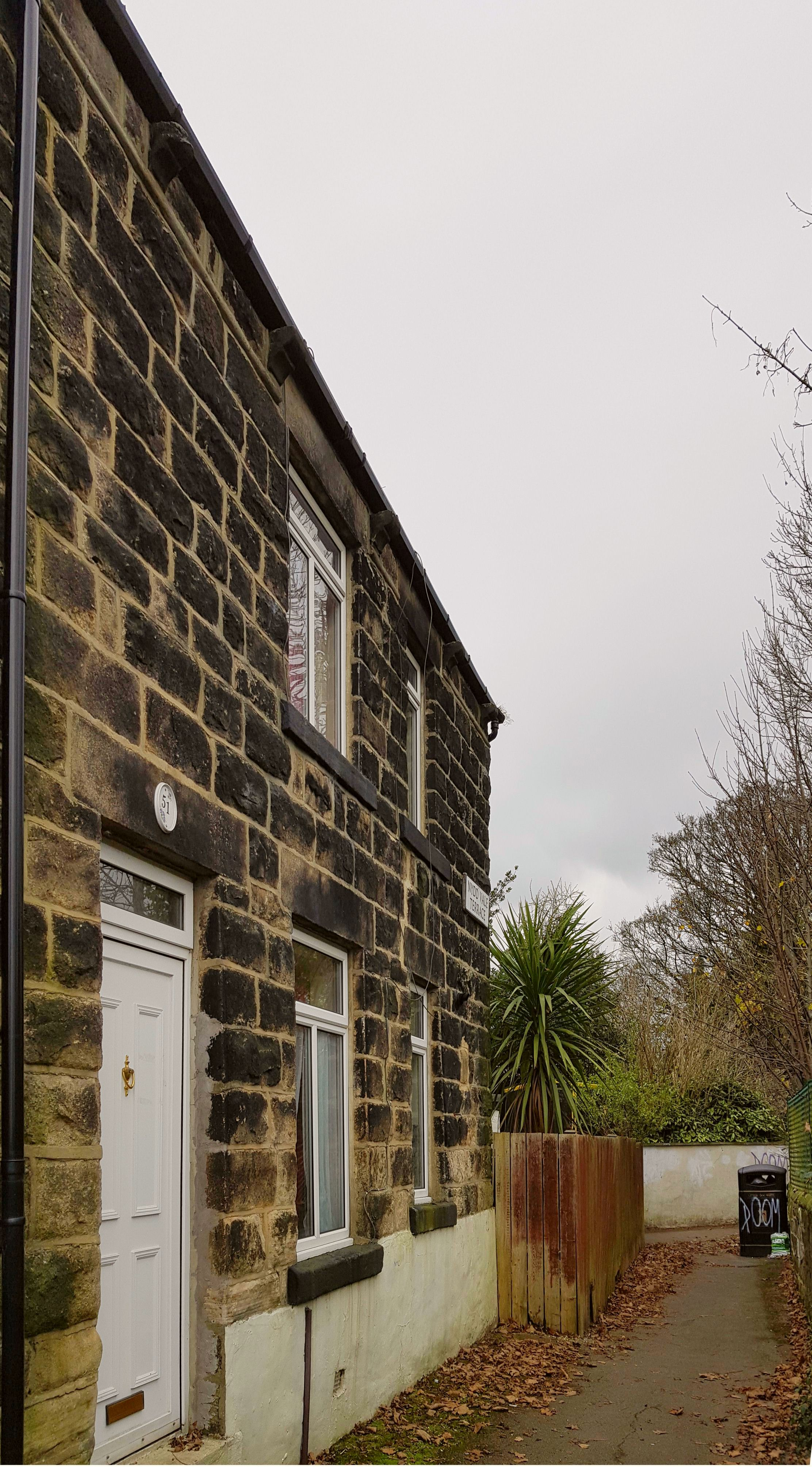
Styan's working-class, soot-stained, end-of-terrace birthplace

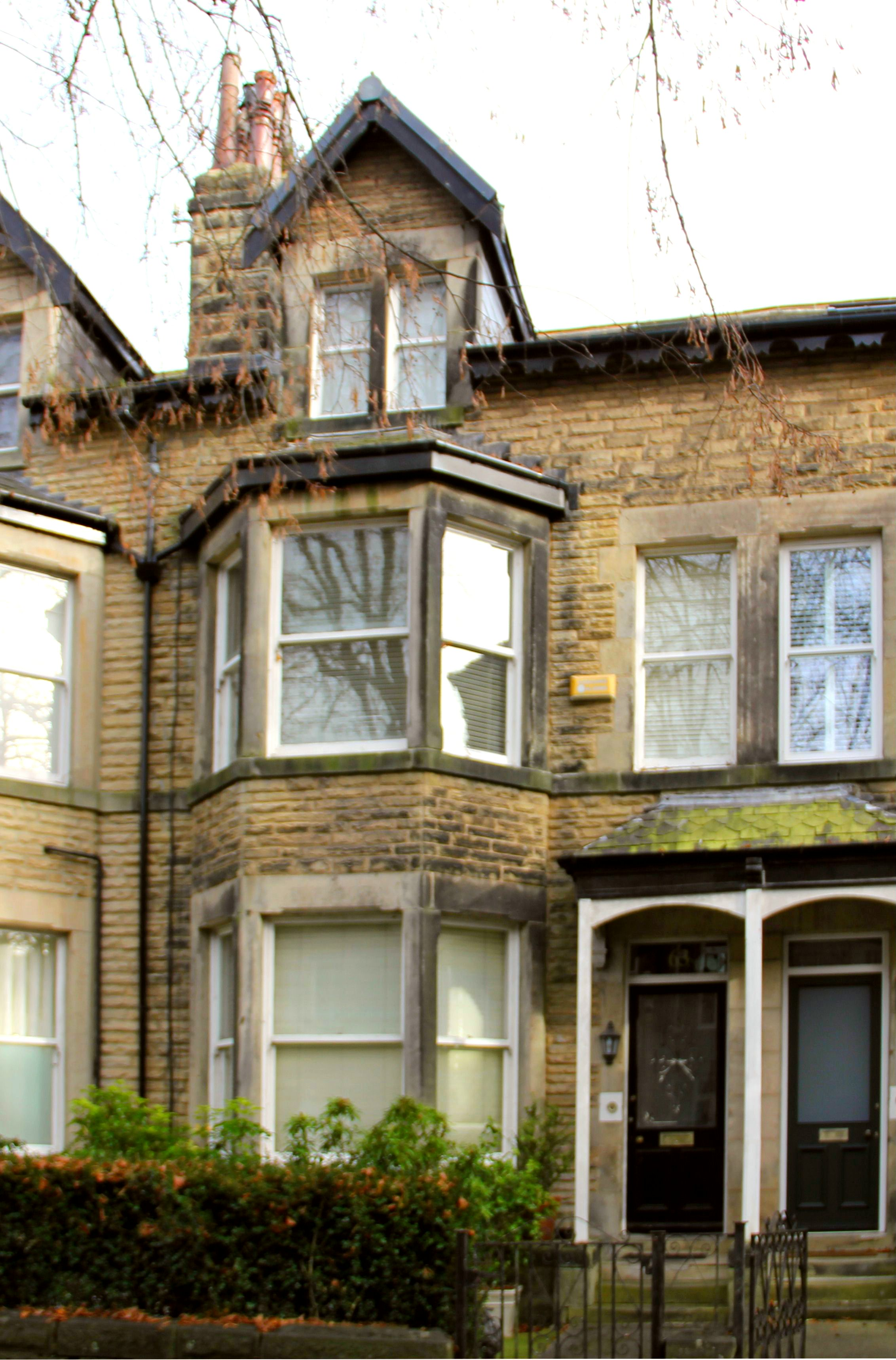
A middle-class house, Styan's home of some decades

== Career ==
At age 13 Styan started his athletic training. He was employed as a page boy at Harrogate's Grand Opera House at the same time, and made his stage debut as a gymnast at 16. He toured music halls, first in Harrogate then country-wide, including London, with Mademoiselle La Dores' troupe.

=== First World War ===
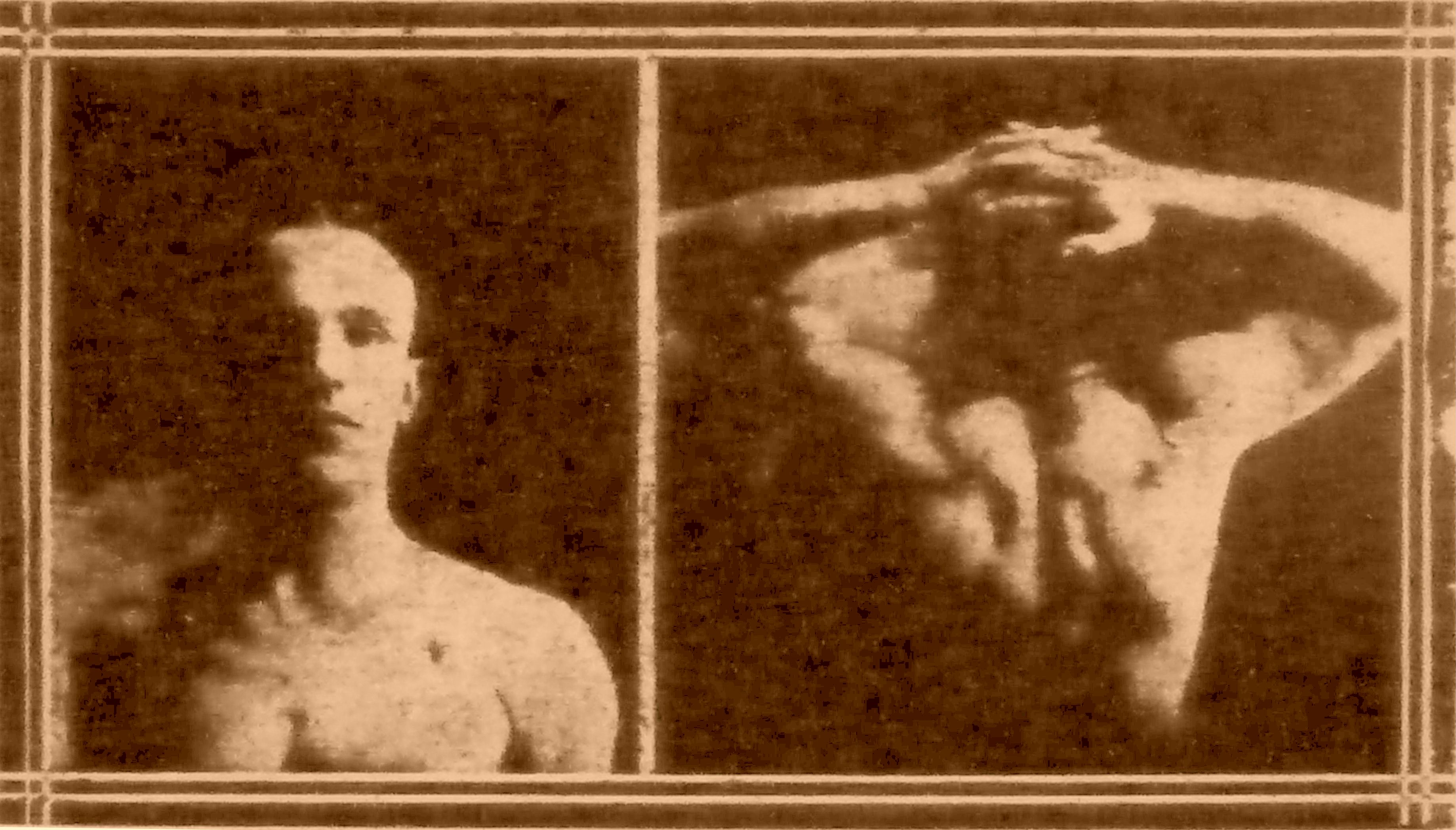
Styan in c.1915

Styan was a physical training instructor during the First World War. He enlisted in 1914 in the 1st West Yorks, and his physical skills earned him promotion; he was trained at Aldershot in Swedish gymnastics. Thus by the age of 20 he was an army physical training instructor and drill sergeant, training one battalion after another. The Harrogate Herald reported: "He ... received a testimonial from Captain Milnes of the RAMC for his treatment and massaging of the wounded".

=== Training, teaching, coaching, and youth work ===
In 1921 Styan was running a school of gymnastics in the Harrogate area, including classes for men and women at the Belvedere YMCA. Ripley and District Horticultural and Agricultural Show historians wrote that, "In 1921 the Main Ring attraction [at the Ripley Show] was a display by Harold Styan's School of Gymnastics". In 1926 he was presented with "a memento of his work in training the Claro division tug-of-war team to win numerous Yorkshire competitions", according to The Leeds Mercury. In 1942 he was refereeing at a boxing match in Harrogate.

By April 1946 he had founded, and was running, the Harrogate Boys' Club in New Park, where he was often visited by former members, now in the military, who came to see their "popular leader", according to the Harrogate Herald. In 1947, for the benefit of the RAF Benevolent Fund, Styan organised a gymnastic display by the same club. He was a gym master at various schools including Clifton House School, retiring from Grosvenor House School, Harrogate, in 1982 aged 87.

=== Reminiscences of Styan ===
Former Clifton House School pupil David Hitchen remembered Styan for, "endless exercises and jumps!! and the amount of snuff he used to take to clear his throat!". Another pupil from the same school, Jack Ogden, later related a tale that, "well into his old age [Styan] was attacked by two yobs on the Stray and laid both of them out flat".

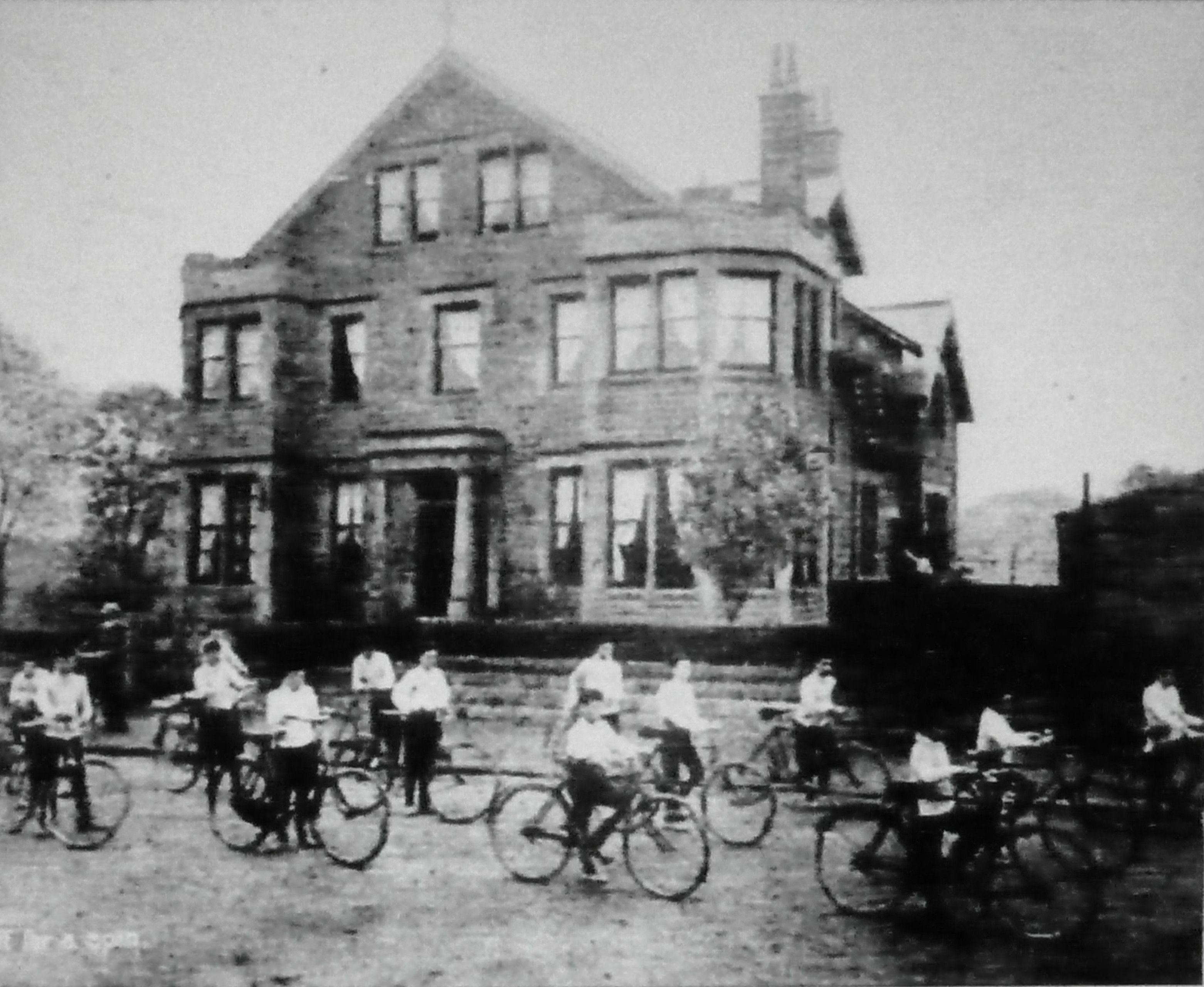
Clifton House School, where Styan taught

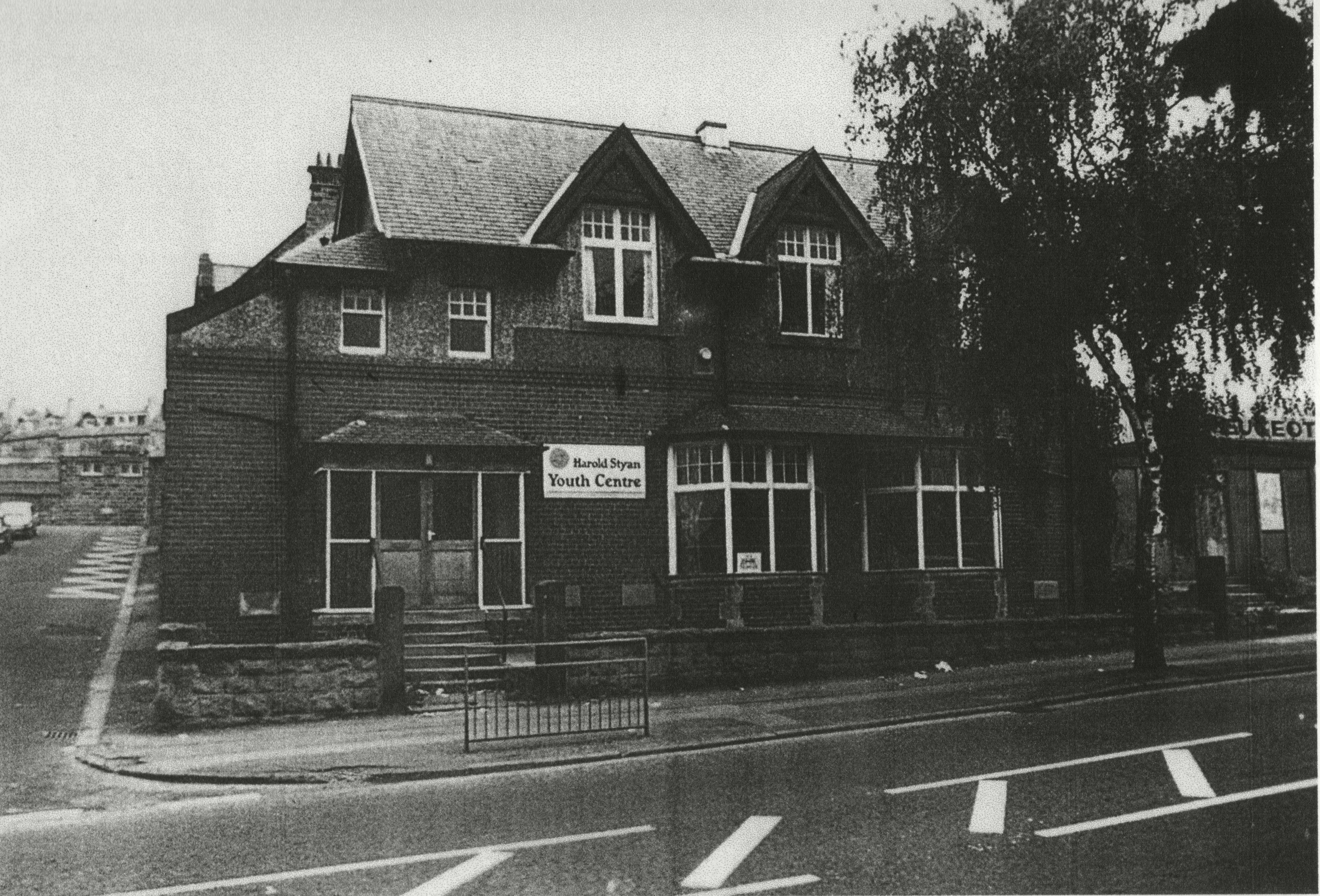
Styan Boys' Club

== Awards and recognition ==
Styan was appointed Officer of the Order of the British Empire (OBE) in 1972 for services to youth in Harrogate. His name was given to the Harold Styan Charity for Youth (HSCY), registered in 1964 and based in Harrogate, also the Harold Styan Football Club, the Jennyfield Styan Community Centre, and a youth club. The Harold Styan Boys' Club was in existence until at least 1962. As of 2024 the HSCY was still in existence.
