= Styan =

Styan is a surname. Notable people with the surname include:

- Andy Styan (born 1947), British fell runner
- Frederick William Styan (1858–1934), English tea merchant
- Harold Styan O.B.E. (1895–1982), English gymnast, physical culturist, P.T. instructor, drill sergeant, sports teacher and youth worker
