= Listed buildings in Harrogate (Stray Ward) =

Stray is a ward in the town of Harrogate, North Yorkshire, England. It contains ten listed buildings that are recorded in the National Heritage List for England. Of these, two are listed at Grade II*, the middle of the three grades, and the others are at Grade II, the lowest grade. The ward is to the south of the town, it is residential, and includes the area of parkland known as The Stray. The listed buildings consist of houses, two well heads, two churches, and two lamp posts.

== Key ==
Grade	Criteria
II*	Particularly important buildings of more than special interest
II	Buildings of national importance and special interest

== Buildings ==
Name and location	Photograph	Date	Notes	Grade
Wedderburn; 53.99169°N 1.52040°W		c. 1786	The house is in stone with a sill band, a cornice, a parapet and slate roofs. There are two storeys and five bays, the middle three bays projecting under a pediment, and flanking lower two-storey wings. The windows are sashes, those in the ground floor in recessed arches. In the centre is a 20th-century porch with a pediment, and a doorway with a fanlight.	II
Bede House; 53.98764°N 1.52665°W		Early 19th century	A house, later extended and converted into a school, it is in gritstone, with a cornice, a parapet and a slate roof. There are two storeys, a range of five bays, and a projecting three-bay wing at the northeast. On the front is a Tuscan prostyle portico, and a semi-elliptical doorway with a fanlight. The windows are slightly recessed sashes. The later extensions incorporate a former three-stage stable clock tower with corner pilasters and finials.	II
St John's Well; 53.99335°N 1.52095°W		1842	The well head, which replaced an earlier one, is a pavilion in gritstone, with pilasters, a cornice and a pierced parapet. There is an octagonal plan, with three windows and a doorway alternating with plain panelled sides. The doorway and the windows are round-arched with an architrave and a pediment, the doorway pediment on console brackets.	II*
Tewit Well; 53.98538°N 1.53456°W		c. 1842	The well head was transferred from the site of the Old Sulphur Well. It is an open circular pavilion with twelve Tuscan columns, six standing on the plinth and the other six on a pedestal. The well has a modern concrete cover, and the pavilion has a fibreglass roof.	II*
Trinity Methodist Church; 53.98582°N 1.54014°W		177–80	The steeple was completed in 1889. The church is in rusticated gritstone with a slate roof. It consists of a nave, a porch, north and south transepts, a sanctuary, and a northwest steeple with a broach spire.	II
17 Park Drive; 53.98420°N 1.53915°W	—	1892	The house is in red brick, with moulded brick dressings, and slate roofs with ornate terracotta ridge tiles. There are two storeys, and on the front is a round-headed moulded archway, and an inner porch with a segmental-headed doorway with a fanlight and an oval window to the right, and above it is a single-light window. To the left is a canted bay window, above which is a gable containing a three-light casement window. To the right is a tripartite window in the ground floor and a two-light casement window above.	II
36 and 38 Leeds Road; 53.98148°N 1.53638°W	—	1898	A pair of semi-detached houses in stone, with bracketed cornices and a slate roof. There are two storeys, a four-bay central range and projecting three-storey pedimented wings. The doorways are round-headed with fanlights and decorative pediments on brackets. In the ground floor of each wing is a square bay window, above which is a two-light window, and in the top floor is a round-headed window breaking the pediment, with a semicircular balcony and iron railings. To the right is an octagonal turret with a spire and a finial.	II
St Mark's Church; 53.98207°N 1.53558°W		1898–1905	The church, designed by John Oldrid Scott, is in stone with decoration in red sandstone and tile roofs. It consists of a nave with a clerestory, north and south aisles, a south porch, and a chancel with a south chapel and vestry and a north organ chamber. At the west end is a later gabled porch, above which is a circular window, and flanked by gabled buttresses and octagonal spires.	II
Lamp post, Trinity Road (east); 53.98582°N 1.53859°W	—	1899 (or later)	The lamp post is in cast iron, with a cylindrical base containing a door with a coat of arms. Above this is a series of bands and a circular column carrying a square block with ball-ended ladder supports. At the top are scrolled lamp supports and three lamps.	II
Lamp post, Trinity Road (north); 53.98655°N 1.54120°W	—	1899 (or later)	The lamp post is in cast iron, with a cylindrical base containing a door with a coat of arms. Above this is a series of bands and a circular column carrying a square block with ball-ended ladder supports. At the top are scrolled lamp supports and three lamps.	II
