= St John's Well =

Well in Harrogate, England

Coordinates: 53°59′36″N 1°31′15″W

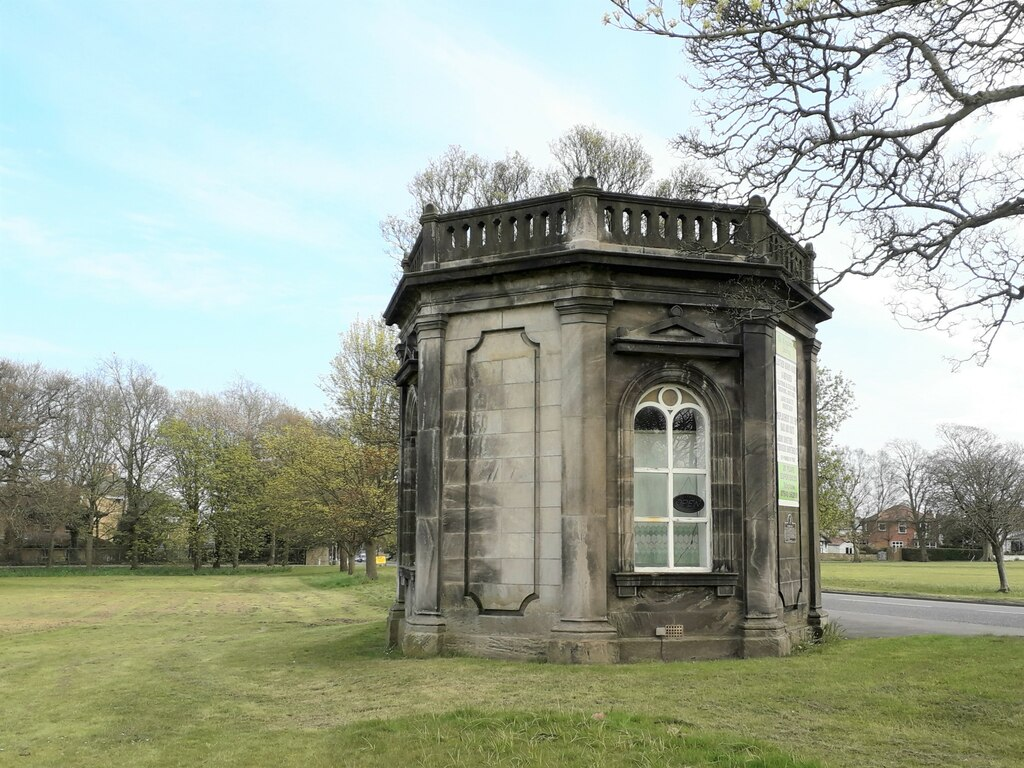
The wellhead, in 2021

St John's Well is a spa water well in Harrogate, a town in North Yorkshire, in England.

The well was discovered in about 1631 by Dr Michael Stanhope, who wrote about it in Cures without Care. It was the second to be identified in the area, after the Tewit Well. It was initially known as the "Old Spaw", and later as the "Sweet Spa". A toilet block was constructed by 1656, then a wellhead was built in 1788 by Alexander Wedderburn. In about 1842, this was replaced by a new wellhead, designed by Isaac Shutt. The well closed in 1973. The wellhead has been grade II* listed since 1949.

The wellhead is a pavilion in gritstone, with pilasters, a cornice and a pierced parapet. There is an octagonal plan, with three windows and a doorway alternating with plain panelled sides. The doorway and the windows are round-arched with an architrave and a pediment, the doorway pediment on console brackets.

== See also ==
- Grade II* listed buildings in North Yorkshire (district)
- Listed buildings in Harrogate (Stray Ward)
