= Norwood College =

Former school in Harrogate, North Yorkshire, England

Coordinates: 53.984°N 1.537°W

Information
- School type: Boarding and Day School
- Established: 1936
- Founder: Gordon Cass
- Closed: 1972
- Gender: Boys
- Enrollment: 110 (1961)

Norwood College was a private boys' school located in Harrogate, North Yorkshire, England. It was founded on 8 May 1936, by Gordon William George Cass, a former teacher, known as "Charlie" to his pupils. The school was on a corner site with the original part in Tewit Well Avenue and the later part in Leeds Road, close to The Stray.

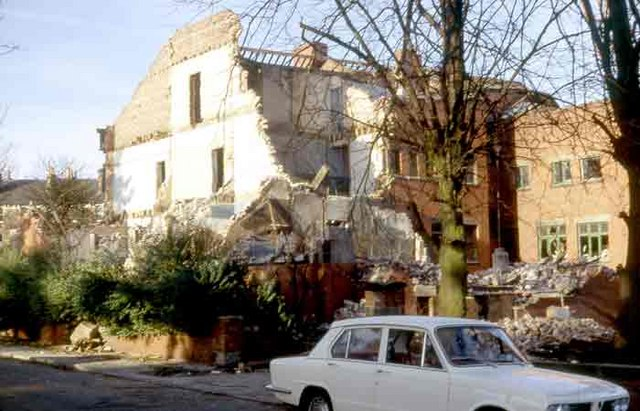
The school being demolished in November 1972

As of its 25th anniversary in 1961, it had 110 pupils, of whom 40 were boarders and 70 were day students. The college included a lower school where basic subjects were taught; a middle school with a more general curriculum, from which boys could take the Common Entrance Examination for public schools, the Preceptor's Exams, or the London Chamber of Commerce examination; and an upper school where boys prepared for a General Certificate of Education. Some boys remained at the school after attaining that certificate, studying for university entrance, the military, or preliminary examinations for the professions.

The Norwood crest was taken from the crest of the Harrogate Coat of Arms with the Norwood motto added: Gentilhomme a Jamais, Always a Gentleman.

"Norwood was, however, not an instant creation; Charlie left his teaching job at Clifton House School in early 1936 and with two pupils he taught in a room behind the Old Lion House Hotel, as a tutor rather than a paid employee of a school; a short time later, he took on the Tewit Well Avenue property, now having acquired ten pupils. The ten rose to 27 and now a name was needed. The name of Sunnyside School was suggested but thankfully declined; perhaps someone had been reading Enid Blyton and similar children's books of the day! As mentioned earlier in Charlie's First World War Experiences, Charlie chose the name Norwood so Norwood College it was and the school was established on 8 May 1936."

The school closed on 24 March 1972, and the building was demolished later that year. A block of flats was built in its place, called Hanover House.
