= St Mark's Church, Harrogate =

St Mark's Church,Harrogate
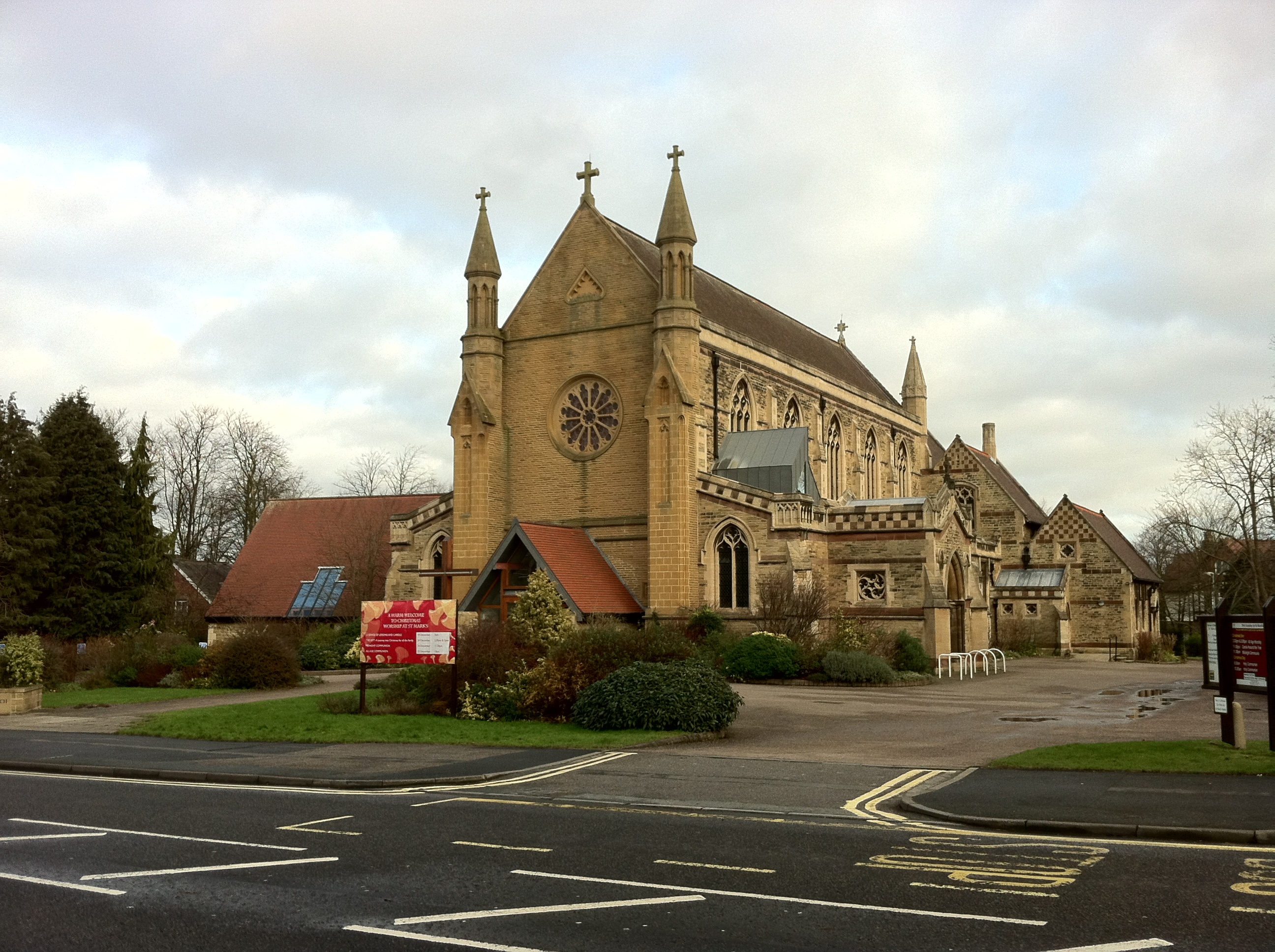
- St Mark's Church,Harrogate

- 53°58′55.73″N 1°32′8.86″W
- Denomination: Church of England
- Churchmanship: Charismatic open evangelical
- Website: http://www.smch.org.uk

History
- Dedication: St. Mark

Administration
- Province: Province of York
- Diocese: Diocese of Leeds
- Archdeaconry: Richmond and Craven
- Deanery: Harrogate
- Parish: Harrogate St Mark

Clergy
- Vicar: Mike Resch

St. Mark's Church, Harrogate is a parish church in the Church of England located in Harrogate. The church is a Grade II listed building.

== History ==
The congregation formed in 1893 and held services in a mission room. The church was built in 1898 to designs by the architect John Oldrid Scott. It comprises a nave with aisles and south porch. The chancel has a south chapel and vestry. On the north side is the organ chamber. The church was opened on 21 July 1899 by William Boyd Carpenter, Bishop of Ripon.

The west end was completed between 1920 and 1959, but without the west end tower originally planned for it by the architect.

The church was restored in 1997 and re-opened by David Young, Bishop of Ripon.

In the present day, St Mark's Church is located in the Archdeaconry of Richmond and Craven of the Anglican Diocese of Leeds, and identifies with charismatic and open evangelical traditions of the Church of England.

== Organ ==
The church contains and organ by Robert Hope-Jones which was rebuilt in 1907 by Norman and Beard, and then by Hill, Norman and Beard in 1951. Some rebuilding work was undertaken in 1980 by John Jackson, and again in 1982 by Peter Wood and Son. A specification of the organ can be found on the National Pipe Organ Register.

== Notable people ==
- Arun Arora, former Director of Communications of the Church of England, served his curacy here.

== See also ==
- Listed buildings in Harrogate (Stray Ward)
