= Jack Ogden (jewellery historian) =

British jewellery historian

Jack Ogden FSA, FGA
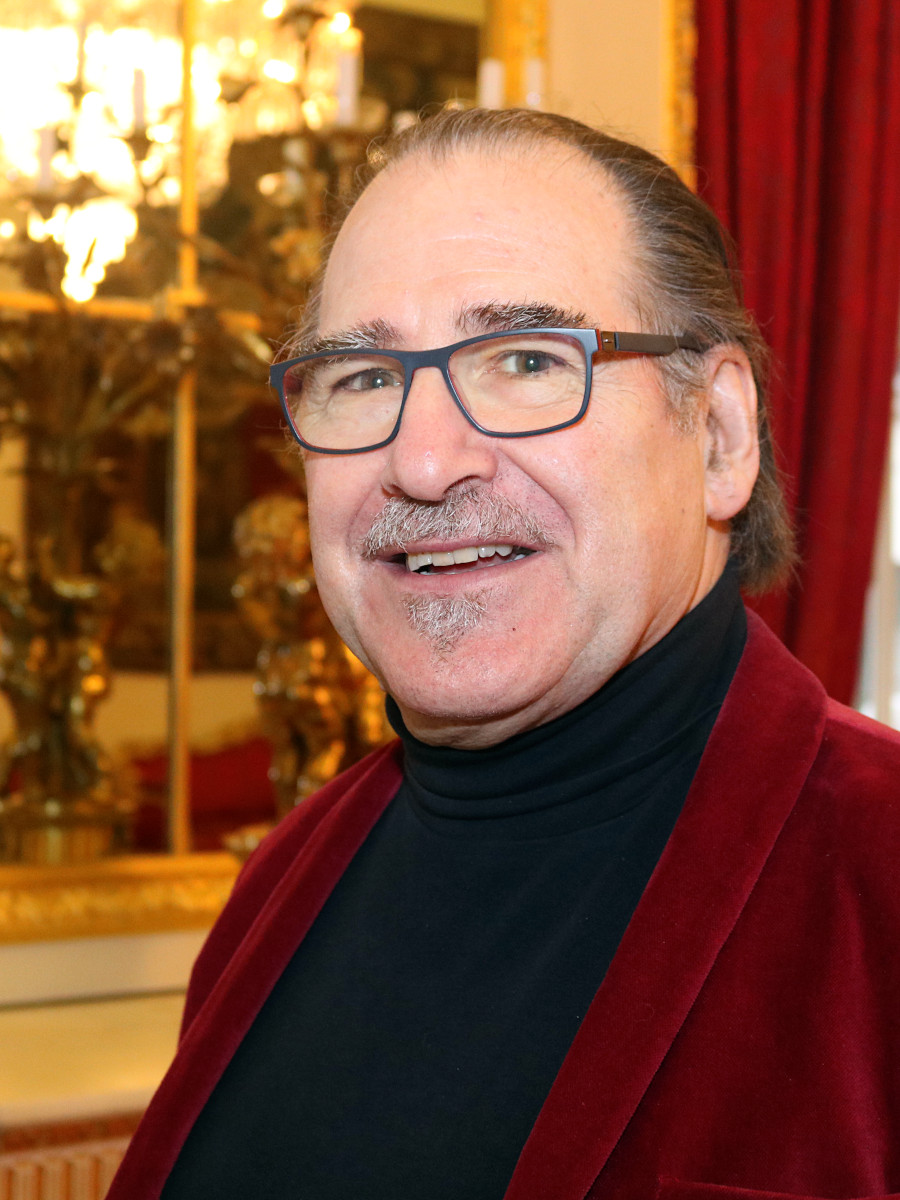
- Ogden in 2018
- Occupation: Jewellery historian
- Known for: Authentication of historic precious metal objects...

Academic background
- Education: University of Durham
- Thesis: Gold jewellery in Ptolemaic, Roman and Byzantine Egypt (1990)

Academic work
- Main interests: Historical development of jewellery materials and techniques; History of the gem trade and gem cutting; Use of 3D graphics in re-creating historic goldwork
- Notable works: 1982 book Jewellery of the Ancient World: The Materials and Techniques of Ancient Jewellery, Trefoil, London; 1994 book with D. Williams, Greek Gold: Jewellery of the Classical World, British Museum Press, London; 2018 book Diamonds: The early history of the king of gems'. Yale University Press
- Notable ideas: Founding The Society of Jewellery Historians
- Website: https://independent.academia.edu/OgdenJack

Jack M. Ogden, FSA, FGA, is a British jewellery historian whose research focuses on the development of materials and technology, and the authentication of ancient and historic jewellery. He is considered one of the foremost experts in his field. He has published multiple books and articles, lectured extensively, advised museums and auction houses, and served in academic and industry roles. His 1982 book, Jewellery of the Ancient World (Trefoil and Rizzoli), a study of ancient Old World jewellery technology and materials, received high praise and is still considered the standard work on the subject. Ogden is the founder and a past President of The Society of Jewellery Historians.

== Biography ==
=== Early life and education ===
Ogden was born into the fourth generation of a family retail jewellery company based in Harrogate, North Yorkshire. He attended Clifton House School in Harrogate until age 13.

From childhood he showed an interest in archaeology, particularly Egyptology. A visit to the exhibition Tutankhamun and His Time at the Petit Palais, Paris in 1967 is said to have influenced his later research direction.

Ogden attended Tonbridge School for his secondary education and left formal education at age 16 to work in the family jewellery shop.

Later, Ogden pursued academic qualifications: his PhD from Durham University was awarded based on his demonstrated work, with the thesis Gold jewellery in Ptolemaic, Roman and Byzantine Egypt. His supervisor was Prof John Harris, then Chair of Egyptology and the Director of the School of Oriental Studies at Durham. Although leaving formal education with neither A levels nor a university degree, Durham was happy to accept his 1982 book as an 'equivalent qualification'.

He also obtained the Gemmology Diploma (FGA) with distinction from the Gemmological Association of Great Britain, and a Diploma in Art, Profession, Law & Ethics with distinction from the Institute of Art & Law.

His first academic article, on Roman imitation diamonds, was published in 1973. A detailed study of platinum group element inclusions in ancient gold objects followed in 1977, that same year, conversations with the late John Goodall FSA on ways to bring together academics from around the world who had an interest in the history of jewellery led to the founding of the Society of Jewellery Historians.

Publishers of his writings include The British Museum Press, University of California Press, Cambridge University Press, Oxford University Press, Yale University Press, the Getty Conservation Institute and several peer-reviewed journals. His books and articles are widely cited in the academic literature dealing with jewellery history and precious metals. Although primarily focusing on jewellery, he has a wide interest in ancient Metals and contributed the chapter on metals in Ancient Egyptian materials and technology (Cambridge University Press, 2000).

Ogden has made various TV appearances and radio broadcasts, including interviews on historical aspects of jewellery, and acted as a historical consultant and a presenter for a multi-part documentary series on sapphires by China state broadcaster Central China Television (CCTV).

=== Career ===
Ogden initially worked in the family jewellery company founded by his great-grandfather, James R Ogden and Sons Ltd. In 1982 he acquired the London premises on Duke Street, St James's, and ran it as a gallery specialising in ancient and historic jewellery. After the lease expired in 1985, he gradually withdrew from retail operations to focus on consultancy work, research and writing.

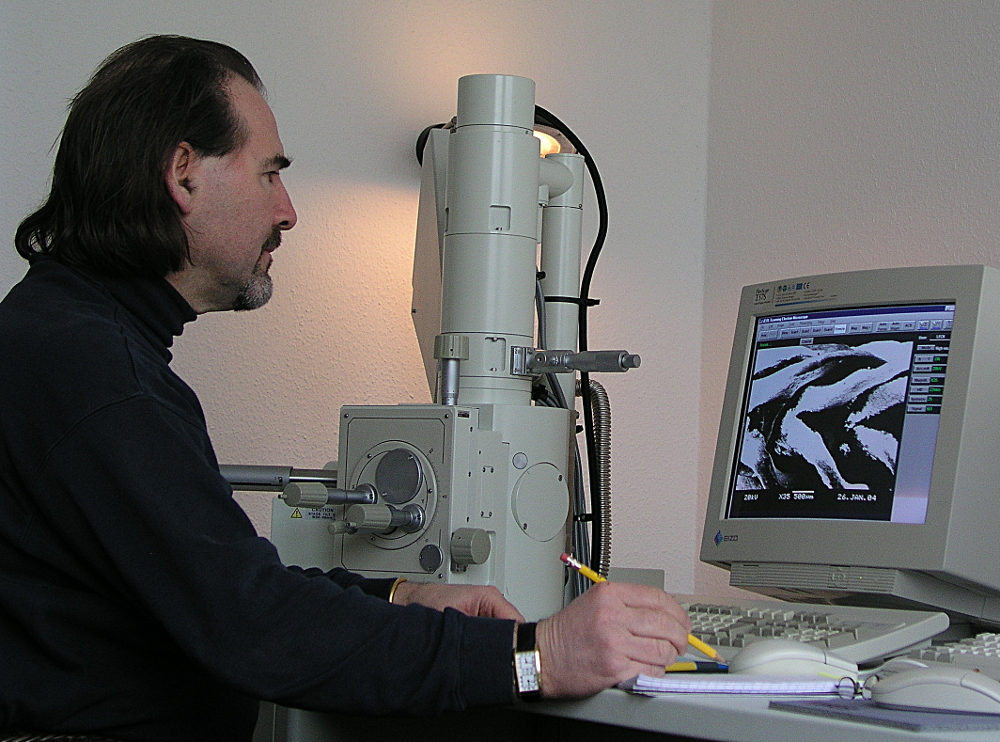
Jack Ogden examining Roman copper alloy chain with a scanning electron microscope

He has held leadership and administrative roles in the jewellery sector, including serving as the Secretary General to the World Jewellery Confederation and Chief Executive of the National Association of Goldsmiths (now part of the National Association of Jewellers), a combined position (1995–2000) and as Chief Executive of the Gemmological Association of Great Britain (2004–2012).

Ogden was appointed to the Treasure Valuation Committee (responsible for agreeing a value on UK archaeological treasure finds) in 1996 – 2013, serving as vice-chairman 2007 – 2013. He was on the Governing Board of the Egypt Exploration Society 1983 – 1990, and was a Trustee of the Gemmological Association of Great Britain (2015–2018).

Ogden was the Chair of British Standards (BSI) Committee STI/53 (Specifications and test methods for jewellery and horology) on which he has served from 1995 to 2000 and 2005–2023.

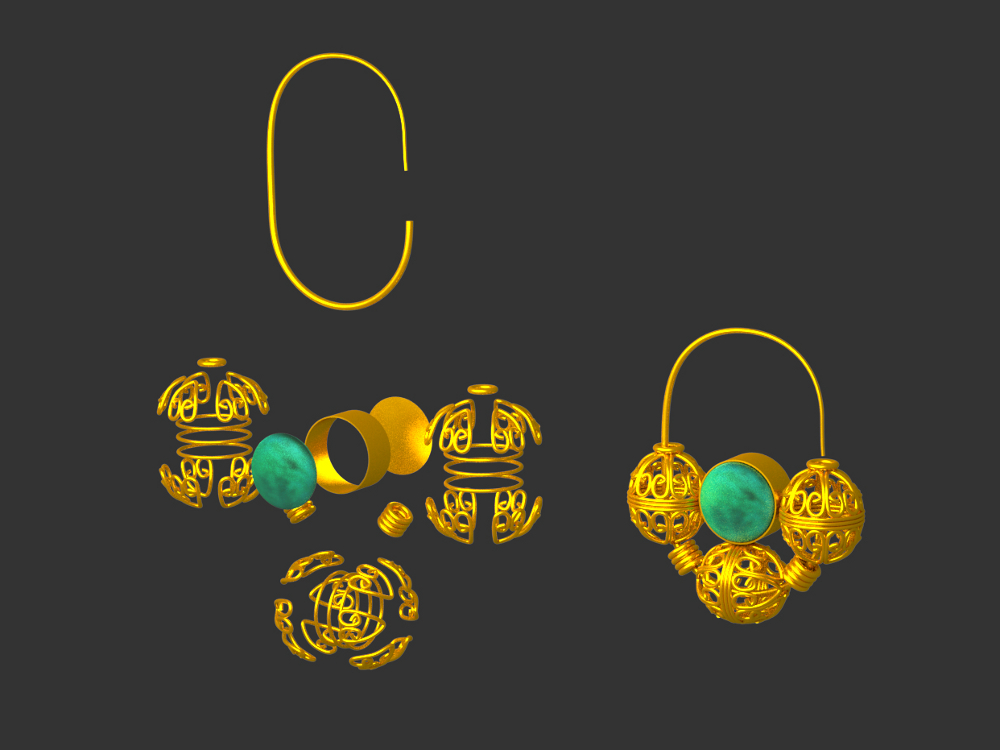
Example of Dr Jack Ogden's 3D graphics – the construction of an Islamic earring type

In academia, Ogden was elected a Fellow of the Society of Antiquaries of London (FSA) in 1980 and a Life Fellow of the Gemmological Association of Great Britain in 2014.

He was appointed visiting professor of Ancient Jewellery, Materials and Technology, at the Birmingham School of Jewellery Birmingham City University in 2019

As a consultant, Ogden advises museums, collectors, dealers, and auction houses on issues of authenticity and materials of ancient and historic jewellery, taking a holistic approach that considers style, technology, and composition.

=== Personal life ===
Ogden plays the 5-string banjo and creates 3-D computer graphics on jewellery construction. He lives with his partner, Sara Abey in Henley-on-Thames, South Oxfordshire, and has three daughters.

== Selected bibliography ==
Ogden is an author or co-author of several books and numerous articles on various aspects of the history of jewellery technology and materials, from scientific to popular. A full bibliography is available. Many of his articles are available online.

=== Books and chapters in books include ===
1982

- Jewellery of the Ancient World: The Materials and Techniques of Ancient Jewellery, Trefoil, London. OCLC No: 929802319

1987

- Islamic goldsmithing techniques in the early medieval period: the Benjamin Zucker collection, in ed. D.J. Content, Islamic Rings and Gems, Philip Wilson, London. OCLC No: 908849111

1992

- Interpreting the Past: Ancient Jewellery, British Museum Press, London and University of California Press, Berkeley and Los Angeles. ISBN 0520080300 ISBN 978-0520080300 OCLC No: 716103810 Google books, Jack Ogden – Ancient Jewellery

1994

- With D. Williams, Greek Gold: Jewellery of the Classical World, British Museum Press, London. OCLC No: 875379733 Google books, Jack Ogden – Greek gold
- The Technology of Medieval Jewellery. in eds. D. A. Scott, J. Podany and B. B. Considine, Ancient and Historic metals: Conservation and Scientific Research, Getty Conservation Institute Malibu. OCLC No: 802967527 The Getty Conservation Institute (GCI) Publications

1995

- The Gold Jewellery, In ed C.-M. Bennett and P. Bienkowski, Excavations at Tawilan in Southern Jordan, Oxford University Press. OCLC No: 879106095

1998

- The Jewellery of Dark Age Greece: Construction and Cultural Connections. Ed.D. Williams, The Art of the Greek Goldsmith, British Museum Press, London. OCLC No: 39820658

2000

- Ancient Egyptian Metals, Eds. P.T. Nicholson & I. Shaw, Ancient Egyptian Materials and Technology, Cambridge University Press. OCLC No: 449825743

2003

- Connections between Islam, Europe, and the Far East in the Medieval Period: The Evidence of the Jewelry Technology, Eds P. Jett, J Douglas, B. McCarthy, J Winter. Scientific Research in the Field of Asian Art, Fiftieth-Anniversary Symposium Proceedings. Archetype Publications, London in association with the Freer Gallery of Art, Smithsonian Institution. Link to article OCLC No: 615473193

2004

- Revivers of the Lost Art: Alessandro Castellani and the Quest for Classical Precision in the exhibition catalogue: Castellani and Italian Archaeological Jewelry, edited by Susan Weber Soros and Stefanie Walker, Yale University Press and the Bard Graduate Center. (Also Italian translation 2005) OCLC No: 907117272

2007

- Brainbiter: The saga of Hereward the Wake. Penpress. (Fiction) OCLC No: 170956559 Google books, Jack Ogden – Brainbiter

2009

- A History of Enamelling Techniques in Enamels of the World 1700 – 2000, Ed. Haydn Williams, The Khalili Family Trust, London. OCLC No: 262894331

2010

- Gold' in Tutankhamun's Footwear: Studies of Ancient Egyptian Footwear, Ed. André J. Veldmeijer, Drukware. OCLC No: 760141408 Google books, André J. Veldmeijer – Tutankhamun's Footwear

2013

- With Michael Spink, The Art of Adornment: Jewellery of the Islamic Lands, The Nasser D. Khalili Collection of Islamic Art, xvii (London: Nour Foundation in association with Azimuth Editions, 2013). OCLC No: 913073688 The Khalili Collections

2013

- Gems and the Gem Trade in India in Beyond Extravagance: a Royal Collection of Gems and Jewels, ed. Amin Jaffer, Assouline, New York. OCLC No: 839389448 Google books – Beyond Extravagance

2018

- Diamonds: The early history of the king of gems, Yale University Press – 'This richly illustrated history of diamonds illuminates myriad facets of the "king of gems,"'

2024

- Jewelry Technology in the Ancient and Medieval World, Brynmorgen, Harpswell (ME)

=== Articles include ===
- 1977 Platinum group metal inclusions in ancient gold artefacts, Journal of Historical Metallurgy, 11, 2. pp. 53 – 72.
- 1990 With S. Schmidt. Late Antique Jewellery: Pierced Work and Hollow Beaded Wire, Jewellery Studies 4. pp. 5 – 12.
- 1990/1 Gold in a time of Bronze and iron, The Journal of the Ancient Chronology Forum, 4. pp. 6 – 14.
- 1991 Classical Gold wire: Some Aspects of its Manufacture and Use, Jewellery Studies, 5. pp. 95 – 105.
- 1992 Gold in Antiquity, Interdisciplinary Science Review, 17/3.
- 1993 Granulation and a Greek Astronaut (a reinterpretation of Lucian) Jewellery Studies, 6. p. 73.
- 2005 Diamonds, Head Hunters and a Prattling Fool: The British Exploitation of Borneo Diamonds, Gems and Jewellery, 14, 3, September 2005. pp. 67 – 69.
- 2005 The Great American Platinum Controversy'. Gems and Jewellery, 14, 3 December 2005. pp. 86 – 87.
- 2016 A Matter of Opinion, Art Antiquity and Law. 21/3, 269 – 279.
