= Tewit Well =

Well and pavilion in Harrogate, North Yorkshire, England

Coordinates: 53.98535°N 1.53457°W

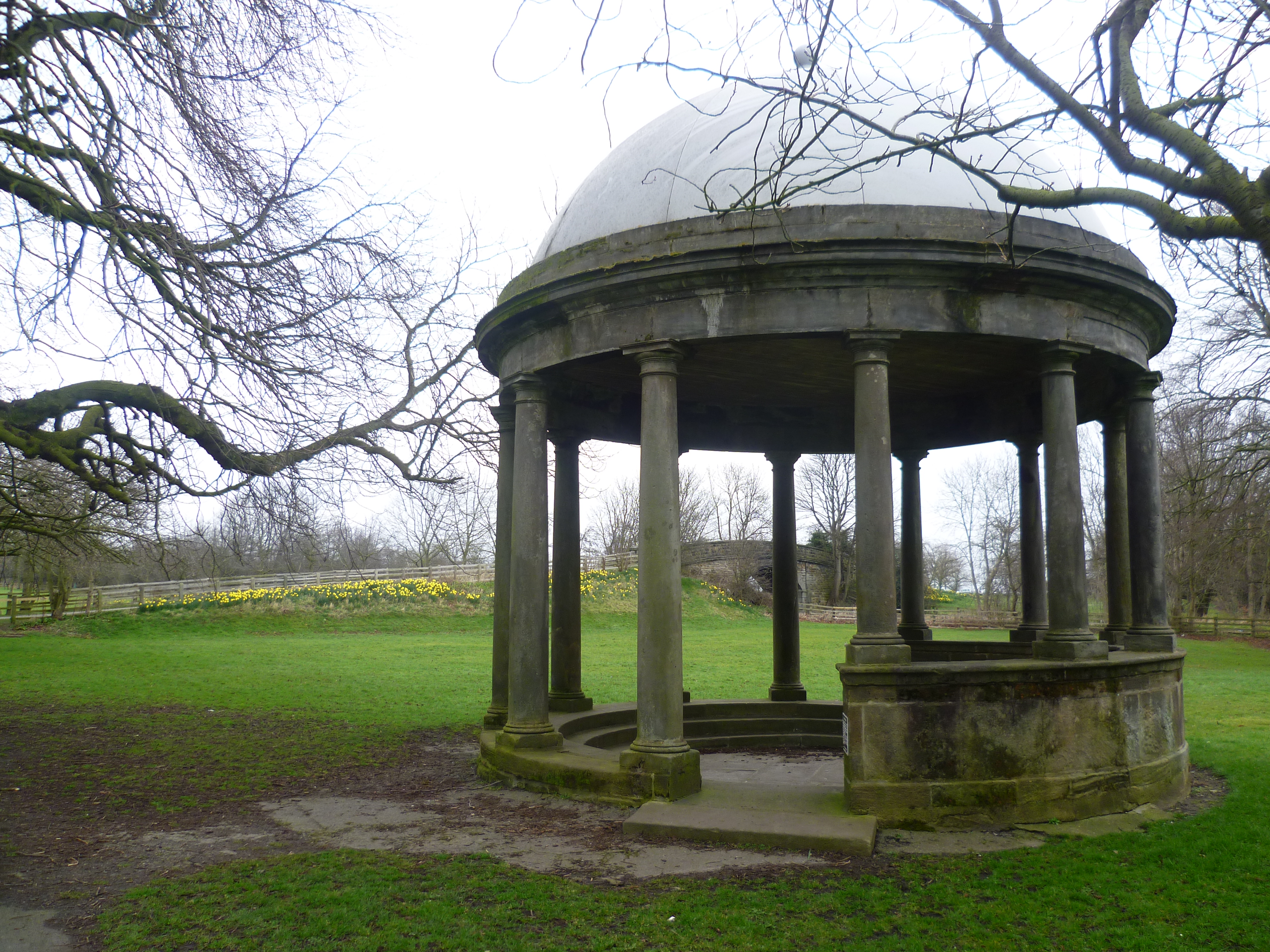
Tewit Well on The Stray

Tewit Well, also known in its early days as "Tuit" or "Tuewhit", is a spa water well, the first chalybeate source discovered in Harrogate, North Yorkshire, England.

== History ==
After marrying Elizabeth Broad, William Slingsby (uncle of Sir William Slingsby) took his new wife on a Grand Tour of Europe. In 1571, Slingsby discovered that water from a well in Knaresborough Forest, now called The Stray, public parkland in Harrogate, possessed similar properties to that at Spa in Belgium. He named the well "Tewit", after a local word for peewit or lapwing, a bird which still frequently flocks on the Stray.

Tewit Well had fewer visitors than the wells in Low Harrogate, or even St John's Well in High Harrogate, because of its distance from Victorian hotels and lodging houses. In 1842, the structure designed by Thomas Chippendale in 1807 enclosing the Royal Pump Room, which sits over the Old Sulphur Well, was replaced by a new structure designed by Isaac Shutt for the Improvement Commissioners. The old structure was then moved to Tewit Well.

== Description ==
The structure still stands on the edge of the Stray, known as Cherry Tree Walk as all the paths are lined on both sides with cherry trees. It is a Grade II* listed building. It carries Harrogate's first Brown Plaque, which was designed in part by Harrogate historian Malcolm Neesam in 1971.

== Local recognition ==
A local brass band, the Tewit Silver Band (and also its youth counterpart), is named after this landmark.

== See also ==
- Grade II* listed buildings in North Yorkshire (district)
- Listed buildings in Harrogate (Stray Ward)
