= The Stray (Harrogate) =

Open parkland in Harrogate, North Yorkshire, England

Coordinates: 53.989°N 1.528°W

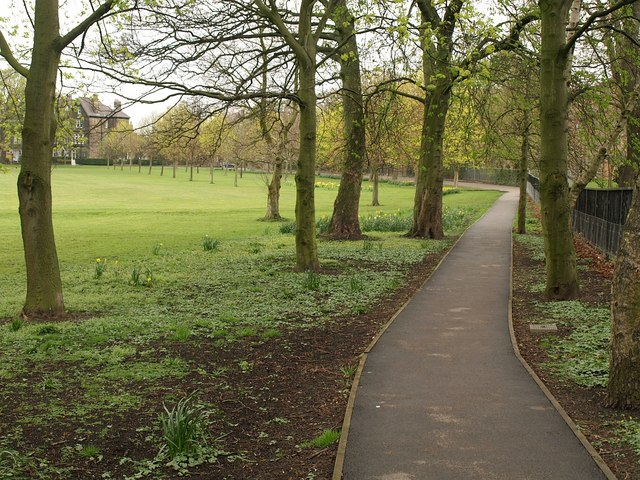
The Stray, which contains large open areas with tree-lined paths

The Stray is a long area of public parkland in the centre of Harrogate, North Yorkshire, England, comprising 200 acres (81 ha) of contiguous open land linking the spa town's curative springs and wells. The contiguous area of land, not all of which is officially designated part of The Stray, forms an approximately U-shaped belt from the Cenotaph on the north west point of the U, down the A61 road, along a broader southern belt of fields, enclosing the building of Church Square, and up to the north east tip of the U at The Granby. The Stray includes the site of Tewit Well, marked by a dome.

== History ==
The area of the Stray was historically part of the Forest of Knaresborough, a royal hunting forest which passed into the hands of John of Gaunt, Duke of Lancaster, in 1369. The forest remained in the hands of the Duchy of Lancaster, which still owns the freehold of the Stray. By the 18th century the forest had long outlived its original purpose, and the spa town of Harrogate was growing within the forest. The Duchy became concerned at illegal encroachments on its land, and considered enclosure of the forest. The duchy commissioned a survey in 1767, which resulted in an inclosure act, the Forest of Knaresborough Inclosure Act 1770 (10 Geo. 3. c. 94 Pr.). The commissioners' subsequent survey recognised the value of the unenclosed land which gave visitors unhindered access to the various mineral springs around Harrogate, and their Great Award of 1778 set aside two hundred acres to be forever unenclosed. The award ensured public right of access to the land linking the wells and dedicating a long stretch of land for those seeking the cure to walk and exercise in.

The award allotted grazing rights (or "gates") on the unenclosed land, so that animals on the 200 acres were free to stray without tether, giving rise to the popular name for the land, the Stray (a term used elsewhere in Yorkshire for unenclosed land, such as at York and Redcar).

Neither the Act of Enclosure nor the Award made any provision for ongoing management of the Stray. In 1841, a new act of Parliament, the Harrogate Improvement Act 1841 (4 & 5 Vict. c. xvi), established a committee of Stray gate owners, but in practice this enabled the gate owners to generate income from renting parts of the Stray for purposes other than grazing animals. In 1884, Harrogate was incorporated as a municipal borough, and the new corporation negotiated the purchase of the gates. A further act of Parliament, the Harrogate Corporation Act 1893 (56 & 57 Vict. c. ccix) required the corporation to maintain the Stray as a public open space.

Harrogate Stray Act 1985
- Act of Parliament
- Parliament of the United Kingdom
- Long title: An Act to re-enact with amendments certain local enactments in force within the borough of Harrogate; to confer further powers on the Council of the Borough of Harrogate with respect to the management of the Stray; and for other purposes.
- Citation: 1985 c. xxii

Dates
- Royal assent: 16 July 1985

Other legislation
- Repeals/revokes: Forest of Knaresborough (Yorkshire) Inclosure Act 1770; Harrogate Improvement Act 1841; Harrogate Waterworks Act 1846; Harrogate Waterworks Act 1869; Harrogate Corporation (Waterworks Transfer) Act 1897; Ripon Corporation Act 1901; Harrogate Corporation Act 1901; Harrogate Water Act 1903; Harrogate Corporation Water Act 1911; Harrogate Corporation Act 1924

Status: Current legislation

Text of statute as originally enacted

In 1932, the corporation's action in planting large formal areas planted with shrubs provoked opposition, and led in 1933 to the formation of the Stray Defence Association. Another act of Parliament, the Harrogate Stray Act 1985 (c. xxii), made the new Harrogate Borough Council the protector of the Stray, and permitted the use of up to 8.5 acres (3.4 ha) of the Stray for spectator events. A variation was granted for the Tour de France in 2014, but proposals in 2016 to relax the restrictions permanently met opposition and were abandoned.

The Stray is traditionally the site of parades and civic events. For example, at the Golden Jubilee of Queen Victoria in 1887 the people of Harrogate roasted an ox for the occasion and drank 500 imperial gallons (2,300 L; 600 US gal) of beer. During World War II trenches were dug on The Stray in fear that German planes might use the open land as a runway.
