= Countryside (disambiguation) =

Countryside refers to a rural area.

Countryside or countrysides may also refer to:

== Organizations in the United Kingdom ==
- Countryside Agency
- Countryside Alliance
- Countryside Commission
- Countryside Council for Wales
- Countryside Live, an event at the Great Yorkshire Showground
- Countryside Party (UK)
- Countryside Stewardship Scheme

== Places in the United States ==
- Countryside, Illinois
- Countryside, Kansas
- Countryside, Virginia
- Countryside High School, Clearwater, Florida
- Tait–Ervin House or Countryside, a plantation near Camden, Alabama

== Other uses ==
- Countryside (Åland), a sub-region of Finland
- Countrysides (album), by Cracker
- Countrysides, an EP by Jonah Matranga and Mikee J Reds
- "Countryside", a song by Florida Georgia Line from Life Rolls On, 2021
