= Countryside Live =

Countryside Live is the sister event of the annual farming and rural showcase, the Great Yorkshire Show. It is held during October, at the Great Yorkshire Showground in the town of Harrogate, England. The public two-day event is designed to act as a shop window for the farming industry. The show has been organised by the Yorkshire Agricultural Society every year since it was first held in 2001.

There are competitive classes for cattle, sheep, poultry, pigeons, horses, ponies, and pigs. The region's Young Farmers' Club organises a Tug of War championship and stock-judging competitions. The site has local food and drink stands.

== History ==
Countryside Live began in 2001 and has been held annually since then. The first event was launched after the outbreak of foot-and-mouth disease. It has 400 entries in the sheep and cattle classes.

In 2008, equine classes were added to the program. Demonstrations of horsemanship and show jumping master classes are given by ex-Olympic equestrian Graham Fletcher and his wife, Tina, an international show jumper. The 2009 show, held on 24 and 25 October, introduced several new competitive classes. These included farriery, classes for both modern and traditional breeds of pigs, and classes for novice horse riders.

In 2010, a record crowd of 10,221 visitors attended the event. Overall, there were 226 entries in the equine section. The two-day event took place on 23 and 24 October 2010.

In 2011, the show hosted the "Festival of British Fruit", organised by The Marden Fruit Society of Kent. The annual event is held in a different location each year. More than 25 varieties of apples and nine varieties of pears were on display, and visitors were encouraged to vote for their favourite. The final selection of "Britain's Tastiest Apple" is made by a panel of experts. Graham and Tina Fletcher judged the yearly hunt for a young show-jumping star, and the environmental organisation The Conservation Volunteers handed a tiny tree to the show attendants. Around 10,700 people attended the performance.

Countryside Live celebrated its tenth annual anniversary in 2012, when the show was attended by 12,601 visitors. A number of new events were added to the programme. These included the final of the Northern Show Cross horse-riding event. The junior novice event was won by a 14-year-old girl from Scarborough, while the senior novice event was won by a 74-year-old man from Monk Fryston. The event consists of traditional show jumping and cross-country jumps. Other first-time events at the show included a mountain biking demonstration, an appearance by Carol and Phillip Mellin and their sheepdog Jess, from the ITV television programme The Dales; and the Knaresborough Horticultural Society's Flower and Vegetable show. In addition, the Rare Breeds Survival Trust attended the show for the first time. There were more than 3,000 entries in the sheep and cattle classes.

The 11th annual event was held on 19 and 20 October 2013, with the return of the Northern Show Cross Final as well as the addition of the new Private Driving Arena Trials.
