= Harrogate (Brunswick) railway station =

Disused railway station in North Yorkshire, England

Harrogate (Brunswick)
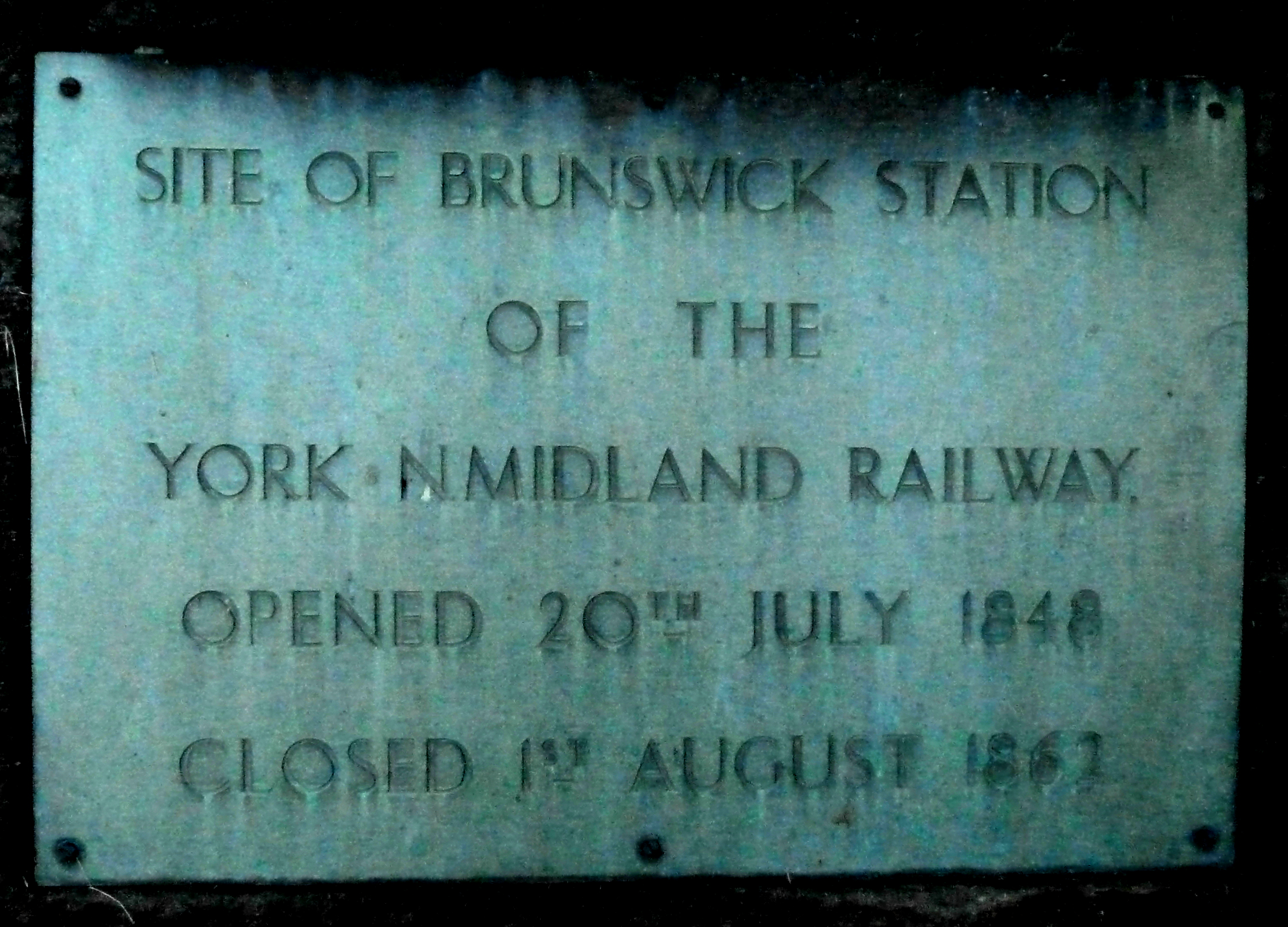
- Plaque marking the site of Harrogate Brunswick Railway Station

General information
- Location: Harrogate, North Yorkshire; England
- Coordinates: 53.9865°N 1.5401°W
- Grid reference: SE302545
- Platforms: 1

Other information
- Status: Disused

History
- Original company: York and North Midland Railway
- Pre-grouping: York and North Midland Railway

Key dates
- 20 July 1848: Opened
- 1 August 1862: Closed
Location

Harrogate (Brunswick) railway station served the town of Harrogate, North Yorkshire, England from 1848 to 1862 on the Leeds and Thirsk Railway.

== History ==
York and North Midland Railway (Harrogate Station) Act 1847
- Act of Parliament
- Parliament of the United Kingdom
- Long title: An Act for enabling the York and North Midland Railway Company to extend the Line of their Harrogate Branch Railway, and make a Station at Harrogate.
- Citation: 10 & 11 Vict. c. cxl

Dates
- Royal assent: 9 July 1847

Text of statute as originally enacted

The station, named after the nearby Brunswick Hotel, opened on 20 July 1848 by the Leeds and Thirsk Railway. The station was situated on the north side of Trinity Road, where Trinity Methodist Church now stands. There were two sidings to the west, one serving a small engine shed. When the North Eastern Railway opened the current Harrogate station, this station was considered obsolete and closed on 1 August 1862; it was going to be retained for goods traffic but this idea was short-lived.

The tunnel which formerly served the station still exists, running from a branch just north of Hornbeam Park railway station up toward St Mark's Church, Harrogate. The tunnel was used as an air raid shelter during World War II, and steps leading up to the surface were constructed at the now closed north end of the tunnel, near St Mark's Road.

== Plaque ==
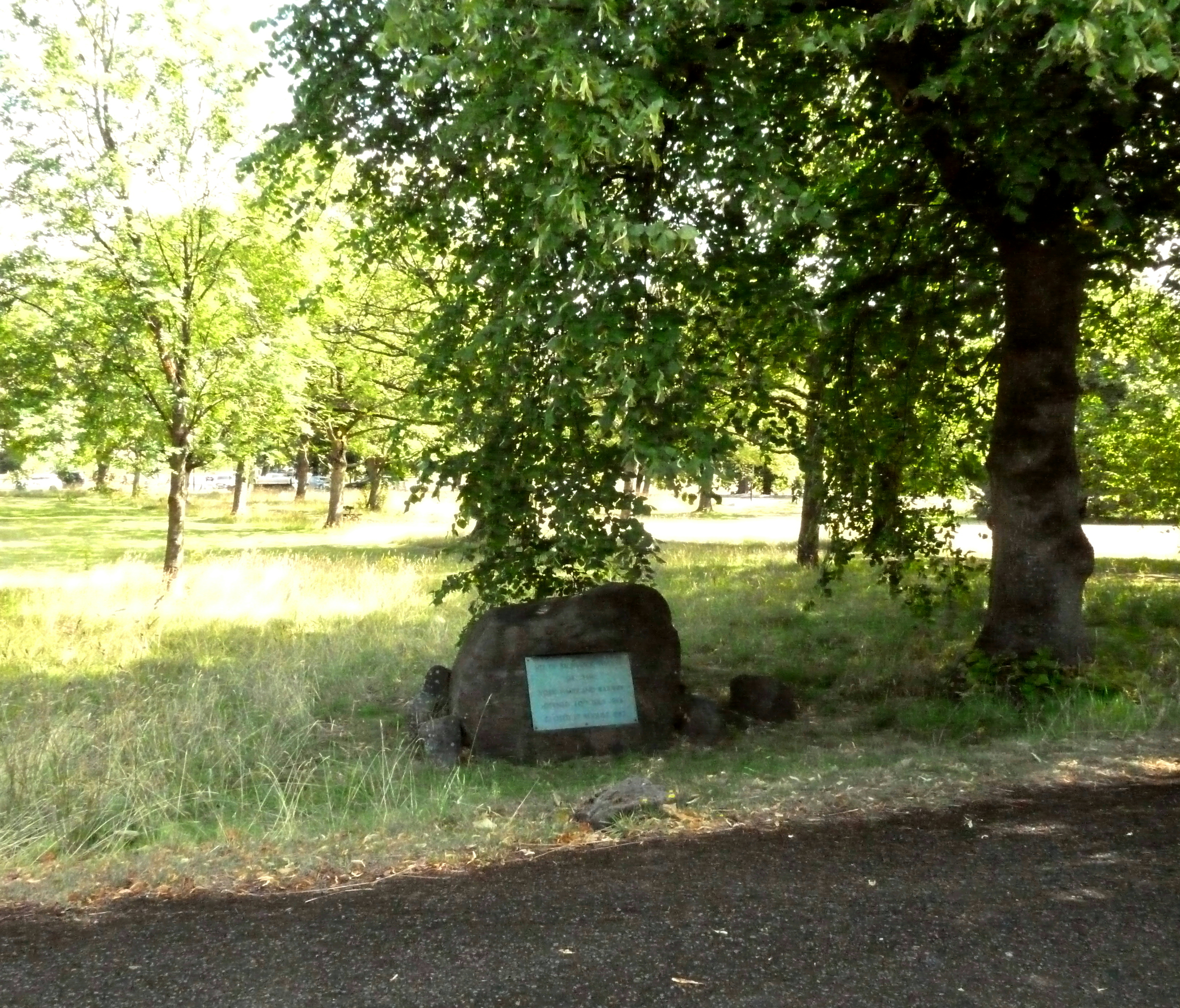
Site of the plaque, set in stone

During a snowstorm exacerbated by strong winds in December 1949, mayor Mary Fisher unveiled a plaque on The Stray near the original site of Brunswick station. The plaque commemorates the centenary of the station, and the inscription says: "Site of Brunswick station of the York N. Midland Railway. Opened 20th July 1848, closed 1st August 1861".

Preceding station	Historical railways	Following station
Harrogate	Leeds and Thirsk Railway	Terminus
