= Yorkshire Agricultural Society =

Agricultural society based in Harrogate, North Yorkshire, England

The old badge, used by the society until 2019

Yorkshire Agricultural Society is a charity based at the Great Yorkshire Showground, Harrogate, North Yorkshire, England. The society is best known as the organiser of the two annual country events, the Great Yorkshire Show and the Countryside Live. It is committed to working for the countryside.

The Society was formed in 1837 by a group of agriculturalists at a meeting in York. Its main objective is to promote farming and rural life, particularly in the North of England. The shows are held in July and October respectively, and are shop windows for the farming industry as well as enjoyable days out.

Improvements in farming are encouraged through grants which fund agriculture based research at a number of North of England universities. It also has an active education department which promotes knowledge amongst young people of the important role British farmers play in producing food.

Each year almost £1 million is provided in support of farming and rural based initiatives. In particular, the Society’s Growing Routes programme is dedicated to encouraging young people to develop rural based businesses.
