= Mary Fisher (mayor) =

English politician (1884–1972)

Mary Fisher MBE JP
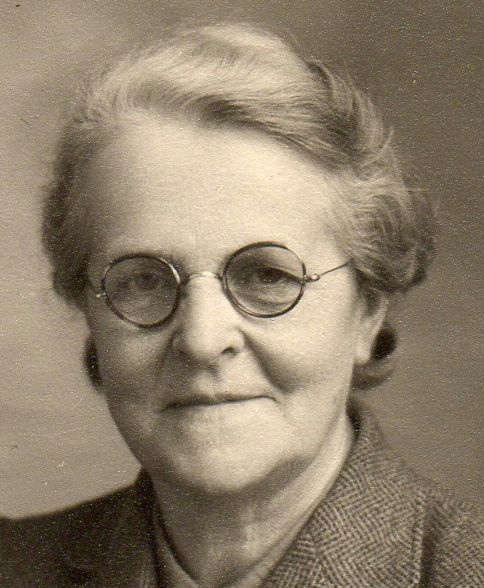
- Fisher, c. 1934
- Born: Mary Stott; 6 June 1884; Kirby Hill, Harrogate, West Riding of Yorkshire, England
- Died: 28 February 1972 (aged 87); Harrogate, England
- Occupations: Justice of the peace; mayor of Harrogate 1949
- Years active: 1912–1972
- Political party: Conservative
- Spouse: Frank Fisher (m. 1913; died 1938)
- Children: 2

Mary Fisher MBE JP (née Stott; 6 June 1884 – 28 February 1972) was an English charity worker and politician. She was a Conservative councillor, and justice of the peace who became the first woman mayor of Harrogate, in the North Riding of Yorkshire, England, and devoted 60 years of her life to public service.

Fisher introduced the Girl Guides movement to Harrogate, and involved herself with education, hospital visiting and the poor. She gave her support to the work of Soroptimist International, the British Deaf Association and the Royal National Lifeboat Institution (RNLI). She was a justice of the peace and a Conservative councillor. Along with other councillors she co-founded a care home which was named after her. Her committee duties included the local Unemployment Assistance committee and, during the Second World War, the war savings committee and the local Ministry of Information committee. She oversaw the hosting in Harrogate of twenty distressed children from war-torn Austria, and was interviewed by Richard Dimbleby in the Down Your Way radio programme.

Although referred to in a patronising manner by a group of journalists, Fisher oversaw the successful move of the Great Yorkshire Show to a permanent venue in Harrogate. She presided over Yorkshire's first arena stage production at the Royal Hall, Harrogate. In recognition of her public service work, she was appointed Member of the Order of the British Empire (MBE) in the 1958 Birthday Honours. She was made an honorary freeman of the borough of Harrogate, and was elected to the Roll of Honorary Aldermen of Harrogate. In 2025 a brown plaque was erected in Harrogate to commemorate Fisher's work.

== Background ==
Fisher's maternal grandfather was Lister Holmes, (Note: Lister Holmes (born Great Timble c.1830). Deaths Mar 1911 Holmes Lister 81 Wharfedale 9a 93.) a farmer of 236 acres (96 ha) in Yorkshire. Her parents were Swires Stott, (Note: Swires Stott (Bedale 1856 – 11 May 1929), sometimes misread as "Swiers", "Swyers" or Siviers. GRO index: Births Dec 1856 Stott Swyers Bedale 9d 428. Deaths Jun 1929 Stott Swires 73 Wharfedale 9a 184. See: File:Swires Stott (1).jpg and File:Swires Stott (2).jpg.) a groom, gardener and innkeeper, and Jane Stott née Holmes, (Note: Jane Stott (Fewston circa 1860 – 31 December 1931). GRO index: Births Dec 1859 Holmes Jane Otley 9a 115. Marriages Jun 1881 Holmes Jane and Stott Siviers. Wharfedale 9a 225. Deaths Mar 1932 Stott Jane 72 Knaresbro' 9a 142) who had three sons and two daughters. The family was living in Grove Park Walk, Skipton Road, Harrogate, by 1901.

Mary Stott, the second of five siblings, was born in Kirby Hill near Boroughbridge. (Note: Mary Fisher née Stott (Kirby Hill 6 June 1884 – Harrogate 28 February 1972). GRO index: Births Sep 1884 Stott Mary Gt. Ouseburn 9a 81. Deaths Mar 1972 Fisher Mary 6 Je 1884 Claro 2c 322. Frank and Mary Fisher are buried at Stonefall Cemetery, Harrogate, in plot 17, no.5583.) In 1913 she married butcher Frank Fisher, (Note: Frank Fisher (Skelmanthorpe 1878 – Harrogate 8 October 1938). GRO index: Births Sep 1878 Fisher Frank Huddersfield 9a 316. Marriages Mar 1913 Stott Mary and Fisher Frank. Knaresbro 9a 167. Deaths Dec 1938 Fisher Frank 60 Knaresbro' 9a 116. Probate London 3 February 1939.) who ran a shop in Commercial Street, Harrogate, and they had a home not far from the business, at 1 Mount Parade. They had two children: their son was Arthur Lister Fisher, (Note: Arthur Lister Fisher (1914 – Harrogate 23 November 1966). GRO index: Births Jun 1914 Fisher Arthur L. Mother Stott. Knaresbro 9a 189. Marriages Jun 1946 Colman Daphne May and Fisher Frank Lister. Surrey N.W 2a 1232. Deaths Dec 1966 Fisher Arthur L. 52 Claro 2C 101. Probate Wakefield 18 January 1967.) a butcher and special constable, and their daughter was Clara Colman née Fisher, (Note: Clara Colman nee Fisher (born Knaresborough 1916). GRO index: Births Mar 1916 Fisher Clara. Mother Stott. Knaresbro 9a 161. Marriages Jun 1942 Fisher Clara and Colman Laurence T. Knaresbro' 9a 268. Deaths Jun 1961 Colman Clara 45 Surrey N.W 5g 607) a butcher's clerk before she married. From 1938 when her husband died, Fisher's son Arthur ran the family's butcher shop in Commercial Street, Harrogate, with the help of his mother and sister. (Note: After her husband died in 1938, Fisher possibly served in the family butcher's shop as butcher's clerk after her daughter Clara married. However Arthur and Clara died in the 1960s, and it is unknown whether the family retained any connection with the shop after 1966.) Mary and Frank Fisher had five grandchildren. Fisher was later to be described by the Yorkshire Post as "genial and petite".

When Fisher died her address was 20 Ripon Road. Her death made the front page of the Harrogate Herald. She was buried at Stonefall Cemetery, Harrogate, and she left £8,663 (equivalent to £102,602.53 in 2025).

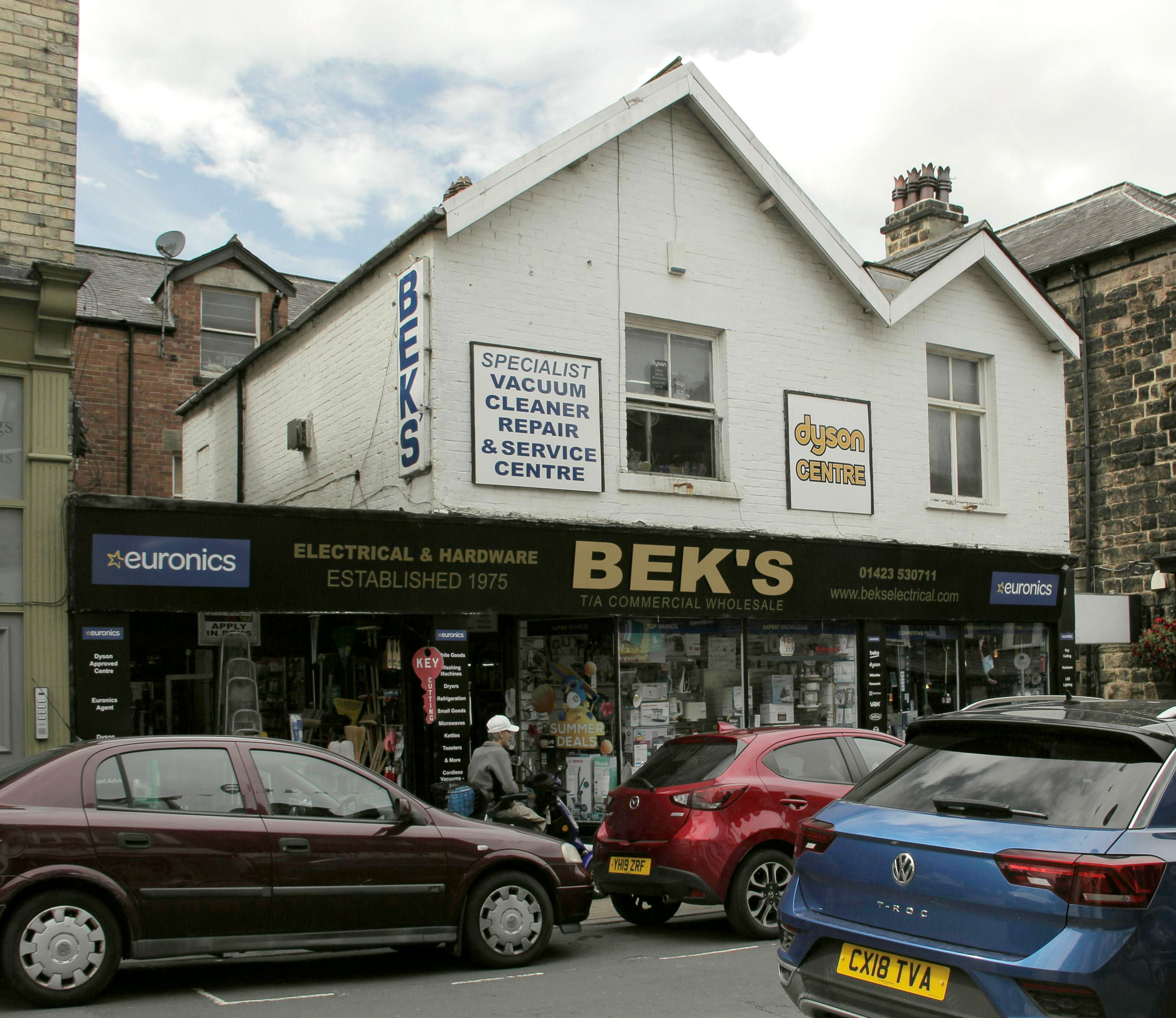
Site of Fisher's butcher shop

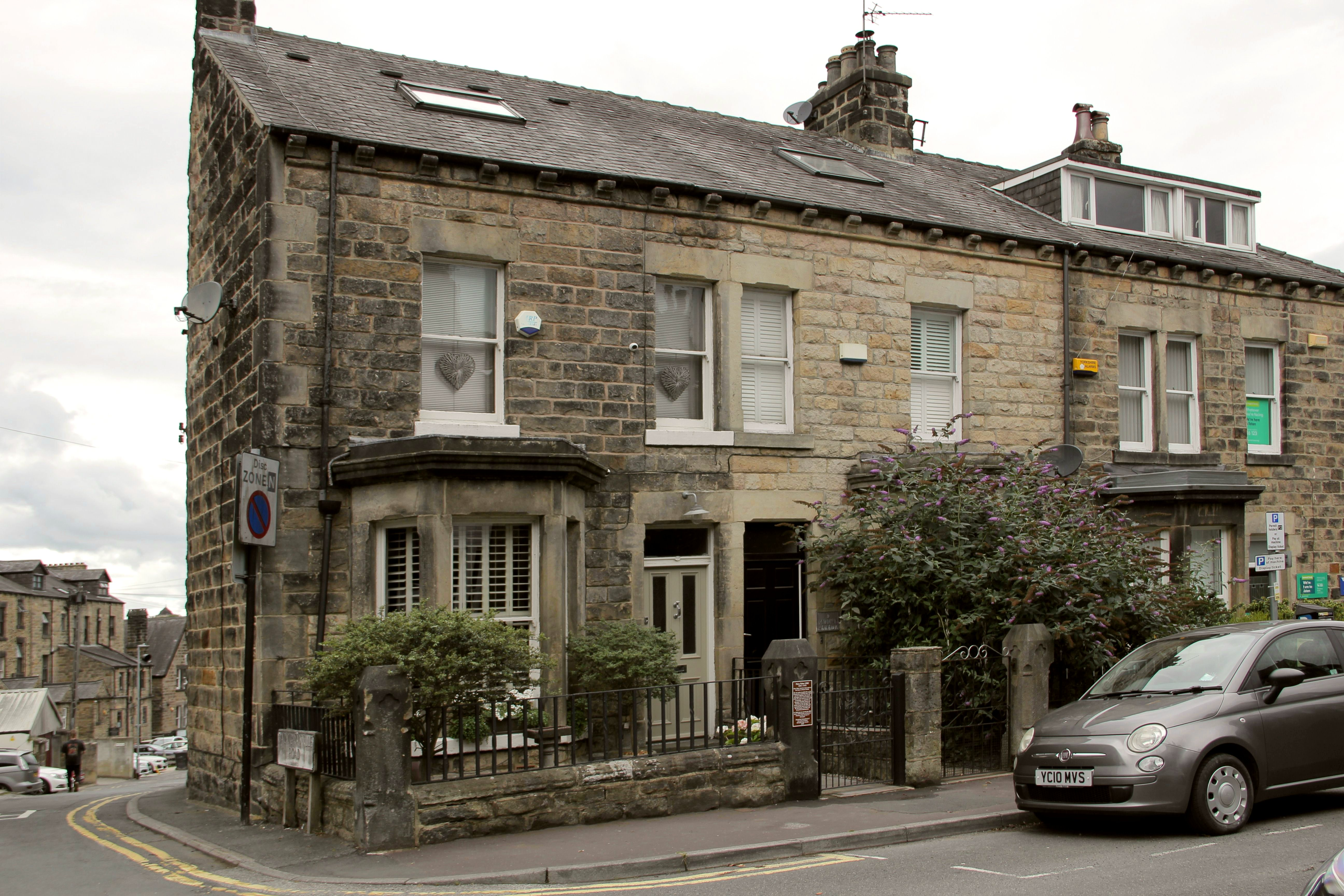
Fisher's terrace house

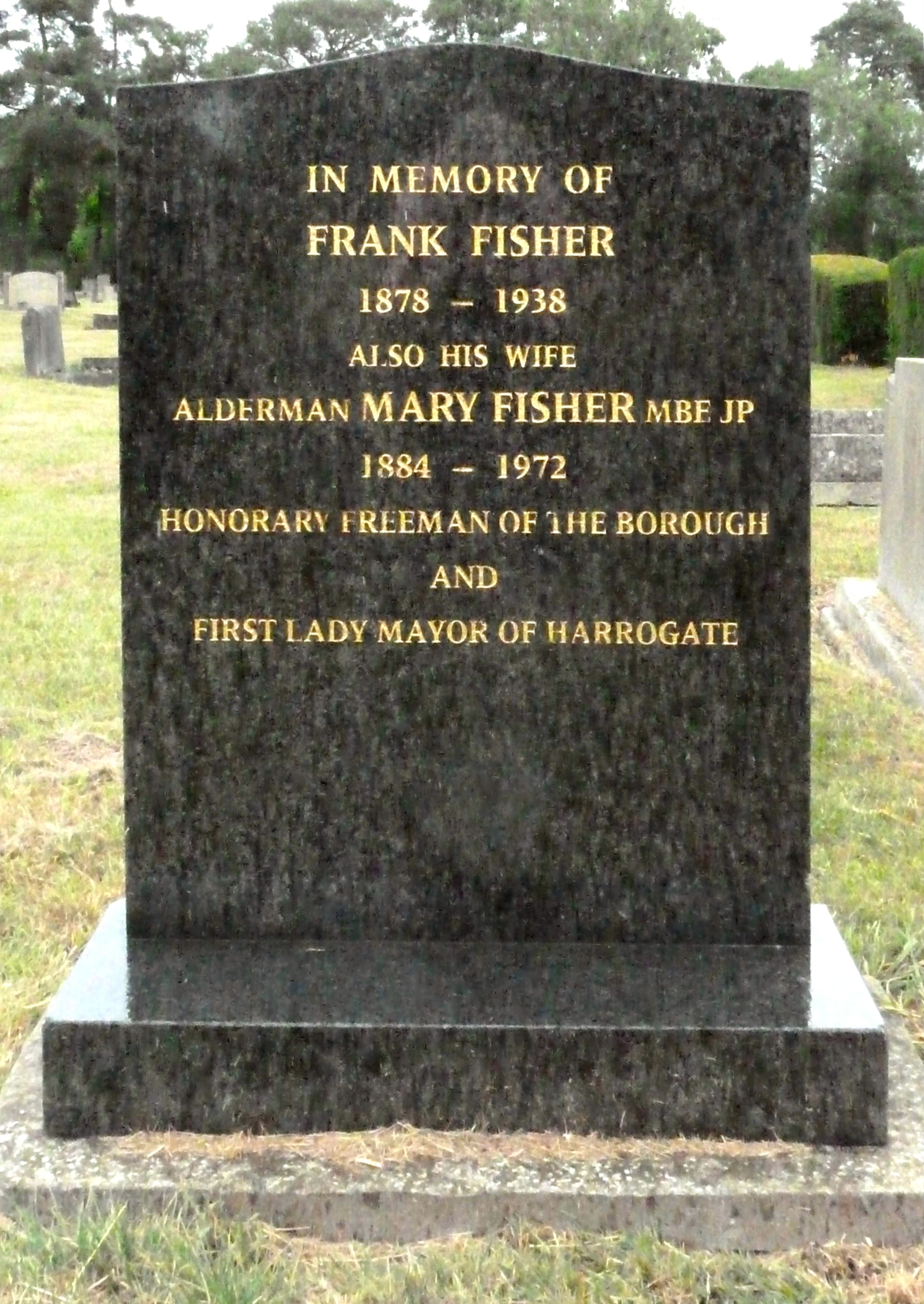
Fisher's gravestone

== Public service ==
=== Early public service ===
The Harrogate Herald said that Fisher "devoted more than 60 years of her life to public and social service, and who was in the tributes paid to her at the Freedom ceremony described as one of the town's most beloved citizens".

In the 1920s, Fisher was one of the persons who founded the Girl Guides movement in Harrogate. The Harrogate Herald said that "her love for children went on to express itself in her great many years of association with education". In her early years of public service she was involved with the "deaf, dumb and blind", (Note: Up to the middle of the 20th century in the United Kingdom, the American pejorative usage of the word, "dumb" was not current. "Dumb" still retained its original meaning of "not speaking".) and hospital visiting, and "interested herself in the work of the guardians of the poor". During her later life she assisted in support of Soroptimist International, the British Deaf Association and the Royal National Lifeboat Institution (RNLI).

From 1939 Fisher served as a magistrate, or justice of the peace. In 1943 she became a justice of the juvenile court. In the same year she was elected Conservative councillor for Harrogate's West Ward, and in 1945 West Central Ward. She served on the local Unemployment Assistance committee, besides various council committees. During the Second World War she served on the war savings committee and the local Ministry of Information committee.

A care home for dementia sufferers at 68 Cold Bath Road, Harrogate, was named for her as Mary Fisher House, after she and other councillors founded it in 1946. However, by 2022 the care home was in special measures after an inspection by the Care Quality Commission. (Note: Mary Fisher House closed. It reopened in 2023 at the same address, as Sapphire Court (see: Sapphire Court)..)

=== Mayoral duties in 1949 ===
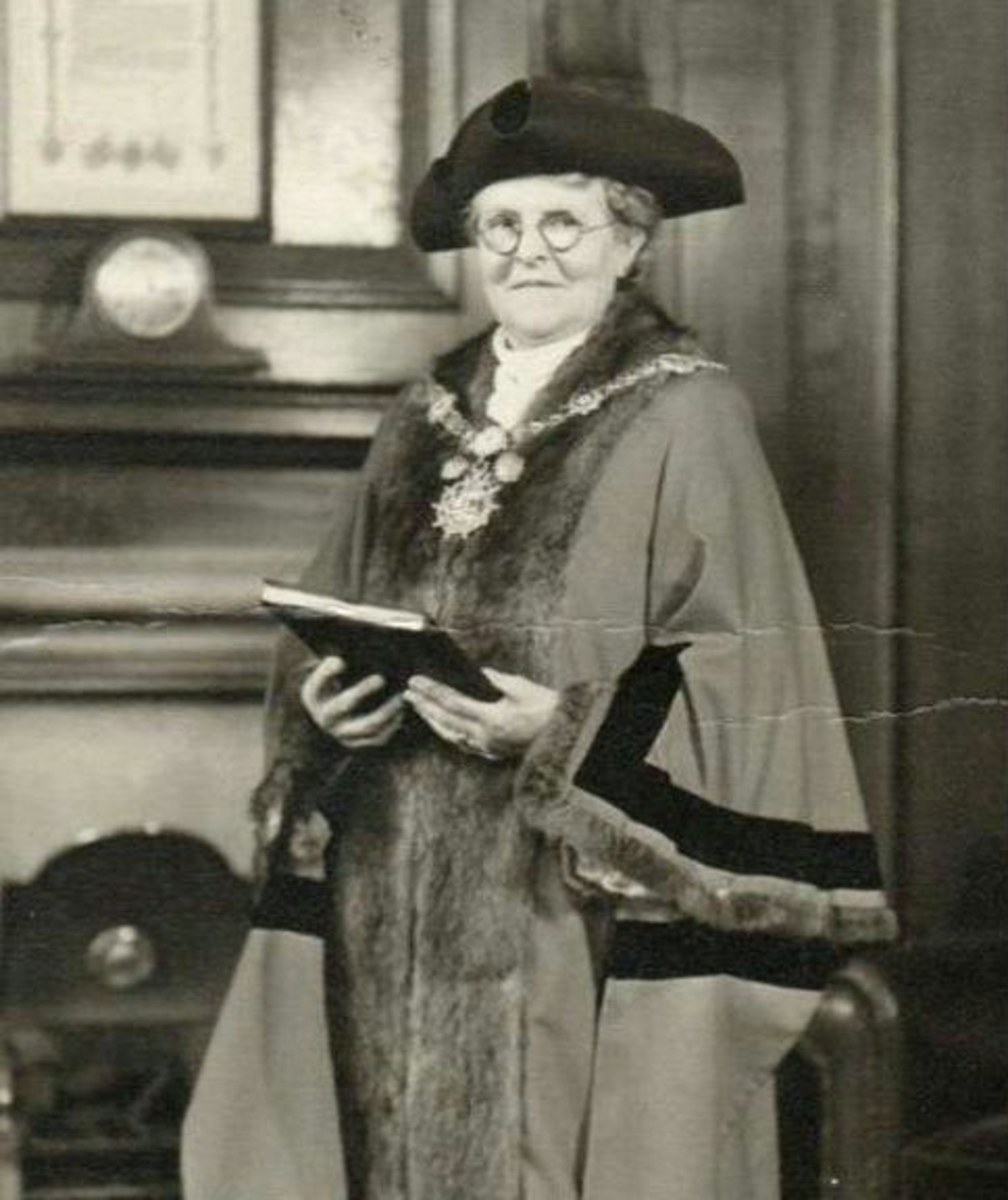
Fisher as mayor, 1949

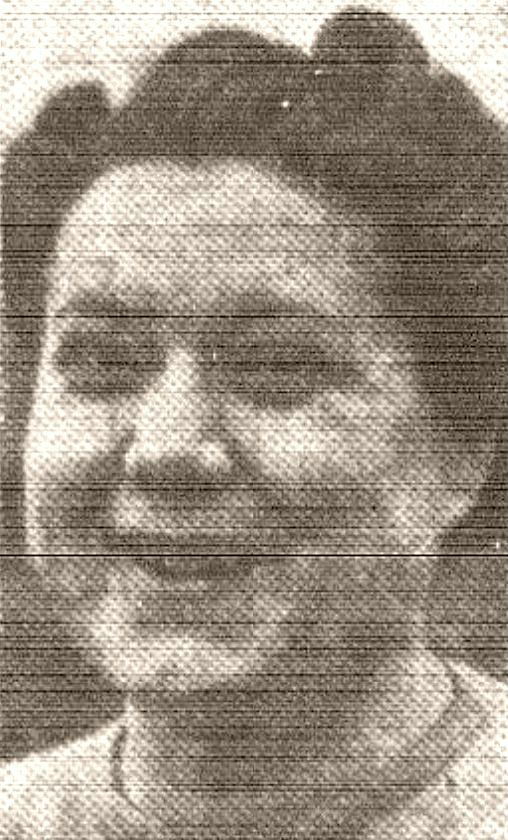
Mayoress K.M. Niner

On 7 February 1949, Fisher accepted Harrogate Council's invitation to become its first female mayor. The Yorkshire Evening Post said that her election was "enthusiastically acclaimed by an audience among whom women were predominant". Fisher said: "I feel that this is not only an honour to myself, but an honour to the women of Harrogate, who have done such splendid work in so many ways and for so many years". On 13 June 1949 Harrogate Council saw a woman in the mayoral chair for the first time, at its monthly meeting. Her niece Kathleen Mary Niner was her mayoress, and they were officially installed in May. As mayor she appeared in an episode of Down Your Way, a radio series in which Richard Dimbleby interviewed her. She also hosted twenty distressed children from war-torn Austria, writing to the local newspaper and begging for donations of clothing for the children.

By June, the British Medical Association's conference officials were still confused by having to address Fisher formally as "Mr Mayor". At a Harrogate conference, the Chartered Institute of Journalists described Fisher and her lady mayoress in a patronising manner, and the local papers followed suit:

The grey-haired, spectacled Mayor (Mrs. Mary Fisher) and her niece, the chubby-faced Mayoress (Mrs. Kathleen Mary Niner), became great favourites with the conference. They were personifications of a homely Yorkshire welcome. A London delegate described them as a "couple of dears".

On 22 June 1949, she announced "a grand thing for the town", namely that the previously itinerant Great Yorkshire Show would henceforth be given a permanent venue in Harrogate. The Bradford Observer said, "Hotel proprietors, civic leaders, and tradespeople were all enthusiastic over the decision which was taken by the council of the show in York". The show continued to be successful in its Harrogate venue, and by 2023 was being described by the Harrogate Advertiser as "one of the best agricultural shows in the United Kingdom". In June 1949 at the Royal Hall, Harrogate, Fisher presided over Yorkshire's first arena stage production, in which the audience surrounded the players.

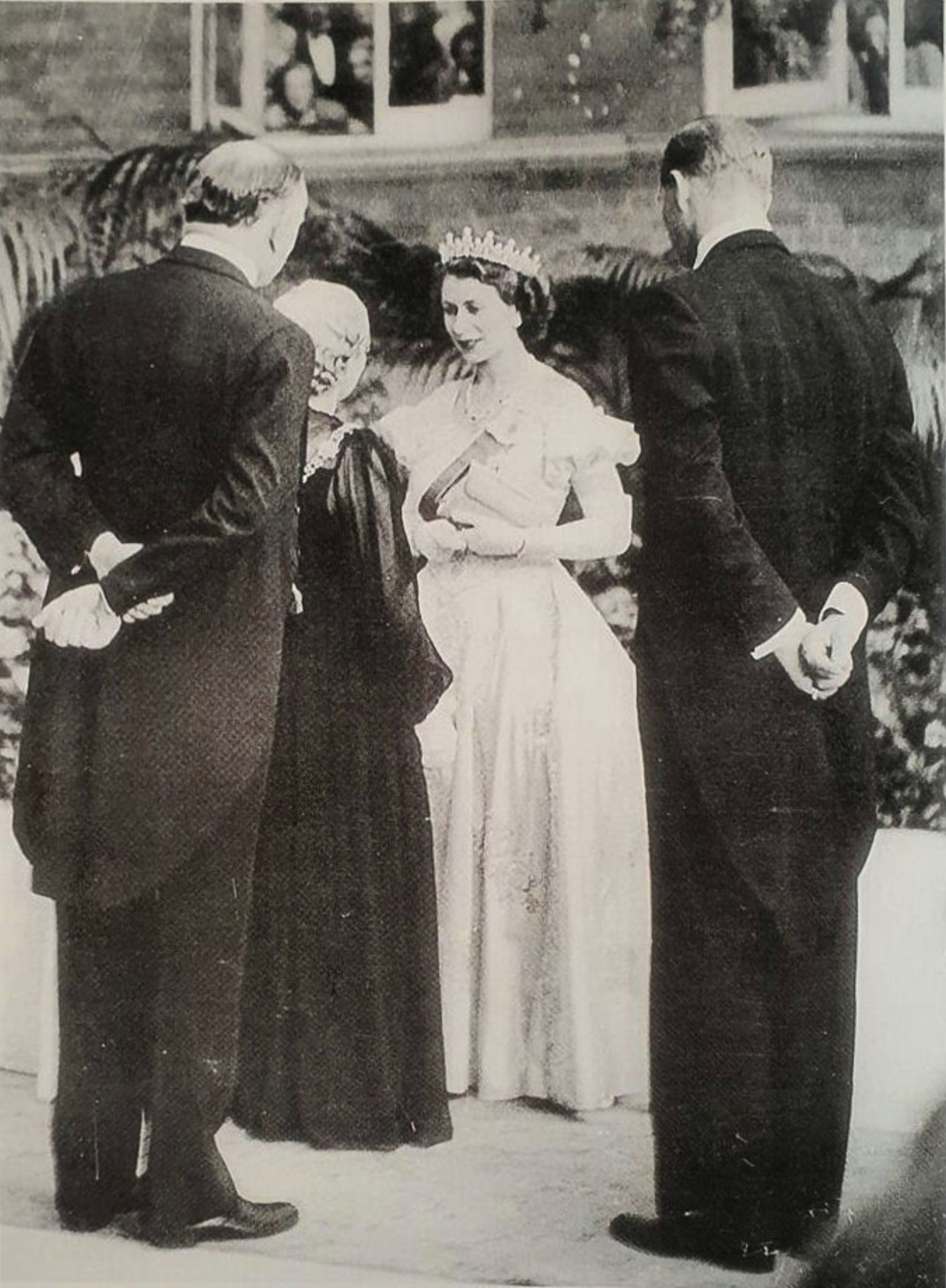
Fisher meets Princess Elizabeth, 1949

When Princess Elizabeth and Prince Philip visited the West Riding of Yorkshire for a royal tour in the summer of 1949, Fisher asked the Harrogate householders along the processional route to decorate their houses as a welcome gesture. The chairman of West Riding County Council invited the royal couple to dinner at the Majestic Hotel, Harrogate where Fisher, in a black georgette dress and mayoral chain of office, met them. In June 1949 Fisher was invited by the Lord Mayor of London to attend a London meeting about the projected 1951 Festival of All Arts, in response to a suggestion that Harrogate should provide its own concurrent event referencing the festival.

There were some dark moments when, for example, in June 1949 Fisher attended a radiographers' conference in which the speaker voiced the contemporary fear of a World War III and the atomic bomb. In August 1949, Fisher was involved in some controversy, when she objected to a noisy greyhound racetrack being opened by a local window cleaner in peaceful Harrogate. She condemned the proposals as "not quite the right thing for Harrogate". However the position of mayor had some light-hearted moments, for example when in August 1949 Fisher presented the prizes for the Yorkshire beauty queen competition at the Royal Baths, Harrogate, and two of the top three finalists were Harrogate women. It was the mayor's job to crown the new beauty queen in September of that year, when the Bradford Observer reported: "One of the most attractive scenes [of the gala] was the crowning by the mayor (councillor Mrs Mary Fisher) of the Yorkshire Beauty Queen". Another pleasant event for Fisher and her mayoress was an invitation to attend the wedding of the Earl of Harewood and Marion Stein on 29 September at St Mark's, Mayfair and the reception at St James' Palace, which they attended alongside Frederick Ashton, John Barbirolli, Benjamin Britten and Douglas Fairbanks Jr.

There was more controversy in October, when the Convocation of York and the Council of Women's conference in Harrogate separately pronounced upon or debated the unprecedented "sale of birth control requisites in slot machines" in Yorkshire. Fisher welcomed the women delegates to their conference, but in York the convocation recorded its "abhorrence of the use of automatic machines for the indiscriminate sale of birth control requisites". The women's conference did, however, pass a resolution to raise the old age pension from £1 (equivalent to £30.55 in 2025) a week to 26 shillings (equivalent to £39.72 in 2025).

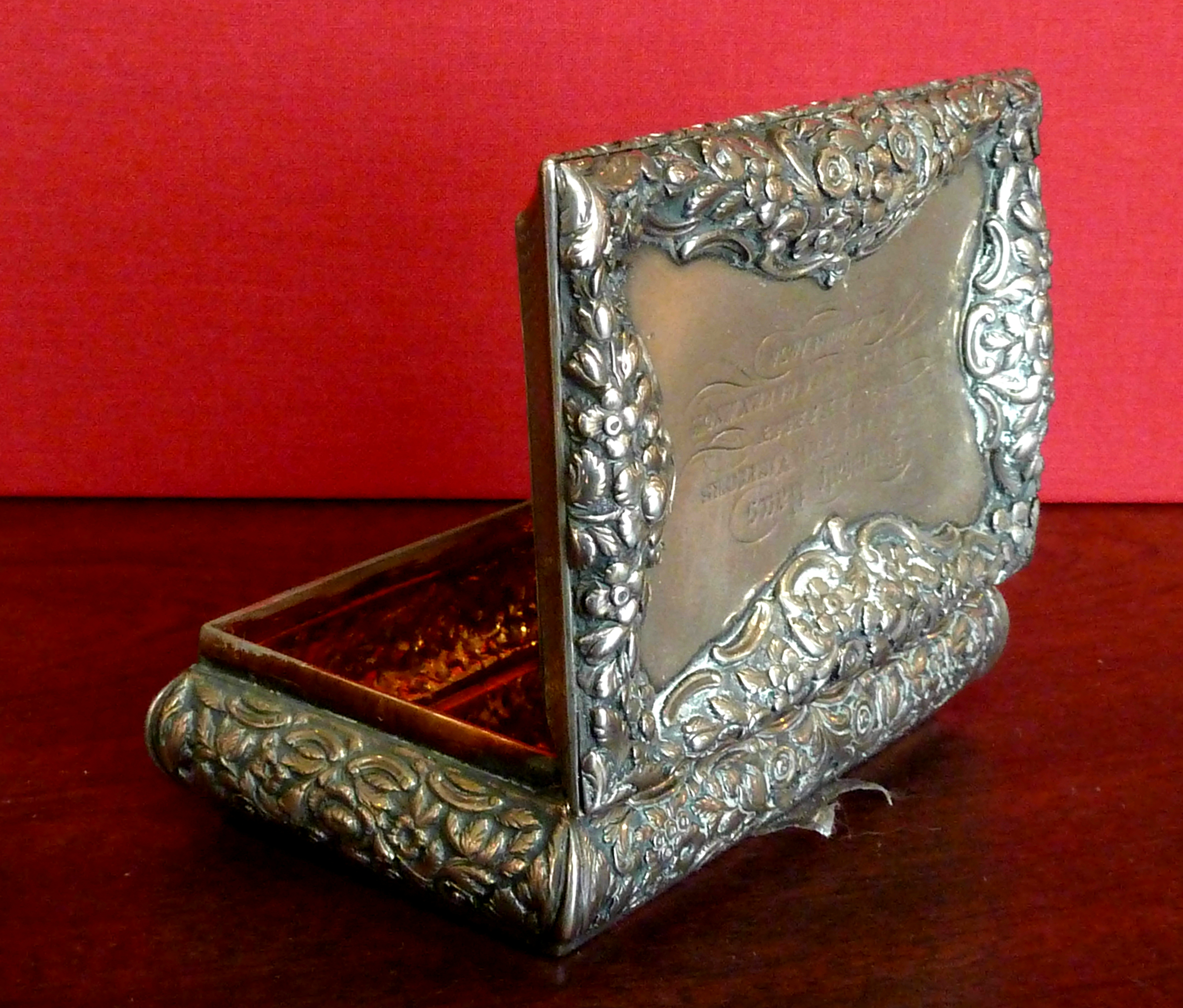
1838 snuffbox

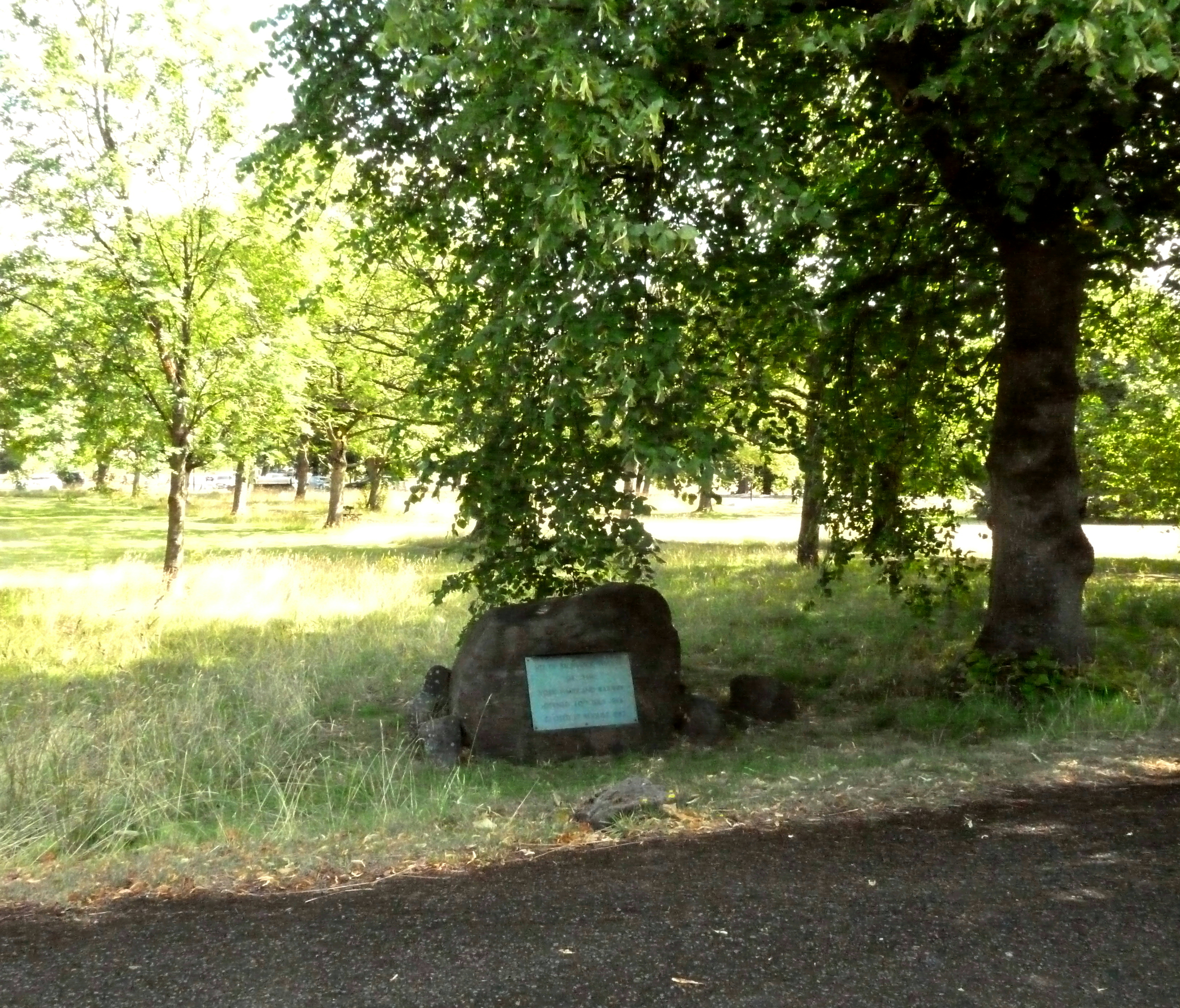
Brunswick railway plaque

Fisher accepted a gift on behalf of Harrogate when in November 1949 a Harrogate dealer received from the South of England a chased, solid silver snuffbox measuring 3.5 by 2.5 inches (8.9 by 6.4 cm), with the inscription, "Harrogate Races. The gift of the Visitors. Won by Peggy, the property of F. Green esquire, 29th August 1838". Twelve prominent Harrogate antique dealers agreed that as a significant historical artefact of Harrogate's past, "its rightful place was in the mayor's parlour". One of their number, A.A. Greenwood, said "It is unique, and a beautiful piece of workmanship". On 13 December it was presented to Fisher for the town. The box remains today in Harrogate Council's collection. In December 1949, it was Fisher, in high winds and a snowstorm on The Stray, who unveiled a plaque commemorating the centenary of the former Brunswick railway station. The station stood on a site near the plaque between 1848 and 1862, and was replaced by Harrogate railway station in the town centre. At the end of 1949 during her mayoral year, Fisher and her mayoress attended a carnival ball at the Royal Hall, while the bells of St Mary's Church rang out for the start of 1950.

=== Subsequent public service ===
In February 1950, Fisher had the use of a "luxurious" Rolls-Royce car, which she used to transport the Empire Games gold medallist Len Eyre on his triumphal return home. After Eyre stepped into Harrogate railway station from the train to meet Fisher and a crowd of well-wishers, Fisher, Eyre, Eyre's wife and the Rolls made a triumphal entry into Eyre's home village of Beckwithshaw, while the bells of St Michael and All Angels rang and the villagers cheered. In the same month, Fisher and her mayoress welcomed eighteen mayors and other civic representatives to Harrogate's first post-war civic ball at the Royal Hall. The ball included eight hundred guests. The Yorkshire Post reported: "Not since Princess Elizabeth and the Duke of Edinburgh came to Harrogate [in summer 1949] has such a large scale civic function been arranged for the spa". A striking event at that meeting was, as described by the Yorkshire Post, a "grand march of the guests round the ballroom floor – a ceremonial which greatly impressed [Fisher] when she attended a civic function in Huddersfield recently".

In April 1950, Fisher oversaw Harrogate's involvement in a radio competition called Top Town. This was a light-hearted series in which various local towns competed to provide fifteen minutes of the best amateur entertainment. Fisher and the mayor of Huddersfield tossed a coin for the first spot. Huddersfield won both the toss and the match. Fisher was succeeded as mayor by alderman C.E. Whiteley, a member of the Liberal Party. Fisher was elected as the first female alderman of Harrogate Council in 1954.

== Institutions ==
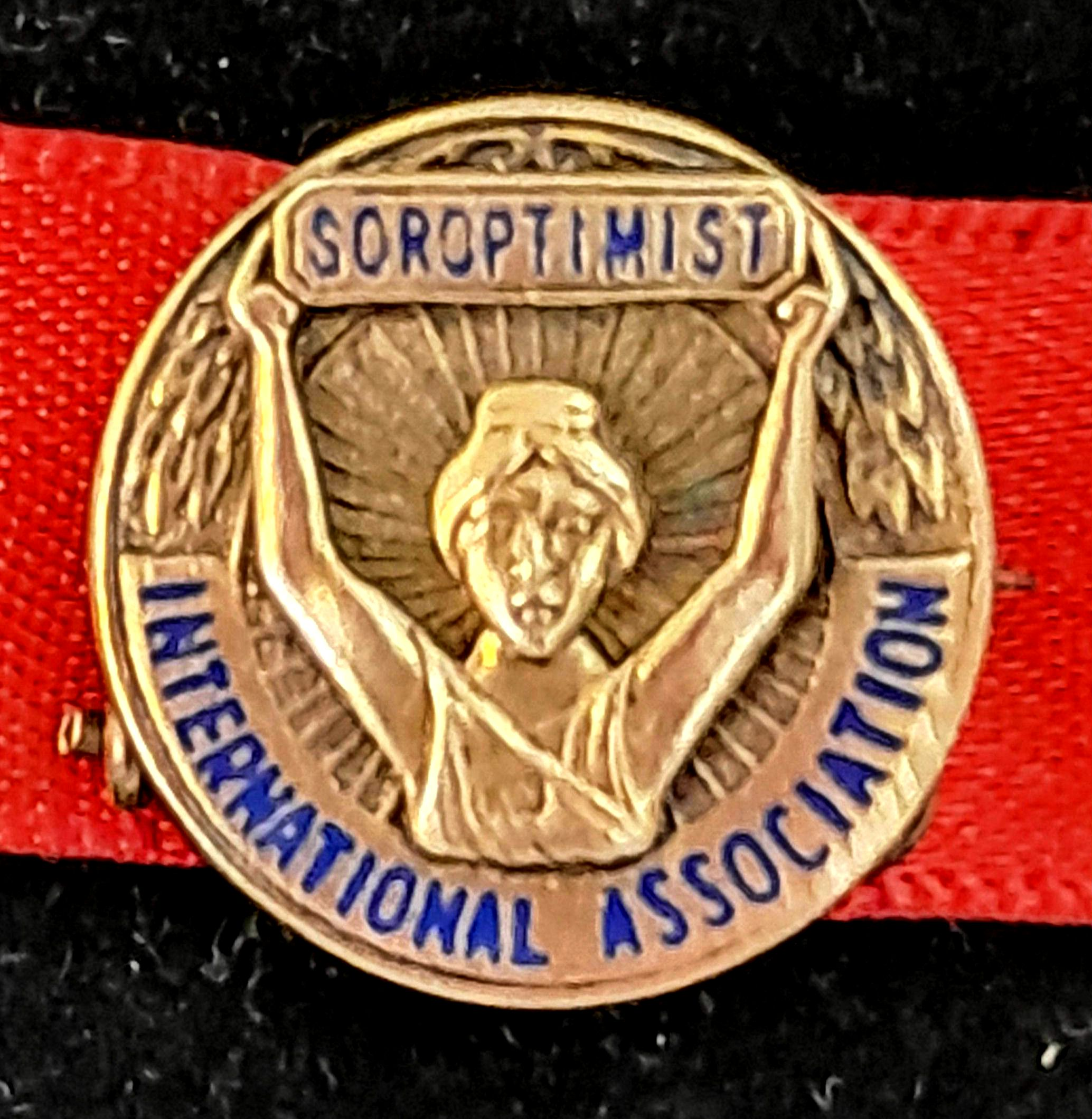
Fisher's Soroptimist International badge

When Fisher was elected mayor in 1949, she had been a member of the Harrogate Conservative Association for nearly forty years. She belonged to Harrogate Soroptimists Club in the 1930s. In 2023 they were campaigning for a Harrogate brown plaque in celebration of Fisher's achievements.

== Awards ==
Fisher was appointed Member of the Order of the British Empire (MBE) in the 1958 Birthday Honours. She was made an honorary freeman of the borough of Harrogate in 1970, and elected to the Roll of Honorary Aldermen of Harrogate in the same year.

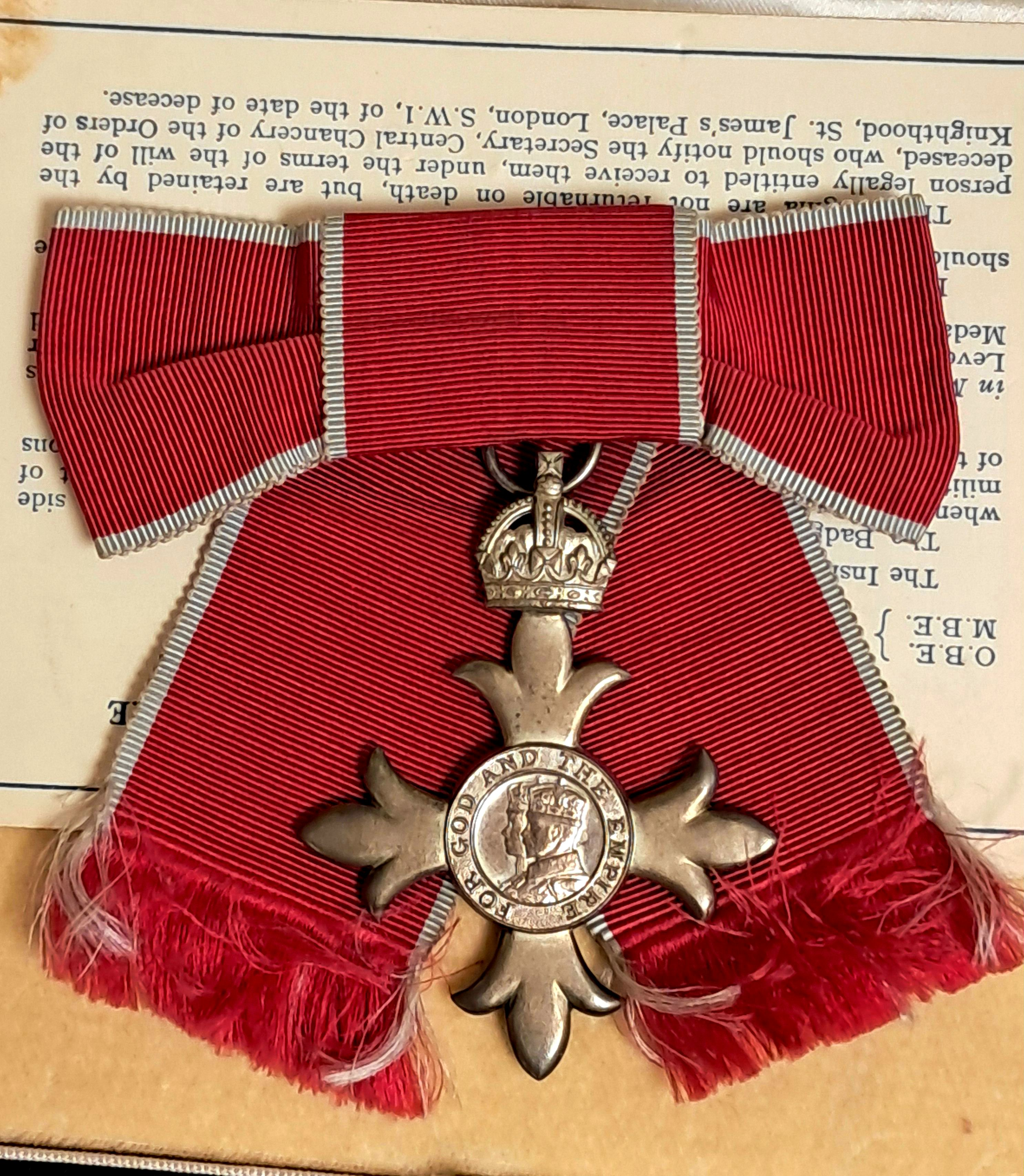
Fisher's MBE insignia

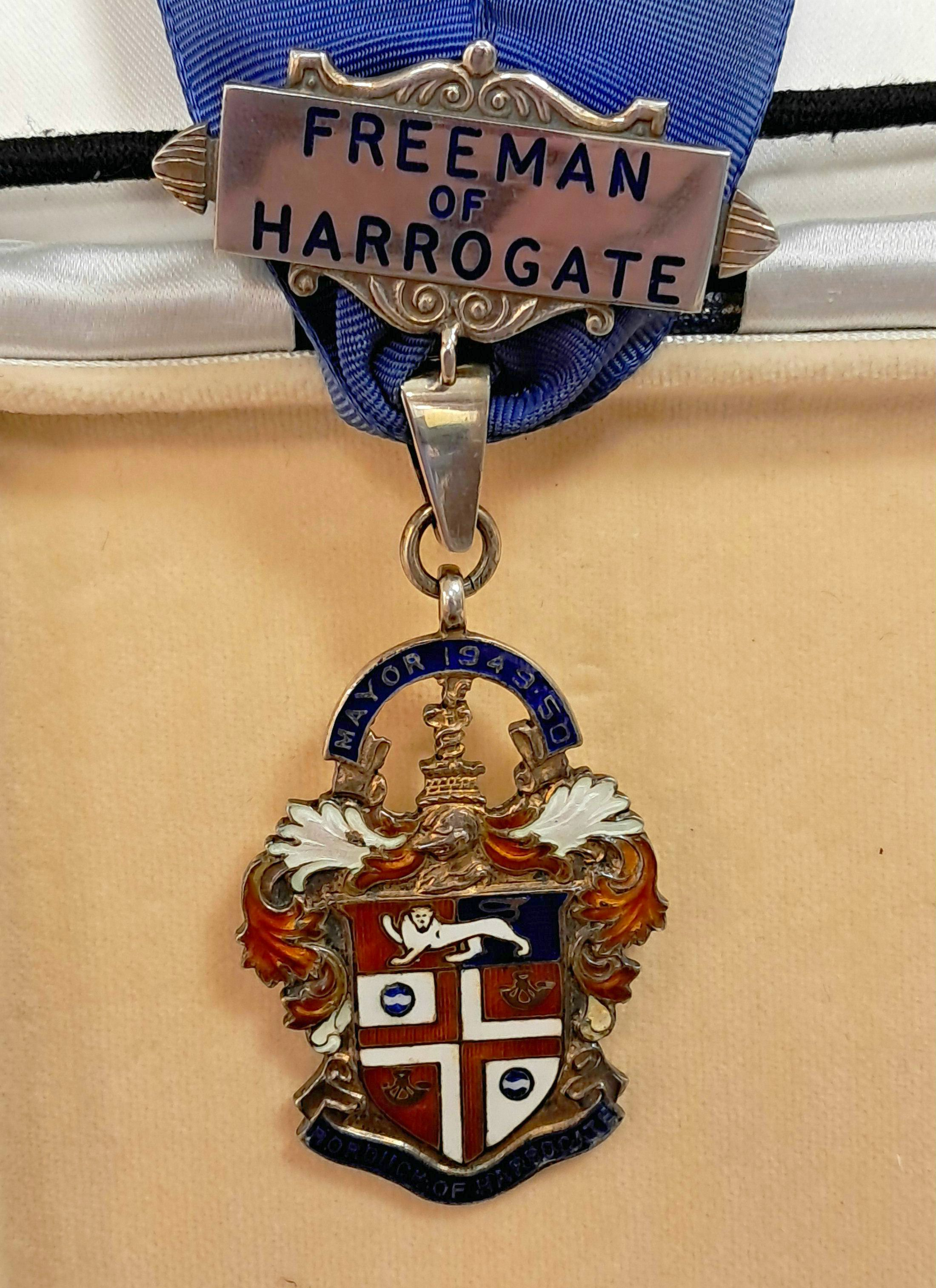
Fisher's Freedom of Harrogate badge

== Legacy ==
On International Women's Day, 8 March 2024, Harrogate Soroptimists celebrated Fisher's life as part of a plan "to recognise the female trailblazers of the past and present". Although her death made local front-page news, and Harrogate Soroptimists described her as "much beloved", she was forgotten for many years, until 2023. Nevertheless, they said that, along with Laura Veale and Kathleen Rutherford she was a woman who "made a difference" between 1930 and 1959. They commented: "Women like Mary Fisher should be remembered for being the First Lady Mayor of Harrogate as well as for all the work she did on various committees particularly with regard [to] children, older people and the blind and deaf".

In June 2025, Harrogate Civic Society was planning to erect a brown plaque on the gatepost of 1 Mount Parade in Harrogate in commemoration of Fisher. The plaque was duly unveiled by the Town Mayor of Harrogate, Chris Aldred, on 22 July, watched by members of Harrogate Soroptimists, members of Harrogate Civic Society, relatives of Mary Fisher, and others.

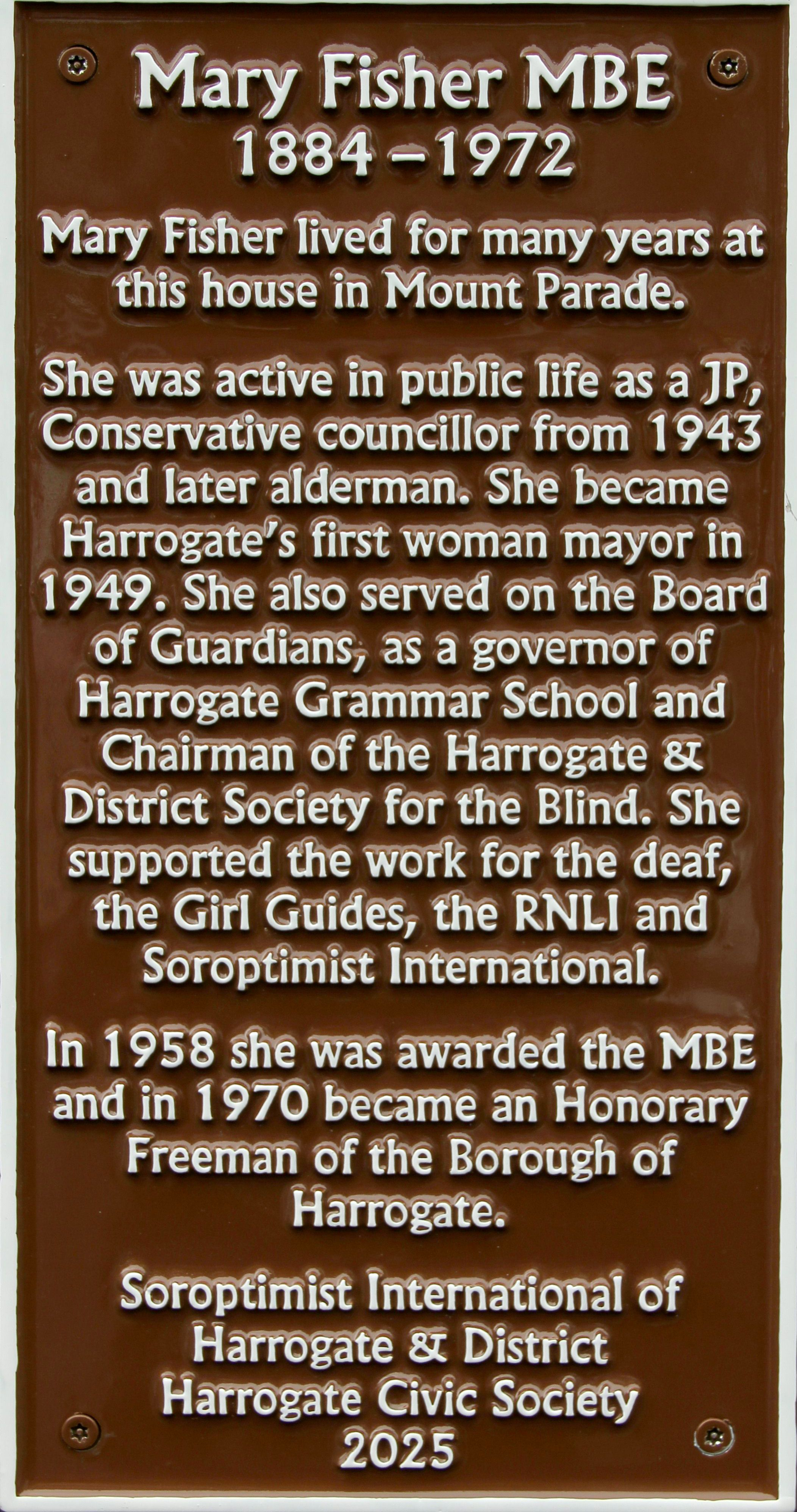
Mary Fisher's brown plaque

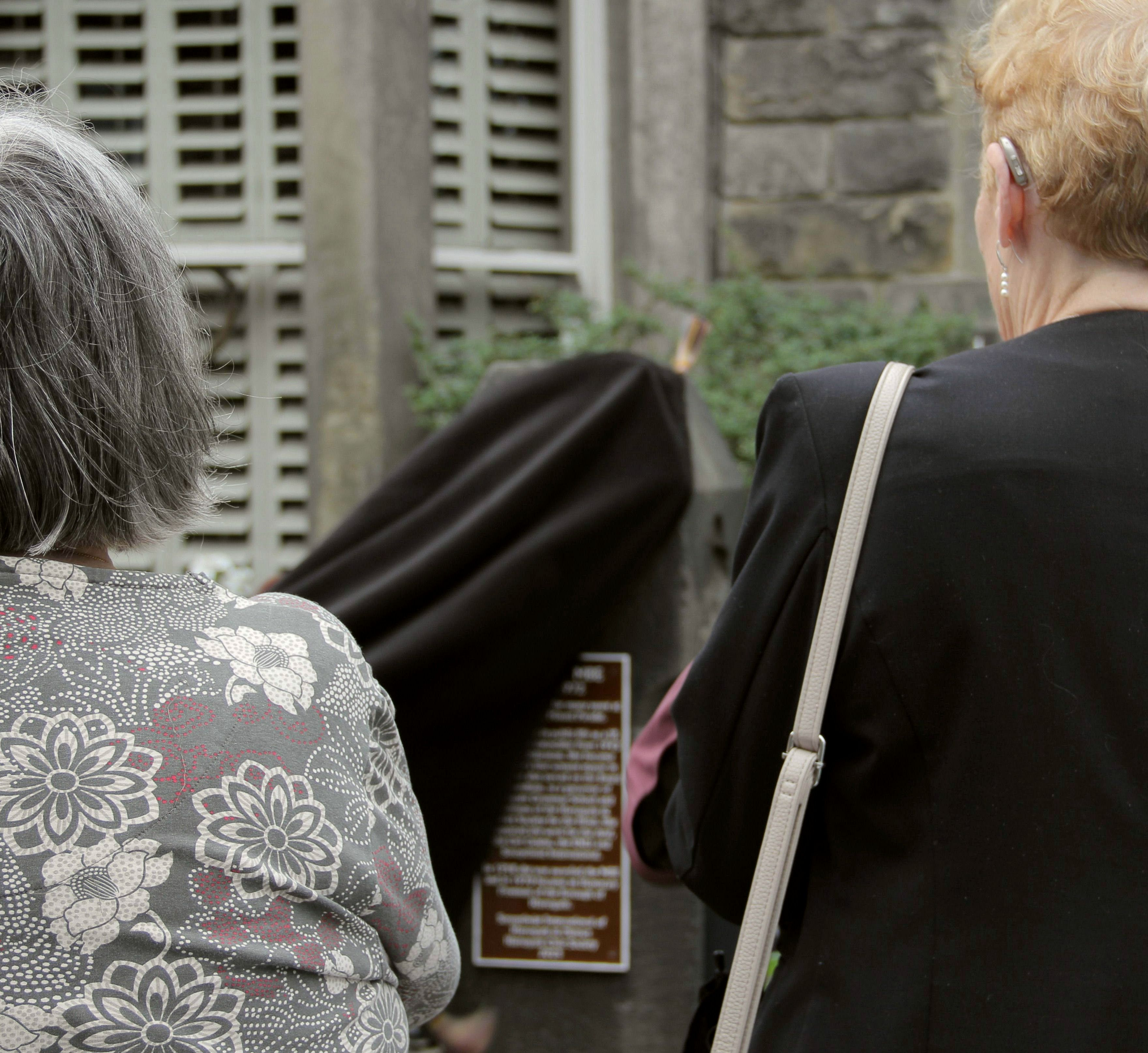
The brown plaque unveiled on 22 July 2025

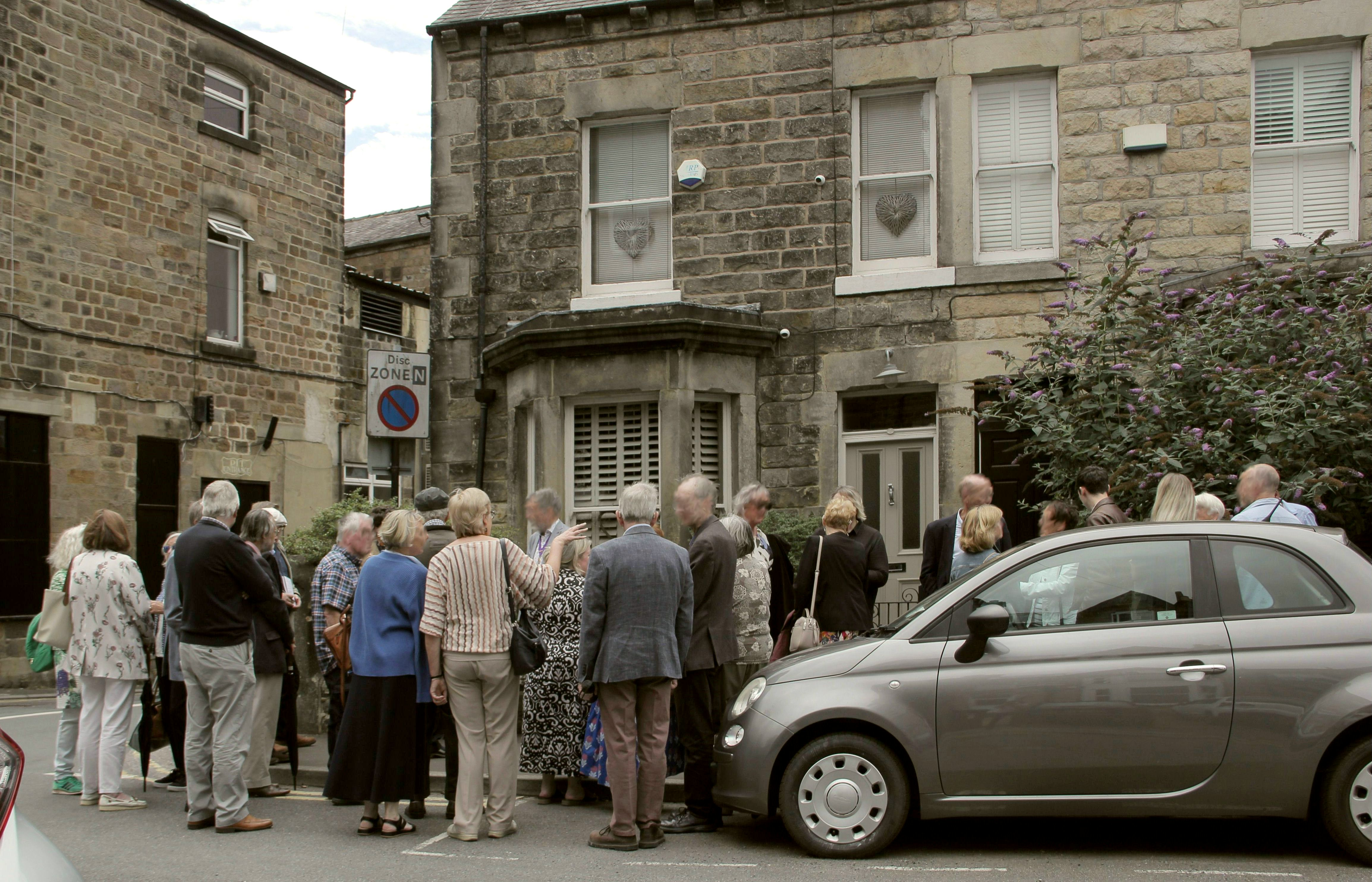
The unveiling, at Fisher's former residence
