= Tait–Ervin House =

Historic house in Alabama, United States

- U.S. National Register of Historic Places
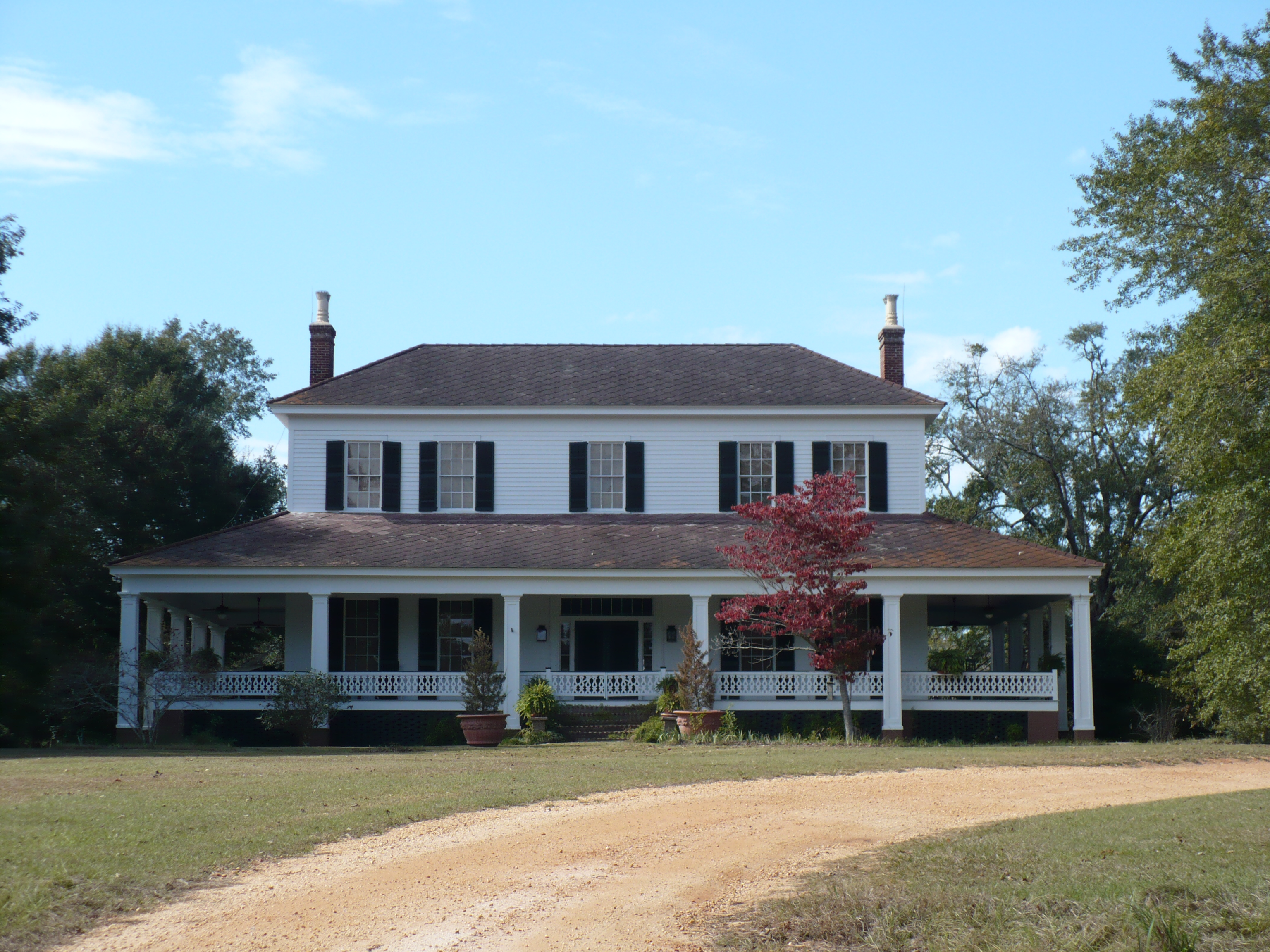
- Front elevation of the Tait–Ervin House, showing the wrap-around Carolina porch

- Location within Alabama Location within the United States
- Nearest city: Camden, Alabama
- Coordinates: 31°58′19″N 87°22′38″W
- Built: 1855
- NRHP reference No.: 95000147
- Added to NRHP: February 24, 1995

The Tait–Ervin House, also known as Countryside, is a historic plantation house near Camden, Alabama. The two-story wood-frame house was built in 1855 for Robert Tait by a builder named Henry Cook. Robert was the grandson of Charles Tait, a United States Senator from Georgia. The plantation was acquired after the American Civil War by Robert Tait's sister, Sarah Asbury Tait Ervin, and her husband, Dr. Robert Hugh Ervin. Dr. Ervin served in both houses of the Alabama Legislature and was elected President Pro Tem of the state senate in 1872. The house remained in the Ervin family until 1991, when it was sold to the Phillipi family. The house was added to the National Register of Historic Places on February 24, 1995.

== Gallery ==
Historic American Buildings Survey photographs from 1936:

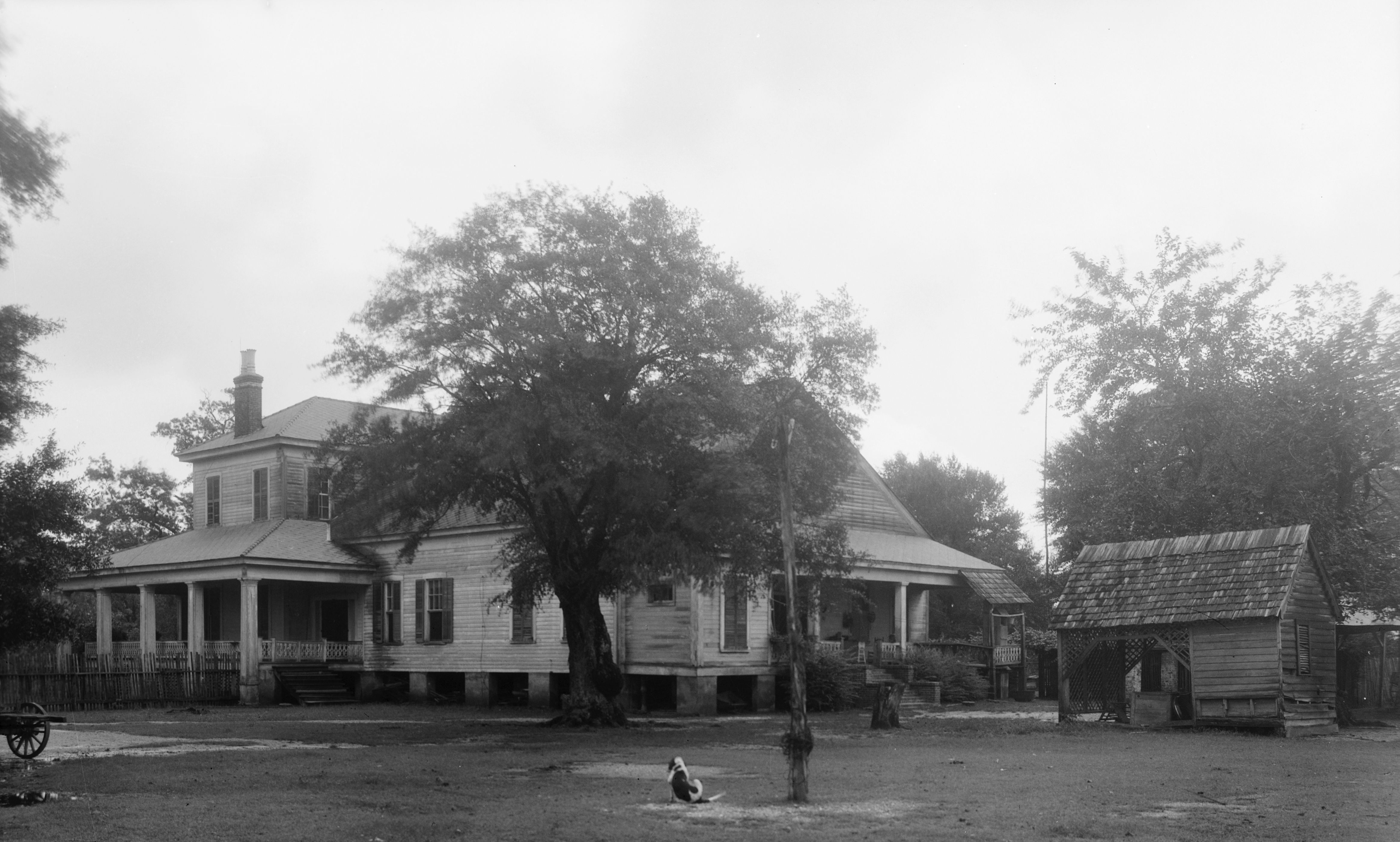
North (rear) and east elevation

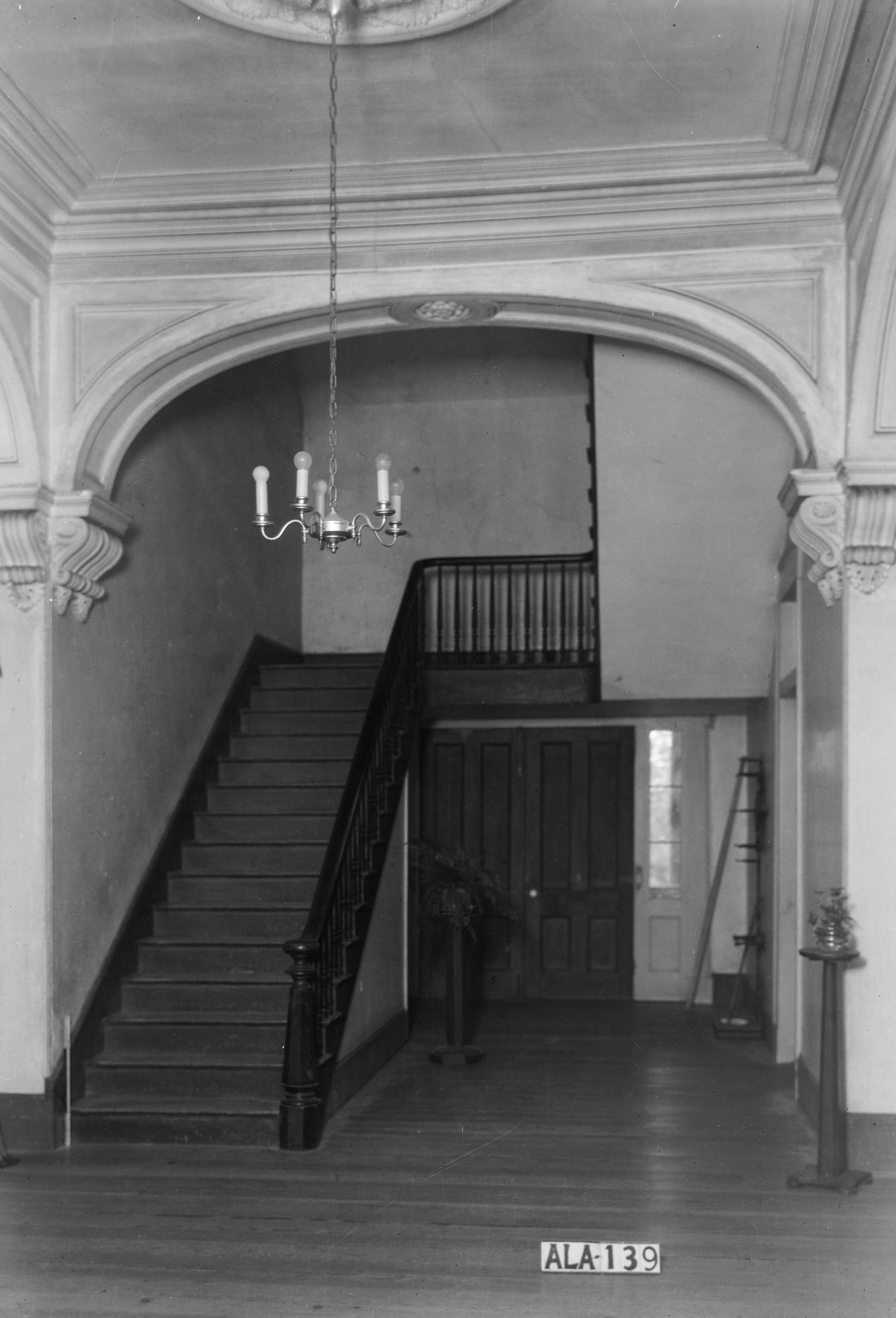
View of plasterwork and stairs

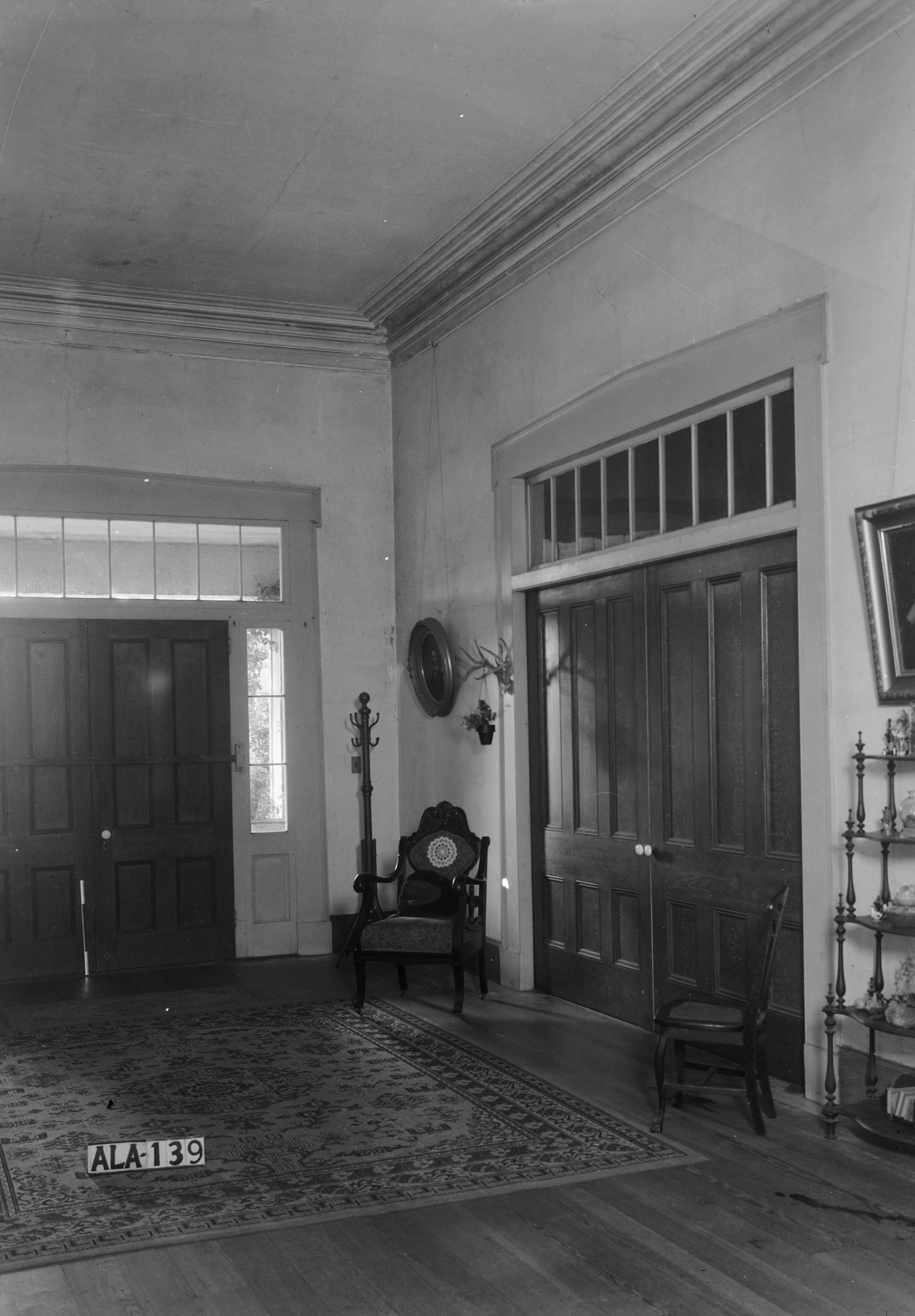
View of front hall
