= Great Yorkshire Show =

Agricultural show in North Yorkshire, England

- Status: Active
- Genre: Agricultural show
- Begins: second Tuesday of July
- Ends: three days later (Friday)
- Frequency: Annually
- Venue: Great Yorkshire Showground (since 1951)
- Locations: Harrogate, North Yorkshire
- Coordinates: 53°59′02″N 1°30′21″W
- Country: England
- Inaugurated: 1838 (188 years ago) as the Yorkshire Agricultural Society Show
- Next event: 13–16 July 2027 (168th edition)
- Attendance: 140,000 (2025)
- Patrons: King Charles III (1998–present); Queen Elizabeth II (1952–1997)
- Sponsor: Yorkshire Agricultural Society
- Website: greatyorkshireshow.co.uk

The Great Yorkshire Show (GYS) is an annual agricultural show which takes place on the Great Yorkshire Showground in Harrogate, North Yorkshire, in the North of England. Organised and run by the Yorkshire Agricultural Society (YAS), the show lasts four days, starting on the second Tuesday of July. Since the demise of the Royal Show, the GYS has been the largest agricultural show in England; however, within the United Kingdom, it is surpassed by both the Royal Welsh Show and the Royal Highland Show. The show is highly successful and the society generated income of £9.6 million in 2016. A new hall at the showground, costing £11 million, opened in 2016 and produced more than £1 million of income in its first year.

== History ==
The history of the GYS is intimately connected with that of the Yorkshire Agricultural Society (YAS).

- 1837: The YAS was founded; its primary aim was stated as "... to hold an Annual Meeting for the Exhibition of Farming Stock, Implements &c., and for the General Promotion of Agriculture."
- 1838: The first YAS Show was held in the Barrack Yard at Fulford, near York. The numbers attending were not recorded, but the event was counted a success; police had to use their batons to restore order among the large numbers of visitors when they began to force their way in without paying.
- Originally intended as a peripatetic event, the Show moved to Leeds, Northallerton and Kingston upon Hull in subsequent years.
- 1842: The show returned to York. This is the first year for which attendance figures are available — the Show in 1842 had a paid attendance of 6,044. By 1843 the YAS Show had become known as the "Great Yorkshire Show", apparently by popular acclamation rather than in any official sense.
- The GYS continued to be held in various places around Yorkshire until 1950.
- 1915–1919: Cancelled due to the First World War.
- 1920: The GYS was held jointly with the Royal Agricultural Society of England in Darlington.
- 1931: Huddersfield
- 1933: The GYS was held in Marton in Middlesbrough.
- 1940–1948: Cancelled due to the Second World War.
- 1948: By now the YAS was coming to the conclusion that the expenses involved in setting up a new showground every year were becoming prohibitive.
- 1949: It was agreed in York by the council of the show, and announced on 22 June 1949 by the Harrogate mayor Mary Fisher that a permanent showground be acquired in that town.
- 1950: The last peripatetic show, in Malton. The YAS bought a site at Hookstone Oval in Harrogate for £16,500.
- 1951: From here on, Hookstone Oval in Harrogate has been the permanent site for the GYS. The 1951 the attendance figure was nearly 54,000.
- 2001: Cancelled due to the outbreak of foot and mouth disease in Britain.
- 2006: The most successful show so far in terms of attendance figures, with 135,111 visitors.
- 2008: The show was attended by the Queen to celebrate the 150th occasion on which the Show had been held.
- 2011: The show came close to the record with 135,086 visitors.
- 2012: This show (the 154th) was cancelled on Tuesday 10 July 2012 after only one day, due to exceptional rain which had made the showground car parks unsafe. Organisers stated that the decision had been taken "reluctantly". This was the first cancellation due to weather. (Earlier cancellations had been due to war or foot and mouth disease.) An old bulldozer towed horse trailers out of muddy ground.
- 2017: The show was held on Tuesday 11 – Thursday 13 July 2017. This was the 159th show.
- 2018: This was the 160th show and was held on Tuesday 10 – Thursday 12 July 2018.
- 2020: The show (the 162nd), which would have been held on the Tuesday 14 – Thursday 16 July 2020, was cancelled on Monday 23 March 2020 due to the COVID-19 pandemic. This was the first show to be fully cancelled since 2001.
- 2021: For the first time in its history, the show was held over four days, between Tuesday and Friday, 13–16 July.
- 2023: The show for the first time saw the introduction of the Innovation Zone.
- 2025: The 166th edition of the show was deemed sold out, with an attendance of 140,000 visitors.

== Showground ==
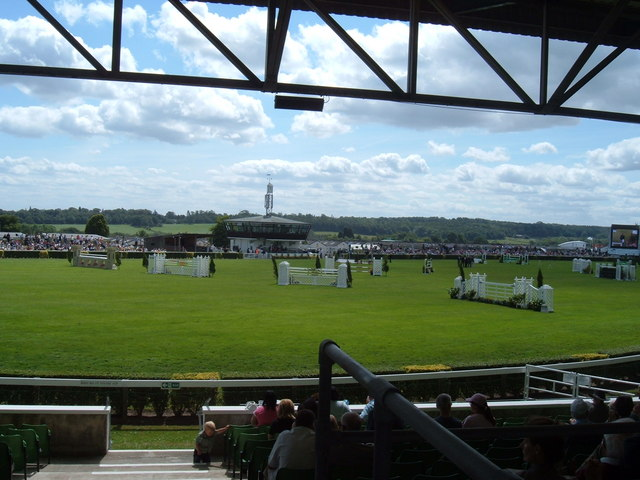
The showground

The Great Yorkshire Showground is situated off Railway Road, on the outskirts of Harrogate. The site is 250 acres (100 ha) in area, and consists mainly of grassland with several permanent structures. These include:

- Main grandstand and show-ring
- Country Pursuits arena (featuring Hounds and Birds of Prey)
- Flower Show
- "White Rose" grandstand and show-ring
- Housing for cattle, sheep, pigs and other livestock
- Multi-purpose conference and exhibition halls (known as the "Yorkshire Event Centre")
- Dining and function facilities (known as "Pavilions of Harrogate")
- Office accommodation for the Yorkshire Agricultural Society, which has its headquarters at the showground

The showground facilities are used all the year round for various functions and events ranging from the Great Yorkshire Show to antiques fairs, trade shows, business conferences and wedding receptions. It is estimated that one million people visit the showground per year.

== Royal visits ==
The relationship between the Yorkshire Agricultural Society and the Royal Family goes right back to the foundation of the Society by a group of leading agriculturalists, led by the John Spencer, 3rd Earl Spencer, in 1837 before organising the first Great Yorkshire Show the following year.

The Show has welcomed members of the Royal Family over the years, some of whom have also been Patrons of the Society.

Queen Elizabeth II was the first female Patron of the Society, and remained so for 45 years from 1952 to 1997. King Charles III has been the Society’s Patron since 1998.

=== List of royal visits ===
- 2023 – Visit by Prince Richard, Duke of Gloucester
- 2022 – Visit by Anne, Princess Royal
- 2021 – Visit by Charles, Prince of Wales and Camilla, Duchess of Cornwall
- 2019 – Visit by Prince Andrew, Duke of York
- 2018 – Visit by the Princess Royal
- 2015 – Visit by the Prince of Wales and the Duchess of Cornwall
- 2014 – Visit by Sophie, Countess of Wessex (Tues) and the Princess Royal (Wed)
- 2011 – Visit by the Prince of Wales and the Duchess of Cornwall
- 2010 – Visit by the Princess Royal
- 2008 – Visit by Queen Elizabeth II and Prince Philip, Duke of Edinburgh
- 2006 – Visit by the Prince of Wales and the Duchess of Cornwall
- 2002 – Visit by the Duke of York
- 1999 – Visit by the Prince of Wales
- 1998 – The Prince of Wales became Patron
- 1994 – Visit by Princess Alexandra
- 1992 – Visit by the Princess Royal
- 1990 – Visit by the Duke of York and Sarah, Duchess of York
- 1987 – Visit by Katharine, Duchess of Kent
- 1982 – Visit by Princess Margaret, Countess of Snowdon
- 1977 – Visit by Queen Elizabeth II and the Duke of Edinburgh
- 1972 – Visit by the Duchess of Kent, who was the Society’s President that year
- 1957 – Visit by Elizabeth II
- 1952 – 1997 – Queen Elizabeth II was Patron of the Society.
- 1951 – King George VI was Patron, Mary, Princess Royal and Countess of Harewood was president and visited the show
- 1949 – Visit by the Princess Elizabeth,
- 1932 – Visit by Prince Albert, Duke of York and Elizabeth, Duchess of York
- 1926 – Visit by Princess Mary, later Princess Royal and Countess of Harewood. She was the aunt of Elizabeth II and was the first female President
- 1896 – Visit by Prince George, Duke of York as President of the Society
- 1867 – 1910 – Albert Edward, Prince of Wales, later Edward VII, was the society’s 1st Royal Patron
- 1848 – Visit by Prince Albert of Saxe-Coburg and Gotha, consort of Queen Victoria
- 1838 – The Society's first President and a founder member was John Spencer, 3rd Earl Spencer, a cousin of Queen Victoria and an ancestor of Diana, Princess of Wales.

== Sources ==
- Hall, Vance (1987). A History of the Yorkshire Agricultural Society 1837—1987. London: Batsford. ISBN 978-0-7134-5783-4.
