= Countryside, Kansas =

- Neighborhood
- Flag

- Location of Countryside, Kansas
- Coordinates: 39°0′58″N 94°39′19″W
- Country: United States
- State: Kansas
- County: Johnson

Area
  - Total: 0.12 sq mi (0.3 km^{2})
  - Land: 0.12 sq mi (0.3 km^{2})
  - Water: 0 sq mi (0.0 km^{2})

Population (2000)
  - Total: 295
  - Density: 2,450/sq mi (945.9/km^{2})
- Time zone: UTC-6 (Central (CST))
  - Summer (DST): UTC-5 (CDT)
- ZIP Code: 66202
- Area code: 913
- FIPS code: 20-15975

Countryside was a half-mile-wide residential area in Johnson County, Kansas, USA, which was incorporated by its residents as a city on July 2, 1951, under Kansas Law. In a special election on December 3, 2002, residents voted to consolidate with the surrounding city of Mission, Kansas, in which the houses and streets had originally been built in the unincorporated Mission Township of Johnson County beginning in 1937. Countryside, as a city governmental entity, ceased to exist on January 15, 2003, however, the originally founded Countryside Homes Association, Inc. neighborhood remains active.

As a city, Countryside consisted of 133 houses of middle to upper-class value situated with Lamar Avenue on the west, West 61st Street on the north, Nall Avenue on the east and Shawnee Mission Parkway on the south. The south side of West 62nd Terrace is a parkway strip of well-kept grass and trees opening, on its far side, onto a view of West 63rd Street, which had become a divided four-lane major artery, also running in an east–west direction, through Johnson County in 1960. In 1983, the W 63rd Street, Rock Creek Pkwy, Johnson Drive (US 56 & 169) corridor was renamed Shawnee Mission Parkway to reduce confusion about the three names and multiple numbers the road carried.

Countryside was dependent on Mission, Kansas for police services, Consolidated Fire District 2 provided fire protection and it had no commercial, governmental or other non-residential buildings, except Trinity Lutheran Church, within its boundaries. Its property regulations were established by the City of Countryside ordinances and its 1937 Countryside Homes Association declarations, which were revised in 2016. Countryside was the first city to consolidate with another city in Johnson County, as opposed to being annexed, and represents the first city consolidation in Kansas, since the 1960s.

== Geography ==
Countryside is located at 39°0′58″N 94°39′19″W (39.015985, -94.655297).

According to the United States Census Bureau, the city had a total area of 0.3 km^{2} (0.12 sq mi), all land.

== Demographics ==
The census of 2000 provides demographics for Countryside. The census states that there were 295 people, 133 households, and 91 families residing in the city. The population density was 949.2 people/km^{2} (2,458 people/mi^{2}). There were 133 housing units at an average density of 421.5 units/km^{2} (1,092 units/mi^{2}). The racial makeup of the city was 99.32% White, 0.34% Native American, and 0.34% from two or more races. Hispanic or Latino of any race were 1.02% of the population. 32.5% were German, 19.2% English, 13.6% Irish and 5.3% American ancestry according to Census 2000.

There were 133 households, out of which 27.1% had children under the age of 18 living with them, 60.5% were married couples living together, 7.0% had a female householder with no husband present, and 30.2% were non-families. 26.4% of all households were made up of individuals, and 7.0% had someone living alone who was 65 years of age or older. The average household size was 2.29 and the average family size was 2.77.

In the city the population was spread out, with 21.4% under the age of 18, 2.7% from 18 to 24, 34.6% from 25 to 44, 26.8% from 45 to 64, and 14.6% who were 65 years of age or older. The median age was 41 years. For every 100 females, there were 86.7 males. For every 100 females age 18 and over, there were 90.2 males.

The median income for a household in the city was $73,958, and the median income for a family was $88,029. Males had a median income of $49,063 versus $52,813 for females. The per capita income for the city was $37,129. About 2.7% of families and 1.0% of the population were below the poverty line, including 1.1% of those under the age of eighteen and none of those 65 or over.
