= Graham Fletcher (equestrian) =

British equestrian

Personal information
- Nationality: British
- Born: 9 January 1951 (age 74); Thirsk, England

Sport
- Sport: Equestrian

Graham Fletcher (born 9 January 1951) is a British equestrian. He competed in two events at the 1976 Summer Olympics.
