= List of crossings of the River Ure =

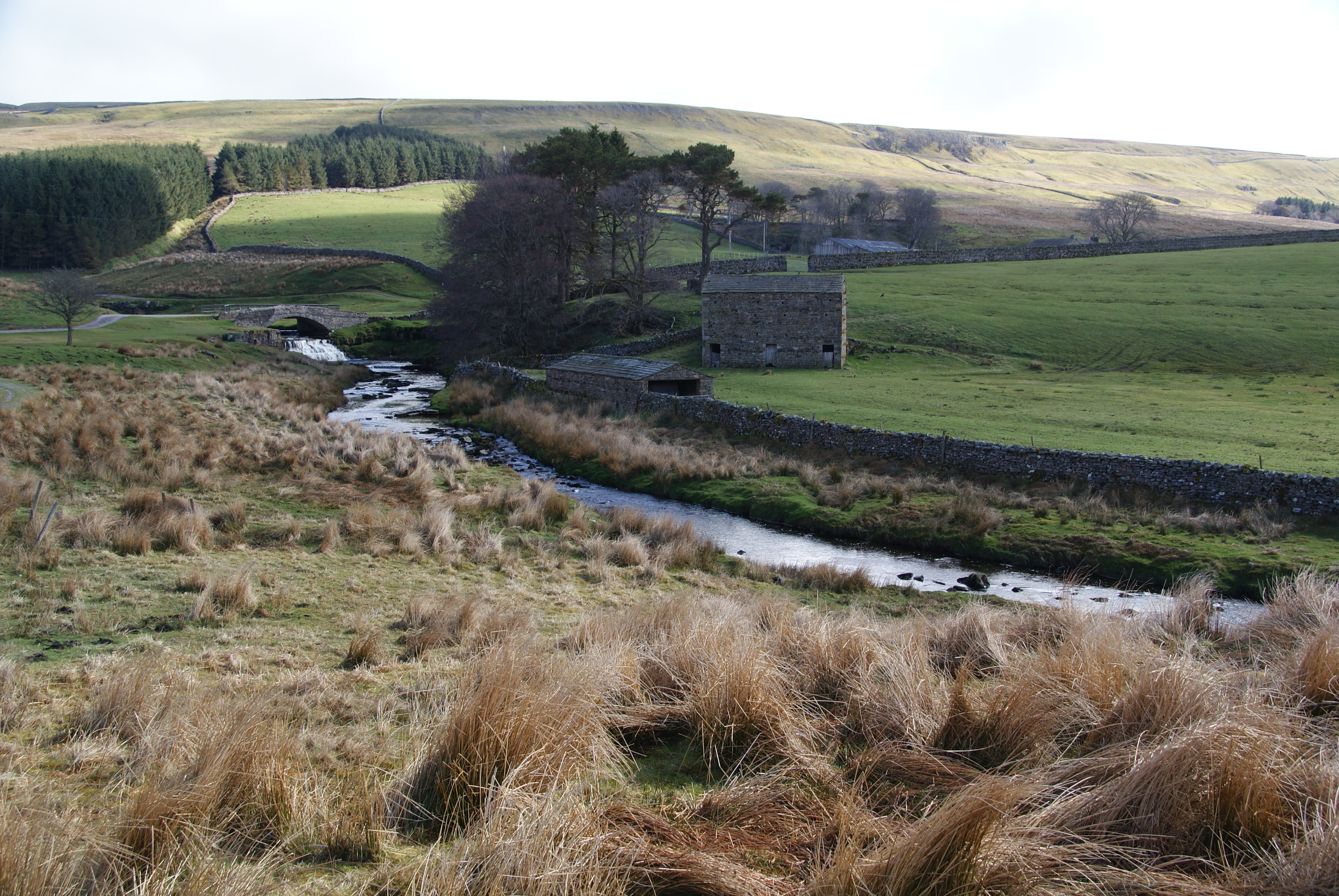
The River Ure below Ure Force Rigg

This is a list of current bridges and other crossings of the River Ure in North Yorkshire, which are listed from its source downstream to the river's mouth. The River Ure is listed on mapping as starting at Ure Head on High Abbotside (SD805968). The named River Ure ends where Ouse Gill meets the Ure near Great Ouseburn and it becomes the River Ouse (see List of crossings of the River Ouse, Yorkshire).

As with other river locations in Northern England, especially in the old North Riding of Yorkshire, many bridges were built at the locations of fords across the river. Examples of this are Scabba Wath Bridge and Harper Wath which is just outside Aysgarth. Harper Wath marked the limit of the property of Easby Abbey (later Marrick Priory), and later had a footbridge installed immediately downstream (Turn Hole Footbridge). Wath comes from the Old Norse vað meaning ford. Many of the old fords are now not used, or have some stepping stones in place.

The old railway crossings on the formation of railways over the river have been demolished; one was a girder bridge between Aysgarth and Hawes stretching for 200 feet (61 m) across the river. Another, far further downstream in Ripon was the Ure Viaduct. This was demolished in the 1970s and the position it occupied is now largely taken up by the Duchess of Kent road bridge which takes the bypass around Ripon. A third demolished railway viaduct was in Boroughbridge which consisted of two iron girder spans, each measuring 125 feet (38 m) in length. The viaduct was last used in October 1964, and was demolished sometime afterwards.

The old name for the river was the Yore which gave way to the Ure; Yoredale describing the valley on Wensleydale was the common name for the valley until the start of the 18th century. There are bridges over the river at Bainbridge and Aysgarth that are both called Yore Bridge and are both grade II listed. The one at Bainbridge was built in 1796 and the one at Aysgarth was built in the 16th century and widened in 1788.

The canalised sections of the River Ure downstream of Ripon, most notably the Milby Cut, and the Westwick Cut, are not included for any structures over the formation.

== Crossings ==
Crossing	Location	Type	Co-ordinates	Date opened	Listing (Note: Either grade I, II* II, SM (scheduled monument), or N/A – not applicable)	Notes	Photo
Green Bridge	Lunds	Track	54.3610°N 2.3306°W		N/A		Green_Bridge_-_geograph.org.uk_-_6588742
How Beck Bridge	Lunds	Track	54.3558°N 2.3311°W	Mid to late 18th century	II		How_Beck_Bridge_-_geograph.org.uk_-_6588983
Beck Side bridge	Lunds	Track	54.3461°N 2.3201°W		N/A		
Blades footbridge	Lunds	Footpath	54.3396°N 2.3179°W		N/A		Blades_foot_bridge_-_geograph.org.uk_-_1236348
Unnamed track	Lunds	Track	54.3363°N 2.3114°W		N/A		Bridge over the River Ure south of Blades
Yore House Farm bridge	Lunds	Track	54.3331°N 2.3085°W		N/A		River Ure
Thwaite Bridge	Thwaite	Road	54.3257°N 2.2691°W		N/A		Thwaite Bridge
Thwaite road bridge	Thwaite	Road	54.3255°N 2.2670°W		N/A	Carries the A684 road over the river	
Unnamed bridge	Appersett	Track	54.3194°N 2.2354°W		N/A		
Appersett New Bridge	Appersett	Road	54.3140°N 2.2199°W	Mid to late 19th century	II	Carries the A684 road	A684 bridge at Appersett
Haylands Bridge	Hawes	Road	54.3090°N 2.1915°W	Late 18th, early 19th century	II	Carries Brunt Acres Road over the river	Haylands Bridge
Yore Bridge	Bainbridge	Road	54.3121°N 2.1037°W	1793	II	Built by John Carr of York	Yore Bridge taking Bainbridge to Breconbar road over River Ure
Worton Bridge	Worton	Road	54.3079°N 2.0701°W		N/A		Worton Bridge
Harper Wath (Turn Hole) Footbridge	Aysgarth	Pedestrian bridge	54.2959°N 2.0081°W		N/A		Footbridge over the River Ure
Yore Bridge	Aysgarth	Road	54.2931°N 1.9850°W	16th century	II	Has a single span of 70 feet (21 m) over the river.	Yore Bridge at Aysgarth with the River Ure in spate
Lords Bridge	West Witton	Road (private)	54.2982°N 1.8855°W	1733	II		
Wensley Bridge	Wensley	Road	54.3004°N 1.8612°W	15th century	II	A bridge probably existed before the current one. It was repaired in the 17th century, and widened in 1812.	Wensley Bridge
Middleham Bridge	Middleham	Road	54.2943°N 1.8186°W	1830	II	Altered and repaired in 1865 after being damaged by cattle "which were being driven across the bridge, getting into step" according to local legend.	Middleham Bridge
Ulshaw Bridge	Ulshaw	Road	54.2804°N 1.7786°W	16th century	II		River Ure, Ulshaw Bridge
Kilgram Bridge	Rookwith	Road	54.2693°N 1.7076°W	12th century	SM		Kilgram_Bridge_-_geograph.org.uk_-_1488276
Masham Bridge	Masham	Road	54.2261°N 1.6547°W	1754	II	Built to replace an earlier bridge on the site.	River Ure, Masham Bridge
Tanfield Bridge	West Tanfield	Road	54.2037°N 1.5881°W	c. 1725	II	Built to replace a ferry crossing on the same site	The (widened) bridge over the Ure at West Tanfield
North Bridge	Ripon/Ure Bank	Road	54.1437°N 1.5153°W	c. 14th century	II	Has been repaired and widened many times	North Bridge
Duchess of Kent Bridge	Ripon	Road	54.1429°N 1.5134°W	20 March 1996	N/A	Opened by the Duchess of Kent; carries the A61 Ripon bypass over the River Ure, and is sited mostly on the foundations of the Ure Viaduct, which carried the railway.	Ure Bypass Bridge
Hewick Bridge	Copt Hewick	Road	54.2693°N 1.7076°W	18th century	II		B6265_road_bridge_over_River_Ure
A1(M) bridge (Arrows Bridge)	Boroughbridge	Motorway	54.0977°N 1.4105°W	November 1995	N/A	A 3-span motorway bridge with a length of 125 metres (410 ft).	Motorway crossing the River Ure
A168 bridge ([Old] Arrows Bridge)	Boroughbridge	Road	54.0980°N 1.4100°W	1963	N/A		Bridges over the River Ure
Borough Bridge	Boroughbridge	Road	54.0974°N 1.3954°W	1562	II	Carries the B6265 through Boroughbridge. It was widened in 1785 and repaired in 1969.	West side of the Borough Bridge (2)
Aldwark Bridge	Aldwark	Footbridge	54.0625°N 1.2884°W		N/A		Footbridge over the River Ure
Aldwark Toll Bridge	Aldwark	Road	54.0534°N 1.2881°W	1772	II		Aldwark Bridge
