= Church of St Oswald, Thornton Steward =

Anglican church in North Yorkshire, England

Church of St Oswald
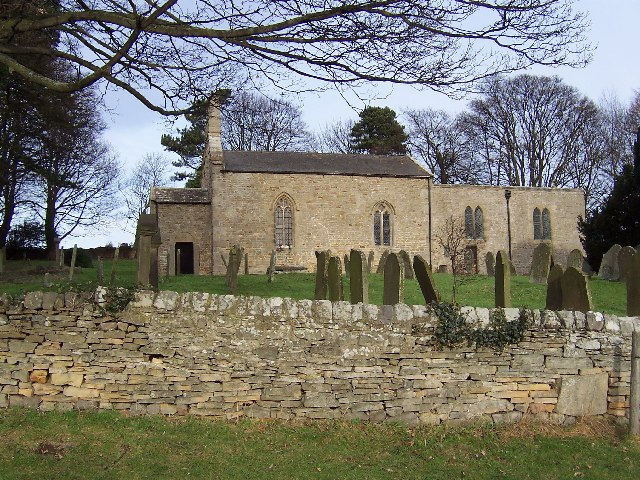

- Location within North Yorkshire
- 54.2778°N 1.7397°W
- OS grid reference: SE 17050 86939
- Location: Thornton Steward
- Country: England
- Denomination: Anglican
- Website: Official webpage

History
- Status: Active
- Dedication: Saint Oswald

Administration
- Diocese: Anglican Diocese of Leeds
- Archdeaconry: Richmond and Craven
- Deanery: Wensley
- Benefice: Middleham with Coverdale and East Witton and Thornton Steward
- Parish: Middleham with Coverdale and East Witton and Thornton Steward

Listed Building – Grade II*
- Designated: 15 February 1967
- Reference no.: 1130925

The Church of St Oswald, Thornton Steward is an Anglican church to the west of the village of Thornton Steward in North Yorkshire, England. St Oswald's is thought to be one of the oldest churches in Wensleydale. It was mentioned in the Domesday Book, and has Norman origins. The building is located in a burial plot dating back as far as the 7th century, and is now a grade II* listed structure.

== History ==
The Church of St Oswald stands on ground slightly lower than the village of Thornton Steward, and a little over 0.25-mile (0.40 km) to the west. The entry for Thornton Steward in the Domesday Book mentions the settlement having a church. Thornton Steward was so named as it belonged to the stewards of the Earl of Richmond, the first of whom, Alan, the nephew of William the Conqueror, is thought to have built the present church. In 1146, the church and certain lands surrounding it were given to the Priory of St Martin, near Richmond. The church has walls that are Norman in origin, with the nave and chancel having Saxon origins, but the north vestry, and the west end porch being added later. The blocked nave windows, and a notable south doorway with a zigzag arch have been identified as Norman in construction.

The church does not have a tower, but a Bell-cot with three open arches is affixed to the roof at the west end. The chancel was extended in the 13th century, and its hipped-roof was lowered and flattened in 1685, and by the early part of the 18th century, the churchwardens were complaining about the effects of the roof-lowering. The flat roof allowed water to ingress into the church during periods of heavy rainfall, and as such, the large bible had to be disposed of as it kept getting wet. The font is thought to be Early English and has an octagonal bowl with concave sides that slope down to the bottom, and a Jacobean era cover which has a ball finial. A recess in the north wall is thought to have been the Easter Sepulchre.

Due to its mention in the Domesday Book and its architectural origins which date back to the 11th century, St Oswald's is known as one of the oldest churches in Wensleydale. Its isolation from the village has led to some speculation that the village did surround the church but moved eastwards away from the church building during an outbreak of the plague (nearby Finghall and the Church of St Andrew having suffered the same fate), however, Speight points out that many ancient churches in the region were constructed away from their villages. Hartley and Pontefract also state in their book "The Charm of Yorkshire Churches", that the church's remoteness from the village is common in the district. The distance from the village means there are no other buildings around it, and it has an unspoilt view across Wensleydale to Jervaulx on the south side of the River Ure. Glynne described the church as being of "...no attractive appearance..." but "...with a fine view."

Between April and September 1908, the church was extensively renovated with soil removed from the floor (being replaced with concrete), new roofs installed, and the external walls re-rendered with the pebble-dashing removed. The cost of the renovations was £750. Other renovations had been carried out before; Thomas Dunham Whitaker commented in his 1823 book A History of Richmondshire... "The external appearance of the church has been modernized, and the whole is in an extremely neat and credible state."

The church is surrounded by an ancient burial site; a new pipeline system built by Yorkshire Water in 1996 revealed up to 30 bodies from a time period between the 7th and 10th centuries. The bodies had all been buried facing towards where the sun would rise (bar one, thought to be a priest). This is a belief that on the Day of Judgement, people would rise up to face the judgement coming from the east. The dedication of the church is to Saint Oswald, and the building was grade II* listed in 1967.

== Parish and benefice ==
Thornton Steward church is part of the parish of Middleham with Coverdale, East Witton & Thornton Steward. The Archdeaconry of Richmond was created c. 1088 with Easingwold, Clapham, Bolton-on-Swale and Thornton Steward within its boundaries, and it was for nearly 200 years the wealthiest archdeaconry in England. During the 16th, 17th, 18th and 19th centuries, it was part of the Deanery of Catterick within the Diocese of Chester. The advowson for the church was the responsibility of the Scrope family during the 16th and 17th centuries, and despite their family seat being the nearby Danby Hall, all of the Scrope burials were undertaken at Spennithorne.

== See also ==
- Grade II* listed buildings in North Yorkshire (district)
- Listed buildings in Thornton Steward
