= Danby Mill =

Building in North Yorkshire, England

Coordinates: 54°16′43″N 1°46′00″W

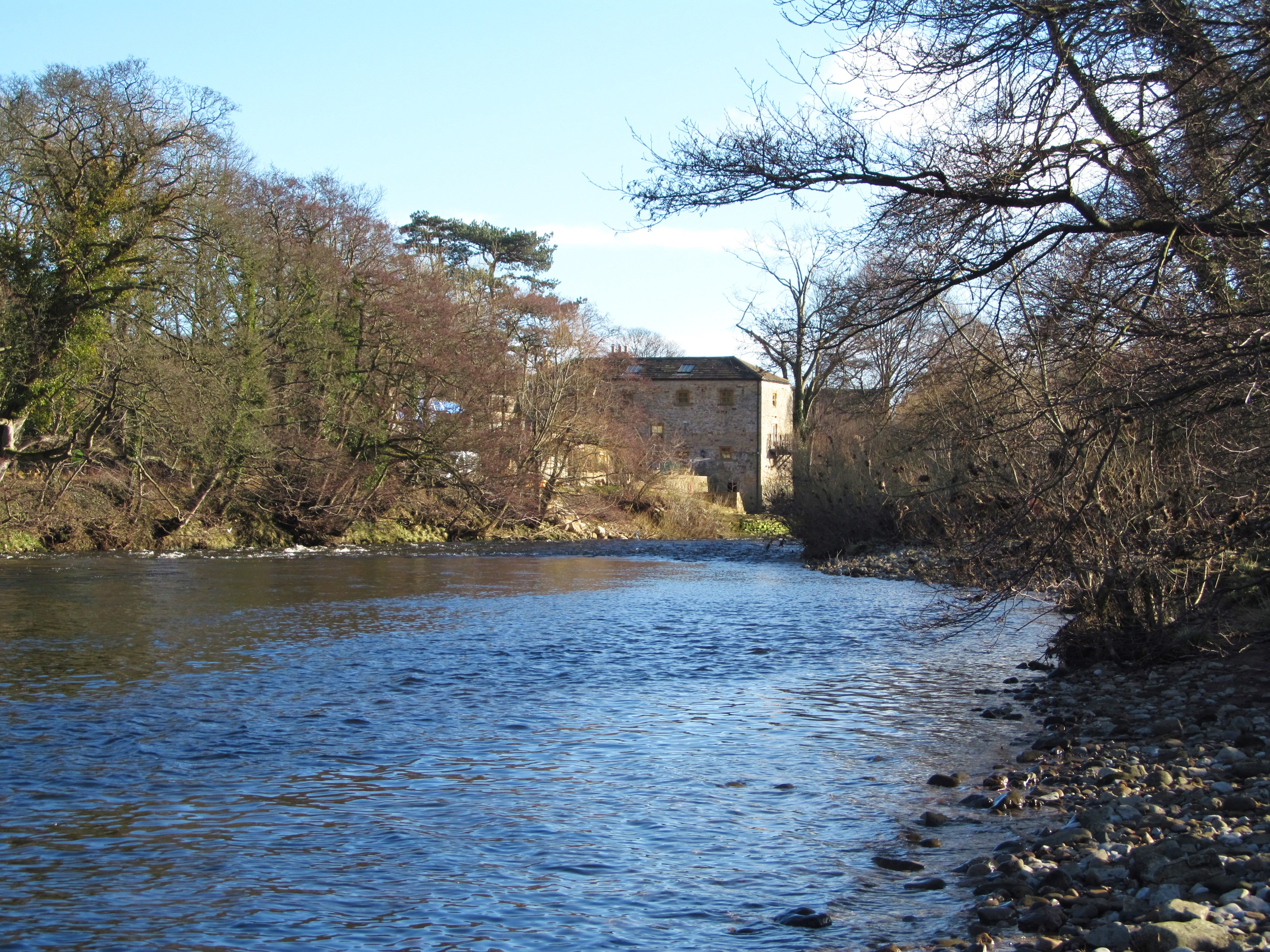
The building, in 2015

Danby Mill, also known as Danby Low Mill, is a historic building near Thornton Steward, a village in North Yorkshire, in England.

The watermill was built on the River Ure in the 17th century, and was in existence by 1688, from when some graffiti dates. It was recorded as a corn mill in 1789 and again in 1821. The mill was altered in the 18th century, and again in the 19th century, when a house was added at a right-angle to the mill building. The building was grade II listed in 1985.

The mill and house are built of stone with hipped stone slate roofs and three storeys. The mill has three bays, the entrance has a chamfered quoined surround, and above the wheel chamber is an initialled and dated lintel. At the rear is a doorway with interrupted jambs and a keystone. The house has three bays, a doorway with a moulded surround with paterae, and a cornice, and the windows are sashes. Inside, there is an undershot waterwheel with gearing, two pairs of millstones and a crown wheel.

== See also ==
- Listed buildings in Thornton Steward
