= Fort Horn =

Building in North Yorkshire, England

Coordinates: 54.2794°N 1.7279°W

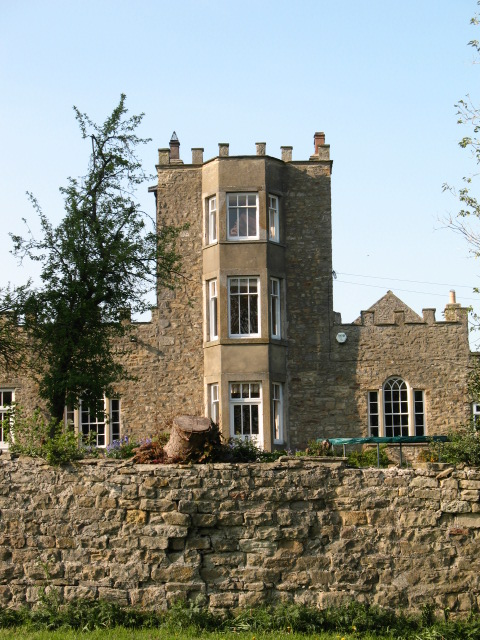
The building, in 2007

Fort Horn is a historic building in Thornton Steward, a village in North Yorkshire, in England.

The folly was constructed by during the Napoleonic Wars by a Captain Horn who held a commission in the Loyal Dales Volunteers. He supposedly intended that the building would be garrisoned by the milita if the country was invaded. The building was later converted into a house, and was grade II listed in 1985.

The building is constructed of stone with an embattled parapet and lead roofs. In the centre is a three-storey bay containing a full-height canted bay window. There is a doorway on the ground floor, and the windows are sashes. This is flanked by single-storey bays containing Venetian windows.

== See also ==
- Listed buildings in Thornton Steward
