= Listed buildings in Wensley, North Yorkshire =

Wensley is a civil parish in the county of North Yorkshire, England. It contains 16 listed buildings that are recorded in the National Heritage List for England. Of these, one is listed at Grade I, the highest of the three grades, and the others are at Grade II, the lowest grade. The parish contains the village of Wensley and the surrounding countryside. Most of the listed buildings are houses, cottages and associated structures, and the others include a church, two bridges, a folly, a former watermill and a water pump.

== Key ==
Grade	Criteria
I	Buildings of exceptional interest, sometimes considered to be internationally important
II	Buildings of national importance and special interest

== Buildings ==
Name and location	Photograph	Date	Notes	Grade
Holy Trinity Church; 54.30138°N 1.86007°W		13th century	The church has been altered and extended through the centuries. It is built in stone with sandstone dressings, and has roofs of Welsh slate and lead. The church consists of a nave, north and south aisles, north and south porches, a chancel with a north vestry, and a west tower. The tower has three stages, buttresses on the bottom stage, string courses, a two-light west window, a south stair turret, a north clock face, slit vents, two-light bell openings and a plain parapet with small corner obelisks. The south porch has a sundial above the entrance, and the interior of the church is rich in furnishings.	I
Wensley Bridge; 54.30045°N 1.86132°W		15th century	The bridge carries the A684 road over the River Ure. It is in stone and has four arches. On the downstream side, the middle two arches are pointed, the southern arch is segmental with voussoirs and a chamfered archivolt, and the north arch is semicircular. The cutwaters are triangular with concave chamfered tops. On the upstream side all the arches are semicircular with voussoirs, plain archivolts and stepped triangular cutwaters. The parapets end in circular bollards with horizontal tooling.	II
The Mount; 54.28749°N 1.87042°W		Late 17th or early 18th century	Also known as Polly Peachum's Tower, it was originally a hunting lodge, and later a folly. It is in limestone, and is a tower with a square plan and two storeys. It is on a plinth, and has rusticated quoins, a floor band, and a cornice with a low parapet. On the upper floor on each side is a window, one with an architrave. On the north front is a doorway with a quoined surround, and on the other sides are blocked or blind windows.	II
Lords Bridge; 54.29825°N 1.88558°W	—	1733	The bridge carries Bay Bolton Avenue over the River Ure. It is in stone, and consists of two segmental arches of voussoirs with plain archivolts and triangular cutwaters. The parapets are plain, and on the northeast abutment are inscribed initials and the date. At the north end are two gate piers on bases, with cornices and ball finials.	II
Gate piers, walls and railings, East Lodge; 54.30229°N 1.86186°W		Early 19th century	The gate piers are in rusticated vermiculated stone on a base, and each pier has a cornice and a ball finial with a spike. Two piers flank the entrance to the drive, and they are linked to two outer piers by curved coped walls with wrought iron railings.	II
High Saw Mill; 54.30399°N 1.85964°W	—	Early 19th century	A former corn watermill in stone with a hipped stone slate roof. There are three storeys, an L-shaped plan, and three bays. On the ground floor is a blocked opening from the waterwheel chamber, the doorway is in the middle floor, and the windows are sashes with segmental heads.	II
Pump; 54.30241°N 1.86112°W		Early 19th century	The water pump on the Village Green is in sandstone. The square pump stands on a square base, and has a cap and a pyramidal top. A cast iron spout projects from the east side.	II
School House and Sylvan View; 54.30361°N 1.86058°W	—	Early 19th century	A pair of cottages with a stone slate roof. There are two storeys and four bays. On the front are two doorways, and the windows are casements with segmental heads, those on the left two bays with architraves.	II
Victoria House; 54.30269°N 1.86040°W		Early 19th century	The house is in stone, and has a stone slate roof with shaped kneelers and stone coping. There are two storeys and two bays. To the left is a doorway with an architrave, and the windows are sashes with plain surrounds.	II
Wensley Hall and Corner House; 54.30193°N 1.86162°W		Early 19th century	A house later divided into two, it is roughcast, and has stone slate roofs. Wensley House, on the left, has a plinth, a floor band and a hipped roof. There are two storeys and three bays. In the centre is a Tuscan portico, above it is a sash window, and it is flanked by two-storey segmental bow windows, each with a hipped roof. Corner House is lower, with two storeys and five bays, and has a shaped kneeler and stone coping on the right. In the centre is a doorway with a pediment, and the windows are sashes with slightly chamfered surrounds.	II
Gates and gate piers, Wensley Hall; 54.30176°N 1.86115°W		Early 19th century	The gate piers are in stone, each on a plinth, and they have plain cornices and caps. The gates are in wrought iron with spear finials, and an urn finial to the central standard.	II
East Lodge; 54.30222°N 1.86199°W		Mid to late 19th century	The lodge is in stone, with rusticated quoins, and a Welsh slate roof with gables and decorative pierced bargeboards. There are two storeys, in the centre is a gabled bay, to the left is a single-storey porch and to the right is a tower. The porch contains a round-arched doorway with an architrave and a keystone. On the central bay is a canted bay window with a parapet and finials, above which is a two-light casement window. The tower has two stages, a single-light window on each stage, and a pyramidal roof.	II
Beech Cottage and Greystones; 54.30198°N 1.86046°W		c. 1880	The cottages are in stone with a Welsh slate roof. There are three bays, the outer bays taller and gabled, with decorative bargeboards and finials. The doorways are in the middle bay, between them is a mullioned and transomed, and above each doorway is a small window. The outer bays contain mullioned windows, and all the openings have rusticated surrounds.	II
Brython and Mount View; 54.30189°N 1.86025°W		c. 1880	The cottages are in stone with a Welsh slate roof. There are three bays, the outer bays taller and gabled, with decorative bargeboards and finials. The doorways are in the middle bay, between them is a mullioned and transomed, and above each doorway is a small window. The outer bays contain mullioned windows, and all the openings have rusticated surrounds.	II
East View and Post Office; 54.30243°N 1.86063°W		c. 1880	A pair of cottages in stone, with quoins, and a Welsh slate roof with shaped kneelers and coped gables. There is one storey with attics, and on the front are two projecting gabled bays. On the left bay is a doorway, and elsewhere are single-light or mullioned windows. All the openings have stone surrounds and shouldered lintels. On the right return is a gabled bay containing a doorway.	II
Rose Cottage and Tudor Cottage; 54.30274°N 1.86108°W		c. 1880	A pair of cottages in stone, with a Welsh slate roof, shaped kneelers and coped gables. There is one storey with attics, and on the front are two projecting gabled bays. On the left bay is a doorway, and elsewhere are single-light or mullioned windows. All the openings have stone surrounds, shouldered lintels and hood moulds. On the right return is a gabled bay containing a doorway.	II
