= Listed buildings in Thornton Steward =

Thornton Steward is a civil parish in the county of North Yorkshire, England. It contains 17 listed buildings that are recorded in the National Heritage List for England. Of these, one is listed at Grade I, the highest of the three grades, one is at Grade II*, the middle grade, and the others are at Grade II, the lowest grade. The parish contains the village of Thornton Steward, the hamlet of Ulshaw, and the surrounding countryside. The most important building in the parish is the country house Danby House, which is listed, together with associated structures. The other listed buildings include a church, a chapel and presbytery, houses and a farmhouse, a bridge, a former watermill, a guide stone, a folly and a telephone kiosk.

== Key ==
Grade	Criteria
I	Buildings of exceptional interest, sometimes considered to be internationally important
II*	Particularly important buildings of more than special interest
II	Buildings of national importance and special interest

== Buildings ==
Name and location	Photograph	Date	Notes	Grade
St Oswald's Church; 54.27780°N 1.73971°W		11th century	The church has been altered and extended through the centuries, including a restoration in 1907–08 by C. Hodgson Fowler. The church is built in stone with roofs of Welsh slate and lead, and consists of a nave, a west porch, a chancel and a north vestry. On the west gable is a double bellcote. The south doorway on the porch is Norman, with a round-arched head, and one order of vestigial attached shafts and chevrons on voussoirs.	II*
Danby Hall; 54.27974°N 1.75764°W		14th century	A country house that has been much altered and extended. It is in stone and has a Welsh slate roof with coped gables and finials. There are two storeys and an H-shaped plan. The entrance front has a range of five bays, the second and fourth bays projecting, and long flanking cross wings, above which is a pierced and balustraded parapet, at one point with pierced initials and a date, and the windows are cross windows. On the right wing is a 14th-century pele tower with mullioned windows and an embattled parapet. The garden front has eleven bays, and in the centre is a five-sided two-storey canted bay window. The end bays are square and are surmounted by octagonal turrets.	I
The Old Hall; 54.27969°N 1.72805°W	—	16th century	The house is in stone on a boulder plinth, with quoins and Welsh slate roof. There are two storeys and an L-shaped plan, with a main range of three bays and a rear wing. The windows are a mix of mullioned windows, casements, and horizontally sliding sashes. On the front is a doorway with chamfered jambs converted into a window, and on the rear wing is a porch containing a doorway with a moulded surround. The rear wing also has a massive projecting stepped chimney breast.	II
Danby Mill and Mill House; 54.27867°N 1.76648°W		17th century	A former watermill, with the house added at a right angle in the 19th century. They are in stone with hipped stone slate roofs and three storeys. The mill has three bays, the entrance has a chamfered quoined surround, and above the wheel chamber is an initialled and dated lintel. At the rear is a doorway with interrupted jambs and a keystone. The house has three bays, a doorway with a moulded surround with paterae, and a cornice, and the windows are sashes.	II
Manor Farmhouse; 54.27925°N 1.73222°W		17th century	The farmhouse is in stone, with quoins, and a stone slate roof with shaped kneelers and stone coping. There are two storeys and an E-shaped plan. On the central range is a doorway with a quoined surround and sash windows. The left wing contains mullioned and transomed windows, and on the apex of the gable is a finial. At the rear is a doorway with a chamfered quoined surround, and a triangular soffit to the lintel.	II
Ulshaw Bridge; 54.28045°N 1.77860°W		1674	The bridge carries a road over the River Ure. It is in stone, and consists of four segmental arches, one chamfered. The bridge has large triangular cutwaters, and rusticated parapets. The cutwaters rise to form refuges, most with stone seats. In central refuge on the upstream side is an octagonal sundial base with initials and a date.	II
Presbytery and stable 54.28120°N 1.77741°W		1695	The house is in roughcast stone on a stone plinth, with rusticated quoins, paired modillion gutter brackets, and a coped Welsh slate roof. There are two storeys and three bays. In the centre is a porch, and a doorway with a moulded surround, above which is the date. The windows are sashes with moulded surrounds. To the left is a single-storey coach house and stable containing a stable door and a segmental-arched coach opening.	II
Gate piers east of Danby Hall; 54.27972°N 1.75633°W	—	Late 17th to early 18th century	The gate piers to the east of the house are in stone with a cross plan, and are about 2 metres (6 ft 7 in) in height. They are rusticated and pulvinated with vermiculated panels, on a plain plinth, with scrollwork on the inner rebates at the top and bottom. Each pier has a cap with a cornice and a gadrooned urn finial.	II
Stable block and gate piers, Danby Hall; 54.28036°N 1.75706°W	—	Early 18th century	The stable block is in stone, with quoins, and hipped stone slate roofs. It forms three ranges round a courtyard and has two storeys. The main range has seven bays, the middle three bays taller and projecting. In the centre is a coach arch, partly infilled, and containing a doorway with a Baroque surround, a pulvinated frieze and an ogee scroll pediment. Above it is an oculus in a moulded surround containing an inscribed sundial. On the roof is a cupola with a clock, a lead ogee roof and a weathervane. Elsewhere, there are sash windows, stable doors and other doorways, and coach and carriage openings. Adjoining the left wing are stone gate piers, each with a cornice and a ball finial.	II
The Manse; 54.27919°N 1.73121°W	—	Early 18th century	The house is in stone, with rusticated quoins on the right, and an artificial slate roof with shaped kneelers and stone copings. There are two storeys, five bays, a rear wing and a rear outshut. On the front is a doorway with a moulded surround, above which is a weathered plaque. The windows are sashes, some with moulded surrounds. At the rear is a doorway with a moulded surround.	II
Guide Stone; 54.28641°N 1.75717°W		1712	The guide stone opposite Eagle Lodge is in sandstone, with five sides, and is about 1 metre (3 ft 3 in) in height. There are inscriptions on all faces, with the date on the face opposite Eagle Lodge.	II
Gate piers northeast of Danby Hall; 54.28005°N 1.75614°W		18th century	The gate piers flanking the drive are in rusticated stone, and are about 1.5 metres (4 ft 11 in) in height. Each pier has pulvination on alternate bands, Classical caps, and weathered ball finials.	II
Gate piers east of the stable block, Danby Hall; 54.28034°N 1.75651°W	—	18th century	The gate piers to the east of the stable block are in stone, with a square plan, and are about 2 metres (6 ft 7 in) in height. Each pier has a plinth, a cornice and an ogee finial on an ogee pedestal with a plain base.	II
Gates, piers and walls, Eagle Lodge; 54.28627°N 1.75712°W		Early 19th century	The gates at the entrance to the drive to Danby Hall are in wrought iron, and have a wheel motif at the base, scrolls below the mid-rail, fleurs-de-lis above the mid-rail, alternate wavy and straight bars, and fleurs-de-lis finials. The flanking piers are in rusticated stone, with ogee bases, classical cornices and ball finials. Outside these are curved coped walls ending in piers with ogee bases and classical cornices, surmounted by statues of eagles.	II
Fort Horn; 54.27948°N 1.72816°W		Early 19th century	A folly, later a private house, in stone with an embattled parapet and lead roofs. In the centre is a three-storey bay containing a full-height canted bay window. There is a doorway on the ground floor, and the windows are sashes. This is flanked by single-storey bays containing Venetian windows.	II
Terrace retaining wall, Danby Hall; 54.27943°N 1.75771°W	—	c. 1855	The retaining wall of the terrace to the south of the house is in stone, and surmounted by urns. At both ends are steps with balustrades.	II
St Simon and St Jude's Church; 54.28126°N 1.77737°W		1868	A Roman Catholic chapel in stone with a stone slate roof. There is an irregular cruciform plan, with the doorway in the southeast angle. On the western arm is an octagonal tower and belfry, with paired openings, stiff-leaf capitals, and a decorative tile roof. The openings have depressed round-arched heads, and under the chapel is an older crypt.	II
