= Masham Bridge =

Bridge in Masham, North Yorkshire, England

Coordinates: 54°13′34″N 1°39′17″W

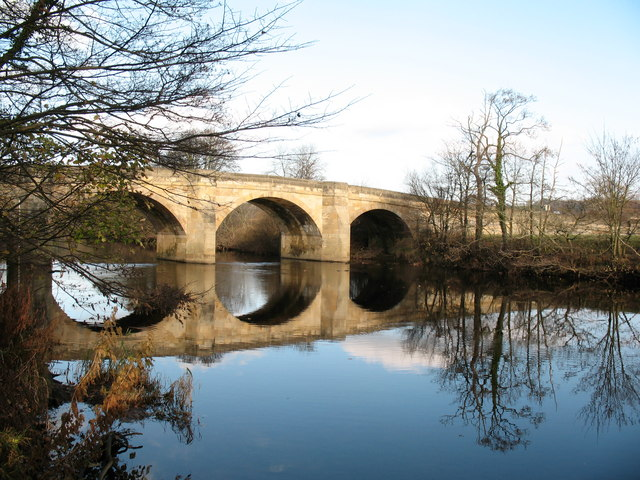
The bridge, in 2007

Masham Bridge is a historic structure in Masham, a town in North Yorkshire, in England.

In 1538, John Leland recorded a timber bridge over the River Ure in Masham. It was destroyed by a flood on 2 February 1732, and a new bridge built of stone was commissioned by Robert Carr. It was designed by his son, John Carr, and was completed in 1754. Brian Wragg describes it as "one of the finest bridges in Yorkshire". On 2 February 1822, it was badly damaged by a flood, but was repaired. It was grade II listed in 1966.

The bridge is built of stone and consists of four segmental arches with voussoirs. It has triangular cutwaters rising to canted refuges, a band and parapets.

== See also ==
- Listed buildings in Burton-on-Yore
- Listed buildings in Masham
- List of crossings of the River Ure

| Next bridge upstream | River Ure | Next bridge downstream |
| Kilgram Bridge | Kilgram Bridge; Grid reference SE2261181212 | Tanfield Bridge |
