= Thornton Steward Reservoir =

Reservoir in North Yorkshire, England

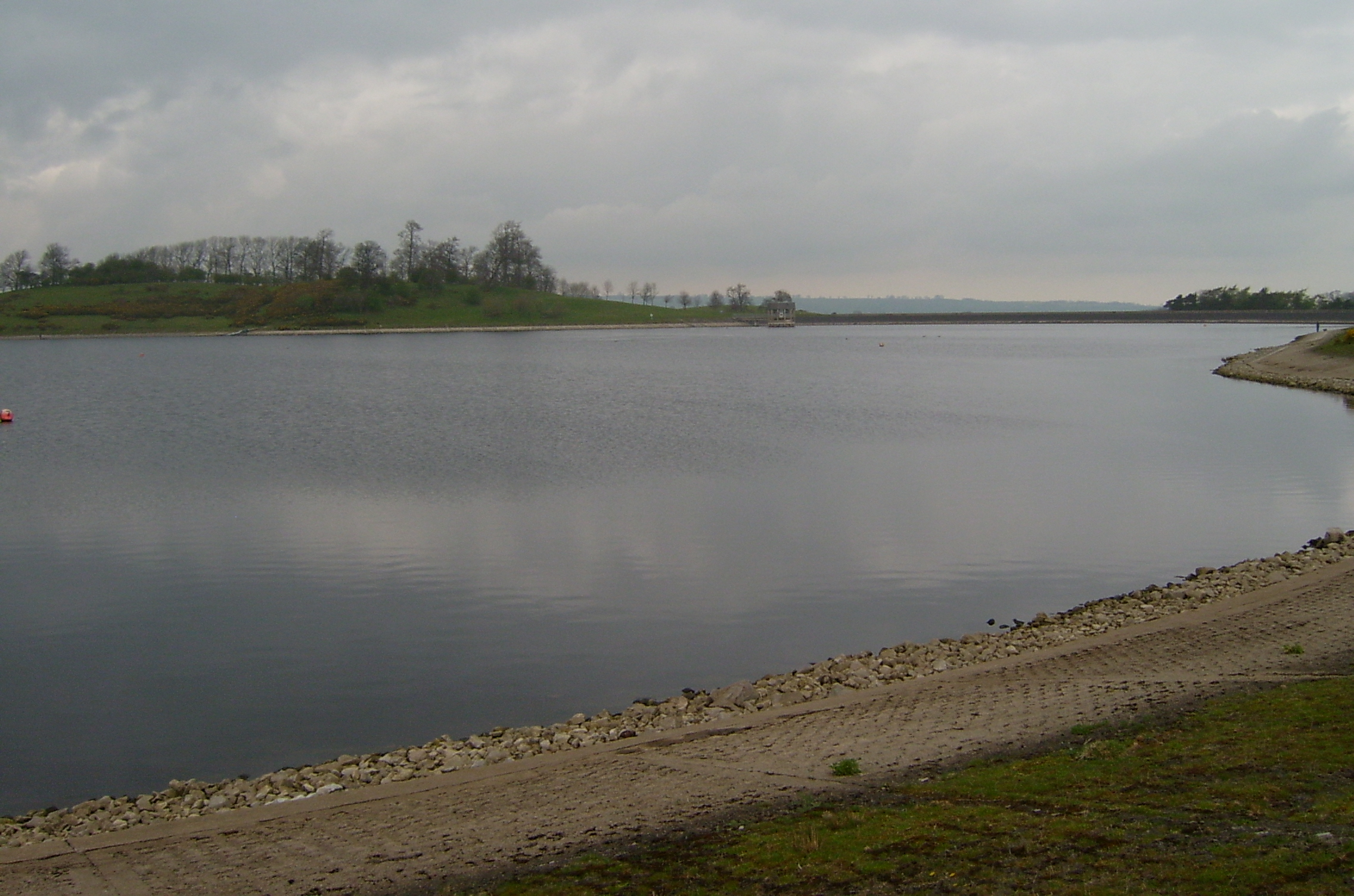
- Thornton Steward Reservoir

- Location within North Yorkshire
- Location: North Yorkshire, England
- Coordinates: 54°17′17″N 1°43′22″W
- Type: Reservoir
- Basin countries: United Kingdom
- Surface area: 33 acres (13 ha)
- Shore length^{1}: 0.9 miles (1.4 km)
- Surface elevation: 495 feet (151 m)
- ^{1} Shore length is not a well-defined measure.

Thornton Steward Reservoir is a reservoir north of the village of Thornton Steward in North Yorkshire, England. It is owned by Yorkshire Water, and supplies drinking water to Swaledale, Wensleydale, Northallerton, and Thirsk.

Thornton Steward Water Treatment Works (WTW) opened in 1977, and was refurbished in the 1990s. It was upgraded in 2003, and its mains connections improved in 2007, allowing Yorkshire Water to close older works in Langthwaite and at Cod Beck Reservoir above Osmotherley. The removal of the Langthwaite WTW, which was fed with groundwater from an adit, means that Thornton Steward now meets the needs of the Swaledale settlements formerly provided by Langthwaite.

The majority of the water from Thornton Steward is piped to a pumping station north of Ainderby Steeple and from there to Bullamoor Reservoir (a system of four covered concrete cisterns on the hillside east of Northallerton). That in turn supplies Northallerton and Thirsk.

The reservoir is fed from water pumped from the River Ure, which is extracted at Kilgram Bridge 1 mile (2 km) to the south. It is also supplied with water from Leighton Reservoir.

The reservoir is host to the Thornton Steward Sailing Club and is used for fly fishing.
