= Westwick =

Westwick may refer to:

== Places ==
=== United Kingdom ===
- Westwick, Cambridgeshire
- Westwick, County Durham
- Westwick, North Yorkshire
- Westwick, Norfolk

== People ==
- Bill Westwick (1908–1990), Canadian sports journalist
- Ed Westwick (b.1987), English actor and singer
- Rat Westwick (1876-1957), Canadian sportsman
- Thomas Westwick (1887-1963), Canadian ice hockey player

== See also ==
- Westwick Row, a place in Hertfordshire, England, United Kingdom
- West Wick, an area of Weston-super-Mare, Somerset, England, United Kingdom
