= Northbridge =

Northbridge or North Bridge may refer to:

== Places ==
Australia

- Northbridge, New South Wales, a suburb of Sydney
- Northbridge, Western Australia, a suburb of Perth
- Long Gully Bridge, a bridge between the Sydney suburbs of Cammeray and Northbridge

England

- North Bridge, Halifax
- North Bridge, Ripon

Poland

- North Bridge, Warsaw

Scotland

- North Bridge, Edinburgh, a bridge linking the old and new towns
- Northbridge, marketing name for residential developments in Sighthill, Glasgow

United States

- Northbridge, Massachusetts, a suburb of Worcester
- North Bridge (Harrisburg), crossing the Susquehanna River at Harrisburg, Pennsylvania
- The North Bridge, colloquially called the Old North Bridge, Concord, Massachusetts, focal point of the Battle of Concord
- Mark Morris Memorial Bridge, connecting Clinton, Iowa, and Fulton, Illinois

== Other uses ==
- Northbridge (computing), a chip that implements the "faster" capabilities of the motherboard

== See also ==
- Nordbrücke (disambiguation) (German for Northbridge)
