= Ulshaw Bridge =

Bridge in North Yorkshire, England

Coordinates: 54.2804°N 1.7787°W

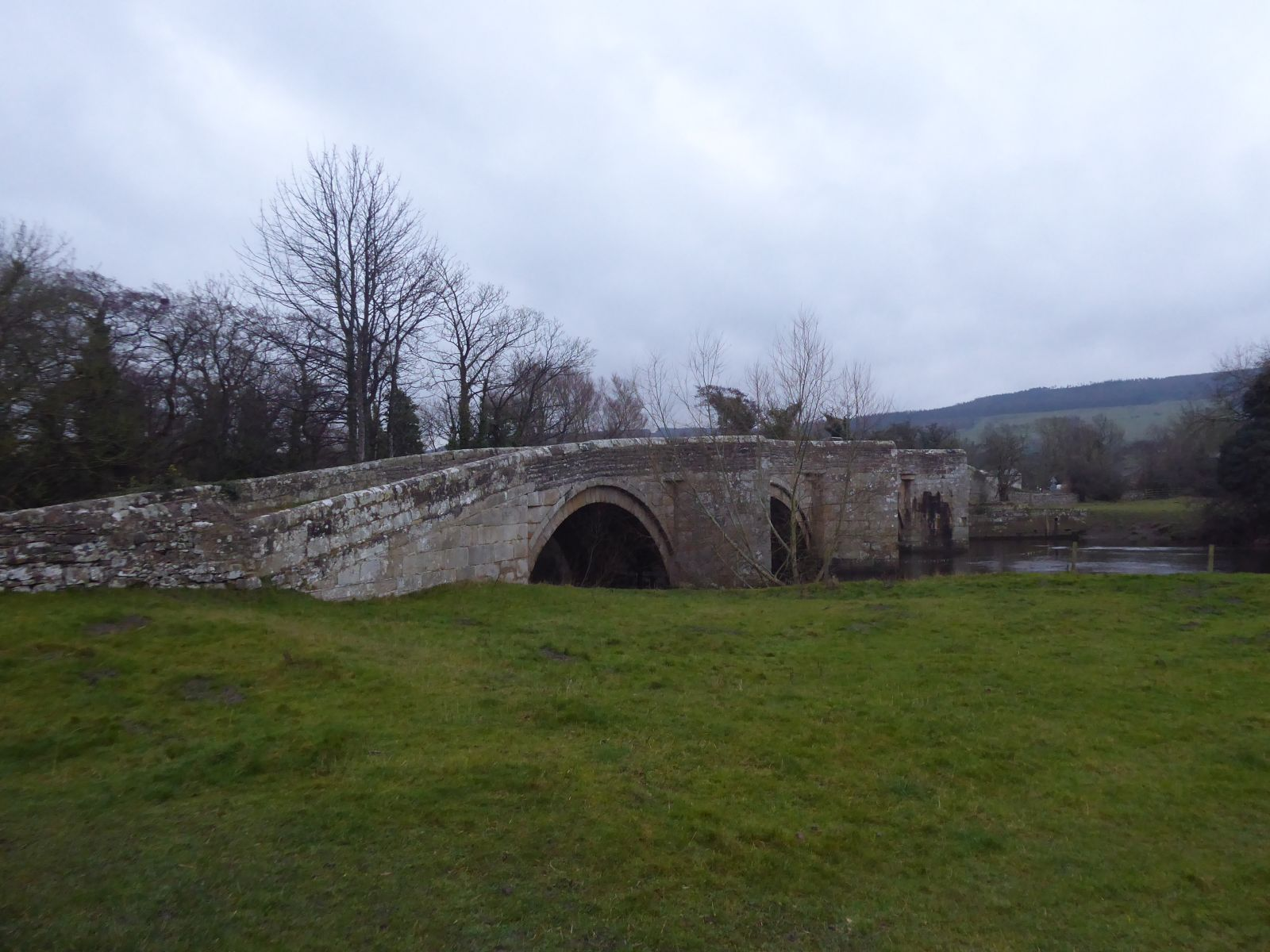
The bridge, in 2020

Ulshaw Bridge is a historic bridge in the hamlet of Ulshaw, in North Yorkshire, in England.

The bridge crosses the River Ure, east of Middleham, and so straddles the boundary of East Witton and Thornton Steward civil parishes. It has sometimes been described as lying on the line of a Roman road, although no such road has been located, and the discovery of a Roman fort in Wensley suggests that a more northerly route is likely. A wooden bridge over the Ure near Middleham was recorded by John Leland, although it is not certain whether it was on this site. The first definite reference to the bridge was in 1588, when 200 marks were spent repairing it.

The bridge was rebuilt between 1673 and 1674, at a cost of £1,000 (equivalent to £165,000 in 2025). The new bridge spanned 65 feet (20 m), and was 12 feet (3.7 m) wide. The parapets were later rebuilt, probably in the late 19th century. Nikolaus Pevsner described the bridge as "an impressive job with three pairs of mighty cutwaters".

The bridge, which carries a minor road, is built of a mixture of carved stone and rubble. It consists of four segmental arches, one with a chamfered surround, and with rusticated parapets. There are triangular cutwaters rising to refuges, two with seats, the middle one containing an octagonal sundial base with initials and the date. It has been a scheduled monument since 1925, and was grade II listed in 1967.

== See also ==
- Listed buildings in East Witton
- Listed buildings in Thornton Steward
- List of crossings of the River Ure

Next bridge upstream	River Ure	Next bridge downstream
Middleham Bridge	Ulshaw Bridge; Grid reference SE1451987226	Kilgram Bridge
