= Ulshaw =

Hamlet in North Yorkshire, England

Coordinates: 54°16′52″N 1°46′42″W

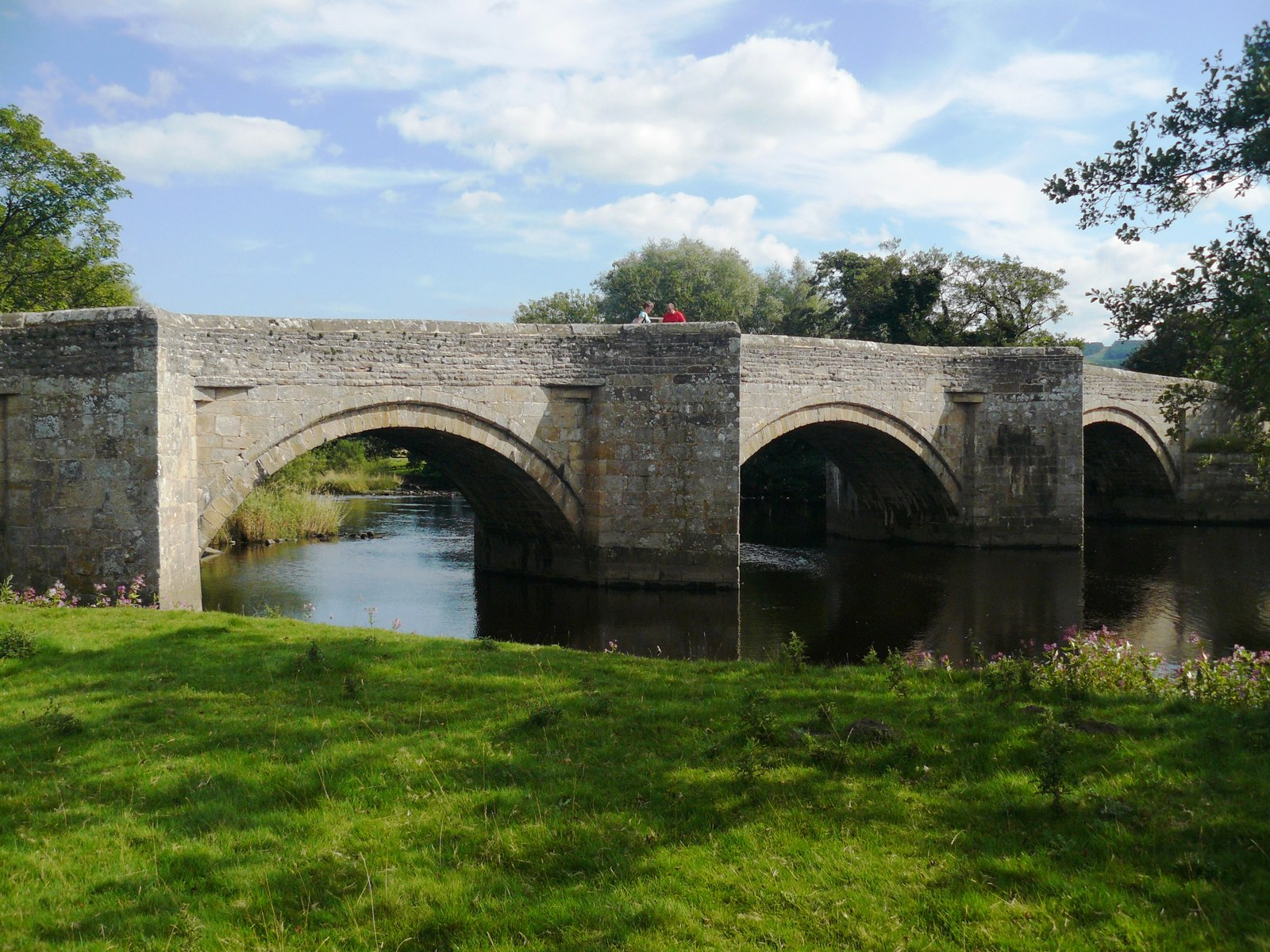
- Bridge over the River Ure at Ulshaw

- Location within North Yorkshire
- Civil parish: Thornton Steward
- Unitary authority: North Yorkshire
- Ceremonial county: North Yorkshire
- Region: Yorkshire and the Humber
- Country: England
- Sovereign state: United Kingdom
- Post town: LEYBURN
- Postcode district: DL8
- Police: North Yorkshire
- Fire: North Yorkshire
- Ambulance: Yorkshire

Ulshaw is a hamlet on the River Ure, in the civil parish of Thornton Steward, in North Yorkshire, England, near to Middleham. The hamlet was historically in the North Riding of Yorkshire. It was historically also referred to as Ulshaw Bridge, but in modern usage that name is generally reserved for the medieval stone bridge which spans the River Ure to the immediate south of the hamlet. Ulshaw Bridge is 2.5 miles (4 km) west of Thornton Steward, and 1.25 miles (2 km) east of Middleham.

== History ==
The hamlet of Ulshaw was included in East Witton parish in 1717. It is shown on mapping as being on either side of Ulshaw Bridge, straddling the River Ure, so split between the parishes of Thornton Steward and East Witton, though most houses and the Catholic church are on the north bank of the river. The name Ulshaw is first recorded in 1158 as Wolueshowe, which is believed to have derived from the Old Norse of Ulf and Haugr (Ulf's mound). Ulshaw has been mentioned as the possible location where Oswin, King of Deira, dismissed his army so that he could retire to a monastery. However Speight states that this is a mis-recording, and that the location is 10 miles (16 km) to the north west of Catterick, not the south west.

In 1563, when the Black Death ravaged nearby East Witton, the market was moved from there and held at Ulshaw Bridge instead, however it was noted as having been unable to be resurrected at East Witton. The bridge itself is undated, though it has been recorded that Ralph Neville, 1st Earl of Westmorland left £20 in his will of 1424 towards the building of the bridge, described as the "Houseway Bridge over the [River] Eure". The structure was originally believed to have been built in timber, but was constructed of stone between 1673 and 1674, the bridge was repaired at a cost of £1,000, (equivalent to £165,000 in 2025). Ulshaw Bridge is believed to have been a crossing point since Roman times, and it is now grade II listed, including a sundial located above one of the piers. The Roman Road which crossed at this point, is believed to have led towards Addlebrough.

St Simon and St Jude's Church, Ulshaw Bridge, is to the east of the bridge and is unusual to be a Catholic church in a small North Yorkshire hamlet. This is because the church, which was rebuilt c. 1867–1868 by Joseph Hansom in the Byzantine style, is a direct replacement for the Catholic chapel at nearby Danby Hall, seat of the Scrope family. The Scropes are a Catholic family and maintained the tradition despite being labelled as recusants since the time of Elizabeth I. The present church building is accessed by an open staircase which leads to a south door. The church is grade II listed and the tower is prominent in the landscape.

Historically, the hamlet was in the manor of Wensley (recorded in 1277), and was listed as being in the wapentake of Hang West, and the parish of East Witton. Ulshaw is now within the civil parish of Thornton Steward.

Ulshaw Bridge is also the name of a racehorse, named after the bridge over the river, which has been trained by James Bethell at nearby Middleham.

== See also ==
- Listed buildings in Thornton Steward
