= St Simon and St Jude's Church, Ulshaw Bridge =

Catholic church in Ulshaw Bridge, a hamlet in North Yorkshire, England

St Simon and St Jude's Church
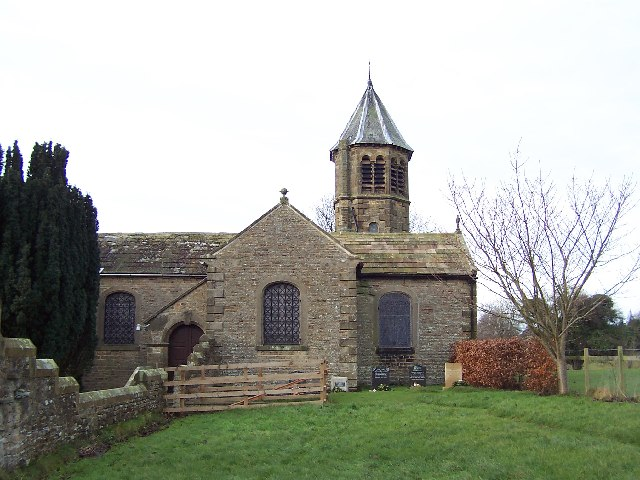
- The church in 2006
- St Simon and St Jude's Church
- 54.2813°N 1.7773°W
- OS grid reference: SE 14597 87318
- Location: Ulshaw, North Yorkshire
- Country: England
- Denomination: Catholic

History
- Status: Church

Architecture
- Architect: Joseph Hansom

St Simon and St Jude's Church is a Catholic church in Ulshaw, a hamlet in North Yorkshire, in England.

Danby Hall was the home of the Scrope family, which remained Catholic after the English Reformation, and celebrated mass covertly in the house. In the early 18th century, Simon Scrope built a cockpit behind the house. It was later closed, and in 1788, the family built a Catholic chapel on the site. The building included a crypt, into which the family's coffins were relocated. In 1865, Joseph Hansom rebuilt the church in the Byzantine style, creating a larger building which was linked to the presbytery. It was grade II listed in 1985.

The church is built of stone, and has a stone slate roof. It has a cruciform plan with transepts, but is not symmetrical, and the liturgical east is actually to the north. It has a doorway in the south-east angle, reached up a flight of steps, and an octagonal tower and belfry at the west end. There is a three-light north window. The 18th-century crypt survives.

== See also ==
- Listed buildings in Thornton Steward
