= Kilgram Bridge =

Bridge in North Yorkshire, England

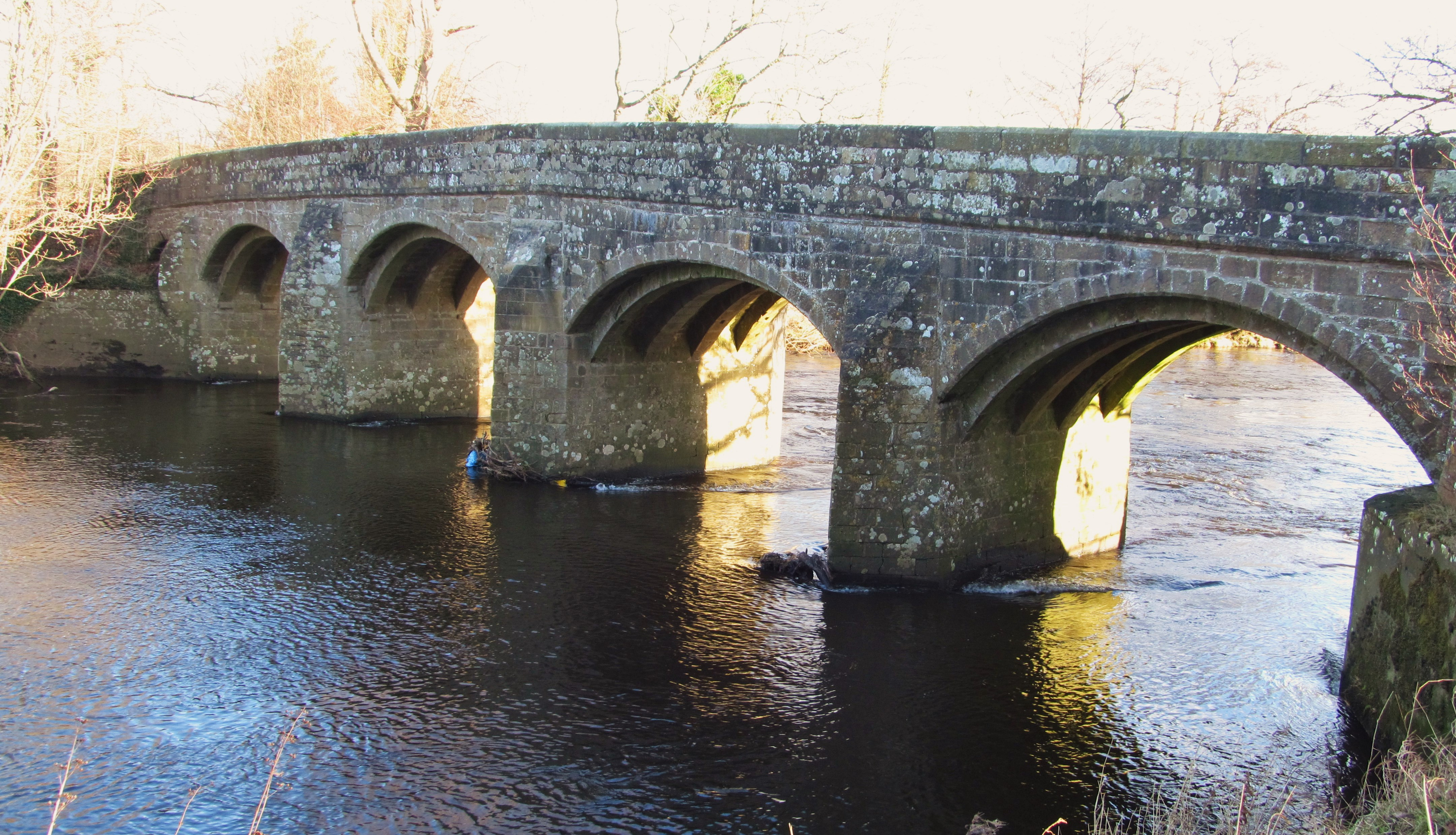
- Coordinates: 54.269°N 1.707°W
- OS grid reference: SE191860
- Carries: Unclassified road
- Crosses: River Ure
- Locale: East Witton, North Yorkshire
- Heritage status: Scheduled monument

Characteristics
- Total length: 130 feet (40 m)
- Width: 15 feet (4.6 m)
- No. of spans: 6
- Piers in water: 3

History
- Opened: c. 1100

Location
- Interactive map of Kilgram Bridge

Kilgram Bridge is a crossing point across the River Ure in North Yorkshire, England. The bridge, which has six arches, is thought to date back to the 12th century, and it is thought that it is built on the old Roman ford crossing point of the river. Kilgram bridge is traditionally associated as being at the eastern and lower end of Wensleydale and is now a scheduled monument.

== History ==
Kilgram Bridge is 4 miles (6.4 km) south-east of Middleham, and the site has been known as a crossing point over the River Ure since Roman times. The bridge follows the route of a paved Roman ford across the river which connected Catterick camp with Roman roads to the south side of Wensleydale. It is believed that the bridge was built sometime between the founding of Richmond Castle in 1070 and the building of Jervaulx Abbey in 1145. An old rhyme states:

Of Kilgram Bridge we now did talk, And I had an answer given, That here a bridge was of stone work, In hundred years eleven.

The monks of Jervaulx Abbey situated one of their granges (Kilgrim Grange, later Kilgram Grange) 460 feet (140 m) south of the bridge.

John Leland, who visited the area in the 16th century commented that "..about a mile benethe Gervalx Abbay, is a gret old bridge of stone over Ure, caullyd Kilgram Bridge." Hatcher notes that is significant that even in the late 16th century, the bridge was considered old. Not long after Leland had visited, the Elizabethan authorities granted £30 (equivalent to £10,000 in 2025) to the upkeep of the bridge. The bridge was again awarded funds for repairs in the 17th century. A cattle plague during the middle of the 18th century resulted in the bridge being watched by one man during the day and two men at night, to make sure farmers did not move their herds around. Justices sitting in Northallerton awarded payments of £8 and 10 Shillings for the watch between December 1748 and February 1749.

The name Kilgram derives from Old Norse and is a personal name. However, a folklore story about how the bridge acquired its name states a different derivation. The place where the bridge is built was notorious for fast flowing water or for flooding, so the devil is said to have promised to build an indestructible bridge, on the condition that when he had finished the bridge, the first living thing to cross the bridge would belong to him. When the bridge was complete, a local shepherd swam across and on reaching the other side, whistled for his dog (named Grim), who on crossing was killed by the devil (hence Kil-Grim). Over the years, this has become Kilgram, rather than Kilgrim. Another twist on the story is that one of the stones from the bridge parapet was removed, so the bridge was never actually finished, leaving the devil unable to collect his prize.

The bridge is 300 feet (91 m) above sea level, extends for 130 feet (40 m) across the river and is 15 feet (4.6 m) wide. The two end arches are 9 feet (2.7 m) in span, whilst the middle four arches are 21 feet (6.4 m) across. Kilgram Bridge is now a scheduled monument, listed with Historic England. It has six ribbed segmental arches, with three of the piers standing in the water. The old Roman paved ford that crosses at the same point can be seen underneath the bridge in times of low river flow.

Near to the bridge is a pumping station which abstracts water from the River Ure and pumps it up to Thornton Steward Reservoir. Between 1967 and 2004, the water flow rate underneath the bridge was 559 cubic feet per second (15.84 m^{3}/s). The highest water level recorded here was in February 1995, when the water reached 18.5 feet (5.64 m).

Traditionally, the bridge marks the eastern and lower end of Wensleydale. The waters of the River Ure travel some 26 miles (42 km) from Moorcock Inn to Kilgram Bridge dropping from 1,001 feet (305 m) above sea level at the Moorcock Inn, to 300 feet (90 m) at Kilgram Bridge - a descent of 705 feet (215 m).

Kilgram Bridge is 1.4 miles (2.2 km) south of Thornton Steward, and 3.5 miles (5.6 km) east of the village of East Witton, in which parish it resides.

== See also ==
- List of crossings of the River Ure

Next bridge upstream	River Ure	Next bridge downstream
Ulshaw Bridge	Kilgram Bridge; Grid reference SE1913586002	Masham Bridge
