= Ure Bank =

Suburb of Ripon, North Yorkshire, England

Coordinates: 54.145°N 1.515°W

- Suburb
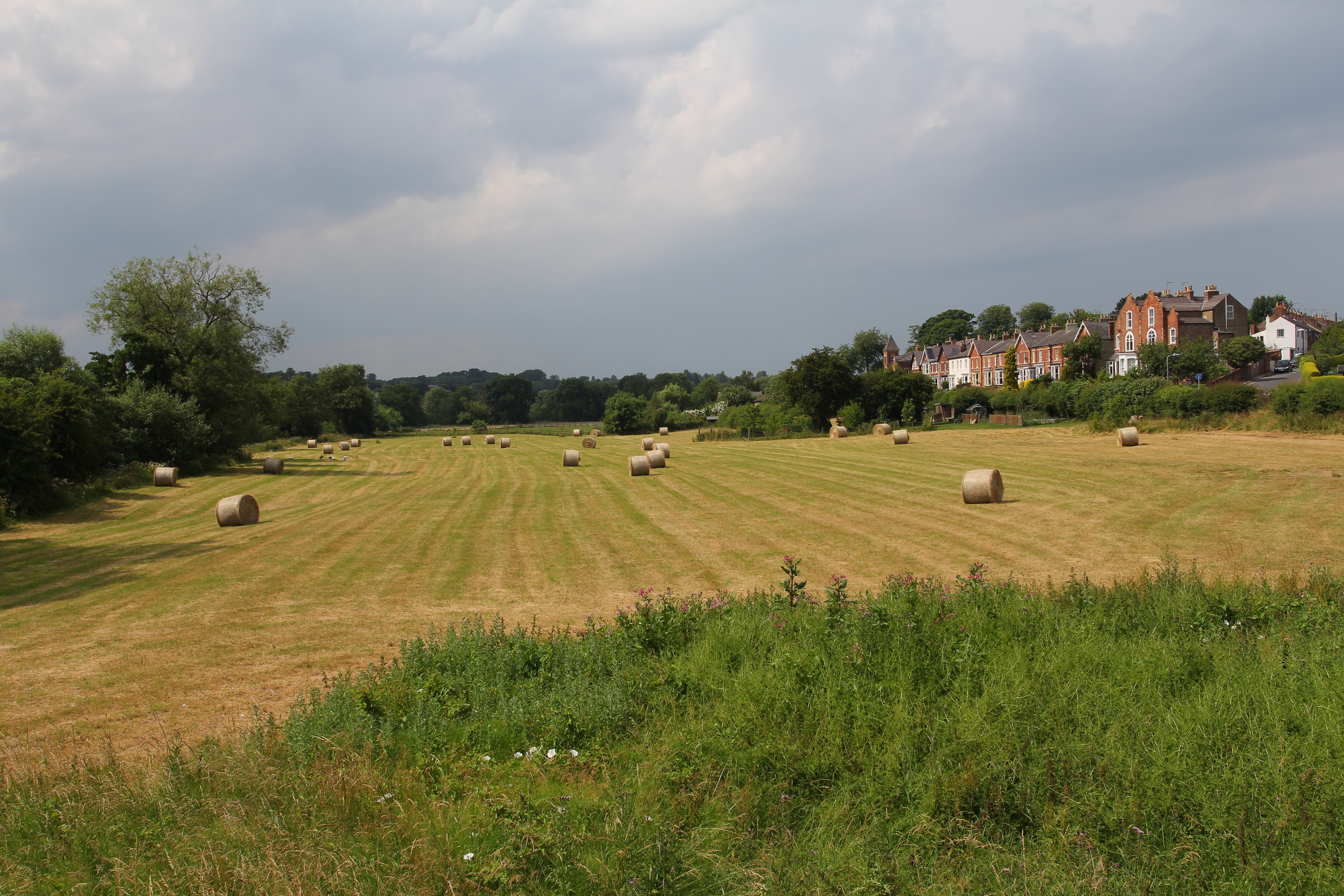
- Ure Bank, Ripon

- Location within North Yorkshire
- OS grid reference: SE317724
- Civil parish: Ripon
- Unitary authority: North Yorkshire
- Ceremonial county: North Yorkshire
- Region: Yorkshire and the Humber
- Country: England
- Sovereign state: United Kingdom
- Post town: RIPON
- Postcode district: HG4
- Police: North Yorkshire
- Fire: North Yorkshire
- Ambulance: Yorkshire
- UK Parliament: Skipton and Ripon constituency

Ure Bank is a suburb of the city of Ripon, in North Yorkshire, England. It developed as a small settlement in the nineteenth century before being officially included as part of the city in the early years of the 20th century, and is located 1 mile (1.6 km) north of Ripon city centre, across the River Ure. Historically, the suburb was the site of an army camp and the location of Ripon's railway station.

== History ==
In June 1848, the railway station for Ripon opened in Ure bank which is 1-mile (1.6 km) north of Ripon city centre. It was located in Ure Bank as the railway initially approached the city from the north, and the geological problems with the gypsum sinkholes (see below), meant that the railway to the south over Ure Viaduct could not open until later in the same year and so the siting of the railway station was north of the river. The location of the railway station north of the river helped a settlement develop around the station environs. Many housing terraces developed along the southern and western edge of the suburb, such as Ure Bank Terrace, which has suffered from sinkholes. The houses along Ure Bank Terrace has been described as having ".. a pleasant south view over the river."

Initially, it was in the township of Sharow, and was listed in 1893 as having a population of 265, with the largest landowners in the area being the North Eastern Railway and the Marquis of Ripon. At that time, the largest non-housing concerns were the railway and the maltings, which is now a grade II listed building. A map from 1850 shows the settlement being in the parish of Sharow, with the border of the parish of Ripon running through the river. Even though the river was the traditional border between the old West and North Ridings, the border between the two counties on the map is just above the settlement of Ure Bank, it being a part of the old Wapentake of Claro. It was adopted into the city of Ripon in the early part of the 20th century.

In 1925, the city applied for funding from the Ministry of Health to purchase over 987 acres (399 ha) of land in Ripon and Ure Bank to establish a territorial army training camp. During the Second World War, a regular army camp for infantry was located in the suburb. There was also a transit camp for troops arriving into, and leaving the city's other camps by means of the railway station. This later became a Prisoner-of-war camp. Many of the ex- German prisoners-of-war formed the Bremen Society of Ripon and used to regularly visit the town. The old military camp became a caravan and chalet site after closure, which the council sold off to a private company in 1980.

The area is subject to sinkholes opening up in the ground, much like other areas within the city of Ripon. This is due to the presence of gypsum rock underground, which is eroded quicker than limestone under the action of water, and makes Ripon susceptible to sinkholes. The area around Ure Bank has recorded more than nine sinkholes appearing between 1834 and 1999. One sinkhole which opened up at Ure Bank in 1834 is said to have possibly inspired Lewis Carroll for the hole that Alice falls down in Alice in Wonderland. The bridge over the River Ure (North Bridge) has a water monitoring station, and the highest level it has recorded was 3.86 metres (12.7 ft) on 26 September 2012.

Buses do go past the southern end of Ure Bank as they exit and arrive in the city to and from the north. However, one service, the RS4, runs four times a day around Ure Bank and the caravan parks in a circular route to and from Ripon Bus Station. The suburb falls under the civil parish of Ripon and within the Skipton and Ripon constituency.
