= The Mount, North Yorkshire =

Historic structure in North Yorkshire, England

The Mount
- Polly Peachum's Tower
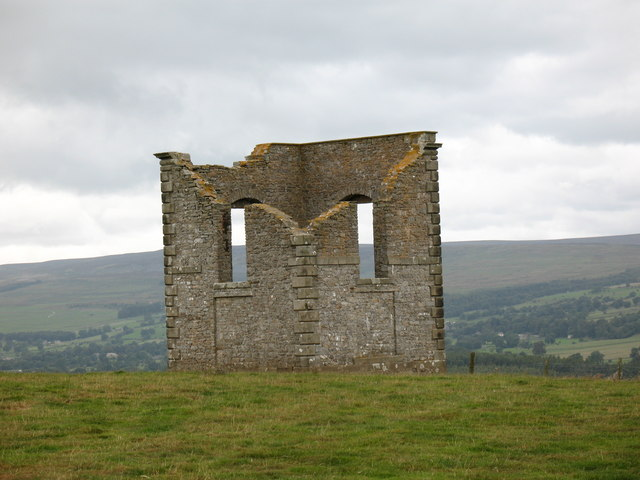
- The tower in 2007, viewed from the south-east

- Location within North Yorkshire
- 54°17′21.19″N 1°52′16.21″W
- Location: near Wensley, North Yorkshire.
- OS grid reference: SE 08484 88185

Listed Building – Grade II
- Designated: 5 February 2021
- Reference no.: 1473948

The Mount, or Polly Peachum's Tower, is a hunting tower near Wensley and about a mile south-east of Bolton Hall, in North Yorkshire, England. It is a Grade II listed building.

== History ==
The tower was probably built in the late 17th or early 18th century, by the 1st Duke or 2nd Duke of Bolton. It is shown on a map of 1723, when it stood in unenclosed parkland, thought to have been used for hunting. The tower was presumably built as a hunting tower, and also perhaps to make the view from Bolton Hall, about a mile to the north-west across a valley, more picturesque.

In an estate plan of 1737, it is shown with a cupola, standing in a square enclosure. In the 1790s it is referred to in letters as "the Temple in Mount Park" and is regarded as a folly.

It is known as "Polly Peachums's Tower", after Lavinia Fenton, an actress and singer who played Polly Peachum in the original production in 1728 of The Beggar's Opera. Charles Powlett, 3rd Duke of Bolton, had separated from his wife a few weeks after their wedding in 1713, and in 1728 he fell in love with Lavinia Fenton. They lived together happily and discreetly, and they had three sons. They married in 1751. It is thought that they seldom used the Bolton estate, but the tower may have been refurbished for Lavinia Fenton, giving rise to a story that the tower was built to celebrate their marriage.

The Bolton Estate is owned by the Duke's descendants, the Orde-Powlett family.

== Description ==
As seen in 2021, the tower is partially ruinous and has no roof. It is built of coursed limestone (Great Scar limestone) with ashlar dressings. It is square and has two storeys, the first floor, which is higher than the ground floor, has is a large window at the centre of each wall. A third of the south-east corner has collapsed, and the tops of the south and east windows are missing.

In April 2021, the owners of the Bolton estate applied for planning permission to bring the tower back into use as a small entertainment space, honouring its original purpose by using it to host shooting lunches for their guests.

== See also ==
- Listed buildings in Wensley, North Yorkshire
