= Middleham Bridge =

Bridge in North Yorkshire, England

Coordinates: 54°17′39″N 1°49′07″W

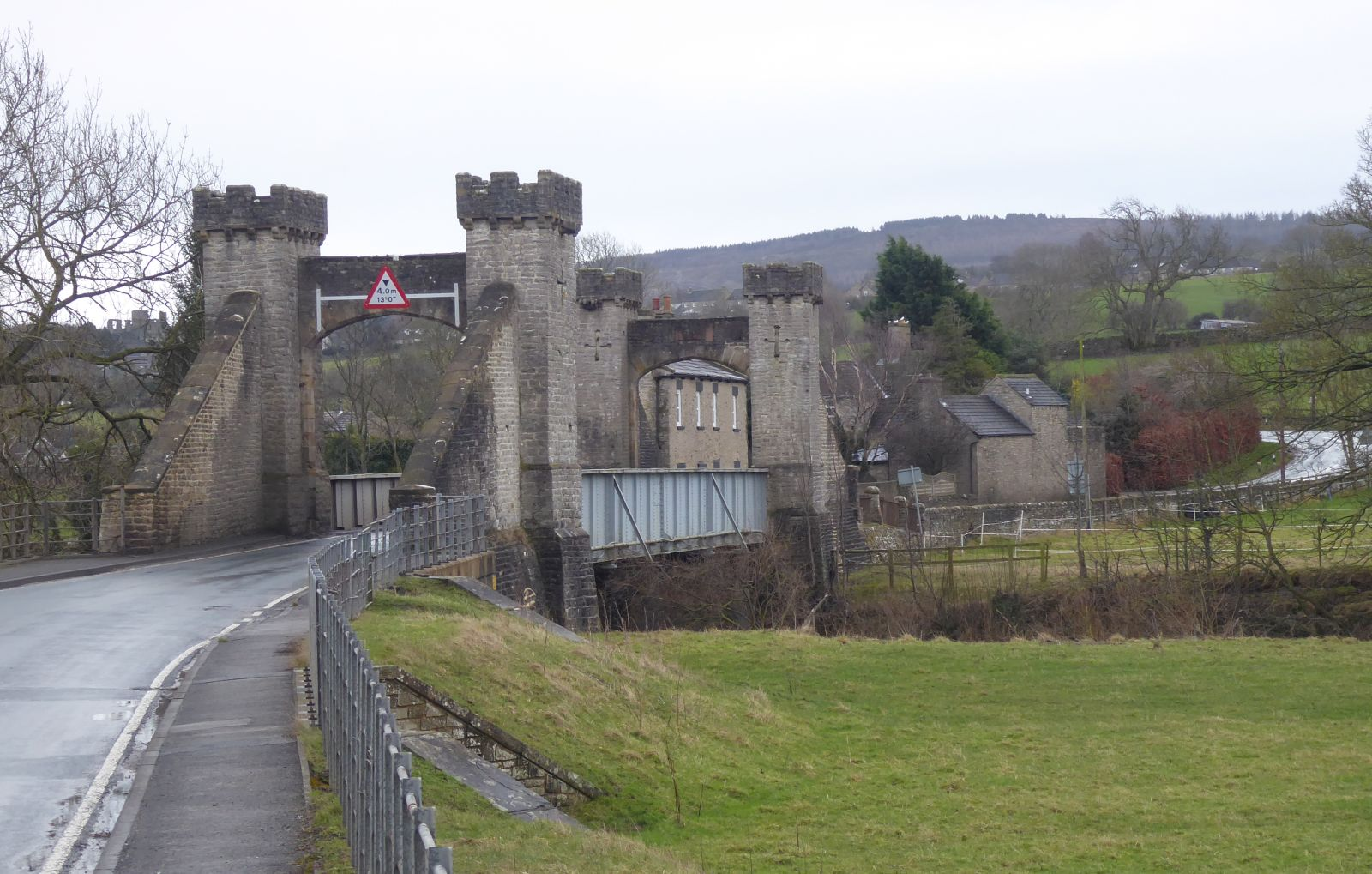
The bridge, in 2020

Middleham Bridge is a historic structure connecting Middleham and Leyburn in North Yorkshire, in England.

The bridge, across the River Ure, was constructed in 1830, to a design by Joseph Hansom and Edward Welch. It was originally a suspension bridge, but was soon damaged by cattle crossing in step. It was repaired and a toll was introduced to pay for its upkeep. In 1865 it was converted into a girder bridge, the work conducted by Head, Ashby and Co. The bridge was grade II listed in 1985. It carries what is now the A6108 road.

At each end of the bridge is a pair of stone pylons with a rectangular plan, buttresses, and embattled parapets on corbels. They are joined by a four-centred arch carrying a stone wall, each with shield and panels, some with inscriptions. The bridge deck is in cast and wrought iron, on two cast iron columns into the river bed, with wrought iron parapets and inscribed panels.

== See also ==
- Listed buildings in Leyburn
- Listed buildings in Middleham
- List of crossings of the River Ure

Next bridge upstream	River Ure	Next bridge downstream
Wensley Bridge	Middleham Bridge; Grid reference SE1190188756	Ulshaw Bridge
