= Nordbrücke =

Nordbrücke (German for North Bridge) may refer to:

- Nordbrücke, a bridge in Kaiserbrücke, Mainz, Germany
- Theodor Heuss Bridge (Düsseldorf), a bridge over the Rhine River in Düsseldorf built in the 1950s
- Nordbrücke, a bowstring arch bridge in Marktheidenfeld, Bavaria, Germany
- Nordbrücke (Vienna) (de) - see Transportation in Vienna

== See also ==
- Northbridge (disambiguation)
