= North Bridge, Ripon =

Bridge in North Yorkshire, England

North Bridge
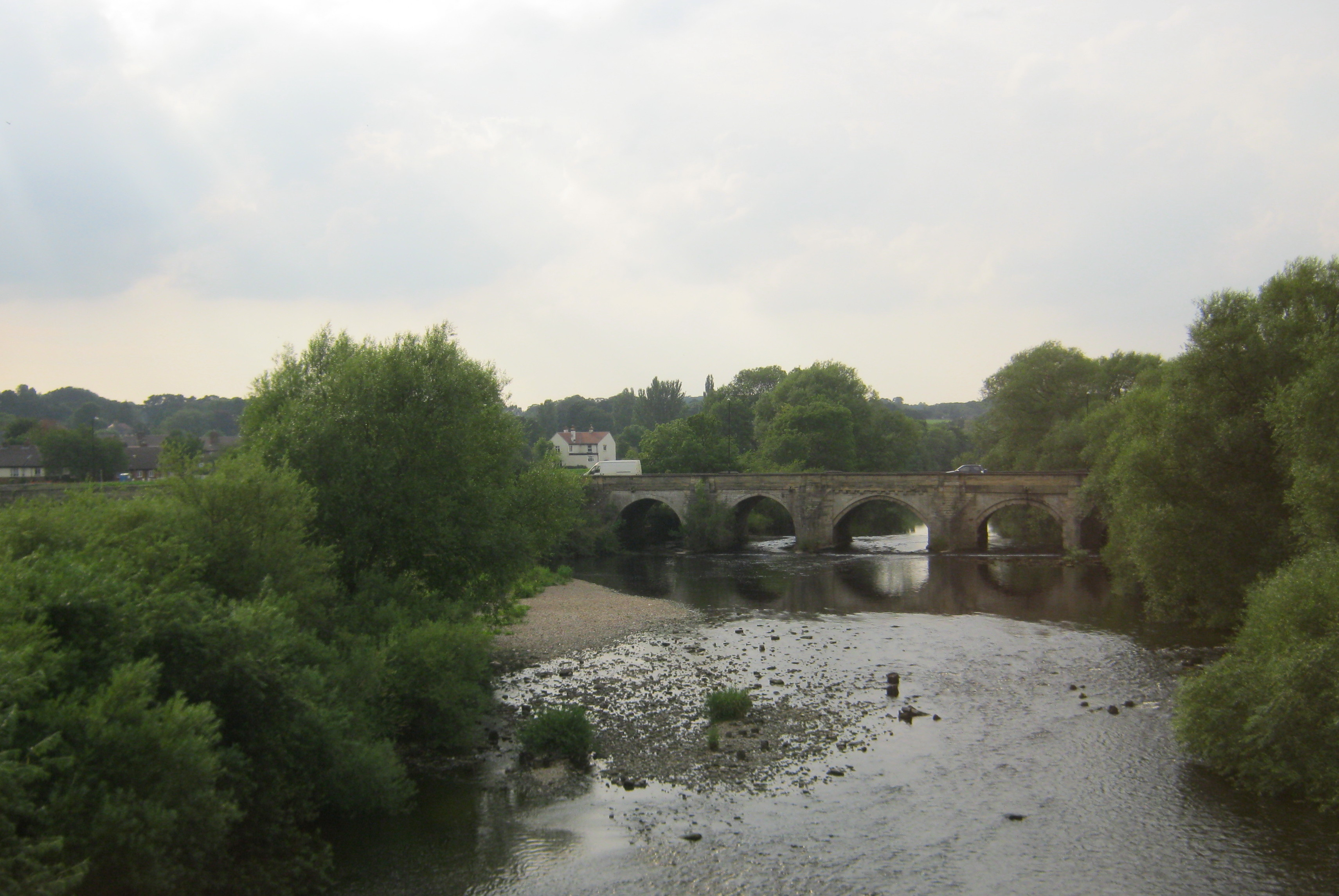
- North Bridge over the River Ure in Ripon
- Coordinates: 54.1436°N 1.5153°W
- OS grid reference: SE317720
- Carries: A6108 road
- Crosses: River Ure
- Locale: Ripon, North Yorkshire, England
- Preceded by: Tanfield Bridge
- Followed by: Duchess of Kent Bridge (A61) (Note: Until 1848, the next bridge downstream was at Copt Hewick. Between 1848 and 1972, it was the Ure Viaduct, then between 1972 and 1996, it was again, Copt Hewick Bridge. Since the bypass opened in 1996, it has been the Duchess of Kent Bridge (the A61), so named after the dignitary who opened the bridge.)

Location
- Interactive map of North Bridge

North Bridge is a grade II listed road crossing over the River Ure in Ripon, North Yorkshire, England. The bridge dates back to medieval times, though its exact date of construction is unknown. It used to carry the A61 road into and out of Ripon, but now carries the A6108 road.

== History ==
The bridge, which is now a grade II listed structure, is probably mentioned in a document from 1242. The first authentic mention is in 1309 and the bridge is thought to have the oldest masonry within Ripon's city limits. Three inhabitants of the city requested permission from Edward III to charge tolls for using the bridges into the city. The king granted them to take tolls from all traffic crossing all bridges "...to aid of repairing and mending the bridges of Ripon called Hewelbrigge, Northbrigg, and Risbrig." It was afforded funds for repair in 1360 by the Bishop of Ripon. Additionally, in 1485, Dame Margaret Pygot, the abbess of Carrow Abbey, left 20 shillings for the "reparacion [sic] of the Northbrig [sic]." All of this was still not enough, and along with the bridge at Copt Hewick, they had chapels built on, or quite near to the bridges to collect tolls. The chapel at North Bridge was dedicated to St Sitha and collected over 11 shillings in 1478. The church was in charge of overseeing the bridge, and many others in Ripon, as they connected the cathedral with Fountains Abbey, the minster at York and the cathedral at Durham. The responsibility for the bridge was handed over to local government during the Reformation.

In 1608, the bridge was described as being "..in great decay and ruinous." Traditionally, the River Ure was the dividing line between the old West and North Ridings of Yorkshire. As the bridge straddled the division between the two areas, it was decided in 1621 that responsibility for the upkeep of the bridge would fall to the West Riding, even though the line of demarcation between the two counties was on the first arch of the bridge on the south side. The bridge has seven arches, some are semi-circular, some segmented and some are pointed, with the stone for the refurbished bridge being sourced from Pool Bank Quarries. In 1958, members of a local sub-aqua club discovered ancient timbers upstream of the bridge which were thought to be part of one of the former crossing structures.

The bridge was widened between 1801 and 1803, being extended on the upstream side, by Bernard Hartley, the West Riding of Yorkshire surveyor of bridges at a cost of £1,255. It was widened again between 1879 and 1881, effectively being doubled in size from 14 feet 9 inches (4.50 m) to 29 feet 9 inches (9.07 m). The cost was estimated at around £6,000, of which Ripon city was expected to contribute £1,600, and the North Eastern Railway, whose Ripon railway station lay on the north side of the bridge, £250. Although at a skew angle to the bridge, it is believed that Stonebridgegate in the city is named after North Bridge, rather than any other bridges. Both sides of the river crossing have been developed from the 19th century onwards; council housing was built south of the bridge, and Ure Bank, on the north side, had an accelerated development due to the railway station being built there.

During the First World War, the street lamps on the bridge were fitted with a remote apparatus so that they lights could be turned off in the event of an air raid. Since the Ripon bypass opened in 1996 some 660 feet (200 m) south-east of North Bridge, the A61 road was diverted onto the new road, and the A6108 extended across North Bridge to connect with the A61 bypass on the north bank of the River Ure. A bypass to North Bridge was first proposed in October 1939, and the plans of 1987 envisaged using North Bridge rather than building a newer one over the river.

== Water levels ==
Serious floods have occurred on the river and inundated the bridge; the level of the water in 1883 is recorded on a plaque on the bridge side. The water monitoring stations highest level that it has recorded in the 21st century is 3.86 metres (12.7 ft), which it recorded on 26 September 2012. In response to flooding around Ripon, the Environment Agency completed some works in 2014 which included clearing debris from the flood arches of North Bridge, raising some road levels and raising the earthen banks to the north of the bridge to 13 feet (4 m) in height.

== See also ==
- Listed buildings in Ripon
- List of crossings of the River Ure

== Notes ==
Next bridge upstream	River Ure	Next bridge downstream
Tanfield Bridge	North Bridge; Grid reference SE3175272084	Duchess of Kent Bridge
