= Westwick, North Yorkshire =

Civil parish in North Yorkshire, England

Coordinates: 54.0934°N 1.4683°W

Westwick
- Location within North Yorkshire
- Population: 10
- OS grid reference: SE349664
- Unitary authority: North Yorkshire
- Ceremonial county: North Yorkshire
- Region: Yorkshire and the Humber
- Country: England
- Sovereign state: United Kingdom
- Post town: HARROGATE
- Postcode district: HG3
- Dialling code: 01765
- Police: North Yorkshire
- Fire: North Yorkshire
- Ambulance: Yorkshire
- UK Parliament: Skipton and Ripon

Westwick is a civil parish in the county of North Yorkshire, England. It lies 3 miles (5 km) west of Boroughbridge, on the south bank of the River Ure. It is a small parish of only 422 acres (171 ha), and consists of a few scattered houses. In 2012 the population of the parish was estimated at 10. As the population was less than 100 at the 2011 Census details are included by ONS in the civil parish of Skelton-on-Ure.

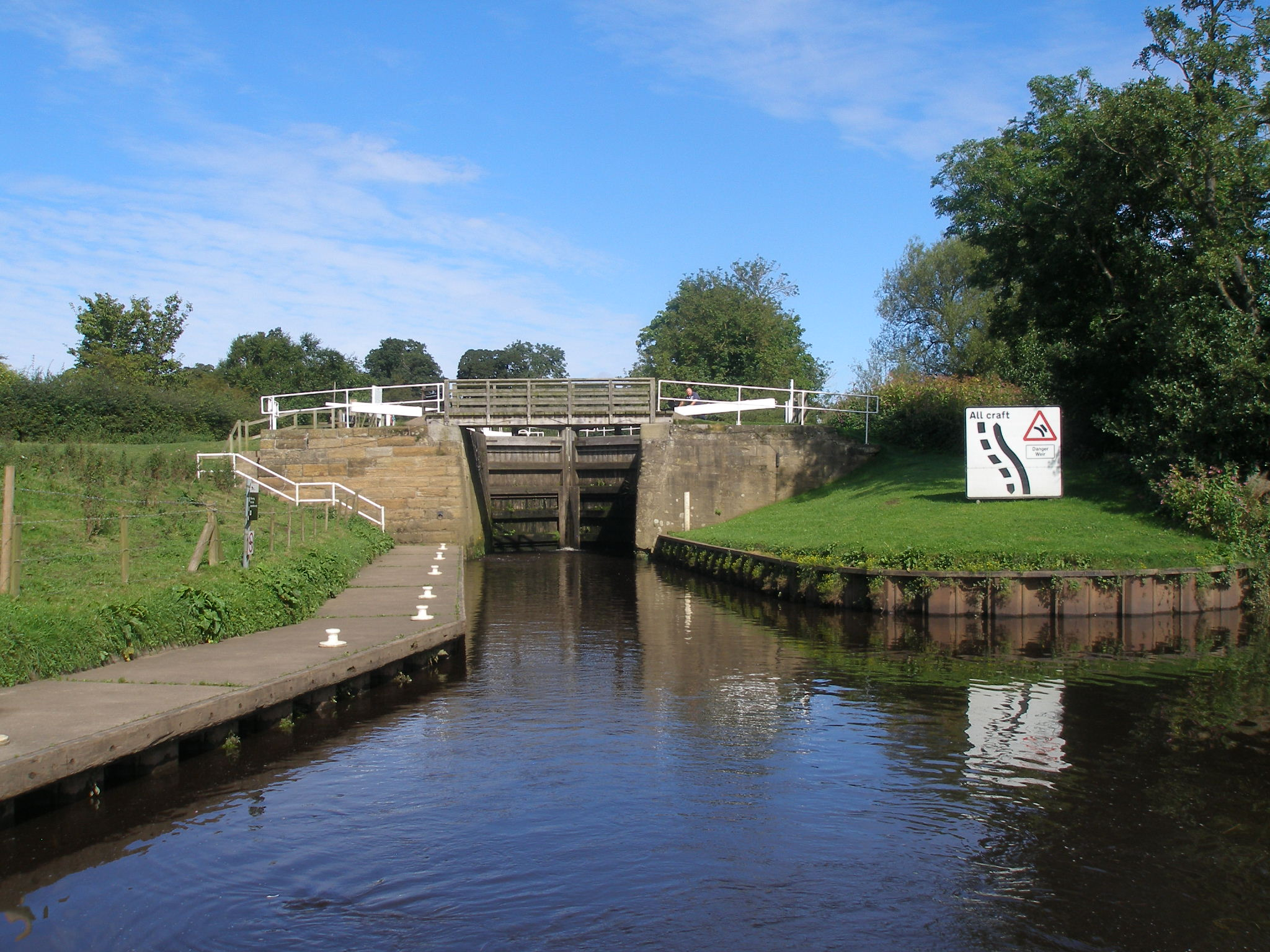
Westwick Lock

Westwick was historically a township in the ancient parish of Ripon in the West Riding of Yorkshire. It became a separate civil parish in 1866. From 1974 to 2023 it was part of the Borough of Harrogate, it is now administered by the unitary North Yorkshire Council.

Westwick Lock, one of two locks on the navigable section of the River Ure, is in the parish.
