= Wensley Bridge =

Bridge in North Yorkshire, England

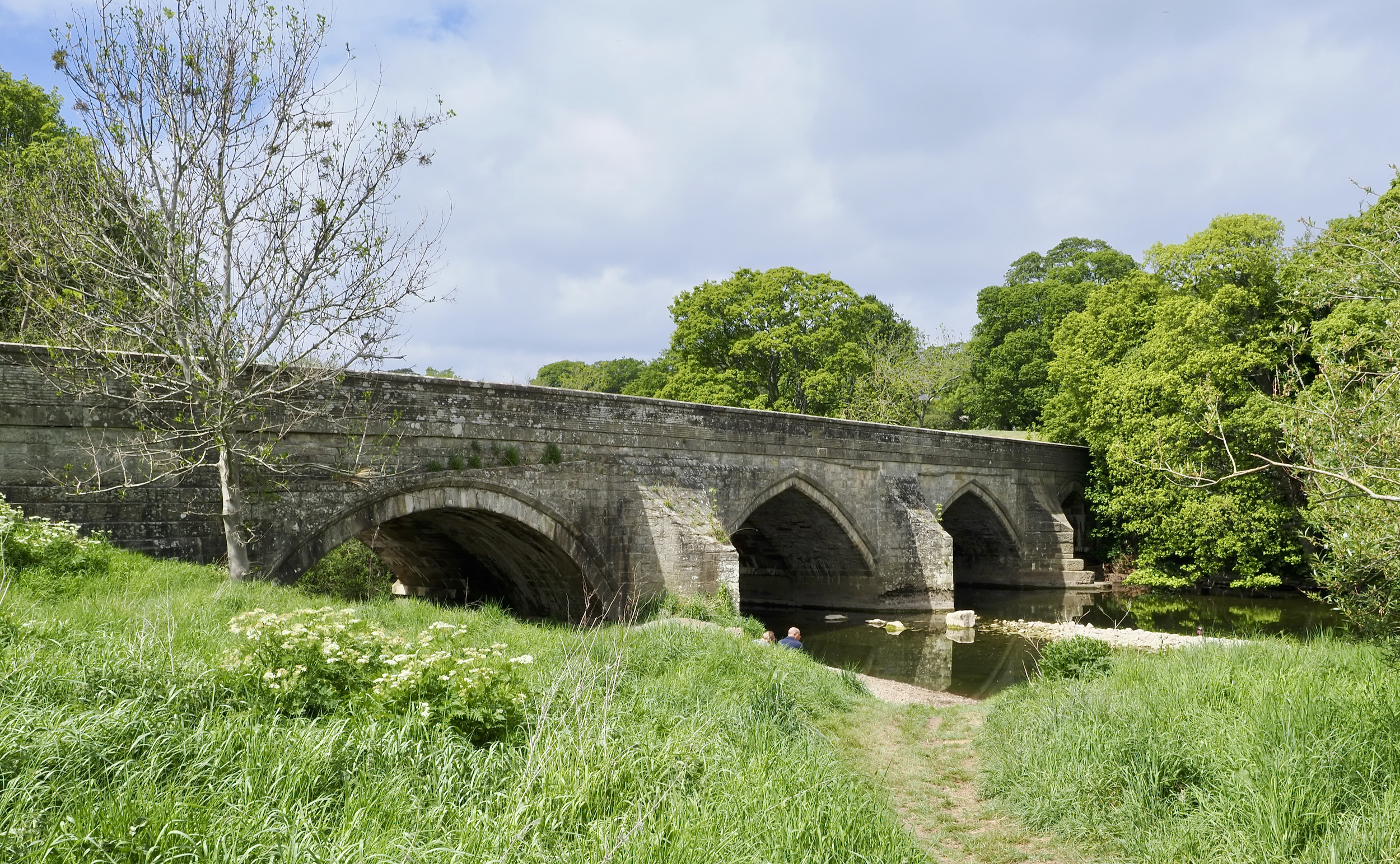
- The bridge in 2025

- Location within North Yorkshire

General information
- Location: A684, Wensley, North Yorkshire, England
- Coordinates: 54.3004°N 1.8613°W
- Year built: 15th century
- Renovated: 18th and 19th century (partly rebuilt)

Listed Building – Grade II
- Official name: Wensley Bridge
- Designated: 13 February 1967
- Reference no.: 1318595

Scheduled monument
- Official name: Wensley Bridge
- Reference no.: 1004915

Wensley Bridge is a historic structure in Wensley, North Yorkshire, a village in England.

In 1400, £40 was left in the will of Richard, Lord Scrope, for the repair of a bridge over the River Ure at Wensley. According to John Leland, the bridge was built in 1436 on the instruction of Alwyne, the rector of Holy Trinity Church. The southern arch was rebuilt in the 18th century, then the bridge was widened upstream and the north arch was rebuilt in 1818. The parapets were rebuilt at some point in the 19th century. The road over the bridge is now designated as the A684. The bridge was Grade II listed in 1967, and is also a scheduled monument.

The bridge is built of stone and has four arches. On the downstream side, the middle two arches are pointed, the southern arch is segmental with voussoirs and a chamfered archivolt, and the north arch is semicircular. The cutwaters are triangular with concave chamfered tops. On the upstream side all the arches are semicircular with voussoirs, plain archivolts and stepped triangular cutwaters. The parapets end in circular bollards with horizontal tooling.

== See also ==
- Listed buildings in Wensley, North Yorkshire

Next bridge upstream	River Ure	Next bridge downstream
Lord's Bridge	Wensley Bridge; Grid reference SE0912689430	Middleham Bridge
