= Ure Viaduct =

Former viaduct in North Yorkshire, England

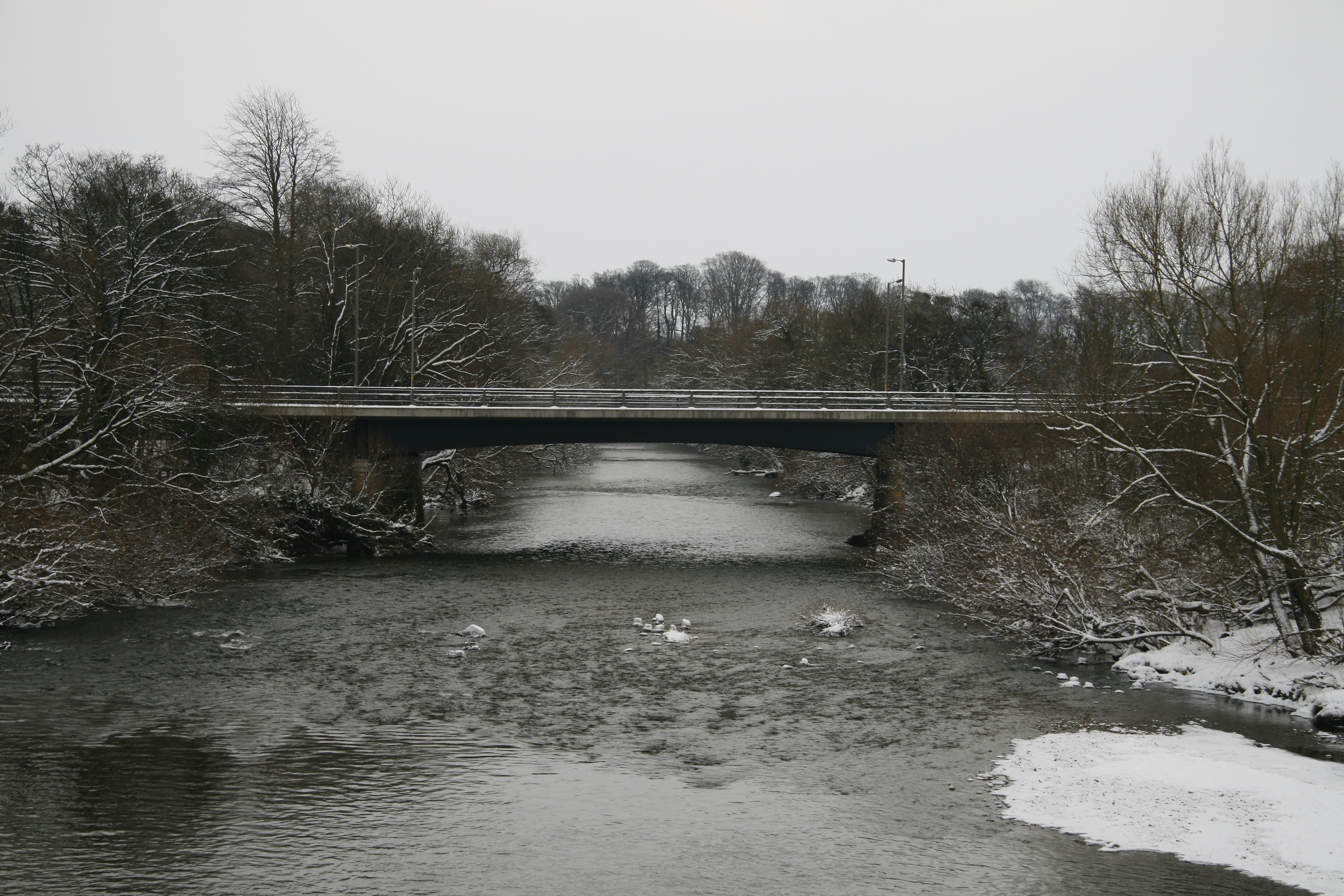
- The railway viaduct was in the foreground
- Coordinates: 54.1433°N 1.5142°W
- OS grid reference: SE318720
- Locale: Ripon, North Yorkshire, England
- Other name: Ripon Viaduct
- NER Number: 80
- Preceded by: North Bridge
- Followed by: Hewick Bridge (Note: A viaduct existed between 1848 and 1972, The A61 bypass bridge, which is now geographically the next bridge to the south, was not built until 1996.)

Characteristics
- Material: Timber (original); Cast iron (second)
- Height: 40 feet (12 m) above river level
- No. of spans: 14

Rail characteristics
- No. of tracks: 2

History
- Opened: September 1848
- Rebuilt: 1869
- Closed: 1969
- Demolished: 1972

Location
- Interactive map of Ure Viaduct

Ure Viaduct (also known as Ripon Viaduct) was a railway bridge that crossed the River Ure to the north-east of the city of Ripon in North Yorkshire, England. The first viaduct on the site was constructed of timber and opened in 1848. This was replaced in 1869 with a cast iron structure which was closed in 1969, and was then demolished in 1972.

== History ==
The line between Harrogate and Ripon was opened in September 1848 as part of the Leeds Northern Railway's route between Leeds and Thirsk, although services from Ripon station northwards to Thirsk Town had started on 31 May 1848 (the railway station at Ripon was north of the river, so these services did not need to wait for the River Ure to be crossed). Work on the viaduct started in March 1847, and the geological problems south of the river hindered construction; the land had proved unstable, and so further work was necessary before full opening southwards could be achieved. The viaduct straddled the River Ure in the city with 14 spans, each 50-foot (15 m) across, with the viaduct being about 40 feet (12 m) above the river.

In the late 1860s, Ripon City Council complained that the original Leeds Northern Railway timber viaduct over the River Ure was unsafe, and even though the North Eastern Railway (the successors to the Leeds Northern Railway) assured them it was safe, it was replaced by a cast iron one in 1869. Traffic continued to use this bridge until its closure in 1969. The newer viaduct had a cast iron deck and some metal piers, and some piers were made of stone. The viaduct was on a slight incline from south to north into the station of 1-in-262. The railway south of Ripon station also crossed a local road to Sharow, and the road between Ripon and Thirsk. It crossed these on a bridge which then connected with the viaduct, however, the two structures were classified as separate by the NER.

In 1947, an LNER newspaper special train derailed on the viaduct, damaging the track between the viaduct and Ripon station. However, the train re-righted itself, so that by the time the train had stopped at the station, all the wagons were back on the track. However, the rails on the viaduct were torn up, and one-line working was instigated until repairs could be made.

Passenger traffic across the viaduct ceased in 1967, though freight to Ripon from Starbeck continued for two more years, and then after final closure in 1969, the iron deck part of the viaduct was demolished in 1972. The stone pillars remained, but they were removed sporadically from the 1980s onwards. The viaduct has been known as either Ure Viaduct, or Ripon Viaduct; Tomlinson calls it by both names. Calls have been made to reopen the railway between Harrogate, Ripon and Northallerton; but this would require the railway bridge to be rebuilt. A report from 1988 (before the bypass road opened) states that re-instating the viaduct would cost £1.4 million (equivalent to £4,742,000 in 2023). (Note: One of the options for a re-opened railway was that the line only extended southwards from Thirsk, or northwards from Harrogate, and Ripon station would be a terminus. The re-siting of the station means that a crossing of the river may not be needed.) Much of the trackbed just to the south of the viaduct, has been taken up by the A61 bypass road, which opened in March 1996.

== See also ==
- Kirkstall Viaduct
- Crimple Viaduct
- Nidd Viaduct
- Yarm Viaduct

All of these are other viaducts on the same original Leeds Northern Railway route.
