= Tanfield Bridge =

Bridge in North Yorkshire, England

Coordinates: 54.2036°N 1.5880°W

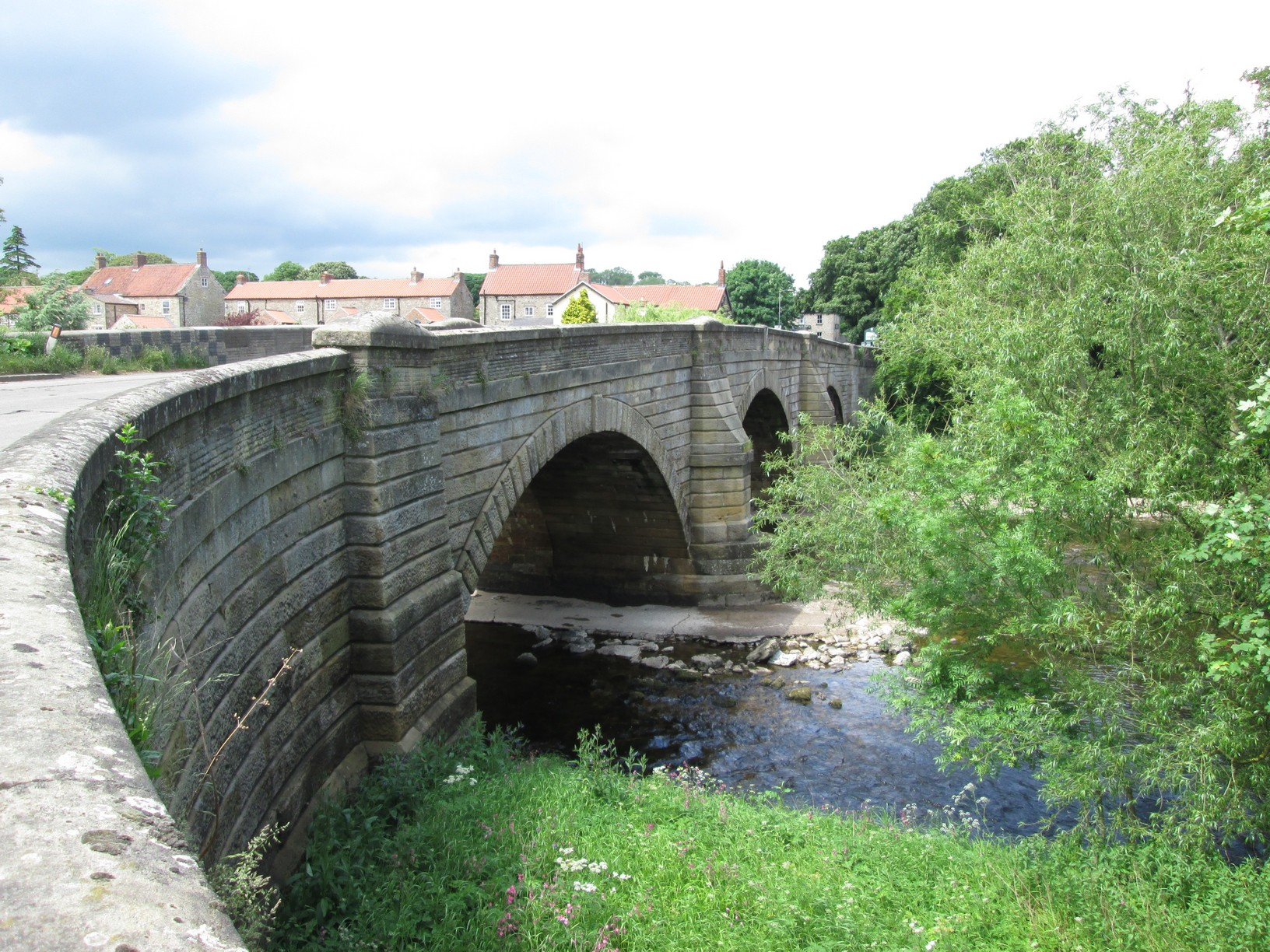
The bridge, in 2013

Tanfield Bridge is a historic bridge connecting West Tanfield and North Stainley in North Yorkshire, in England.

There may have been a bridge over the River Ure at the site in the Mediaeval period, but if so it had collapsed by the time of John Leland's visit. A stone bridge was constructed in 1609, but was washed away in a flood in 1733. It was rebuilt by Robert Dee and was nearly finished when another flood badly damaged it. It was eventually completed in 1738, and was extended to the east in the late 18th century, its width being doubled. The road over the bridge is now the A6108. The bridge was grade II listed in 1989 and is also a scheduled monument. English Heritage examined the bridge in 2002 and recommended that its scheduling was removed and it was upgraded to a grade II* listing, but this was not implemented.

The bridge is built of stone, rusticated and with a band on the east side, and consists of three segmental arches with voussoirs and hood moulds. There are triangular cutwaters rising to pilasters, a parapet with flat copings, and round end piers with semi-spherical caps. In the centre of the parapet is the inscription "Division of North and West Riding".

== See also ==
- Listed buildings in North Stainley with Sleningford
- Listed buildings in West Tanfield
- List of crossings of the River Ure
