= Danby Hall =

Building in North Yorkshire, England

Coordinates: 54.2798°N 1.7576°W

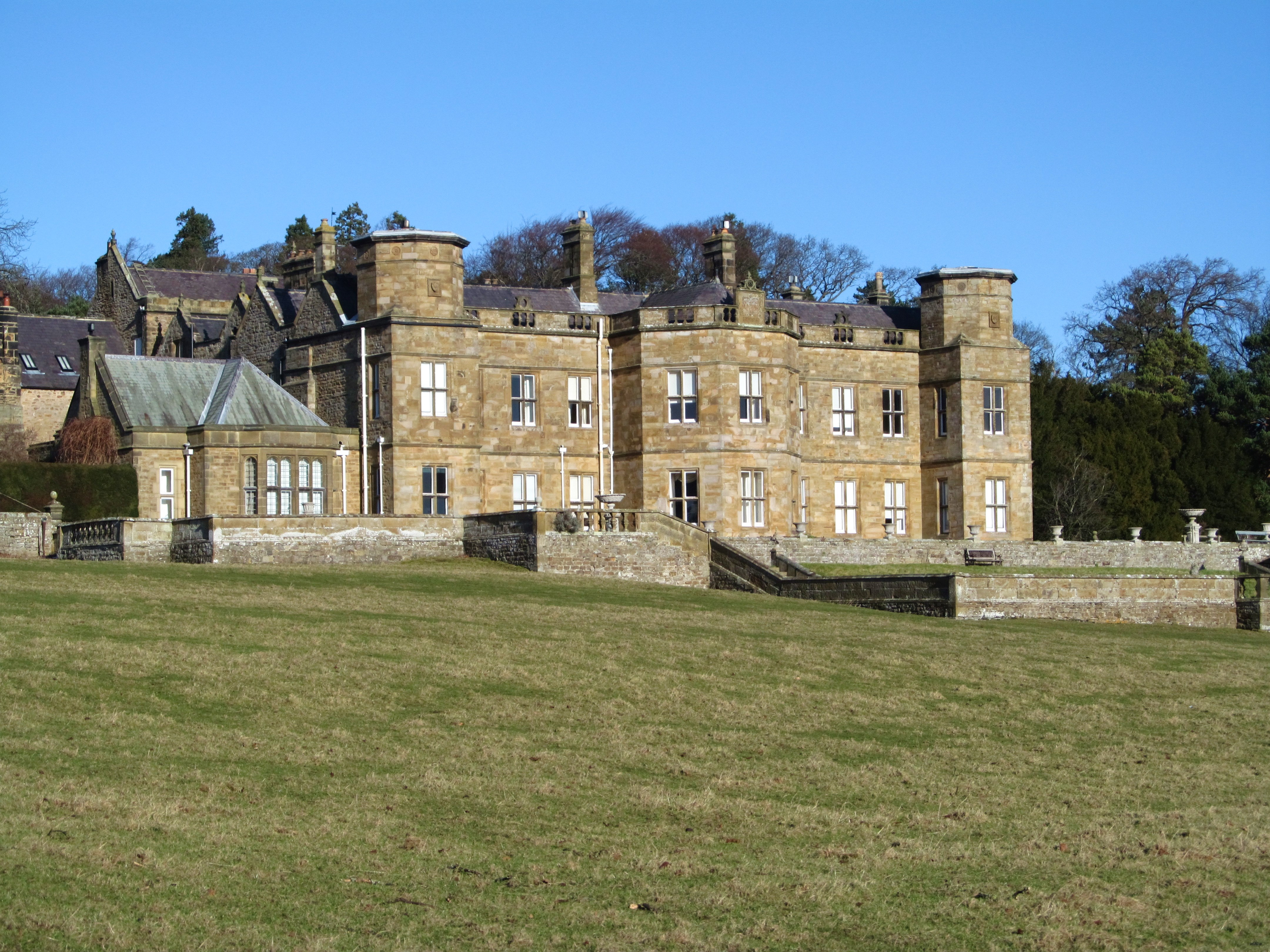
The building, in 2015

Danby Hall is a historic building near Thornton Steward, a village in North Yorkshire, in England.

The country house was originally constructed in the 14th century as a pele tower, perhaps with a wing attached. The house passed to the Scrope family, who greatly enlarged the building in 1658. The building was greatly altered by Joseph Hansom in 1855, the work including a new garden front. Local tradition claims that the building was reduced from three storeys to two, although its development is not entirely clear. While the work was underway, a secret room was discovered with a cache of weapons, supposedly concealed in support of Bonnie Prince Charlie during the Jacobite rising of 1745. The building was grade I listed in 1967.

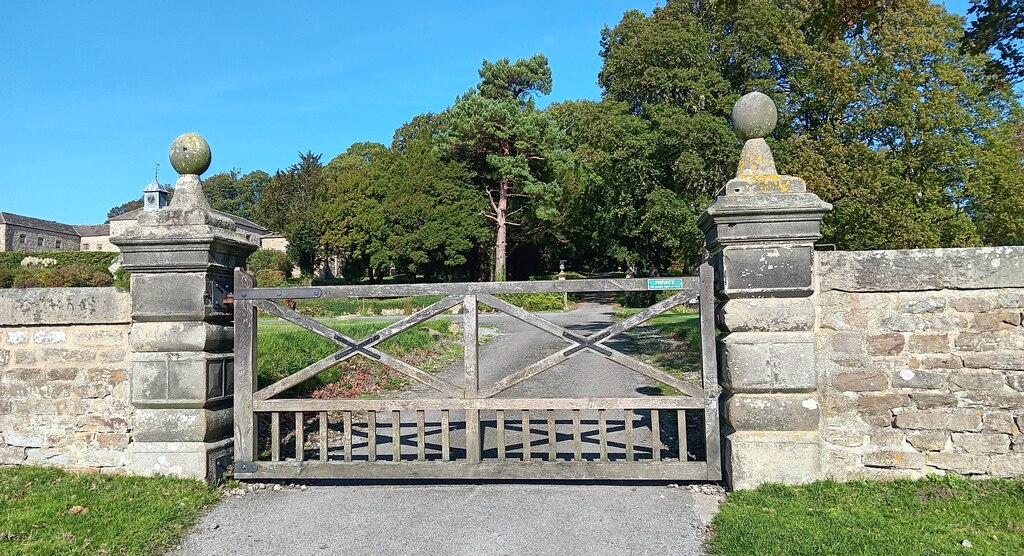
Gates to the hall

The house is built of stone and has a Welsh slate roof with coped gables and finials. It has two storeys and an H-shaped plan. The entrance front has a range of five bays, the second and fourth bays projecting, and long flanking cross wings, above which is a pierced and balustraded parapet, at one point with pierced initials and a date, and the windows are cross windows. On the right wing is a 14th-century pele tower with mullioned windows and an embattled parapet. The garden front has eleven bays, and in the centre is a five-sided two-storey canted bay window. The end bays are square and are surmounted by octagonal turrets. Inside, there is a 17th-century staircase, and the drawing room has panelling and plasterwork of a similar date.

The stable block was built in the early 18th century and is grade II listed. It is built of stone, with quoins, and hipped stone slate roofs. It forms three ranges round a courtyard and has two storeys. The main range has seven bays, the middle three bays taller and projecting. In the centre is a coach arch, partly infilled, and containing a doorway with a Baroque surround, a pulvinated frieze and an ogee scroll pediment. Above it is an oculus in a moulded surround containing an inscribed sundial. On the roof is a cupola with a clock, a lead ogee roof and a weathervane. Elsewhere, there are sash windows, stable doors and other doorways, and coach and carriage openings. Adjoining the left wing are stone gate piers, each with a cornice and a ball finial.

== See also ==
- Grade I listed buildings in North Yorkshire (district)
- Listed buildings in Thornton Steward
