= Thornton Steward =

Village and civil parish in North Yorkshire, England

Coordinates: 54°16′45″N 1°43′45″W

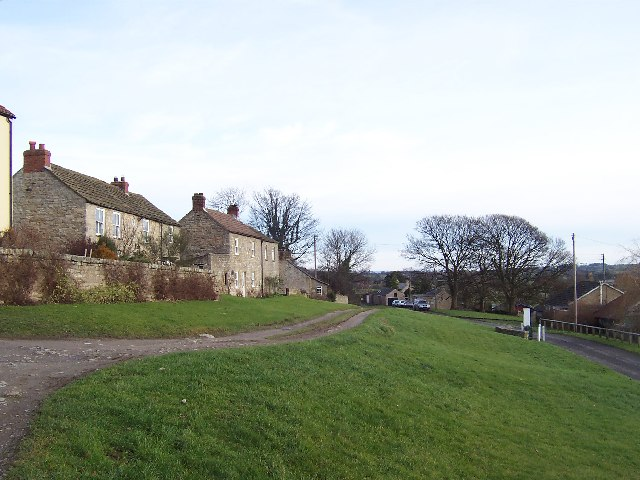
- Thornton Steward

- Location within North Yorkshire
- Population: 199 (2011 census)
- OS grid reference: SE178872
- Unitary authority: North Yorkshire
- Ceremonial county: North Yorkshire
- Region: Yorkshire and the Humber
- Country: England
- Sovereign state: United Kingdom
- Post town: RIPON
- Postcode district: HG4
- Police: North Yorkshire
- Fire: North Yorkshire
- Ambulance: Yorkshire

Thornton Steward is a small village and civil parish in North Yorkshire, England, near Wensleydale, with a population of 100–200, measured at 199 in the 2011 Census. The name derives from Old English relating to a hawthorn tree on a farm (or settlement) and Steward. The village was formerly owned by Wymar, who was the steward of the Earls of Richmond. The village is very similar to the others that dot Wensleydale, but Thornton Steward has a reservoir owned by Yorkshire Water.

From 1974 to 2023 it was part of the district of Richmondshire. It is now administered by the unitary North Yorkshire Council.

The village includes the ancient St Oswald's Church, which is reputedly the oldest church in Wensleydale, with some parts being dated back to the year 680. The church was subject to Channel 4's show Time Team, where they found remains of a community of monks. The village was also featured in the British television series All Creatures Great and Small, in the episode "If Wishes Were Horses".

The hill, East Witton fell, is visible from Thornton Steward and on the western side Jervaulx Abbey is visible.

The school house was founded in 1815 by George Horn, with a budget of '£10 per annum', but was closed during the 20th century. It is situated in between the towns of Leyburn and Bedale, and is near to several tourist attractions such as Thorp Perrow Arboretum and the Green Howards regimental exhibition.

== See also ==
- Listed buildings in Thornton Steward
