= River Ure =

River in North Yorkshire, England

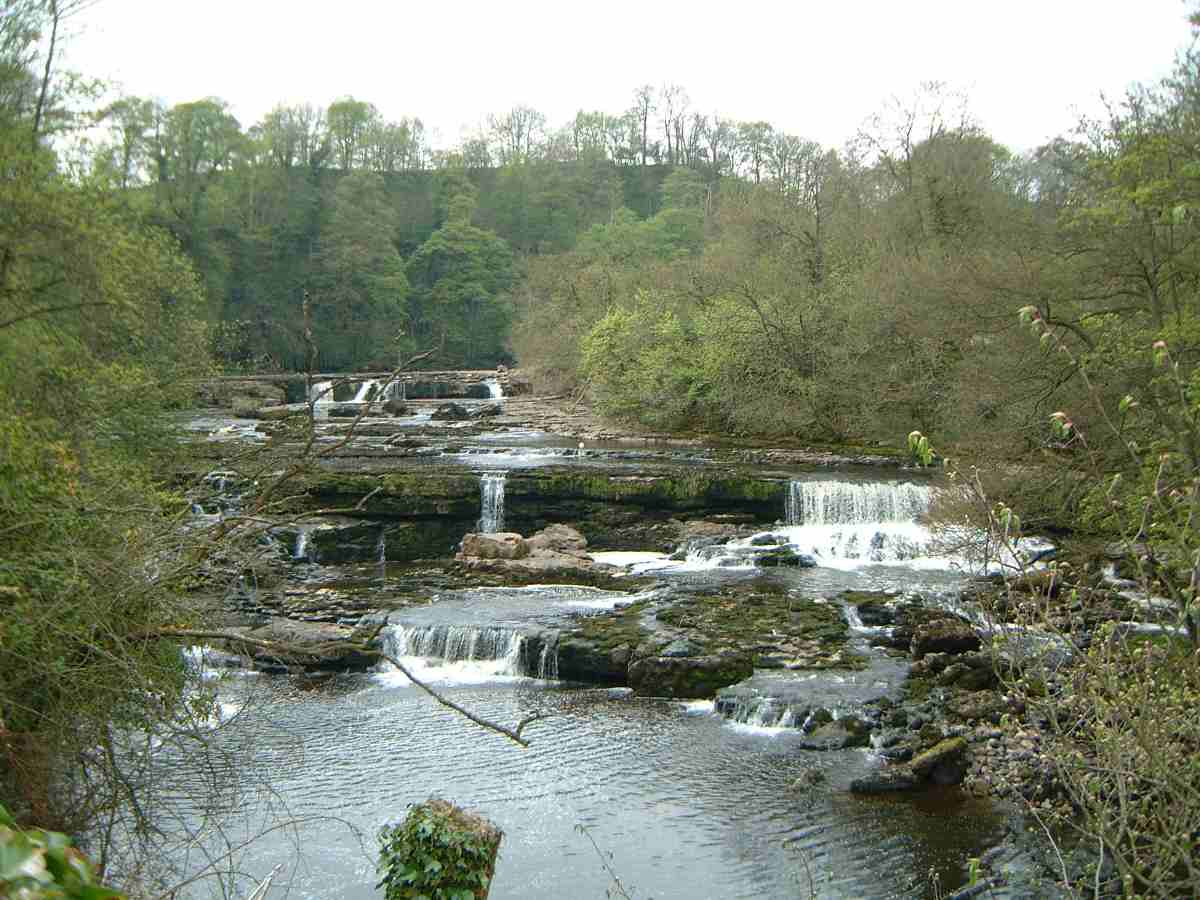
- Aysgarth Falls in Wensleydale

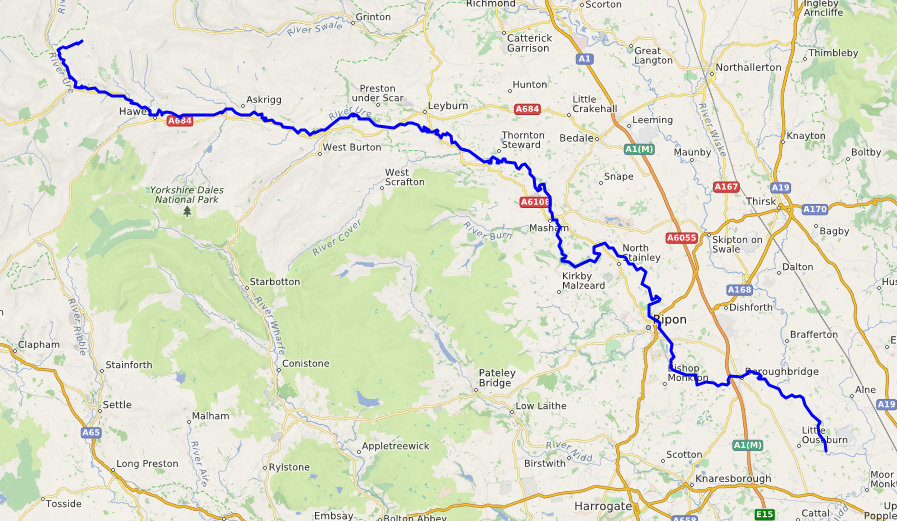
- Location of the Ure within North Yorkshire

Location
- Country: England
- State: North Yorkshire

Physical characteristics
- Source: Ure Head
  - coordinates: 54°21′59.967″N 2°18′0.033″W
  - elevation: 640 m (2,100 ft)
- Mouth: River Ouse
  - location: Cuddy Shaw Reach (near Linton-on-Ouse), North Yorkshire, England
  - coordinates: 54°2′4″N 1°16′30″W
  - elevation: 10 m (33 ft)
- Length: 119 km (74 mi)

The River Ure in North Yorkshire, England, is about 74 miles (119 km) long from its source to the point where it becomes the River Ouse. It is the principal river of Wensleydale, which is the only major dale now named after a village rather than its river. The old name for the valley was Yoredale after the river that runs through it.

The Ure is one of many rivers and waterways that drain the Dales into the River Ouse. Tributaries of the Ure include the River Swale and the River Skell.

== Name ==
The earliest recorded name of the river is Earp in about 1025, probably an error for Ear ƿ, where ƿ represents the Old English letter wynn or 'w', standing for ƿæter ("water"). By 1140 it is recorded as Jor, hence Jervaulx (Jorvale) Abbey, and a little later as Yore. In Tudor times, antiquarians John Leland and William Camden used the modern form of the name.

The name probably means "the strong or swift river". This is on the assumption that the Brittonic name of the river was Isurā, because the Roman name for Aldborough was Isurium; intervocalic s is known to have been lost in Brittonic at an early date. This explanation connects the river name with an Indo-European root is- meaning "strong" and the names of the Isar in Germany and the Isère in France.

== Course ==
The source of the river is Ure Head on Abbotside Common, where it flows west-southwest to the valley floor and then turns south. Where it reaches the A684, it turns east along Wensleydale as far as Wensley. From here, it flows south-east to Jervaulx Abbey and shortly after south to Mickley. Here, it returns east and then south to Ripon. A little way after Ripon, it flows east again to Boroughbridge.

To the east of Boroughbridge, the Ure is joined by the River Swale. About 6 miles (9.7 km) downstream of this confluence, at Cuddy Shaw Reach near Linton-on-Ouse, the river name changes to the River Ouse.

=== Water levels ===
Monitoring station	Station elevation	Low water level	High water level	Record high level
Bainbridge	208 m (682 ft)	0.06 m (0.20 ft)	2.5 m (8.2 ft)	3.66 m (12.0 ft)
Kilgram Bridge	94 m (308 ft)	0.27 m (0.89 ft)	1.5 m (4.9 ft)	5.64 m (18.5 ft)
Masham	76 m (249 ft)	0.14 m (0.46 ft)	2.3 m (7.5 ft)	3.53 m (11.6 ft)
Ripon Ure Bank	24 m (79 ft)	0.03 m (0.098 ft)	0.89 m (2.9 ft)	3.73 m (12.2 ft)
Westwick Lock	22 m (72 ft)	0.11 m (0.36 ft)	2.5 m (8.2 ft)	3.35 m (11.0 ft)
Boroughbridge	15 m (49 ft)	9.62 m (31.6 ft)	13 m (43 ft)	15.59 m (51.1 ft)

- Low and high water levels are average figures.

== Geology ==
Upper Wensleydale is a high, open, and remote, U-shaped valley overlying Yoredale Beds. The gradient is gentle to the north end of the valley, becoming steeper further south. Glacial drumlins lie either side of the river, which is shallow but fast flowing. The river is fed from many gills cutting through woodland and predominantly sheep farmsteads. The Settle to Carlisle railway runs along the western side of the valley here.

Mid Wensleydale is made of Great Scar limestone under Yoredale beds that make up the valley sides, which are marked with stepped limestone scars. The valley floor is made from glacial drift tails and moraine. The river here is broad and gently flowing in meanders in a stony channel. The four tributary valleys contribute to several waterfalls in this area.

Lower Wensleydale is a broader version of mid Wensleydale with the river gently meandering until it drops significantly at Aysgarth over the platformed waterfalls. The valley sides become increasingly wooded.

From Middleham onwards, the river is a typical middle-aged river and meanders in wider arcs as it flows south-east.

== History ==
The valley has been inhabited since prehistoric times. Examples of earthworks and other artifacts from the Bronze and Iron Ages can be seen in the Dales Countryside Museum in Hawes, and the Romans built a fort at Bainbridge. Place names in the valley denote the different types of settlers, such as Angles and Norse with typical suffixes such as "ton" and "sett".

During medieval times, much of the upper dale was sheep country belonging to Middleham Castle and Jervaulx Abbey. In 1751, the Richmond to Lancaster Turnpike was created and followed the Roman road from Bainbridge. In 1795, it was diverted along the valley to Hawes and took the Widdale route, now the B6255 to Ingleton.

In 1990, Aysgarth Falls was used as a location in Robin Hood, Prince of Thieves, in the scene where Robin Hood fights Little John. The falls also featured in the 1992 film of Wuthering Heights and the 1984 TV miniseries, A Woman of Substance.

== Economy ==
Farming (including dairying), tourism, and quarrying are the mainstays of the modern economy of the valley. The dairy at Hawes produces Wensleydale cheese. Brewing takes place in Masham at the Black Sheep and Theakston Breweries.

Many waymarked footpaths and open countryside are seen. The Pennine Way passes through Hawes.

== Navigation ==
The River Ure is navigable upstream as far as its junction with the Ripon Canal, 2 miles (3 km) south-east of Ripon, a distance of 13.6 miles (21.9 km). Locks were constructed at Milby, where a short-cut bypasses the weir at Boroughbridge, and at Westwick.

Navigation to Swale Nab, at the confluence with the River Swale, was opened in January 1769 as part of the River Ouse Navigation. Navigation to the Ripon Canal was opened in January 1772.

The Leeds and Thirsk Railway bought the navigation in January 1846. The navigation was neglected, and the lack of dredging resulted in boats having to be loaded with less cargo. A brief upturn in trade occurred in the 1860s, but the decline continued. By 1892, no traffic proceeded past Boroughbridge, and the North Eastern Railway took action to prevent the waterway above Boroughbridge from being used.

Until 1999, the navigation authority to Swale Nab was the Linton Lock Navigation Commissioners. The commissioners had insufficient income to maintain the navigation, and in 1999, it was transferred to British Waterways. The navigation authority for the whole navigation is now the Canal & River Trust.

== Natural history ==
The differing habitats of the area have their own populations of flora such as cranesbill, bistort, pignut, and buttercup. Other species that can be seen in the area are wood anemones, violets, primroses, purple orchids, cowslips, and herb paris. Some plants, such as spring sandwort, have managed to grow where lead mining took place. Large populations of badgers, roe deer, red foxes and rabbits occur in the valley. Among the variety of birds that can be seen in the valley are golden plovers, curlews, and oystercatchers. Fish populations along the river include brown trout, grayling, barbel, chub, roach, and perch.

== Gallery ==
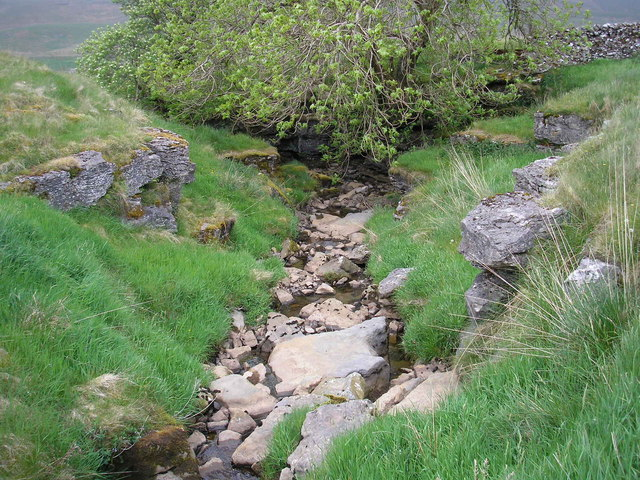
The River Ure near its source

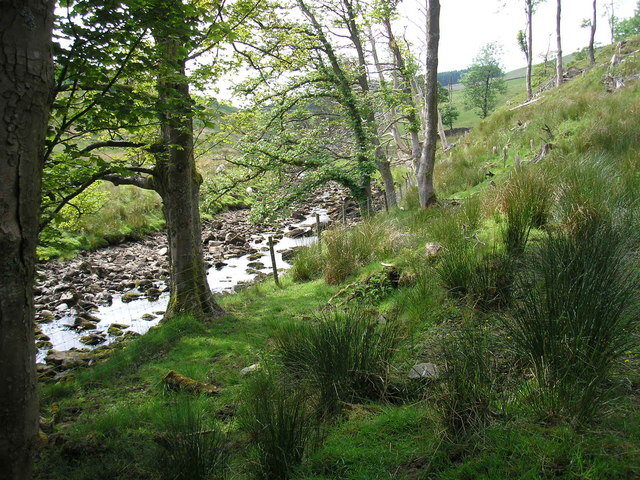
River Ure west of Hawes

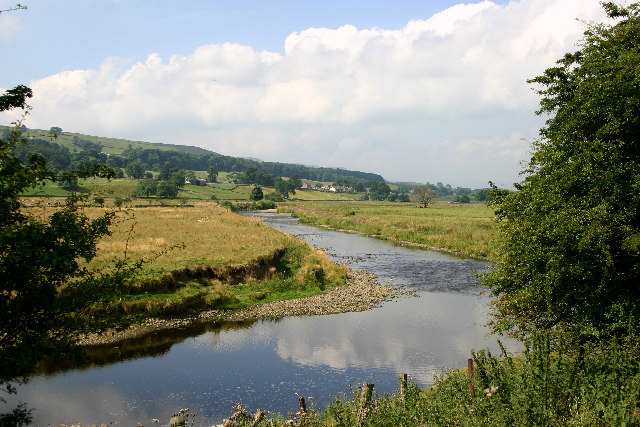
The River Ure near Worton Bridge

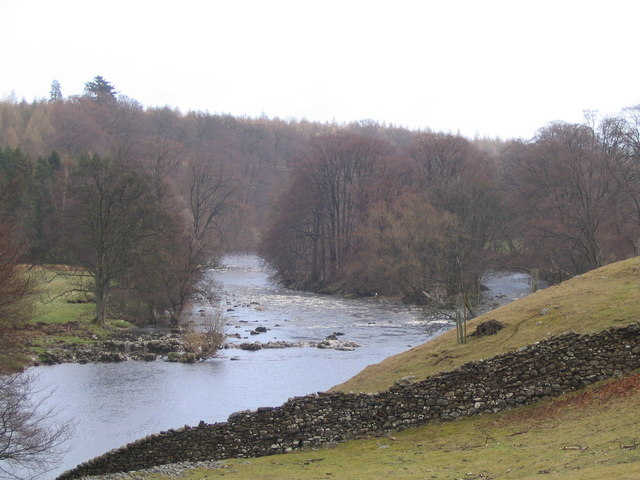
River Ure near Aysgarth with Batt Island in view

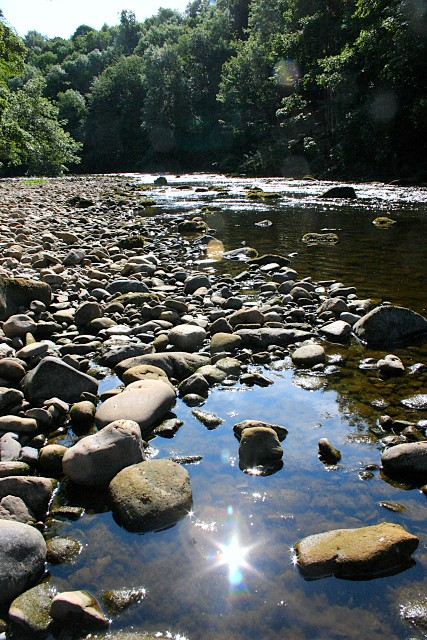
The River Ure at Hackfall Gorge near Mickley

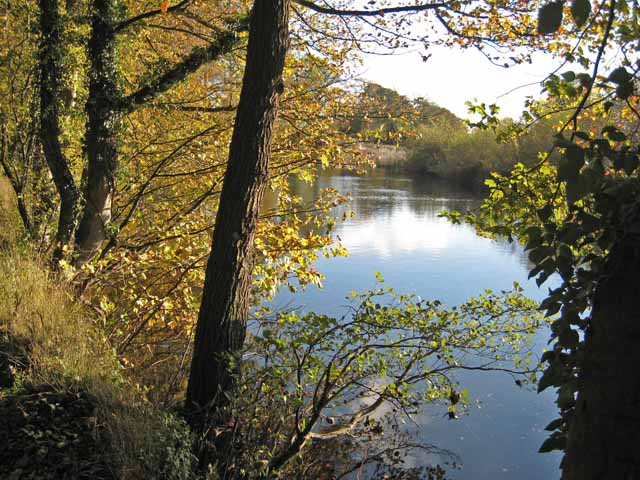
River Ure near West Tanfield

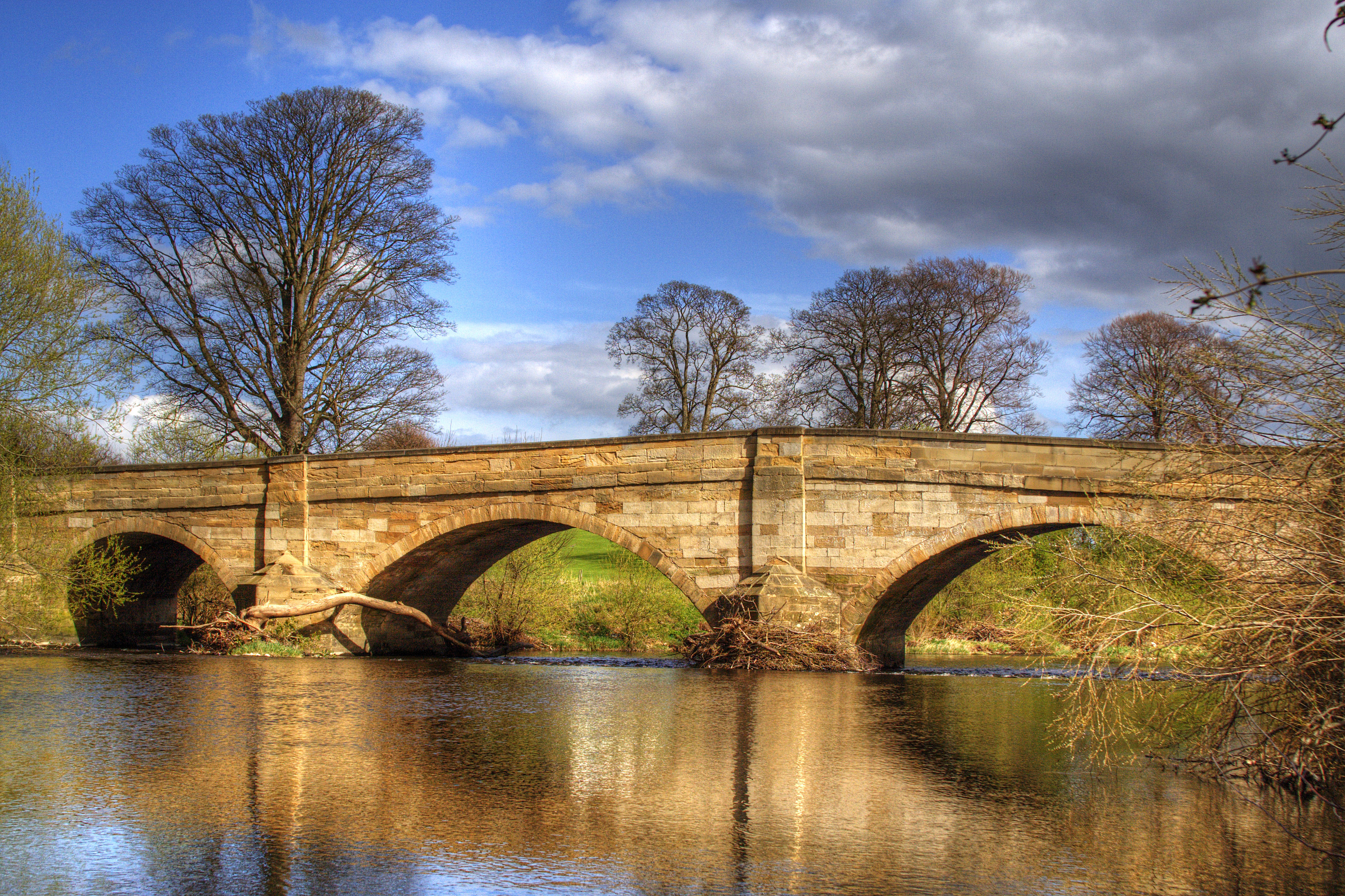
Bridge over River Ure near Ripon

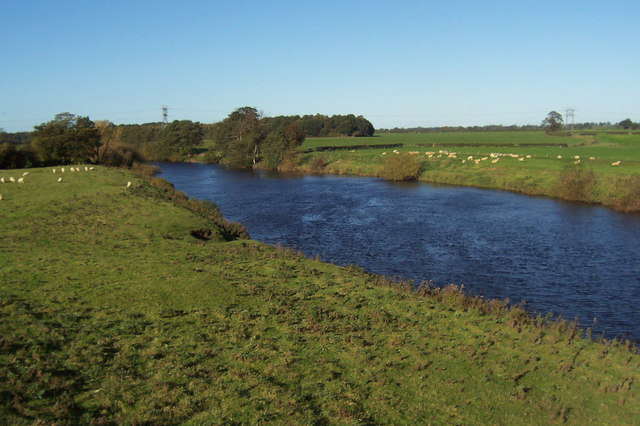
River Ure, Roecliffe

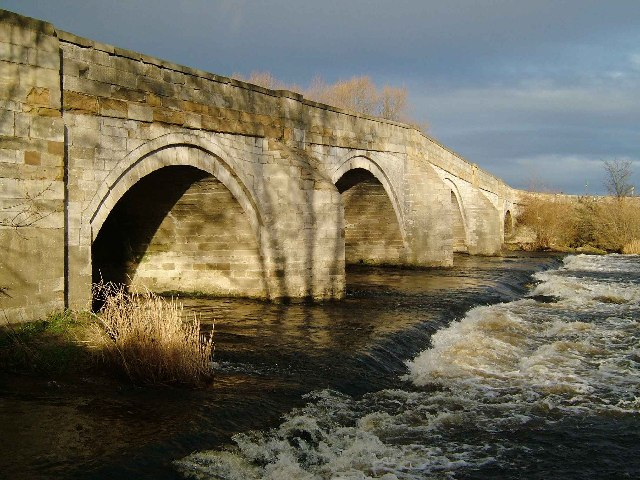
B6265 Hewick Bridge over River Ure

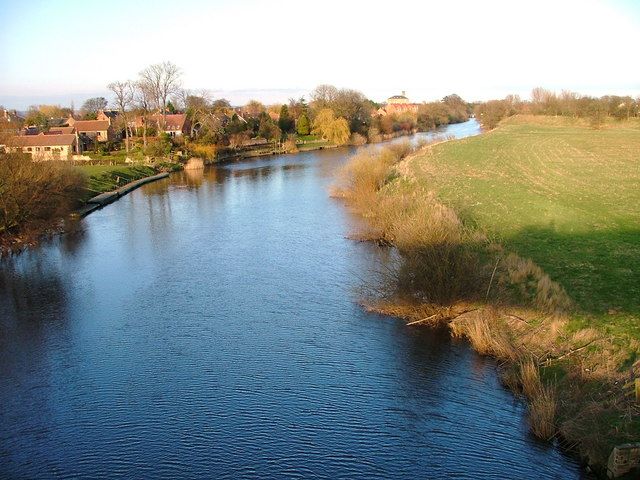
River Ure taken from Arrows Bridge

== Lists ==
=== Tributaries ===
From the source of the river:

- Tongue Gill
- Grass Gill
- Scars Gill
- Keld Gill
- Johnston Gill
- South Lunds Sike
- Tarn gill
- Scothole Gill
- Carr Gill
- Mossdale Beck
- Cottersdale Beck
- Widdale Beck
- Hardraw Beck
- Thorne Sike
- Gayle Beck
- Blackburn Sike
- Eller Beck
- Nicholl Gill
- Raygill Sike
- Grays Beck
- River Bain
- Paddock Beck
- West Mawks Sike
- Newbiggin Beck
- Craike Sike Gutter
- Sister Ings Beck
- Starra Beck
- Wanley Beck
- Gill Beck
- Eller Beck
- Low Beck
- Bishopdale/Walden Becks
- Kendall Beck
- Belden Beck/Swan River
- Mill Beck
- Wensley Beck
- Mill Beck
- Harmby/Spennithorne Becks
- River Cover
- Harker Beck
- River Burn
- Black Robin Beck
- River Skell
- River Tutt
- River Swale

=== Settlements ===
From the source of the river:

- Lunds
- Appersett
- Hawes
- Bainbridge
- Worton
- Woodhall
- Aysgarth
- Wensley
- Spennithorne
- Middleham
- Ulshaw
- Masham
- Mickley
- West Tanfield
- North Stainley
- Nunwick
- Hutton Conyers
- Ure Bank
- Ripon
- Roecliffe
- Boroughbridge
- Lower Dunsforth
- Aldwark

=== Crossings ===
From the source of the river:

- Green Bridge (foot)
- How Beck Bridge
- Footbridge
- Blades Footbridge
- Unnamed road
- Unnamed road
- Thwaite Bridge
- A684
- Footbridge
- A684 New Bridge
- Footbridge
- Haylands Beck, Hawes
- Footbridge
- Yore Bridge, Bainbridge
- Worton Bridge, Worton
- Footbridge
- Footbridge
- Footbridge
- Yore Bridge
- A684 Wensley Bridge
- A684 Middleham Bridge
- Ulshaw Bridge
- Footbridge
- A6108 Masham Bridge
- Footbridge
- A6108 Tanfield Bridge
- North Bridge, Ripon
- A61 Ripon By-pass
- B6265 Bridge Hewick
- A1(M)
- A168 Arrows Bridge
- Borough Bridge
- Footbridge
- Aldwark Bridge (Toll)
