= Baron Bolton =

Barony in the Peerage of Great Britain

Barony of Bolton
- Sable three Sword in pile points downwards Argent pommelled and hilted Or on a Canton Argent an Escutcheon Sable charged with a Salmon hauriant proper.
- Creation date: 20 October 1797
- Created by: King George III
- Peerage: Peerage of Great Britain
- First holder: Thomas Orde-Powlett, 1st Baron Bolton
- Present holder: Thomas Peter Algar Orde-Powlett, 9th Baron Bolton
- Heir apparent: Hector Percy Algar Orde-Powlett
- Seat: Bolton Hall

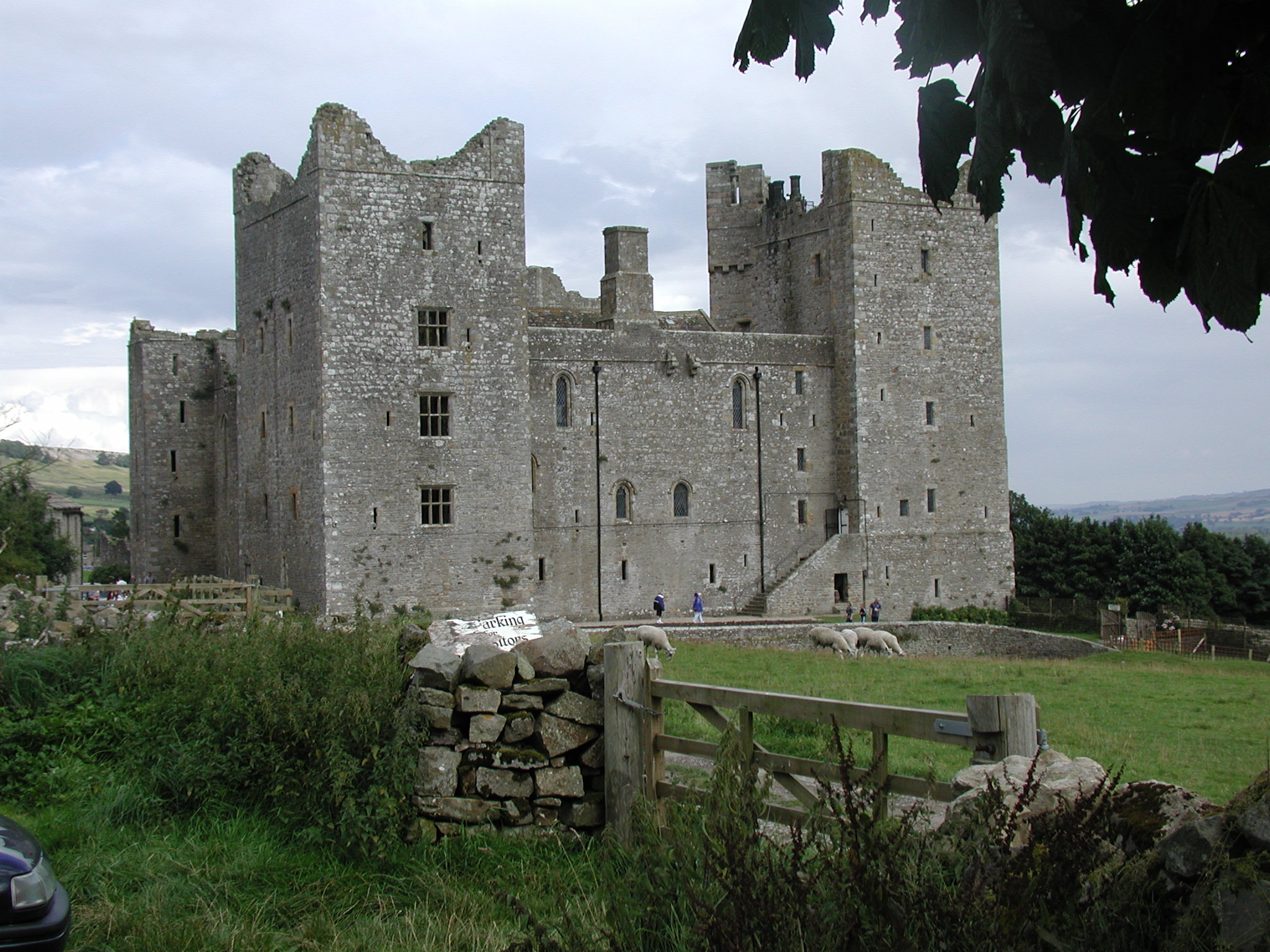
Bolton Castle, North Yorkshire

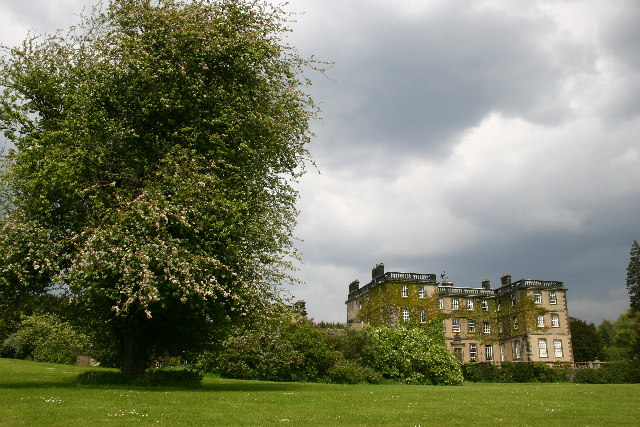
Bolton Hall, North Yorkshire

Baron Bolton, of Bolton Castle in the County of York, is a title in the Peerage of Great Britain. It was created in 1797 for the Tory politician Thomas Orde-Powlett, who had previously served as Chief Secretary for Ireland. Born Thomas Orde, he was the husband of Jean Mary Browne-Powlett, illegitimate daughter of Charles Powlett, 5th Duke of Bolton, who had entailed the greater part of his extensive estates to her in default of male issue of his younger brother Harry Powlett, 6th Duke of Bolton.

John Orde, younger brother of the first Baron Bolton, was an Admiral in the Royal Navy and was created a baronet, of Morpeth in the County of Northumberland, in 1790.

The sixth Duke died without male heirs in 1794 when the dukedom became extinct and the Bolton estates passed to Thomas Orde in right of his wife. In 1795 he assumed the additional surname of Powlett. He was succeeded by his eldest son, the second Baron. He briefly represented Yarmouth in the House of Commons. On his death the title passed to his nephew, the third Baron. His grandson, the fifth Baron, sat as a Conservative Member of Parliament for Richmond and served as Lord Lieutenant of the North Riding of Yorkshire.

The eighth Baron was an amateur jockey and pilot, who led aid convoys providing humanitarian relief to Bosnian Muslims during the Bosnian War. He later became custodian of Bolton Castle, successfully raising funds for its restoration.

As of 2023, the title is held by the latter's son, Thomas Peter Algar [Orde-Powlett], 9th Baron Bolton, who succeeded his father in June 2023.

== Barons Bolton (1797) ==
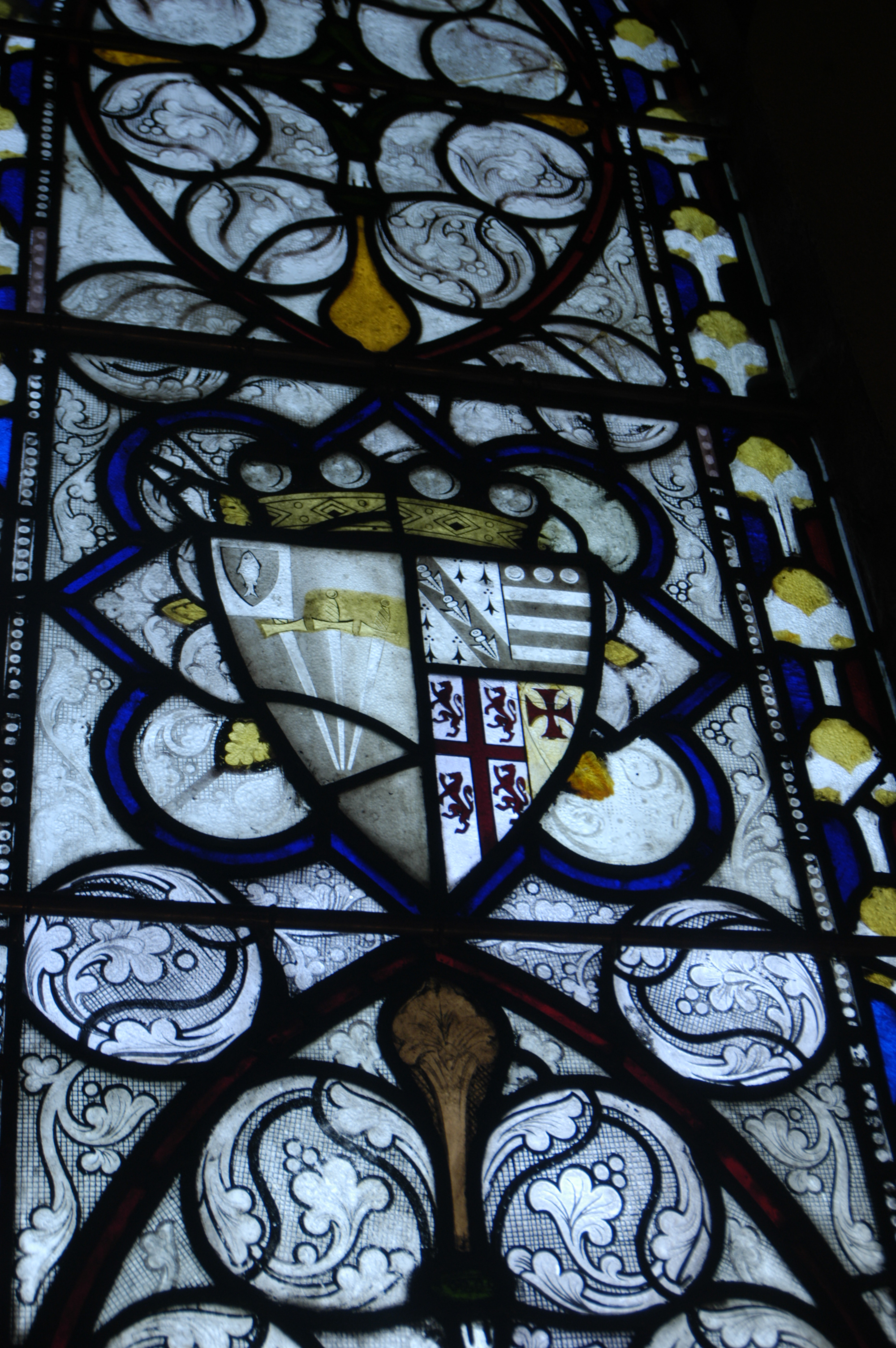
Kingsclere, 1848 shield, Orde-Powlett impaling Carleton for William Orde-Powlett, 2nd Baron Bolton (1782–1850) and his wife (married 1810) Maria Carleton (1777-1863), daughter of Guy Carleton, 1st Baron Dorchester.

William Thomas Orde-Powlett, 4th Baron Bolton (1845-1922), ready for a coronation, 7 August 1902, by Lafayette Ltd., 179 New Bond Street, London.

- Thomas Orde-Powlett, 1st Baron Bolton (1746–1807)
- William Orde-Powlett, 2nd Baron Bolton (1782–1850)
- William Henry Orde-Powlett, 3rd Baron Bolton (1818–1895)
- William Thomas Orde-Powlett, 4th Baron Bolton (1845–1922)
- William George Algar Orde-Powlett, 5th Baron Bolton (1869–1944)
- Nigel Amyas Orde-Powlett, 6th Baron Bolton (1900–1963)
- Richard William Algar Orde-Powlett, 7th Baron Bolton (1929–2001)
- Harry Algar Nigel Orde-Powlett, 8th Baron Bolton (1954–2023)
- Thomas Peter Algar Orde-Powlett MC, 9th Baron Bolton (b. 1979)

The heir apparent is the present holder's son, Hon. Hector Percy Algar Orde-Powlett (b. 2009).

== See also ==
Barons Scrope of Bolton (1371)

- Richard Scrope, 1st Baron Scrope of Bolton (c. 1327–1403)
- Roger Scrope, 2nd Baron Scrope of Bolton (d. 1403)
- Richard Scrope, 3rd Baron Scrope of Bolton (1393–1420)
- Henry Scrope, 4th Baron Scrope of Bolton (1418–1459)
- John Scrope, 5th Baron Scrope of Bolton (1435–1498)
- Henry Scrope, 6th Baron Scrope of Bolton (d. 1506)
- Henry Scrope, 7th Baron Scrope of Bolton (c. 1480–1533)
- John Scrope, 8th Baron Scrope of Bolton (d. 1549)
- Henry Scrope, 9th Baron Scrope of Bolton (c. 1534–1591)
- Thomas Scrope, 10th Baron Scrope of Bolton (c. 1567–1609)
- Emanuel Scrope, 1st Earl of Sunderland, 11th Baron Scrope of Bolton (1584–1630)
  - His daughter Mary (died 1680) married Charles Paulet, sixth Marquess of Winchester and later created first Duke of Bolton (c. 1630 – 1699).

Other titles:

- Duke of Bolton
- Campbell-Orde baronets

== Bolton lands ==
According to John Bateman's The Great Landowners of Great Britain and Ireland, 1883, the 3rd Lord Bolton (1818–1895) of the day, of Hackwood Park, Basingstoke, &tc, and the London clubs Carlton and Boodle's, had in the North Riding of Yorkshire 15,413 acres (62 km^{2}) returning £14,515.20 per year and in Hampshire 13,808 acres (56 km^{2}), returning £14,414.40 (converted from guineas).

The sixth Baron, still as today of Bolton Hall, died in 1963 with free-to-distribute assets probated at £71,979 (equivalent to about £1,300,000 in 2025) and about 1/20 of that amount the next year in a settled land valuation, co-administered by Sir Henry Lawson-Tancred.
