= Henry Scrope (disambiguation) =

Henry Scrope, 3rd Baron Scrope of Masham (c. 1370–1415) was a favourite of King Henry V, beheaded for his involvement in the Southampton Plot.

Henry Scrope may also refer to:

- Henry le Scrope (in or before 1268– 1336), English lawyer
- Henry Scrope, 1st Baron Scrope of Masham (c. 1312–1392), English soldier and administrator
- Henry Scrope, 4th Baron Scrope of Bolton (1418–1459)
- Henry Scrope, 6th Baron Scrope of Bolton (c. 1468–1506)
- Henry Scrope, 7th Baron Scrope of Bolton (c. 1480–1533)
- Henry Scrope, 9th Baron Scrope of Bolton (c. 1534–1592)
- Henry Scrope (died 1625) (c. 1570–1625), MP for Carlisle
