= Scrope =

English noble family

Scrope (pronounced "scroop") is the name of an old English family of Norman origin that first came into prominence in the 14th century. The family has held the noble titles of Baron Scrope of Masham, Baron Scrope of Bolton, and for a brief time, the Earl of Wiltshire.

== Origin of name ==
The name Scrope may be derived from the old Anglo-Norman word for "crab". Whether far-fetched or not, it is fact that at one stage the family crest was a crab (subsequently five feathers) and that the family motto is still Devant si je puis ("forward if I can"), which could have a double meaning as, of course, a crab can only go sideways.

== Herald Dispute ==
The Grosvenors and Scropes briefly both used blue coats of arms with gold diagonal stripes: 'Azure, a bend Or'. The matter was resolved in the Court of Chivalry, which allowed the Scropes to keep their coat of arms and ordered the Grosvenors to change their by adding a wheat-sheaf; this charge can still be seen on the arms of the Dukes of Westminster to this day.

== Early Scropes ==
The first well-documented ancestor of the Yorkshire Scropes appears to be Robert le Scrope (1134 – aft.1198), who is described as the son of the aunt of Alice de Gant, Countess of Northampton by her husband Richard le Scrope. The Scrope family appear to be related and allied to the Gant family in the 12th century, and possibly trace their origins to Lincolnshire or Northamptonshire.

== 14th-century Scropes ==
The shield above depicts the arms of Scrope; its blazon is Azure, a bend Or.

The great-great-great-grandson of Hugh was Sir William le Scrope (c.1259 – c. 1311) of Bolton, in Wensleydale, Yorkshire, who had two sons, Henry le Scrope (died 1336) and Geoffrey le Scrope (died 1340), both of whom were in succession chief justice of the king's bench and prominent supporters of the court in the reign of King Edward II of England.

=== Richard le Scrope (c. 1327 – 1403) ===
Henry was father of Richard Scrope, 1st Baron Scrope of Bolton (c. 1327 – 1403), chancellor of England, an active adherent of John of Gaunt.

=== William le Scrope (c. 1350 – 1399) ===
Richard's eldest son, William le Scrope (c. 1350 – 1399), was created Earl of Wiltshire in 1397 by Richard II, of whose government he was an active supporter. Wiltshire bought the sovereignty of the Isle of Man from the Earl of Salisbury. In 1398 he became Treasurer of England. His execution at Bristol was one of the first acts of Henry IV, and the irregular sentence of an improvised court was confirmed by Henry's first parliament. Wiltshire' father, Lord Scrope, and his other sons were not included in the attainder, but received full pardon from Henry. Scrope, who was the builder of Bolton Castle, his principal residence, died in 1403. He was succeeded in the barony by his second son, Roger, whose descendants held it until 1630.

=== Geoffrey le Scrope (d. 1340) ===
Sir Geoffrey le Scrope (died 1340), chief justice of the kings bench as mentioned above, uncle of the first Baron Scrope of Bolton, had a son Henry, who in 1350 was summoned to parliament by writ as Baron Scrope, the designation of Masham being added in the time of his grandson to distinguish the title from that held by the elder branch of the family. Henry's fourth son was Richard le Scrope (c. 1350 – 1405), Archbishop of York, who took part with the Percys in opposition to Henry IV, and was beheaded for treason in June 1405. Despite this, Henry Scrope, 3rd Baron Scrope of Masham (c. 1376 – 1415), became a favourite of Henry V, by whom he was made treasurer in 1410 and employed on diplomatic missions abroad. However, in 1415 he was involved in a conspiracy to assassinate Henry (along with the King's cousin Richard of Conisburgh, 3rd Earl of Cambridge) and was ignominiously executed at Southampton. His title was forfeited. It was, however, restored to his brother John in 1455; and it fell into abeyance on the death, in 1517, of Geoffrey, 11th Baron Scrope of Masham, without male heirs.

== 16th- and 17th-century Scropes ==
John Scrope, 8th Baron Scrope of Bolton was a somewhat reluctant supporter of the Pilgrimage of Grace, a northern uprising in protest at the reforms of Henry VIII but incurred the king's displeasure when he allowed sanctuary to Adam Sedbar, Abbot of Jervaulx who was on the run from the King's Commissioners. Scrope was himself obliged to seek refuge in Skipton castle and the King's men fired his Bolton castle residence. Abbot Sedbar was caught and executed.

His son Henry Scrope, 9th Baron Scrope of Bolton (1534–1592), was governor of Carlisle in the time of Elizabeth I, and as such took charge of Mary, Queen of Scots, when she crossed the border in 1568; and he took her to Bolton Castle, where she remained till January 1569.

His son, Sir Thomas Scrope, 10th Baron Scrope of Bolton, was Warden of the West March in the Anglo-Scottish border country and governor of Carlisle in 1596 when Walter Scott, the "Bold Buccleuch", staged his raid on Carlisle to rescue the reiver Kinmont Willie Armstrong.

He was the father of Emanuel Scrope, 11th baron (1584-1630), who was created Earl of Sunderland in 1627; on his death without legitimate issue in 1630 the earldom became extinct, and the immense estates of the Scropes of Bolton were divided among his illegitimate children, the chief portion (including Bolton Castle) passing by marriage to the Marquess of Winchester, who was created Duke of Bolton in 1689; to the Earls Rivers; and to John Grubham Howe, ancestor of the Earls Howe. The barony of Scrope of Bolton seems then to have become dormant; and although the title might, it would appear, have been claimed through the female line by the representative of Charles Jones (d. 1840) of Caton, Lancashire, no such claim was ever made. From Stephen, third son of the 1st Baron Scrope of Bolton, were descended the Scropes of Castle Combe, Wiltshire, the last of whom was William Scrope (1772–1852), an artist, author and fly-fishing enthusiast, who was an intimate friend of Sir Walter Scott. His daughter Emma Phipps Scrope, married George Poulett Thompson (1797–1876), an eminent geologist and prolific political writer, who took the name of Scrope, and who after his wife's death sold Castle Combe, of which he wrote a history. Probably from the same branch of the family was descended Col. Adrian Scrope, or Scroope (1601-1660) the Regicide, who was prominent on the parliamentarian side in the Civil War, and one of the signatories of Charles I's death warrant. Colonel Scrope was grandson of Adrian Scrope of Wormsley, who was (approximately) third son of John Scrope (d. 1547) of Spennithorne, Yorkshire, and Hambleden, Bucks, who was the younger son of the 6th Lord Scrope (c1468-1506) by Lady Eliz. Percy daughter of Henry Percy, 3rd Earl of Northumberland. John Scrope was Adrian Scrope's grandson and the last Scrope of Wormsley and Bristol. The Chiltern estate at Wormsley was inherited by one of John Scrope's nephews; one of the brothers of Thomas Fane, 8th Earl of Westmorland.

== Descendants ==
The male line of the Scrope family still exists but it has for centuries now been known simply as "Scrope of Danby", with no hereditary titles left to its name. Although Bolton Castle is still owned by descendants of the Scrope family, they do not have the name of Scrope, being descendants through the female line of the Duchess of Bolton.

The present senior male of the family, or Head of the House, is Simon Richard Henry ('Harry') Scrope (b. 1974), only son of Simon Egerton Scrope of Danby (1934-2010), by his wife (Jennifer) Jane Parkinson, a granddaughter maternally of the 1st and last Baron Bingley. The next male heir is his father's cousin Henry John Scrope (b. 1941), eldest son of the late Ralph Henry Scrope by his wife Lady Beatrice Savile, 2nd daughter of the 6th Earl of Mexborough. Other Scropes have also married in the 20th century into aristocratic families such as the Cochrane family, the Ward family, the Davies family, the Sykes family of Sledmere and many landed gentry families.

== See also ==
- Scrope v. Grosvenor
- Baron Scrope of Masham
- Baron Scrope of Bolton
- Recusancy
