= Baron Scrope of Masham =

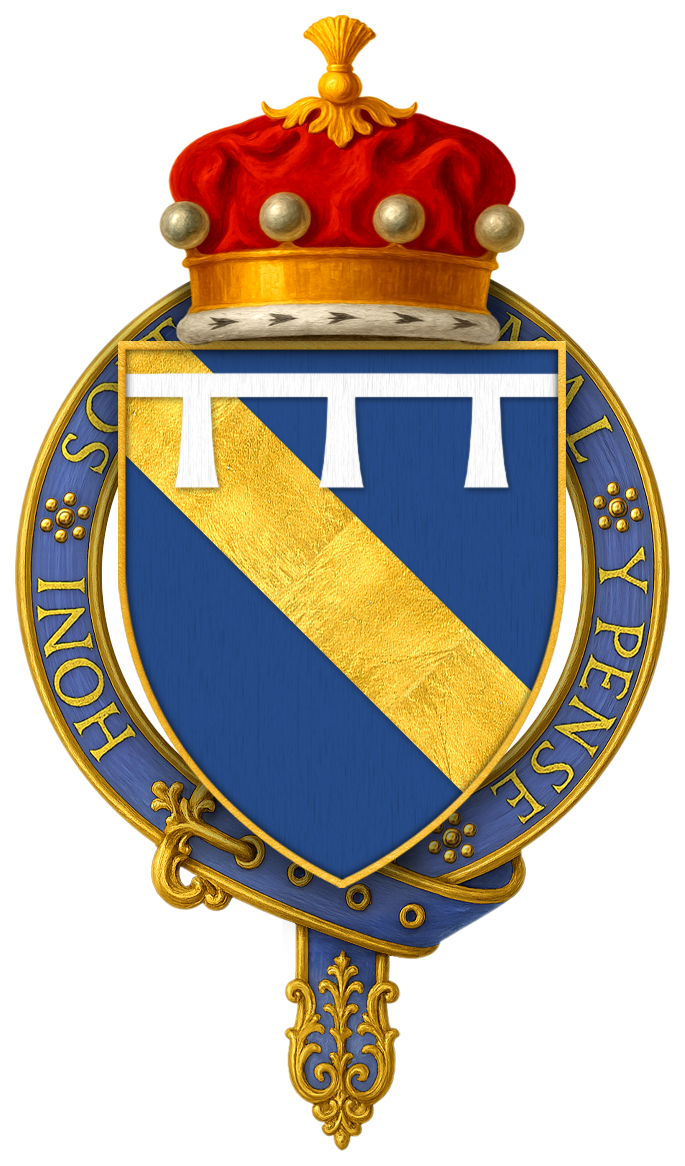
Coat of Arms of Sir Henry Scrope, 3rd Baron Scrope of Masham, KG

Baron Scrope of Masham is an abeyant title in the Peerage of England. It was created on 25 November 1350 as a barony by writ for Henry le Scrope, son of Geoffrey le Scrope and first cousin of Richard le Scrope, 1st Baron Scrope of Bolton. Richard le Scrope, a younger son of the 1st Baron, was Archbishop of York and executed for his role in the Percy revolt of 1405.

The title was abolished by attainder in 1415 after the 3rd Baron was executed as a ringleader in the Southampton Plot, but the title was restored in 1426. It became abeyant in 1517.

== Barons Scrope of Masham (1350) ==
- Henry Scrope, 1st Baron Scrope of Masham (1312–1391)
- Stephen Scrope, 2nd Baron Scrope of Masham (c. 1345–1406)
- Henry Scrope, 3rd Baron Scrope of Masham (c. 1373–1415) (forfeit 1415)
- John Scrope, 4th Baron Scrope of Masham (d. 1455) (restored 1426)
- Thomas Scrope, 5th Baron Scrope of Masham (c. 1428–1475)
- Thomas Scrope, 6th Baron Scrope of Masham (c. 1459–1493)
- Alice Scrope, 7th Baroness Scrope of Masham (d. 1502)
- Elizabeth Scrope, 8th Baroness Scrope of Masham (d. aft. 1502)
- Henry Scrope, 9th Baron Scrope of Masham (d. c. 1512)
- Ralph Scrope, 10th Baron Scrope of Masham (d. 1515)
- Geoffrey Scrope, 11th Baron Scrope of Masham (d. 1517) (abeyant)

== See also ==
- Scrope
