= John Scrope =

John Scrope may refer to:

- John Scrope, 4th Baron Scrope of Masham (c. 1388–1455), English peer, Privy Councillor and Treasurer of England
- John Scrope, 5th Baron Scrope of Bolton (1437–1498), English Yorkist nobleman
- John Scrope, 8th Baron Scrope of Bolton (c. 1510–1549)
- John Scrope (MP) (c. 1662–1752), British lawyer and politician
