= Baron Scrope =

Baron Scrope may refer to:

- Baron Scrope of Masham, an English barony title that became abeyant in 1517
- Baron Scrope of Bolton, an English barony title that became dormant in 1630
