= Stephen Scrope =

Stephen Scrope may refer to:

- Stephen Scrope, 2nd Baron Scrope of Masham (1345–1406)
- Stephen Scrope (deputy lieutenant of Ireland) (c. 1355–1408), whose widow married John Fastolf
- Stephen Scrope (archdeacon) (fl. 1400–1418), archdeacon of Richmond and Craven
- Stephen Scrope (writer) (1397–1472), translator of the Dictes and Sayings of the Philosophers
