= Baron Scrope of Bolton =

Baron Scrope of Bolton was a title in the Peerage of England. It was created for Sir Richard le Scrope as a barony by writ on 8 January 1371. It became dormant on the death of the 11th Baron (1st Earl of Sunderland) in 1630 without legitimate children.

== Barons Scrope of Bolton (1371) ==
- Richard Scrope, 1st Baron Scrope of Bolton (c. 1327–1403)
- Roger Scrope, 2nd Baron Scrope of Bolton (d. 1403)
- Richard Scrope, 3rd Baron Scrope of Bolton (1393–1420)
- Henry Scrope, 4th Baron Scrope of Bolton (1418–1459)
- John Scrope, 5th Baron Scrope of Bolton (1435–1498)
- Henry Scrope, 6th Baron Scrope of Bolton (d. 1506)
- Henry Scrope, 7th Baron Scrope of Bolton (c. 1480–1533)
- John Scrope, 8th Baron Scrope of Bolton (d. 1549)
- Henry Scrope, 9th Baron Scrope of Bolton (c. 1534–1591)
- Thomas Scrope, 10th Baron Scrope of Bolton (c. 1567–1609)
- Emanuel Scrope, 1st Earl of Sunderland, 11th Baron Scrope of Bolton (1584–1630)

== Title dormant 1630 to 1731 and 1814 to ?? ==
Emanuel Scrope, 1st Earl of Sunderland (1 August 1584 – 30 May 1630) married on 9 September 1609 Elizabeth Manners (c.1587 – 16 Mar 1653), daughter of John Manners, 4th Earl of Rutland (c.1550 – 24 February 1588) and Elizabeth Charlton; they had four children who all died young. He left his estates to his illegitimate children, not his legitimate relatives, thus enriching families such as the Paulets (future Dukes of Bolton) and the Howes (future Earls Howe). By his servant and mistress Martha Jeanes, or Janes, or Jones, alias San(d)ford, he had one son John (who died childless) and three daughters, who all survived and left children:

Elizabeth Scrope – married Thomas Savage (3rd Earl Rivers)
Annabella Scrope ( – 30 March 1704) – married John Grubham Howe
Mary Scrope ( – 1 November 1680) – married Charles Paulet (1st Duke of Bolton)

The 11th baron's cousin Mary Eure did not claim the barony which passed eventually to her descendant Mrs Mary Johnson (1651–1731), de jure 16th Baroness Scrope of Bolton. The claim fell into abeyance from 1731 to 1814, and eventually passed to her grandson Charles Jones, de jure 17th Baron Scrope of Bolton (1774–1840) and then to his second but eldest surviving son Henry James Jones, de jure 18th Baron Scrope of Bolton (b. 1812). None of the Jones attempted to claim the dormant barony, possibly for financial reasons (it being costly to prove the extinction of all other co-heirs before the Committee for Privileges). The de jure 17th Baron Charles Jones was a first cousin of Charles Howard, 11th Duke of Norfolk (1746–1815).

== See also ==
- Scrope family.
