= Henry Scrope, 7th Baron Scrope of Bolton =

Henry Scrope, 7th Baron Scrope of Bolton, KB, (c. 1480-1533) was son and heir of Henry Scrope, 6th Baron Scrope of Bolton.

== Early life and marriage ==
His father died at some point in 1506; in November that year, Henry Scrope received livery of his inheritance on 15 November that year. Henry VIII was crowned King of England on 23 June 1509, and at which occasion Henry Scrope was made a Knight Banneret.

== Career ==
He was present at the Battle of Flodden in 1513, and was subsequently summoned to parliament between 1514 and 29. He continued to serve on the border in the early 1520s, being at Newcastle in the company of the earl of Surrey in 1523. He attended to various aspects of royal administration in Yorkshire, including a commission of the peace in 1512, assessing the taxable population ahead of the 1527 subsidy, and was in attendance on the Scottish Queen, Margaret Tudor. He supported King Henry's attempt to divorce Katherine of Aragon, being a signatory to a 13 July 1530 letter from the Lords Spiritual and Temporal to Pope Clement VII, pleading the king's case. In the early 1530s, Scrope was under pressure from King Henry to sell his 'Pisho' estate in Hertfordshire to the king, who desired to augment his royal Hunsdon lordship. This manor had been held by the Scrope family since 1393, and Henry Scrope wanted to swap it for other lands rather than sell it for cash, and it seems likely that he bribed Cromwell to reach this end, though Cromwell did not accept the bribe. Scrope had died, however, before negotiations were complete.

== Marriages ==
Henry Scrope appears to have married, at the age of fourteen, his cousin Alice Scrope (who was aged approximately 12). She was, suo jure, Baroness Scrope of Masham, her father being Thomas Scrope, 6th Baron Scrope of Masham and her mother, Elizabeth, who was a daughter of John Neville, 1st Marquess of Montagu. Alice was dead by 1510, and at some point, Henry Scrope married a second time. This was to another member of the Yorkshire nobility, Mabel, daughter of Thomas, Lord Dacre of Gisland, by his wife Elizabeth Greystoke, herself Baroness Greystoke in own right.

== Death ==
He died, between October and December 1533, and was buried alongside his ancestors, in Wensley, North Yorkshire. His second wife outlived him. He had had no children by his first marriage, but had three sons by Mabel, the eldest of whom, John, succeeded him to the barony, and who the year after his father died, concluded the Pisho estate negotiations, being 'eventually forced to settle for money rather than land' from the crown.

Letters between his father-in-law Thomas, Lord Dacre of Gisland and Lady Maud Parr for the marriage of his son (and heir), Henry le Scrope, to her daughter, Katherine Parr survive. The marriage never happened as Scrope wasn’t sold on it, but she would go on to become Queen Consort to King Henry VIII. The younger Henry would die young, never fulfilling his father’s titles.

== Ancestry ==
Ancestors of Henry Scrope, 7th Baron Scrope of Bolton

16. Richard Scrope, 3rd Baron Scrope of Bolton
8. Henry Scrope, 4th Baron Scrope of Bolton
17. Lady Margaret Neville
4. John Scrope, 5th Baron Scrope of Bolton
18. John Scrope, 4th Baron Scrope of Masham
9. Elizabeth Scrope
19. Maud Chaworth
2. Henry Scrope, 6th Baron Scrope of Bolton
20. Henry FitzHugh, 3rd Baron FitzHugh
10. William FitzHugh, 4th Baron FitzHugh
21. Elizabeth Grey
5. Joan FitzHugh
22. William Willoughby, 5th Baron Willoughby de Eresby
11. Margery Willoughby
23. Lucy le Strange
1. Henry Scrope, 7th Baron Scrope of Bolton
24. Henry "Hotspur" Percy
12. Henry Percy, 2nd Earl of Northumberland
25. Elizabeth Mortimer, Baroness Camoys
6. Henry Percy, 3rd Earl of Northumberland
26. Ralph Neville, 1st Earl of Westmorland
13. Lady Eleanor Neville
27. Lady Joan Beaufort
3. Lady Elizabeth Percy
28. Robert Poynings, 4th Baron Poynings
14. Sir Richard Poynings
29. Eleanor Grey
7. Eleanor Poynings, Baroness Poynings
30. Sir John Berkeley
15. Eleanor Berkeley, Countess of Arundel
31. Elizabeth Bettesthorne
