= William Orde-Powlett, 5th Baron Bolton =

British politician (1869–1944)

The Right Honourable The Lord Bolton JP DL
- Baron Bolton in 1925

Member of Parliament for Richmond
- In office 1910–1918
- Preceded by: Sir Francis Dyke Acland
- Succeeded by: Murrough Wilson

Personal details
- Born: William George Algar Orde-Powlett; 21 August 1869
- Died: 11 December 1944 (aged 75)
- Spouse: Hon. Elizabeth Mary Gibson (m. 1893; died 1943)
- Relations: William Orde-Powlett, 3rd Baron Bolton (grandfather); Richard Lumley, 9th Earl of Scarbrough (grandfather)
- Children: 3
- Parent(s): William Orde-Powlett, 4th Baron Bolton; Lady Algitha Frederica Mary Lumley
- Education: Eton College
- Alma mater: Royal Military College, Sandhurst

William George Algar Orde-Powlett, 5th Baron Bolton JP DL (21 August 1869 – 11 December 1944) was a British peer and Conservative Party politician.

== Early life ==
Orde-Powlett was born on 21 August 1869. He was the eldest son of William Orde-Powlett, 4th Baron Bolton of Bolton Castle (son of William Orde-Powlett, 3rd Baron Bolton) and Lady Algitha Frederica Mary Lumley (the daughter of Richard Lumley, 9th Earl of Scarbrough).

He was educated at Eton College and the Royal Military College, Sandhurst.

== Career ==
He was commissioned as a second lieutenant in the East Yorkshire Regiment however transferred to the King's Royal Rifle Corps on 24 July 1889. He was promoted Lieutenant 1 July 1891 but resigned his commission on 18 May 1892.

He was commissioned as a second lieutenant in the Yorkshire Hussars on 16 March 1898 and subsequently promoted Lieutenant, however he resigned his commission in April 1902. The following month, on 28 May 1902, he was appointed major of the 1st Volunteer Battalion, the Princess of Wales's Own (Yorkshire Regiment). He later served with the Yorkshire Regiment during the First World War and retired with the rank of lieutenant colonel. From 1910 to 1918 he was MP for Richmond. From 1935 to 1944 he was Lord Lieutenant of the North Riding of Yorkshire

== Personal life ==
On 6 June 1893, he married Hon. Elizabeth Mary Gibson (1871, d. 9 December 1943) at St George's, Hanover Square. She was a daughter of Edward Gibson, 1st Baron Ashbourne and the former Frances Maria Adelaide Colles. Together, they were the parents of:

- Hon. William Percy Orde-Powlett (1894–1915), who was killed in action at the Second Battle of Ypres in May 1915 during World War I.
- Hon. Elaine Letitia Algitha Orde-Powlett (1895–1984), who married Rt. Rev. Percy Mark Herbert, son of Maj.-Gen. William Henry Herbert, in 1922.
- Nigel Amyas Orde-Powlett, 6th Baron Bolton (1900–1963), who married Victoria Mary Villiers, daughter of Henry Montagu Villiers, in 1928.

Lady Bolton died on 9 December 1943 and Lord Bolton died just over a year later on 11 December 1944 at age 75. He was succeeded in the barony by his surviving son, Nigel.

== Notes ==
Parliament of the United Kingdom
Preceded by Sir Francis Dyke Acland	Member of Parliament for Richmond; 1910–1918	Succeeded by Murrough Wilson
Peerage of Great Britain
Preceded by William Orde-Powlett	Baron Bolton; 1922–1944	Succeeded by Nigel Orde-Powlett
Honorary titles
Preceded by Geoffrey Howard	Lord Lieutenant of the North Riding of Yorkshire; 1935–1944	Succeeded by Murrough Wilson
