= William Scrope =

English painter

William Scrope (1772–1852) was an English sportsman and amateur artist, known as a writer on sports.

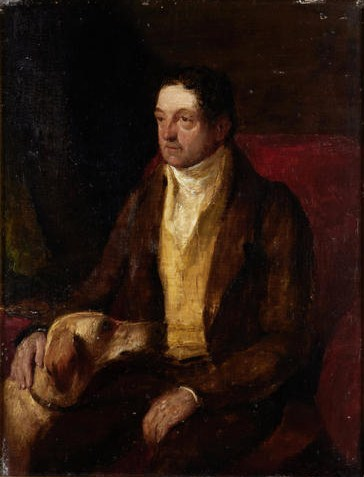
William Scrope, self-portrait

== Life ==
He was son of Richard Scrope, D.D., and succeeded to the property of the Scropes of Castle Combe, Wiltshire, on the death of his father in 1787. In 1795 the Scrope estates of Cockerington, Lincolnshire, also passed to him. He was a classical scholar, a sportsman devoted to deer-stalking and salmon-fishing, and landscape artist.

Scrope rented a place near Melrose, where he lived on good terms with Sir Walter Scott. He was a member of the Accademia di San Luca of Rome, and a fellow of the Linnean Society. He died at his house in Belgrave Square, London, on 20 July 1852.

== Works ==
Scrope published two books, The Art of Deerstalking (1838, reissued 1885), and Days and Nights of Salmon-fishing in the Tweed, (1843, reissued 1883). They were both illustrated with plates after Edwin Landseer, Charles Landseer, David Wilkie, William Simson, and others.

Painting views in Scotland, Italy, Sicily, and elsewhere, Scrope exhibited occasionally at the Royal Academy, and later at the British Institution, of which he was an active director. He was frequently assisted in his work by William Simson, R.S.A.

== Family ==
Scrope was a direct descendant of Richard le Scrope, 1st Baron Scrope of Bolton, and was the last male representative of his family. He married, in 1794, Emma Long, daughter of Charles Long, of Grittleton, Wiltshire, and had an only daughter and heir, Emma Phipps; she married, in 1821, George Poulett Thomson, who then assumed the name and arms of Scrope.

== Notes ==
Attribution

This article incorporates text from a publication now in the public domain: Lee, Sidney, ed. (1897). "Scrope, William (1772-1852)". Dictionary of National Biography. Vol. 51. London: Smith, Elder & Co.
