= William Orde-Powlett, 3rd Baron Bolton =

English landowner

The Right Honourable The Lord Bolton DL
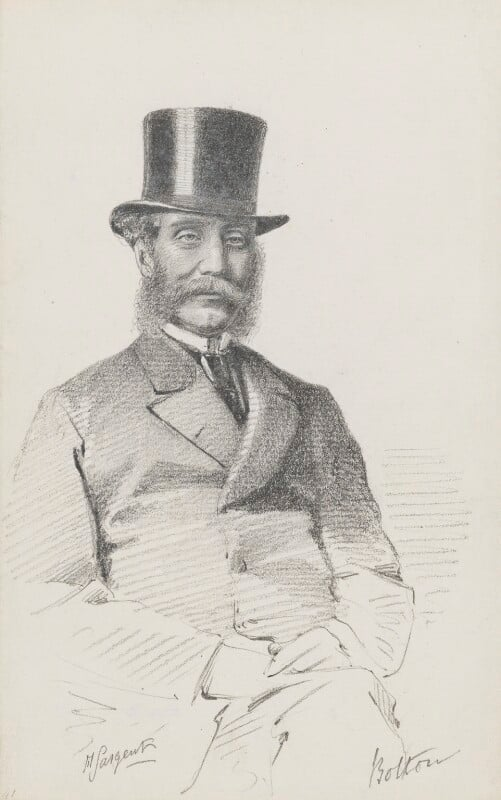
- Born: William Henry Orde-Powlett; 24 February 1818; Marylebone, London
- Died: 7 November 1895 (aged 77); Bolton Hall, Yorkshire
- Education: Trinity College, Cambridge
- Spouse: Letitia Crawfurd (m. 1844; died 1882)
- Children: 5
- Parent(s): Hon. Thomas Orde-Powlett; Letitia O'Brien
- Relatives: Thomas Orde-Powlett, 1st Baron Bolton (grandfather); William Orde-Powlett, 5th Baron Bolton (grandson)

William Henry Orde-Powlett, 3rd Baron Bolton DL (24 February 1818 – 7 November 1895) was an English landowner.

== Early life ==
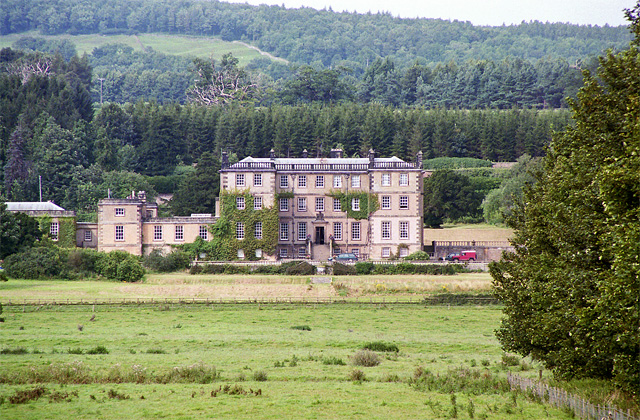
Bolton Hall, Yorkshire

Orde-Powlett was born on 24 February 1818 at Weymouth Street in Marylebone, London and was baptised on 7 March 1818 at St Marylebone Parish Church, London. He was the son of Hon. Thomas Powlett Orde-Powlett (c. 1787–1843) and Letitia O'Brien (d. 1859). His two younger brothers were the Rev. Hon. Thomas Orde-Powlett and Hon. Amias Charles Orde-Powlett.

His paternal grandparents were Thomas Orde-Powlett, 1st Baron Bolton and the former Jean Mary Browne-Powlett (the illegitimate daughter of Charles Powlett, 5th Duke of Bolton). (Note: Jean's father, Charles Powlett, 5th Duke of Bolton, entailed most of his extensive estates to her in default of male issue of his younger brother Harry Powlett, 6th Duke of Bolton. When the 6th Duke died without male heirs in 1794, the Dukedom became extinct, and the inheritance passed to Thomas Orde in right of his wife. The properties with attached farms included Bolton Hall and Bolton Castle in North Yorkshire and Hackwood Park, Old Basing, Hampshire.) His maternal grandfather was Henry O'Brien, who lived at Blatherwick Park.

He was educated at Trinity College, Cambridge.

== Career ==
He succeeded as the 3rd Baron Bolton of Bolton Castle, County of York on 13 July 1850, following the death of his uncle, William Orde-Powlett, 2nd Baron Bolton (MP for Yarmouth (IoW)), who had married Hon. Maria Carleton (daughter of Gen. Guy Carleton, 1st Baron Dorchester) but had no children. He held the office of Deputy Lieutenant for North Riding of Yorkshire, and was a magistrate of the Wensleydale Long Wool Sheep Breeders' Association and Flock Book Society.

== Personal life ==
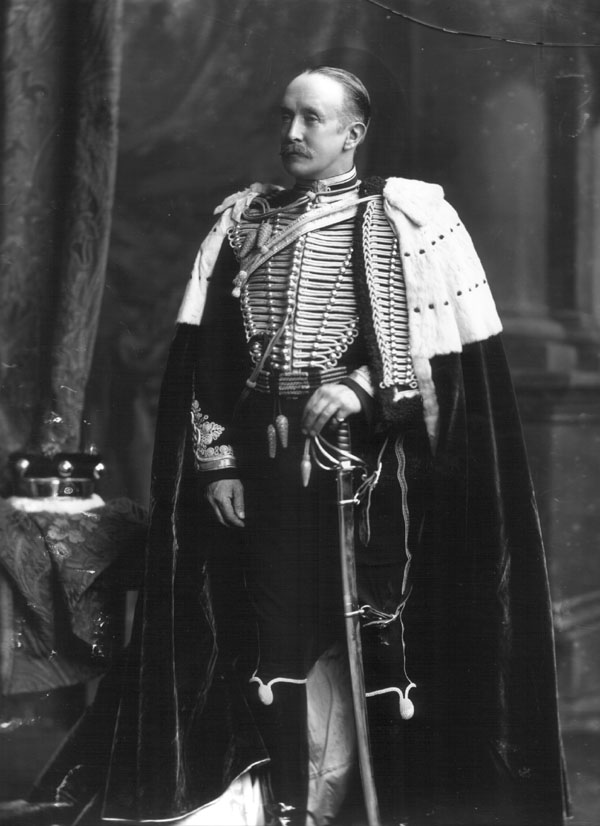
Photograph of his son, the 4th Baron Bolton, ready for a coronation, 7 August 1902

On 12 March 1844, he married his cousin Letitia Crawfurd at Eastwood, Nottinghamshire. She was the youngest daughter of Col. Robert Crawfurd of Newfield, Ayrshire. Together, they were the parents of:

- Hon. Jean Mary Orde-Powlett (d. 1931), who married Col. Hon. Augustus Murray Cathcart, son of Charles Cathcart, 2nd Earl Cathcart, in 1866.
- William Thomas Orde-Powlett, 4th Baron Bolton (1845–1922), who married Lady Algitha Lumley, daughter of Richard Lumley, 9th Earl of Scarbrough, in 1868.
- Hon. Henry Robert Orde-Powlett (1846–1915), who married Henrietta Cathcart de Trafford, daughter of John Randolphus de Trafford (son of Sir Thomas de Trafford, Bt) and Lady Adelaide Cathcart (a daughter of Charles Cathcart, 2nd Earl Cathcart), in 1877.
- Hon. Frederick Orde-Powlett (1849–1858), who died young.
- Hon. Amias Lucien Orde-Powlett (1855–1905), who died unmarried.

Lady Bolton died on 4 January 1882. Lord Bolton died on 7 November 1895 at age 77 at Bolton Hall, Yorkshire. He was buried at Wensley, Yorkshire. His will was proven, by probate, at £224,590.

== Notes ==
Peerage of Great Britain
Preceded by William Orde-Powlett	Baron Bolton; 1850–1895	Succeeded by William Thomas Orde-Powlett
