= Campbell-Orde baronets =

Title in the Baronetage of Great Britain

Escutcheon of the Campbell-Orde baronets of Morpeth

The Orde, later Campbell-Orde baronetcy, of Morpeth in the County of Northumberland, is a title in the Baronetage of Great Britain. It was created on 9 August 1790 for the naval commander John Orde. He was the younger brother of Thomas Orde-Powlett, 1st Baron Bolton.

The 3rd Baronet assumed in 1880 by Royal licence the additional surname of Campbell, which was that of his maternal grandfather Peter Campbell of Kilmory House.

The title is as of 2026 marked vacant on the Official Roll.

== Orde, later Campbell-Orde baronets, of Morpeth (1790) ==
- Sir John Orde, 1st Baronet (1751–1824)
- Sir John Powlett Orde, 2nd Baronet (1803–1878)
- Sir John William Powlett Campbell-Orde, 3rd Baronet (1827–1897)
- Sir Arthur John Campbell-Orde, 4th Baronet (1865–1933)
- Sir Simon Arthur Campbell-Orde, 5th Baronet (1907–1969)
- Sir John Alexander Campbell-Orde, 6th Baronet (1943–2016)
- Sir John Simon Arthur Campbell-Orde, presumed 7th Baronet (born 1981), does not appear on the Official Roll of the Baronetage.

=== Sir John Powlett Orde, 2nd Baronet ===
Sir John Powlett Orde, 2nd Baronet (9 June 1803 – 13 December 1878) was born at Gloucester Place, St Marylebone, London, the son of Sir John Orde, 1st Baronet, and was educated at Eton College. He matriculated in 1821 at Christ Church, Oxford where he graduated B.A. in 1826.

Orde married in 1826 into a planter family in Jamaica. His wife was Eliza Campbell (died 1829), eldest daughter and co-heir of Peter Campbell, of Kilmory, Argyll. On the death of her grandfather Peter Campbell the elder in 1818, owner of four slave-run estates in Jamaica, she was left money; when their father died in 1823, Eliza and her sister Caroline inherited the mortgaged plantation property known as Holland Estate and "Shaws", with 308 enslaved people. By the time of the Slave Compensation Act 1837, all compensation was paid to mortgagees, the principal one being John Gladstone.

The couple had one son, the future 3rd Baronet, and two daughters. On Eliza's death in 1829 Orde inherited property in Jamaica and Scotland. He married secondly, in 1832, Beatrice Edwards: they had two sons and a daughter.

Orde rebuilt Kilmory Castle in a Gothic style, from 1828 to 1836. The design was by a London architect, J. G. Davis, and he remodelled the grounds with the aid of William Jackson Hooker.

== See also ==
- Baron Bolton

Baronetage of Great Britain
Preceded by Oakeley baronets	Orde baronets of Morpeth; 9 August 1790	Succeeded by Malet baronets
