= John Pelham (English parliamentarian) =

English landowner and administrator (died 1429)

Sir John de Pelham (died 1429) was an English parliamentarian who served as Treasurer of England.

== Biography ==
=== Early life ===
John de Pelham was the son of Sir John Pelham, a Sussex knight who fought in the wars of Edward III in France, and of his wife Joan Herbert of Winchelsea. He was in the service of John of Gaunt, Duke of Lancaster, and afterwards of his son, Henry, Earl of Derby, subsequently Henry IV. On 7 December 1393 he was appointed by John of Gaunt constable of Pevensey Castle for life. He was possibly one of the scanty band that landed with Henry at Ravenspur in 1399, and was certainly with him at Pontefract soon after his landing. Meanwhile his wife Joan Pelham sustained something like a siege from Richard's partisans in Pevensey Castle. An interesting letter, written in Middle English and dated 25 July 1399, from Joan to John is printed in Collins's Peerage. Hallam, who reprints it in modern spelling, describes it as "one of the earliest instances of female penmanship". (Note: "My dear Lord,—I recommend me to your high lordship with heart and body and all my poor might, and with all this I thank you as my dear lord dearest and best beloved of all earthly lords I say for me, and thank you my dear lord with all this that I say before of your comfortable letter that ye sent me from Pontefract that come to me on Mary Magdalene day; for by my troth I was never so glad as when I heard by your letter that ye were strong enough with the grace of God for to keep you from the malice of your enemies. And dear Lord if it like to your high lordship that as soon as ye might that I might hear of your gracious speed; which as God Almighty continue and increase. And my dear lord if it like you for to know of my fare, I am hereby laid in manner of a siege with the county of Sussex, Surrey, and a great parcel of Kent, so that I may nought out no none victuals get me but with much hard. Wherefore my dear if it like you by the advice of your wise counsel for to get remedy of the salvation of your castle and withstand the malice of the shires aforesaid. And also that ye be fully informed of their great malice workers in these shires which that have so despitefully wrought to you, and to your castle, to your men, and to your tenants for this country have they wasted for a great while. Farewell my dear lord, the Holy Trinity you keep from your enemies, and ever send good tidings of you. Written at Pevensey in the castle on St. Jacob day last past, / By your own poor / J. Pelham.")

=== Parliament ===
Pelham was knighted at Henry's coronation on 13 October 1399, and is therefore reckoned among the original Knights of the Bath. On 24 October he received the honour of bearing the royal sword before the King. He conducted the deposed Richard II from Leeds Castle in Kent to the Tower. Henry IV granted to Pelham and his heirs male on 12 February 1400 the Constableship of Pevensey and the Honour of Laigle, of which Pevensey was the chief place. This involved a paramount position over the whole Rape of Pevensey. Pelham served as Knight of the Shire for Sussex in the first, second, fourth, fifth, and sixth parliaments of Henry IV, as Sheriff of Surrey and Sussex in 1401. In 1402 he served on a commission to repair the banks of Pevensey marsh, and to draw up a survey and statutes. As Constable of Pevensey he was busied in defending the coast from threatened French invasions. In the Unlearned Parliament of October 1404 he was appointed, with Thomas, Lord Furnival, Treasurer of War to collect the special subsidies granted by the commons, and to apply the results strictly to the purpose for which it was granted. The date of their appointment was 11 November, and their earliest recorded payment was on 18 November. But the task was a thankless one. In the long session of the parliament of 1406 Pelham, who joined with Furnival in begging to be relieved of their duties, was discharged on 19 June by the King, at the request of the estates. But Pelham petitioned for and obtained the appointment of auditors to the war accounts. From these he ultimately obtained his discharge. He was moreover one of the committee appointed to inspect the engrossing of the Roll of Parliament.

=== High Office ===
On 5 February 1405 Pelham was made Keeper of the New Forest, and on 8 December of the same year Steward of the Duchy of Lancaster. In March 1405 Edward, Duke of York, was put under his charge at Pevensey, while in October of the same year Pelham conducted his prisoner to the King's presence, probably at Kenilworth. The state of Pevensey was, however, hardly secure. In October Pelham complained to the Council that the keep had partly fallen down. In February 1406 Pelham had the custody of Edmund, Earl of March, and his brother Roger, with an allowance of five hundred marks a year for their maintenance. In 1409 these prisoners were transferred from his custody to that of the Prince of Wales. In 1407 Pelham became chief butler of Chichester and of all the ports of Sussex. On 22 January 1412 he succeeded Lord Scrope of Masham as Treasurer. This shows that Pelham acted politically along with Archbishop Arundel, who had just been reappointed Chancellor. On 11 July 1412 he was appointed with others to muster the troops going with the Duke of Clarence to Aquitaine. On 12 November 1412 he was rewarded with fresh grants, including the Rape of Hastings, with all the franchises exercised by the Dukes of Brittany and Lancaster, its former lords. He was nominated an executor of Henry IV's will.

After Henry V's accession Pelham was deprived of the Treasury on 21 March, and replaced by the Earl of Arundel. He was still, however, much employed. He was put on a commission appointed on 31 May 1414 to negotiate for an alliance with France, or to revive Henry's claims to the French throne. Pelham is sometimes said to have accompanied Henry V on his Norman expedition in 1417, but it was really his son, John, who did this. In 1414 for a short time he was made guardian of the captive James of Scotland at Pevensey. In February 1415 he received a grant of 700l. for James's custody and maintenance. Many years after, in 1423, he was on the commission appointed to negotiate for King James's release. He was named executor to Thomas, Duke of Clarence. In 1422 Sir John Mortimer was committed to his custody at Pevensey. He was in custody of the queen-dowager Joan of Navarre, who expiated her crime of necromancy by a long imprisonment at Pevensey. He was on a commission to borrow money for the King in Sussex and Kent. He was also an executor of the will of Henry V. Under Henry VI he again sat in Parliament in 1422 and 1427, and in 1423 negotiated for a peace with Scotland and the release of King James.

=== Death ===
Pelham drew up his last will on 8 February 1429, and died four days later. He ordered that his body should be buried in the Cistercian abbey of Robertsbridge. He gave the land for the rebuilding of the Austin priory of Holy Trinity at Hastings, which had to be now removed from its former site within the town, which had been swept away by the sea, to be rebuilt at Warbleton, ten miles away. He was therefore regarded as the founder of the "New Priory of Holy Trinity beside Hastings".

=== Marriage and issue ===
Pelham married Joan, daughter of Sir John Escures, and had by her a son named John, his successor, and two daughters, Agnes and Joan, who respectively married John Colbrond of Boreham, and Sir John St. Clair. A valuation of his estates made in 1403 is printed by Collins and translated by Lower. The rental amounted to the large sum of 870l. 5s. 3d. Besides his wife's letter already mentioned, four familiar letters to him in English are printed by Collins.

== Bibliography ==
- Tout, Thomas Frederick (1895). "Pelham, John de" . In Lee, Sidney (ed.). Dictionary of National Biography. Vol. 44. London: Smith, Elder & Co. pp. 248–250.
