= Castle Bolton =

Village in North Yorkshire, England

Coordinates: 54.322670°N 1.947570°W

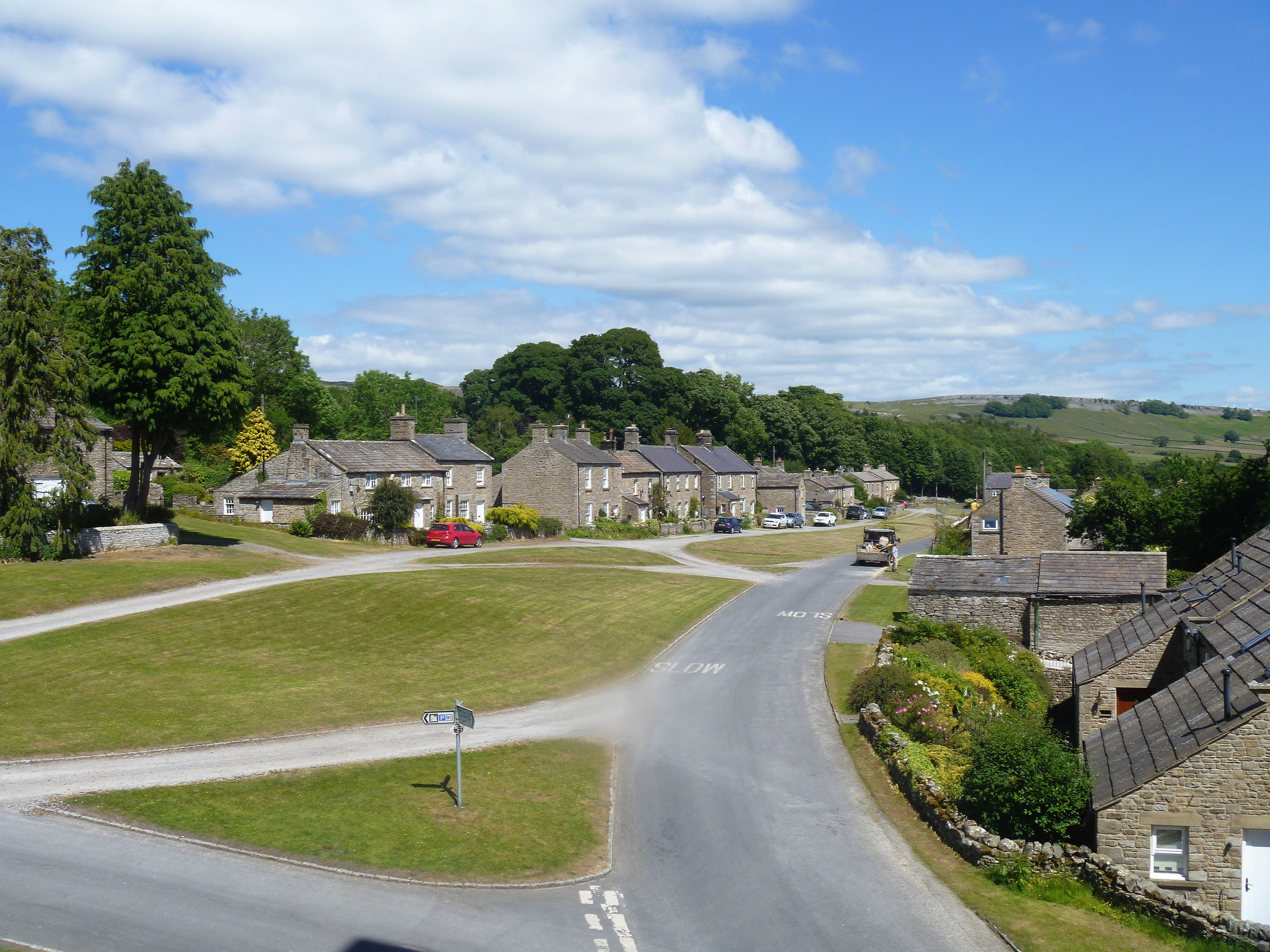
- Castle Bolton village green, from Bolton Castle

- Location within North Yorkshire
- OS grid reference: SE035919
- Unitary authority: North Yorkshire
- Ceremonial county: North Yorkshire
- Region: Yorkshire and the Humber
- Country: England
- Sovereign state: United Kingdom
- Post town: Leyburn
- Postcode district: DL8
- Police: North Yorkshire
- Fire: North Yorkshire
- Ambulance: Yorkshire
- UK Parliament: Richmond and Northallerton

Castle Bolton is a village in North Yorkshire, England. It is in Wensleydale, one of the Yorkshire Dales. The village takes its name from Bolton Castle, which overlooks the west end of the village green. The population of the civil parish was less than 100 at the 2011 census, so details are maintained in the parish of Redmire. In 2015, North Yorkshire County Council estimated the population to be 60.

The village is historically part of the North Riding of Yorkshire. From 1974 to 2023 it was part of the district of Richmondshire, it is now administered by the unitary North Yorkshire Council.

The name Bolton derives from the Old English bōðl-tūn meaning 'a collection of buildings'.

The village was largely constructed after the nearby castle and the houses were used by the retinue of Mary, Queen of Scots when she was imprisoned in the castle. The Dales artist Fred Lawson came for a holiday in 1910, set up his artist's studio in the middle of the village and loved it so much he never left.

== See also ==
- Listed buildings in Castle Bolton with East and West Bolton
