= Listed buildings in Castle Bolton with East and West Bolton =

Castle Bolton with East and West Bolton is a civil parish in the county of North Yorkshire, England. It contains four listed buildings that are recorded in the National Heritage List for England. Of these, one is listed at Grade I, the highest of the three grades, one is at Grade II*, the middle grade, and the others are at Grade II, the lowest grade. The parish contains the village of Castle Bolton and the surrounding area, and the listed buildings consist of a castle in ruins, a church, a house and a telephone kiosk.

== Key ==
Grade	Criteria
I	Buildings of exceptional interest, sometimes considered to be internationally important
II*	Particularly important buildings of more than special interest
II	Buildings of national importance and special interest

== Buildings ==
Name and location	Photograph	Date	Notes	Grade
St Oswald's Church; 54.32245°N 1.94977°W		c. 1350	The church, which has been altered during the centuries, including a restoration in the 19th century, is in stone with a Welsh slate roof. It consists of a nave and a chancel without any division, a south porch, a north heating chamber, and a west tower. The tower has two stages, quoins, a west window with a pointed arch, a lancet window, and two-light bell openings. The porch has a gable with stone copings and shaped kneelers, and contains a doorway with a hollow-chamfered surround.	II*
Bolton Castle; 54.32211°N 1.94962°W		Late 14th century	A ruined castle in stone on plinths with quoins. It consists of four three-storey ranges around a courtyard, with four-storey corner towers, one demolished, and turrets in the centres of the north and south ranges. The gatehouse is in the east range, and has a pointed arch with a chamfered surround, set in a taller arch, and a barrel-vaulted passage. Most of the windows are lancets with cusped heads, and some have been replaced by mullioned and transomed windows.	I
Crayke House; 54.32266°N 1.94698°W		17th century	The house, which was extended to the left in the 19th century, is in stone, partly rendered, with stone slate roofs. There are two storeys, and each part has two bays. The older part contains a doorway, chamfered mullioned windows, and a fire windows with a chamfered surround. The later part is taller, and contains sash windows with deep lintels.	II
Telephone kiosk 54.32234°N 1.94756°W		1935	The K6 type telephone kiosk opposite Rose Cottage was designed by Giles Gilbert Scott. Constructed in cast iron with a square plan and a dome, it has three unperforated crowns in the top panels.	II
