= Thomas Scrope, 5th Baron Scrope of Masham =

British baron (c.1429–1475)

Thomas Scrope, 5th Baron Scrope of Masham (c. 1429-1475) was the third surviving son of John Scrope, 4th Baron Scrope of Masham. He succeeded to his father's title and estates in 1455 at the age of twenty-six, as 5th Baron Scrope of Masham, and was summoned to Parliament from 9 October 1459 until 19 August 1472. He married by settlement, dated 4 May 1453, Elizabeth de Greystoke, daughter of Ralph de Greystoke, 5th Baron Greystoke and Elizabeth FitzHugh. Loyal to King Henry VI of England and the House of Lancaster in the early years of the Wars of the Roses, he was granted an annuity of twenty Marks in 1459, 'for services against the House of York.' He died in 1475; his widow Elizabeth, who married again, survived until the first year of the reign of King Richard III of England, dying in December 1483.

Thomas Scrope and his wife Elizabeth had four sons, all of whom inherited the barony. Thomas Scrope, his namesake and eldest, inherited on his father's death, and his brothers, due to repeated childlessness, inherited in turn; Henry Scrope, Ralph Scrope, and Geoffrey Scrope. The fifth baron also had three daughters; Alice Scrope married Sir James Strangways, the grandson of Sir James Strangways, Margaret Scrope married a cousin, Sir Christopher Danby, Sr. of Farnley, Yorkshire, and their son was Sir Christopher Danby, Jr., and Elizabeth Scrope married Ralph Fitz-Randall, of Spennithorne.
