= Kilmory Castle =

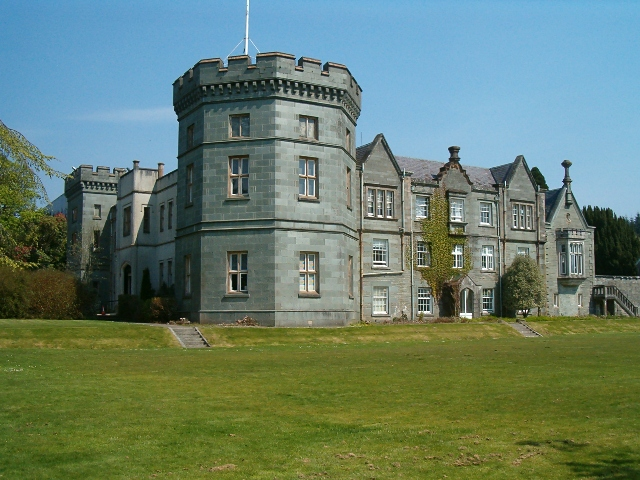
- Kilmory Castle seen from the south-west

- Location within Argyll and Bute
- 56.02567°N 5.42133°W

Listed Building – Category B
- Designated: 20 July 1971
- Reference no.: LB11039

Kilmory Castle, also known as Kilmory House, is a large 19th century house located just to the south of Lochgilphead, in old county Argyll, on the west coast of Scotland. It is currently occupied by the headquarters of the Argyll and Bute Council. The gardens are open to the public and form part of a country park on the former estate. The house is protected as a category B listed building.

== History ==
A house may have stood on the site as early as the 14th century. There was a church at Kilmory in ancient times, and in the 1550s the church and lands of Kilmory were held by the Abbot of Paisley. In 1575, the estate was owned by Donald Campbell of Kilmory, and remained in the Campbell family for over 250 years. Peter Campbell of Kilmory rebuilt the house between 1816 and 1820; his son-in-law Sir John Orde reported that it had previously had a thatched roof.

Orde married Eliza Campbell, the eldest daughter and co-heir of Peter Campbell, in 1826, then purchased the estates following the death of his father-in-law in 1828 and of his wife in 1829. Orde transformed the modest old Campbell house into a grand Gothic-revival mansion designed by architect Joseph Gordon Davis and completed in c. 1830. The core of the older house was retained, but it was thoroughly modernised internally and externally, and extended into an L-shaped plan; a large octagonal tower was added at its west end, with a new wing projecting north from there.

In the centre of the new wing was an arched entrance passage, large enough to admit a coach and four; on the left of this was a kitchen, on the right, an entrance hall, leading into an octagonal dining room in the ground floor of the new tower; from here, a spiral staircase ascended to an octagonal drawing room, from where an anteroom led into a "Chinese drawing room" with fittings obtained directly from China, occupying the entire upper floor of the new wing. Further extensions were carried out to the rear in 1863.

Orde also greatly expanded and improved the grounds and estate, engaging William Hooker to extend the gardens in 1830. In addition, he experimented with introducing foreign animals, with a herd of zebu and some of the larger "Guzorat breed" (i.e. the kankrej from Gujarat), along with a bull of the native wild White Park breed, all of which he cross-bred with Highland cattle and Ayrshire cattle. The herd descended from the White Park bull are the foundation of the modern Vaynol cattle, although all the animals were removed to Wales between 1872 and 1886. In addition, he attempted without success to establish alpaca and llamas at Kilmory, noting that a herd of llamas had done better at Oban, but that the fleece of the alpaca was of far superior quality, although it would not fatten as a meat animal.

Orde was buried in the private burial ground adjacent to the house in 1878. His son succeeded to the baronetcy, and changed his name to Campbell-Orde in 1880. The Campbell-Orde baronets retained the estate until 1938.

In March 1949, an announcement was made that it would open in June as a national holiday centre for young people.

In July 1971, it was designated a category B listed building.

In 1974, Argyll County Council purchased the house to serve as a headquarters for Argyll and Bute District Council, which was formed in 1975. In 1995, local government was reorganised again, although Kilmory remained in use as the headquarters of the new Argyll and Bute unitary authority. An office block extension was built onto the house between 1980 and 1982, to increase the provision of space. Repairs had to carried out following a fire which damaged the west wing in 1984.
