= John Scrope, 8th Baron Scrope of Bolton =

John Scrope, 8th Baron Scrope of Bolton (c. 1510 – 22 June 1549) was the son of Henry Scrope, 7th Baron Scrope of Bolton and Mabel Dacre.

Around 1530 he married Catherine Clifford, daughter of Henry Clifford, 1st Earl of Cumberland in Skipton, Yorkshire. They had 11 children, of whom the eldest was his successor, Henry Scrope, 9th Baron Scrope of Bolton. He lived in the family home in Bolton Castle in Wensleydale, Yorkshire.

In 1536 he was pressured to support the Pilgrimage of Grace, a popular uprising in the Yorkshire area against the religious reforms of Henry VIII, particularly the break with Rome and the Dissolution of the Monasteries, and the policies of the King's chief minister, Thomas Cromwell, as well as other political, social and economic grievances.

He found himself obliged to grant sanctuary to Adam Sedbar, Abbot of Jervaulx, when the latter was on the run from the King's Commissioners, who had been sent north to round up the ringleaders. When the Commissioners arrived at Bolton Castle he fled to join his father-in-law at Skipton Castle but the Abbot was rounded up and ultimately executed. Before leaving the Commissioners fired the castle. However, because of the duress, he was deemed to have been put under he was forgiven and allowed to repair and reoccupy his home and retake his seat in Parliament.

== Ancestry ==
Ancestors of John Scrope, 8th Baron Scrope of Bolton

16. Henry Scrope, 4th Baron Scrope of Bolton
8. John Scrope, 5th Baron Scrope of Bolton
17. Elizabeth Scrope
4. Henry Scrope, 6th Baron Scrope of Bolton
18. William FitzHugh, 4th Baron FitzHugh
9. Joan FitzHugh
19. Margery Willoughby
2. Henry Scrope, 7th Baron Scrope of Bolton
20. Henry Percy, 2nd Earl of Northumberland
10. Henry Percy, 3rd Earl of Northumberland
21. Lady Eleanor Neville
5. Lady Elizabeth Percy
22. Sir Richard Poynings
11. Eleanor Poynings, 5th Baroness Poynings
23. Eleanor Berkeley, Countess of Arundel
1. John Scrope, 8th Baron Scrope of Bolton
24. Thomas Dacre, 6th Baron Dacre
12. Humphrey Dacre, 1st Baron Dacre
25. Lady Philippa Neville
6. Thomas Dacre, 2nd Baron Dacre
26. Sir Thomas Parr of Kendal
13. Mabel Parr
27. Alice Tunstall
3. Mabel Dacre
28. Ralph Greystoke, 5th Baron Greystoke
14. Sir Robert de Greystoke
29. Elizabeth FitzHugh
7. Elizabeth Greystoke, 6th Baroness Greystoke
30. Edmund Grey, 1st Earl of Kent
15. Lady Elizabeth Grey
31. Lady Katherine Percy

Peerage of England
| Preceded by Henry Scrope | Baron Scrope of Bolton c1533–1549 | Succeeded by Henry Scrope |
