= Henry Scrope, 3rd Baron Scrope of Masham =

English baron (1373–1415)

Henry Scrope Baron Scrope of Masham
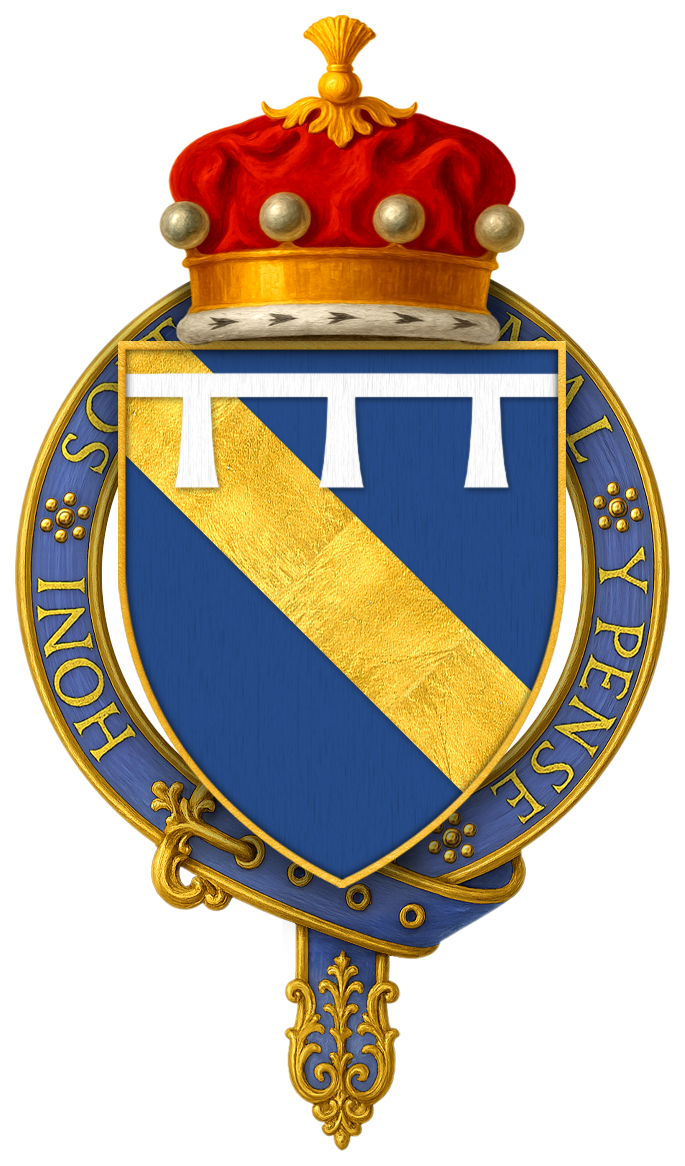
- Arms of Henry Scrope, 3rd Baron Scrope of Masham, KG
- Born: c. 1373
- Died: 5 August 1415; Southampton, Hampshire
- Cause of death: Beheaded
- Spouses: Philippa Bryan; Joan Holland
- Parent(s): Stephen Scrope, 2nd Baron Scrope of Masham; Margery Welles
- Relatives: John Scrope, 4th Baron (brother); Richard Scrope (uncle)
- Family: Scrope of Masham

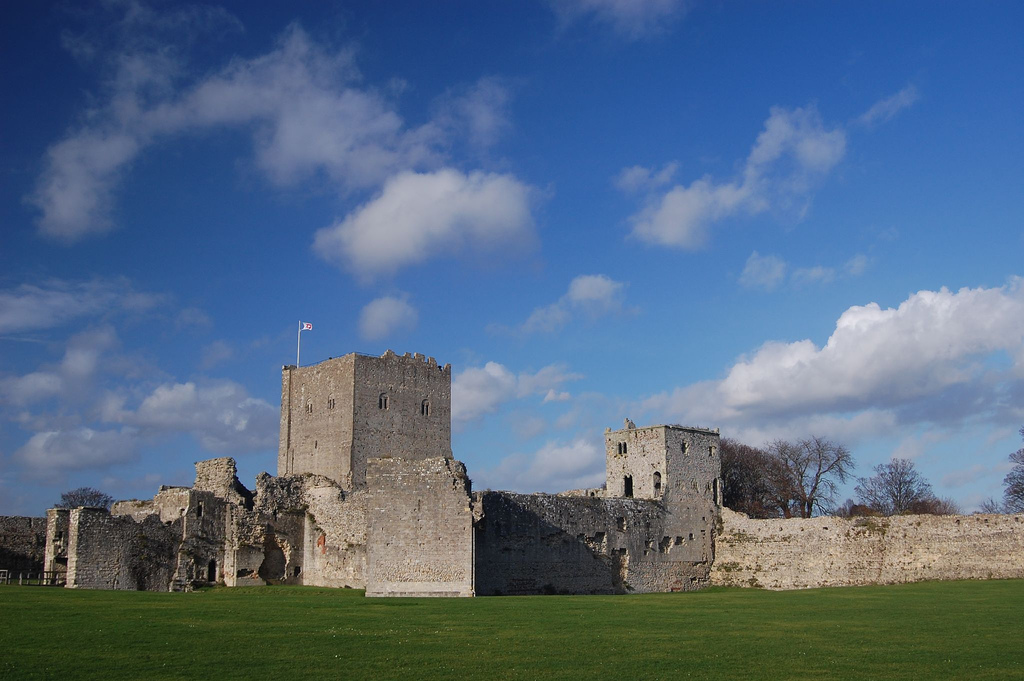
Portchester Castle, where the Southampton plot was revealed to King Henry V

Henry Scrope, 3rd Baron Scrope of Masham KG, also known in older sources as Lord Scrope (c. 1373 – 5 August 1415) was a favourite of Henry V, who performed many diplomatic missions. He was beheaded for his involvement in the notional Southampton Plot to assassinate the king. Some historians believe that the charge was trumped-up to punish him for other acts of disloyalty, and that there may never have been such a plot.

== Family ==
Henry Scrope, born about 1373, (Note: In his inquisitions post mortem he is variously described as being aged 30 to 33 "years and more" at his father's death in 1406 (Cokayne & White 1949, p. 564). Vale (2004), using the former age, dates Scrope's birth to c. 1376, while Pugh (1988, p. 19) rounds it to c. 1370 and Richardson II (2011, pp. 42–43) dates it to c. 1378.) was the eldest son and heir of Stephen Scrope (c. 1345 – 25 January 1406), 2nd Baron Scrope of Masham, and Margery Welles, widow of John de Huntingfield. He had four brothers and one sister:

- Sir Geoffrey Scrope
- Stephen Scrope, Archdeacon of Richmond, Chancellor of Cambridge
- John Scrope, 4th Baron Scrope of Masham
- William Scrope, Archdeacon of Durham
- Maud Scrope, who married Baldwin Freville

== Career ==
In 1390 Scrope accompanied John Beaufort, half-brother of the future King Henry IV, on the Barbary Crusade to Mahdia, but otherwise little is known of his early life. An annuity granted to him by King Richard II was continued by Henry IV after Richard's deposition, and in 1403 Scrope was styled "king's knight", and fought on Henry IV's side at the Battle of Shrewsbury. His uncle, Richard Scrope, Archbishop of York, was executed on 8 June 1405 for taking part in the Northern Rising against the King; however, Henry Scrope was not involved in his uncle's failed rebellion, and was serving the King in Wales when he inherited his father's title and lands in 1406. In 1408 he accompanied Henry IV's daughter, Philippa, to Denmark for her marriage, and in 1409 went to Paris on a diplomatic mission with Henry IV's half-brother, Henry Beaufort.

According to historian James Tait, it was during this period that Scrope came to enjoy the friendship and confidence of the future Henry V, by whose influence he was appointed Treasurer of England in 1410, and made a Knight of the Garter in the same year.

Henry V succeeded his father in 1413, and in 1413 Scrope was sent on several diplomatic missions. In 1414 he accompanied Bishop Henry Chichele to Burgundy to negotiate an alliance.

== Southampton Plot ==
In 1415 Henry V determined to invade France, and in February 1415 Scrope attended a council meeting held for the purpose of planning the forthcoming expedition. However, on 27 May 1415, Scrope was absent from a council meeting. On 31 July Edmund Mortimer, 5th Earl of March informed King Henry that he had just become aware of a plot to murder Henry and put Mortimer on the throne.

Mortimer was the great-grandson of Lionel of Antwerp, Duke of Clarence, second surviving son of King Edward III, and his claim to the throne was thus superior to that of Henry V and his father, Henry IV, who derived their claim from Henry IV's father, John of Gaunt, Duke of Lancaster, third surviving son of Edward III. Moreover, Edmund Mortimer's father, Roger Mortimer, 4th Earl of March, had been widely considered heir presumptive to King Richard II, who had no issue, and Edmund Mortimer himself had been heir presumptive to Richard II while a young child.

The three ringleaders of the plot were Edmund Mortimer's brother-in-law, Richard of Conisburgh, 3rd Earl of Cambridge, who was also the stepson of Scrope's wife, Joan Holland, herself an aunt of Edmund; Sir Thomas Grey, whose son, Thomas, had been betrothed in 1412 to Cambridge's only daughter, Isabel, and Scrope himself.

Richard, Scrope and Grey were promptly arrested. The trial took place in Southampton, on the site now occupied by the Red Lion Inn. Grey was beheaded on 2 August 1415. The most degrading punishment was reserved for Scrope, perhaps because he had been a royal favourite. Prior to his execution, Scrope was dragged across Southampton from the Watergate to the north gate, where he and Cambridge were beheaded on 5 August 1415. Scrope's head was sent to York, to be put on a spike on Micklegate Bar.

Scrope's involvement in the conspiracy surprised contemporaries and continues to puzzle historians. Ian Mortimer claims Scrope had merely insinuated himself into the confidence of Cambridge and Grey in order to betray the conspiracy, just as Edward, Duke of York, had done with the Epiphany Rising in 1400, but was forestalled by Edmund Mortimer's revelation of the conspiracy to the King on 31 July. Pugh, however, finds Scrope's exculpatory statements at trial unconvincing, and states that Scrope never pretended that he had intended to inform the King of the conspiracy. Pugh also contends that "there was no plot in 1415 to assassinate Henry V and his three brothers and that heinous charge, by far the most sensational in the indictment, was fabricated to ensure that Cambridge, Grey and Scrope did not escape the death penalty as a well-deserved punishment for the various other offences that they undoubtedly had committed".

The Southampton Plot is dramatised in Shakespeare's Henry V, and in the anonymous play The History of Sir John Oldcastle.

== Marriages ==
Scrope married, firstly, before 5 February 1398, Philippa Bryan (d. 19 November 1406), the widow of Sir John Devereux (d. 13 November 1396), and daughter and co-heiress of Guy de Bryan, 1st Baron Bryan.

He married, secondly, by licence dated 6 September 1410, Lady Joan Holland (d.1434), the daughter of Thomas Holland, 2nd Earl of Kent, and Alice FitzAlan, and widow, firstly, of Edmund of Langley, 1st Duke of York, and, secondly, William Willoughby, 5th Lord Willoughby. Joan's paternal grandparents were Thomas Holland, 1st Earl of Kent, and Joan of Kent, mother of King Richard II by her second marriage to Edward the Black Prince. Joan's father was, thus, a half-brother of Richard II.

Joan was the sister of Eleanor Holland, Countess of March, mother of Edmund Mortimer, 5th Earl of March, who was the focus of the Southampton Plot.

After Scrope's death, Joan married, fourthly, Sir Henry Bromflete, Baron Vessy.

Scrope had no issue by either of his wives, and was succeeded by his brother, John Scrope, 4th Baron Scrope of Masham, who did not recover the forfeited Scrope lands until 1442.

== Bibliography ==
- Cokayne, George Edward (1932). The Complete Peerage, edited by H.A. Doubleday. Vol. VIII. London: St. Catherine Press. pp. 445–53.
- Cokayne, G.E.; White, G.H., eds. (1949). The Complete Peerage. Vol. XI. London: St. Catherine Press.
- Mortimer, Ian (2009). 1415: Henry V's Year of Glory. London: The Bodley Head. ISBN 978-0-224-07992-1.
- Pugh, T.B. (1988). Henry V and the Southampton Plot of 1415. Stroud: Alan Sutton. ISBN 0-86299-549-3.
- Richardson, Douglas (2011). Magna Carta Ancestry: A Study in Colonial and Medieval Families, ed. Kimball G. Everingham. Vol. II (2nd ed.). Salt Lake City. ISBN 1449966381
- Richardson, Douglas (2011). Magna Carta Ancestry: A Study in Colonial and Medieval Families, ed. Kimball G. Everingham. Vol. III (2nd ed.). Salt Lake City. ISBN 144996639X
- Richardson, Douglas (2011). Magna Carta Ancestry: A Study in Colonial and Medieval Families, ed. Kimball G. Everingham. Vol. IV (2nd ed.). Salt Lake City. ISBN 1460992709
- Tait, James (1897). Scrope, Henry le (1376?-1415). Vol. 51. Dictionary of National Biography, 1885–1890. pp. 139–140.
- Tyerman, Christopher (1988). England and the Crusades 1095-1588. Chicago: Chicago University Press.
- Vale, Brigette (2004). "Scrope, Henry, third Baron Scrope of Masham". Oxford Dictionary of National Biography (online) (online ed.). Oxford University Press. doi:10.1093/ref:odnb/24959. (Subscription, Wikipedia Library access or UK public library membership required.)
- Works related to Henry Scrope, 3rd Baron Scrope of Masham at Wikisource: Dictionary of National Biography, 1885–1900, Volume 51

Political offices
Preceded by Sir John Tiptoft	Lord Treasurer; 1410–1411	Succeeded by Sir John Pelham
Peerage of England
Preceded by Stephen Scrope	Baron Scrope of Masham; 1406–1415	Forfeit Title next held by John Scrope
