= Murrough Wilson =

British politician

Lieutenant-Colonel Sir Murrough John Wilson KBE
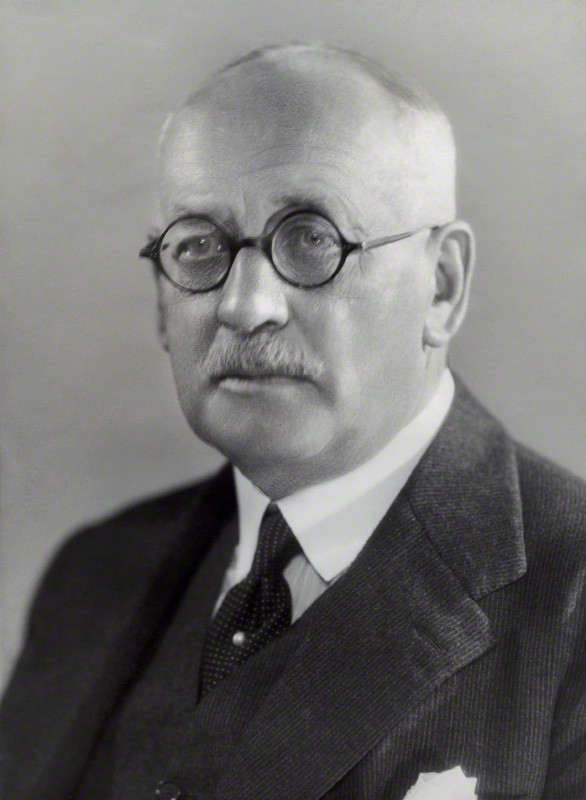

Member of Parliament for Richmond (Yorks)
- In office 14 December 1918 – 10 May 1929
- Preceded by: The Hon. William Orde-Powlett
- Succeeded by: Thomas Dugdale

Personal details
- Born: 14 September 1875 Cliffe Hall, North Riding of Yorkshire
- Died: 20 April 1946 (aged 70) Cliffe Hall, North Riding of Yorkshire
- Party: Unionist
- Relations: Sir Frank O'Brien Wilson (brother); James Edward Ramsden (grandnephew)
- Education: Marlborough College

Military service
- Allegiance: United Kingdom
- Branch/service: British Army; Territorial Army
- Years of service: 1914–1918
- Rank: Lieutenant-Colonel
- Battles/wars: First World War

Lieutenant-Colonel Sir Murrough John Wilson KBE (14 September 1875 – 20 April 1946) was a British Army officer, member of parliament, and railway executive. He served as the Unionist MP for Richmond (Yorkshire) from 1918 to 1929.

== Life ==
He was born at Cliffe Hall, the son of Col. John Gerald Wilson CB and his wife Angelina Rosa Geraldine O'Brien. His father was an officer in the York and Lancaster Regiment, and died of wounds during the Second Boer War, at the Battle of Tweebosch. Murrough Wilson was one of seven children, and the second-oldest of four brothers. The oldest brother, Lt. Richard Bassett Wilson, was also killed in the Boer War, at Rustenburg. The third brother, Lt.-Col. Denis Daly Wilson MC, was killed in action in France during the First World War, while the fourth brother, Capt. Sir Frank O'Brien Wilson, was a Royal Navy officer and later a member of the Legislative Council of Kenya.

Educated at Marlborough College, Wilson joined the North Eastern Railway (NER) in 1893, and by 1912 was a director at the company. An officer with the 2nd/5th Battalion of the West Yorkshire Regiment during the First World War, he was elected to parliament at the 1918 general election, which, as the first after the conclusion of the war, was considered a "khaki" election. Wilson, who stood as a Unionist for the Yorkshire constituency of Richmond, was one of the flood of Coalition MPs elected, although he was replacing a fellow Conservative, William Orde-Powlett (later Lord Bolton). He was elected unopposed at the following three general elections, in 1922, 1923, and 1924, but left parliament prior to the 1929 election. His successor, Thomas Dugdale (later Lord Crathorne), held the seat for the next 30 years.

Maintaining his directorship of the NER throughout the war, Wilson continued as a director after the formation of the London and North Eastern Railway (LNER) in 1923. From 1924, he was chairman of the Navy, Army and Air Force Institutes, for which he was knighted in the 1927 Birthday Honours. A Deputy Lieutenant of the North Riding of Yorkshire in later life, he was also a director of the Yorkshire Insurance Company (now part of Aviva), and later sat on the board of the London Electricity Board. Wilson had succeeded his father as lord of Cliffe Hall, and died there in 1946, aged 70. He was described in his obituary in The Times as a "great Yorkshireman, very well known throughout the whole county", and had earlier succeeded the 3rd Baron Grimthorpe as president of the Society of Yorkshiremen in London.

== Family ==
Wilson married in 1904 Sybil May Milbank, a daughter of Sir Powlett Milbank, 2nd Baronet, in 1904, with whom he had four children. She died in 1930, and he remarried in 1934, to Gladys Rhoda Henderson (née MacLean), a widow.

Parliament of the United Kingdom
Preceded by The Hon. William Orde-Powlett	Member of Parliament for Richmond (Yorks); 1918–1929	Succeeded by Thomas Dugdale
