= Sir John Orde, 1st Baronet =

Royal Navy Admiral (1751 –1824)

Admiral Sir John Orde Bt
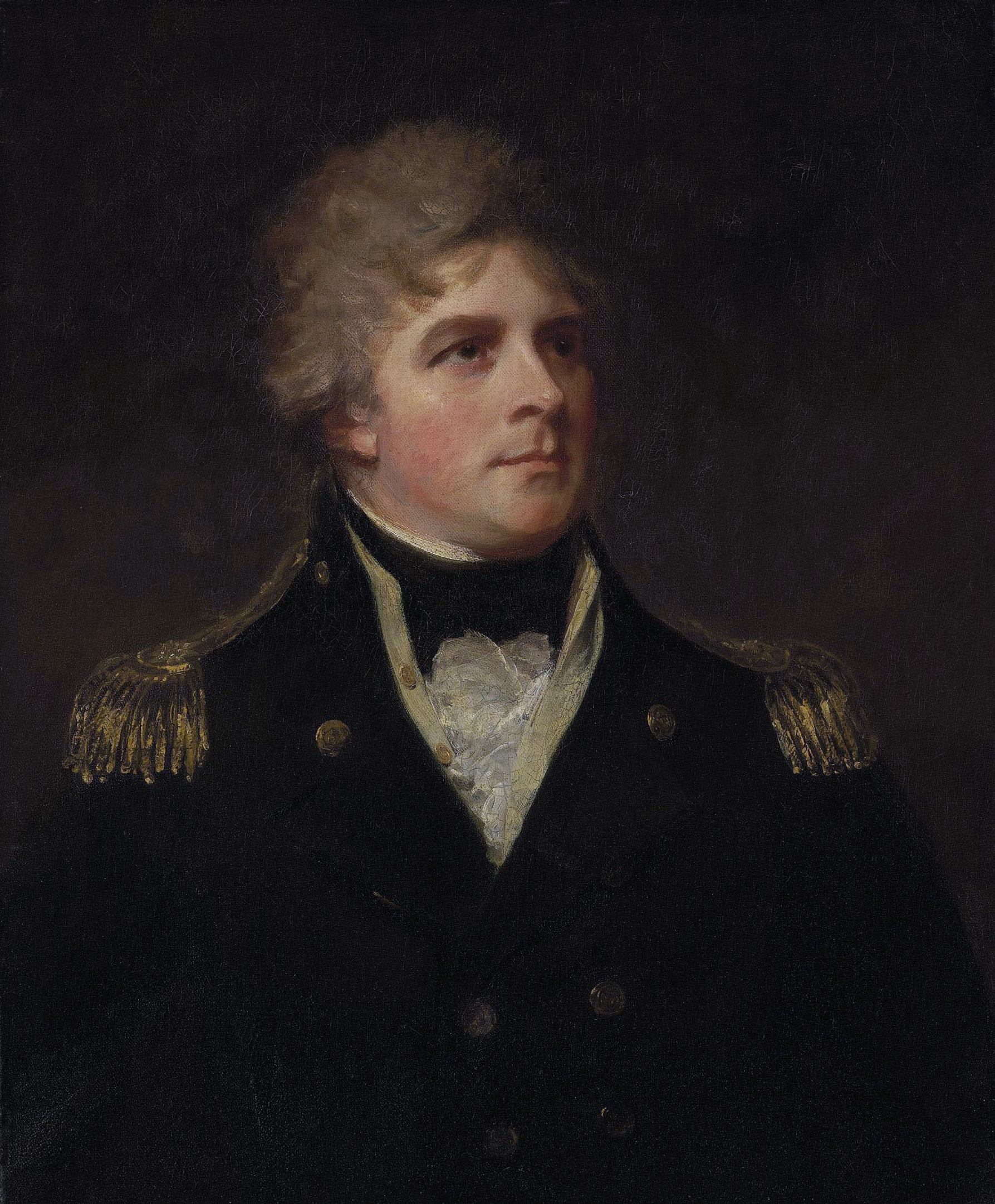
- Portrait of Orde by George Romney
- Born: 22 December 1751
- Died: 19 February 1824 (aged 72)
- Spouses: Margaret Emma Stephens (m. 1781; died 1790) Jane Frere (m. 1793)
- Military career
- Allegiance: Great Britain; United Kingdom
- Branch: Royal Navy
- Service years: 1766–1824
- Rank: Admiral
- Conflicts: American Revolutionary War; Napoleonic Wars
- Other work: Member of Parliament for Yarmouth

Admiral Sir John Orde, 1st Baronet (22 December 1751 – 19 February 1824) was a Royal Navy officer. The third son of John Orde, of Morpeth, Northumberland, and the brother of Thomas Orde-Powlett, 1st Baron Bolton, he is remembered as a professional enemy of Nelson. Orde's quarrel was actually more with Lord St Vincent and he never attacked Nelson personally.

Orde joined the Royal Navy in 1766, gained the rank of rear-admiral in 1795, vice-admiral in 1799 and eventually Admiral of the Red. In 1805, despite being asked to strike his flag, he was made Admiral of the Blue and Admiral of the White in 1810.

As a vice admiral in 1805 he commanded a squadron of six ships of the line off Cádiz, in the flagship HMS Glory.

Orde served as the Governor of Dominica between 1783 and 1793 and was created 1st Baronet Orde, of Morpeth, co. Northumberland on 9 August 1790. From 1807 he served as Member of Parliament for Yarmouth.

== Career ==
=== American Revolutionary War ===
Orde joined the Royal Navy in 1766 and was promoted to lieutenant in 1774. He served throughout the American Revolutionary War (1775–1783), and was promoted to post captain on 19 May 1778, making him senior to Nelson by less than a month. Orde served as Governor of Dominica from 1783 until 1793 and on 9 August 1790 was made a baronet. He returned to naval service and was promoted rear admiral 1795.

=== Relationships with Jervis and Nelson ===
In early 1798, Orde was appointed to the Mediterranean fleet as third in command under John Jervis, 1st Earl of St Vincent. In May 1798, acting on his own initiative but with the support of Lord Spencer, the First Lord of the Admiralty, St Vincent gave command of a special squadron to Nelson. As Nelson's senior, Orde felt he had been unfairly passed over and complained to St Vincent who, annoyed at his subordinate's questioning of his orders, relieved Orde and ordered him home. Orde requested that he be court-martialled in order that he might have the opportunity to clear his name. The Board refused. Orde then requested that St Vincent be brought before a court-martial. Again, the Board refused. The Board did go so far as to censure Jervis for not having supported his subordinates. Orde, unhappy with the outcome, challenged the earl to a duel. The challenge became public knowledge and the king ordered Jervis to decline. Before the challenge was formally declined, however, Orde wrote to the Board to inform them that he had withdrawn it. Neither side came out of the situation well. Had Nelson not won such an extraordinary victory at the Battle of the Nile, Jervis may have faced a court martial for not having supported Orde. Unfortunately for Orde, Nelson's victory was so complete that any criticism of Nelson or Jervis fell on deaf ears. Nelson naturally took Jervis's side and regarded Orde as a personal enemy but Orde maintained that it was the principle of the appointment he objected to, not the person who had been chosen.

Things became worse for Orde when St Vincent was appointed First Lord of the Admiralty. St Vincent now controlled appointments and Orde found himself left ashore. St Vincent left the Admiralty in 1804 and Orde was offered command of a newly formed squadron off Cádiz. This further angered Nelson who saw it as a deliberate diminution of his authority.

=== The Spanish squadron ===
Orde's squadron of six ships of the line were stationed off Cádiz when Villeneuve arrived with the Toulon fleet in April 1805. Orde's ships, which were busy revictualling at the time, cast off their store ships and hastily formed line of battle. Villeneuve however, with his eleven ships of the line and six frigates, made no attempt to engage the squadron. Greatly outnumbered, Orde retired, an act that earned him condemnation from some, Nelson included. Villeneuve gathered the ships that were ready to sail and put to sea again. Orde believed they were bound for the English Channel but in fact Villeneuve was on his way to the West Indies. Orde therefore took his squadron north to rendezvous with the Channel Fleet. Although technically correct, Orde's behaviour was not in accordance with the country's mood at the time and he was ordered to strike his flag. He never served at sea again.

In 1807, Orde became the member of Parliament for Yarmouth, Isle of Wight and served in that capacity until his death on 19 February 1824.

Orde never appeared to reciprocate Nelson's animosity and was one of the pall-bearers at Nelson's funeral in January 1806.

== Family ==
Sir John Orde was married twice, to Margaret Emma Stephens in 1781, who died in 1790; and Jane Frere in 1793, with whom he had two children: John Powlett Orde, born 9 June 1803 and Anna Maria Fenn Orde, born 1806.

Parliament of the United Kingdom
Preceded by Jervoise Clarke Jervoise; William Orde-Powlett	Member of Parliament for Yarmouth; 1807–1812; With: Jervoise Clarke Jervoise 1807–1808; Benjamin Griffinhoofe 1808; John Delgarno 1808; Viscount Valentia 1808–1810; Thomas Myers 1810–1812	Succeeded by Richard Wellesley; Sir Henry Montgomery, Bt
Baronetage of Great Britain
New creation	Baronet (of Morpeth, Northumberland); 1790–1824	Succeeded by John Powlett Orde
