= Roger Scrope, 2nd Baron Scrope of Bolton =

English baron

Roger Scrope, 2nd Baron Scrope of Bolton was a member of the English peerage in the late fourteenth century.

He was the second son of Richard le Scrope, 1st Baron Scrope of Bolton (c. 1327 – 3 December 1403) and Blanche de la Pole (sister of the earl of Suffolk). Roger Scrope's elder brother, his father's heir, had been beheaded for treason by the newly crowned King Henry IV in 1399, making Roger his father's heir.

Roger Scrope was probably born prior to 1370, and was knighted in 1385, while he was deputy governor of Mann. He was married around 1385 to Margaretha Tiptoft (alias de Tibetot) (1366–1431), co-heiress of the Barony of Tibetot.

Roger Scrope died in Bolton on 3 December 1403, only four months after inheriting his title. He was buried in Easby; his will had been written two days previously. His widow married again two years later, but her second husband fled the realm in 1415, having been condemned as a felon.

His heir was his only son, who became Richard Scrope, 3rd Baron Scrope of Bolton.

Peerage of England
Preceded by Richard le Scrope	Baron Scrope of Bolton; 1403	Succeeded by Richard Scrope
