= Cockerington =

Cockerington may refer to the following places in the East Lindsey district of Lincolnshire, England:

- North Cockerington
- South Cockerington
