= John Scrope, 4th Baron Scrope of Masham =

English peer, Privy Councillor and Treasurer of England

John Scrope, 4th Baron Scrope of Masham (c.1388 – 15 November 1455) was an English peer, Privy Councillor and Treasurer of England.

He was the fourth son of Stephen le Scrope, 2nd Baron Scrope of Masham and Margery, daughter of John Welles, 4th Baron Welles. He inherited his title in 1415 when his elder brother Henry Scrope, 3rd Baron Scrope of Masham was executed for his part in the Southampton Plot.

In 1424, he was knighted, made a Privy Councillor and appointed to Commissions of the Peace of Essex, Lincolnshire, Nottinghamshire and Yorkshire. He was on the Council of Regency for the young Henry VI. In 1426, he had the attainder on his title reversed, bought back the Scrope lands confiscated (and granted to other knights in the meantime) following his brother's execution, and was summoned (restored to the Barony) to the House of Lords.

In 1428, he acted as an Ambassador to the Pope, the King of Spain and the Holy Roman Empire, and then to Scotland in 1429. In 1432, he was appointed Lord High Treasurer of England (until 1433). Scrope's tenure as Lord High Treasurer occurred during the Great Bullion Famine and the beginning of the Great Slump in England. He again acted as ambassador, to the Grand Master of the Order of St John of Jerusalem in Rhodes in 1435 and the Archbishop of Cologne in 1439.

He died on 15 November 1455, and was buried in the Scrope Chapel in York Minster. He had married twice; firstly Maud Greystoke, daughter of Sir John Greystoke and secondly Elizabeth Chaworth, the daughter of Sir Thomas Chaworth, of Wiverton, Nottinghamshire, with whom he had three sons and five daughters. he was succeeded by his third son Thomas, later 5th Baron Scrope.

Political offices
Preceded by Walter Hungerford	Lord High Treasurer; 1432–1433	Succeeded by Ralph Cromwell
Peerage of England
Suspended Title last held by Henry Scrope	Baron Scrope of Masham; 1426–1455	Succeeded by Thomas Scrope
