= Henry Scrope, 1st Baron Scrope of Masham =

English soldier and administrator

Henry le Scrope, 1st Baron Scrope of Masham (c. 1312 – 31 July 1392) was an English soldier and administrator.

== Biography ==
Scrope was the eldest son of Geoffrey le Scrope and his first wife, Ivetta. He succeeded his father in 1341.

In early life, Scrope served in the Scottish campaign of 1333 and was knighted at Berwick, where he fought at the Battle of Halidon Hill. He served in Scotland again in 1335 and in 1340 took part in the sea Battle of Sluys at the start of the Hundred Years War. In 1342 he served in Brittany and was present at the sieges of Vannes and Morlaix. He was in Flanders in 1345 and in 1346 fought as a banneret both at the Battle of Crécy and the Battle of Nevilles Cross. In 1347 he was at the siege of Calais and in 1350 in the sea battle off Winchelsea.

In November 1350 Scrope was summoned to the House of Lords as Lord Scrope, later Lord Scrope of Masham and in 1354 he was one of the ambassadors to Pope Innocent VI seeking to arbitrate between England and France.

Scrope served Edward III in Picardy in 1355 and at the siege of Berwick in 1357. In 1357 he was a member of the commission to treat with the Scots for the liberation of David II, king of Scots, and for a truce. In 1359 he served under John of Gaunt in the great chevauchée toward Rheims, and in 1361 he was appointed Warden of Calais and Guînes until 1370. In 1369 he served under John of Gaunt in France; and in 1371 was for a year warden of the western march towards Scotland and also steward of the king's household.

Scrope died on 31 July 1392.

== Family ==
Scrope had married twice; firstly to Agnes and secondly to Joan (both surnames are uncertain). (See Burke's Peerage Reference below) With Joan he had five sons:

- Geoffrey, who went on crusade with Teutonic order and was killed in Prussia in 1362
- William, who fought against the Turks at Satalia in 1361 and died in Mesembria on Black Sea coast in Savoyard crusade.
- Stephen, who likewise went on crusade and who ultimately succeeded him as Stephen Scrope, 2nd Baron Scrope of Masham
- Richard, who became Archbishop of York and was executed in 1405
- John

He had two daughters:

- Joan, who married Hugh FitzHugh, 2nd Baron FitzHugh and had a son, Henry FitzHugh, 3rd Baron FitzHugh
- Isabel, who married Sir Robert Plumpton (1341–1407) of Plumpton
