= Richard Scrope, 3rd Baron Scrope of Bolton =

Richard Scrope, 3rd Baron Scrope of Bolton (31 May 1394 – 29 August 1420) was a member of the fifteenth-century English peerage in Yorkshire.

The only son and heir of Roger Scrope, 2nd Baron Scrope of Bolton (d. 1403), and Margaretha Tiptoft (alias de Tibetot) (1366–1431), co-heiress of the Barony of Tibetot. From the death of his father, Richard Scrope was in the ward of Queen Katherine, who had the keeping of both his estates and also his marriage. This the queen arranged by the end of 1413 to Margaret, daughter of Ralph Neville, 1st Earl of Westmorland (d. 1425) and his first wife Margaret, the daughter of Hugh Stafford, 2nd Earl of Stafford.

Richard Scrope fought in the major theatres of Henry V's French campaign, bringing fifteen men-at-arms and forty-five archers to the Battle of Agincourt and commanding a naval section at the Siege of Harfleur composed of barges and balingers. His last years were spent defending the north-east coast of England against the threat of Scottish sea attacks; in 1418 he was based in Kingston upon Hull with 120 men-at-arms and 240 archers.

He died in Rouen on 29 August 1420; his widow survived until 1463. Following Scrope's death, due to his marriage with a Neville, his estates became the subject of a bitter feud between his executor, Marmaduke Lumley, and Richard Neville, 5th Earl of Salisbury.

Peerage of England
Preceded by Roger Scrope	Baron Scrope of Bolton; 1403–1420	Succeeded by Henry Scrope
