= Henry Scrope, 4th Baron Scrope of Bolton =

Henry Scrope, 4th Baron Scrope of Bolton (1418–1459) was a member of the English peerage in Yorkshire in the 15th century.

Born 4 June 1418 to Richard Scrope, 3rd Baron Scrope of Bolton and Margaret Neville, he was still a minor when his father died in 1420. As such, his lands and marriageability were in the keeping of his uncle Richard Neville, 5th Earl of Salisbury until the young Scrope was 21. He appears to have remained living with his mother, who undertook not to marry him off (being held to a £1,000 bond not to do so). His inheritance was the subject of a brief feud between Richard Neville and Marmaduke Lumley, later Bishop of Carlisle, who had been patronised by Richard Scrope. Lumley's claim was, however, "successfully resisted" by Neville. Henry Scrope received seisin of his estates on 2 February 1439, and two years later he was summoned to parliament as a knight.

== Political and administrative career ==
Much of his career was concerned with administering the royal will in Yorkshire, which was undoubtedly a source of income for him. For example, in the 1440s, the City of York offered him gifts to gain his "friendship". He sat on commissions of the peace in 1448 and 1458; commissioned to collect a subsidy in 1450; and to negotiate with Burgundy over infractions of the truce in 1449. He was even on the Commission of Oyer and terminer in 1453, appointed by the Crown to investigate the violent Percy-Neville feud; this, as historian Ralph A. Griffiths has pointed out, was while he was actually involved in the feud, standing with Salisbury's sons against the House of Percy at the confrontation at Topcliffe, for example. Henry Scrope, in later years, became a supporter of Neville on the West March with Scotland, and was also summoned to the parliament of 1454 during the protectorate of the Duke of York, as part of what has been called a "Neville bloc" supporting the duke. He was again summoned, similarly, to the pro-Yorkist parliament of 1460, and oversaw the appointment of Salisbury's youngest son George as Chancellor.

== Marriage and death ==
Scrope married, around 1435, Elizabeth Scrope (his fifth cousin), who was a daughter of John Scrope, 4th Baron Scrope of Masham. Scrope died on 14 January 1459; his widow survived him until at least 1498. Their children included:

- John Scrope, 5th Baron Scrope of Bolton
- Richard Scrope of Bentley (d. 1485), who married Eleanor Washbourne of Wichenford, and had nine daughters.
- Margaret Scrope (d.1496), who married John Bernard, Lord of the Manor of Abington, Northamptonshire.

Peerage of England
Preceded by Richard Scrope	Baron Scrope of Bolton; 1420–1429	Succeeded by John Scrope
