= Richard Scrope, 1st Baron Scrope of Bolton =

English soldier, courtier and statesman (1327–1403)

Scrope's arms

Richard le Scrope, 1st Baron Scrope of Bolton (c. 1327 – 30 May 1403) was an English soldier and courtier, serving Richard II of England. He also fought under Edward the Black Prince at the Battle of Crecy in 1346.

== Biography ==
Richard le Scrope was a Knight of the Shire for Yorkshire in the parliament of 1364, and was summoned to the upper house as a baron by writ in 1371, when he was made Lord High Treasurer and Keeper of the Great Seal.

In 1378 Lord Scrope became Lord Chancellor, a role in which he attempted to curb the extravagance of Richard II, but resigned in 1380 when the government collapsed due to military failures in France. After the turbulence of the Peasants' revolt, in which his successor was beheaded by the rebels, he took up the position again. He was finally deprived of office by King Richard for non-cooperation in 1382 and thereafter dedicated himself to the rebuilding of Bolton Castle on his estates in Wensleydale in Yorkshire, for which he had been given licence to crenellate.

Both as a soldier and a statesman Lord Scrope was highly regarded and the new king Henry IV was moved to confirm that his lands and titles would not be forfeit in spite of the fact that his eldest son William had been executed by Henry in 1399 for William's support of Richard II. Richard Scrope died on 30 May 1403 in Pishobury, Hertfordshire (where he had bought a country estate) and was buried at Easby Abbey in Richmond, Yorkshire. His title passed to his second son Roger Scrope.

== Heraldic litigant ==
Scrope engaged in several disputes with regard to his armorial bearings, the most celebrated of which was with Sir Robert Grosvenor for the right to the shield blazoned "Azure, a bend Or," which a court of chivalry decided in his favour after a controversy extending over four years (see Scrope v Grosvenor).

Geoffrey Chaucer and Owain Glyndŵr gave evidence in Scrope's favour.

== Family ==
He was a son of Henry le Scrope. Richard le Scrope, Archbishop of York, was a first cousin.

He married Blanche de la Pole (daughter of William de la Pole of Hull), by whom he had four sons:

- William le Scrope, 1st Earl of Wiltshire
- Roger le Scrope, 2nd Baron Scrope of Bolton
- Stephen le Scrope (died 1408)
- Richard le Scrope

== Footnotes ==
Peerage of England
| New title | Baron Scrope of Bolton; 1371–1403 | Succeeded by Roger Scrope |
Political offices
| Preceded by Adam Houghton | Lord Chancellor; 1378–1380 | Succeeded by Simon Sudbury |
| Preceded by William Courtenay | Lord Chancellor; 1381–1382 | Succeeded by Robert Braybrooke |
