= Henry Scrope, 6th Baron Scrope of Bolton =

Henry Scrope, 6th Baron Scrope of Bolton (c. 1468–1506) was the only son and heir of John Scrope, 5th Baron Scrope of Bolton. He inherited his father's lands and title at the age of about thirty, but, unlike his father, was never summoned to parliament in that right. He had married, around 1480, Elizabeth Percy, a daughter of Henry Percy, 3rd Earl of Northumberland, and in 1498 Scrope and his wife were admitted to the City of York's Guild of Corpus Christi.

Dead by 1506, Scrope was buried in Wensley, North Yorkshire; his wife, who was interred alongside him on her death, was still alive in May 1512. Their son was Henry Scrope, who inherited on his father's death.

Peerage of England
Preceded by John Scrope	Baron Scrope of Bolton; 1498–1506	Succeeded by Henry Scrope
