= Henry Scrope, 9th Baron Scrope of Bolton =

English nobleman and soldier

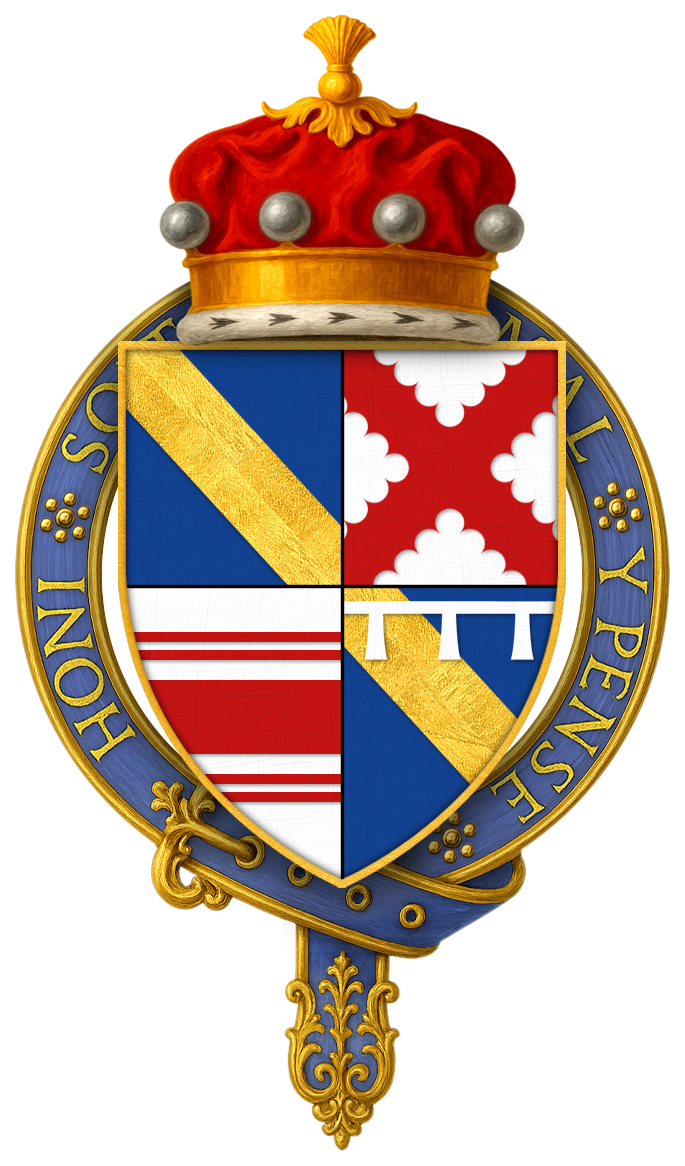
Arms of Sir Henry Scrope, 9th Baron Scrope of Bolton, KG

Henry Scrope, 9th Baron Scrope of Bolton, KG (c. 1534 – 13 June 1592) was the son and heir of John Scrope, 8th Baron Scrope of Bolton and Catherine Clifford, daughter of Henry Clifford, 1st Earl of Cumberland.

== Life ==
Henry Scrope, a loyal supporter of Elizabeth I, was Marshal of the Army during the siege of Leith in 1559 which saw the end of the "Auld Alliance" between Scotland and France. He was appointed Warden of the West Marches and Captain of Carlisle from 1562 until the end of his life.

In April 1568 Mary, Queen of Scots fled across the Solway Firth to England after losing the Battle of Langside. She landed at Workington, travelling from there to Cockermouth and from thence to Carlisle. Scrope was at court at the time, but hurried north with Sir Francis Knollys to take charge of her. After a brief imprisonment in Carlisle Castle, Mary was moved with a large retinue of servants to Lord Scrope's home in Yorkshire, Bolton Castle. Six months later she was moved on to Tutbury Castle.

In 1569, in the abortive Rising of the North, the Catholic Northern Earls rebelled with the objective of releasing Mary, Queen of Scots from her imprisonment at Tutbury and reinstating the old religion with Mary as queen. As Captain of Carlisle Scrope was involved in the suppression of the rising. He was made a Knight of the Garter in 1584.

In September 1589 James VI of Scotland was expecting his wife Anne of Denmark to sail to Scotland. Scrope sent "a brace of verie fatt stagges redy baked" to Edinburgh, and sought out a company of her majesty's players who were in Lancashire to send to Scotland. The bride was delayed and these preparations were wasted. James VI wrote to Scrope on 22 October 1589 outlining arrangements for governance in Scotland while he sailed to Norway, especially as the Scottish border warden Sir John Carmichael was going with him. Scrope wrote to William Asheby, the English ambassador in Scotland, saying he could hardly believe the news that the Scottish king was sailing to Norway.

He died in Carlisle on 13 June 1592 and was succeeded by his eldest son Thomas Scrope, 10th Baron Scrope of Bolton. After his death in 1592, Queen Elizabeth wrote a letter praising his loyal service.

== Family ==
His first wife was Mary, daughter of Edward North, 1st Baron North, who died in 1558. By her, he had a daughter Mary, who married William Bowes of Streatlam.

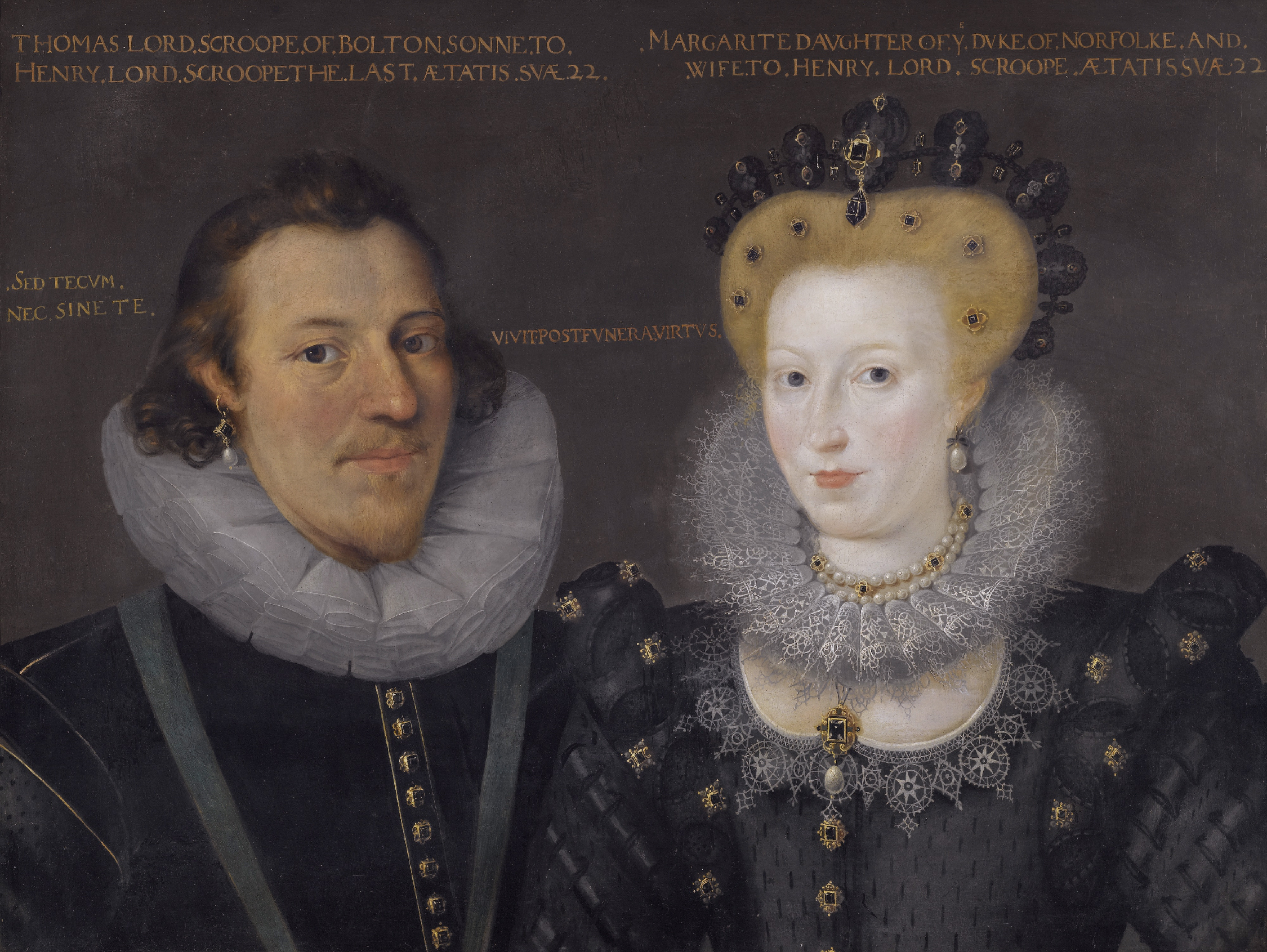
His second wife, Margaret Howard, and their eldest son, Thomas

He married as his second wife Margaret Howard, daughter of Henry Howard, Earl of Surrey and Frances de Vere. They had two sons: the eldest his heir, Thomas and Henry Scrope (died 1625).

== Sources ==
- "Scrope, Henry le (1534-1592)" . Dictionary of National Biography. London: Smith, Elder & Co. 1885–1900.

Peerage of England
Preceded by John Scrope	Baron Scrope of Bolton; 1549–1592	Succeeded by Thomas Scrope
