= Richard Scrope (bishop) =

English archbishop and rebel (c.1350–1405)

Richard le Scrope
- Archbishop of York
- Appointed: between 27 February 1398 and 15 March 1398
- Installed: unknown
- Term ended: 8 June 1405
- Predecessor: Robert Waldby
- Successor: Thomas Langley
- Other post: Bishop of Coventry and Lichfield

Orders
- Consecration: 19 August 1386

Personal details
- Born: c. 1350
- Died: 8 June 1405 (aged c. 55) Clementhorpe, York
- Buried: York Minster
- Denomination: Roman Catholic

Richard le Scrope (c. 1350 – 8 June 1405) was an English cleric who served as Bishop of Coventry and Lichfield and Archbishop of York and was executed in 1405 for his participation in the Northern Rising against King Henry IV.

== Family ==
Richard Scrope, born about 1350, was the third son of Henry Scrope, 1st Baron Scrope of Masham, and his wife, Joan, whose surname is unknown. He had four brothers and two sisters:

- Sir Geoffrey Scrope (c.1342–1362), who married Eleanor Neville, the daughter of Ralph de Neville, 2nd Baron Neville, by Alice, daughter of Hugh de Audley, and was slain at the siege of the Castle of Piskre in Lithuania in 1362, dying without issue.
- Stephen Scrope (c.1345 – 25 January 1406), 2nd Baron Scrope of Masham
- Henry Scrope (1359 – 1425), 4th Lord FitzHugh, 3rd Baron of Ravensworth, who married Lady Elizabeth DeGrey (1365 – 1427)
- Sir John Scrope, who married Elizabeth Strathbogie
- Joan Scrope, who married Henry FitzHugh, 2nd Baron FitzHugh
- Isabel Scrope, who married Sir Robert Plumpton

== Career ==
His father had had a distinguished career as a soldier and administrator, and according to McNiven, Richard's Scrope's first preferments in the church probably owed a great deal to family influence. Scrope was rector of Ainderby Steeple near Northallerton in 1368, warden of the free chapel of Tickhill Castle, and in 1375 official to Thomas Arundel, Bishop of Ely. He was ordained deacon on 20 September 1376, and priest on 14 March 1377. During this time he studied arts at Oxford, and by 1375 became licentiate in civil law. By 1383 he had earned doctorates of canon and civil law at Cambridge, and in 1378 was chancellor of the university.

From 1382 to 1386 Scrope was at Rome, serving as a papal chaplain and an auditor of the Curia. In 1382 he was instituted Dean of Chichester. Although his election as Bishop of Chichester in September 1385 was blocked by King Richard II, Scrope was made Bishop of Coventry and Lichfield on 18 August 1386, and consecrated by Pope Urban VI at Genoa on the following day. Scrope made a profession of obedience to the archbishop of Canterbury on 27 March 1387, and was enthroned in his cathedral on 29 June 1387.

Scrope combined his ecclesiastical duties with involvement in secular matters. In 1378 and 1392 he was sent on diplomatic missions to Scotland, and went to Rome in 1397 to further Richard II's proposal for the canonisation of King Edward II. While in Rome he was translated to York between 27 February 1398 and 15 March 1398, and granted the temporalities on 23 June 1398.

Although he did not participate in the factional strife which led up to King Richard II's deposition, on 29 September 1399 Scrope and John Trevenant, Bishop of Hereford, headed the commission which received the King's "voluntary" abdication at the Tower. Scrope announced the abdication to a quasi-parliamentary assembly on the following day, and together with Thomas Arundel, Archbishop of Canterbury, escorted Henry Bolingbroke to the vacant throne.

== Rebellion ==
As McNiven notes, the dominance of the Percys, Earls of Northumberland, in the north of England, and the family's pivotal role in putting Henry IV on the throne, as well as family alliances (Richard Scrope's elder brother, John Scrope, had married the widow of the Earl of Northumberland's second son, Thomas Percy, and his sister, Isabel Scrope, had married Sir Robert Plumpton, a tenant of the Percys), meant that Richard Scrope, as Archbishop of York, was bound to become involved with the Percys. However his loyalty was untested until the Percys revolted in the summer of 1403. Even then, although the chronicler John Hardyng, a Percy retainer, claimed that Scrope encouraged the Percys to rebel, there is no other evidence that he did so. The Percys suffered defeat at the Battle of Shrewsbury in 1403, at which Northumberland's son and heir, Henry "Hotspur" Percy, was slain.

Richard Scrope continued in his ecclesiastic duties as Archbishop of York. He, assisted by the bishops of Durham and Carlisle Cathedrals, officiated at a solemn translation of Saint John of Bridlington, 11 March 1404, de mandato Domini Papae.

In 1405 Northumberland, joined by Lord Bardolf, again took up arms against the king. The rising was doomed from the start because of Northumberland's failure to capture Ralph Neville, 1st Earl of Westmorland. Scrope, together with Thomas de Mowbray, 4th Earl of Norfolk, and Scrope's nephew, Sir William Plumpton, had assembled a force of some 8000 men on Shipton Moor on 27 May, but instead of giving battle Scrope parleyed with Westmorland, and was tricked (Note: Contemporary writers state that Scrope and his allies were tricked into surrendering by Westmorland; however the later Otterbourne chronicler claimed that they had surrendered voluntarily (see Tait 1894, p. 277) into believing that his demands would be accepted and his personal safety guaranteed. Once their army had disbanded on 29 May, Scrope and Mowbray were arrested and sent to Pontefract Castle to await the king, who arrived at York in early June.

== Trial and death ==
The king denied the rebel leaders trial by jury, and a commission headed by the Earl of Arundel and Sir Thomas Beaufort sat in judgment on the archbishop, Mowbray and Plumpton in Scrope's own hall at his manor of Bishopthorpe, some three miles south of York. The chief justice, Sir William Gascoigne, refused to participate in such irregular proceedings and to pronounce judgment on a Prince of the Church, and it was thus left to the lawyer Sir William Fulthorpe to condemn Scrope to death for high treason. Scrope, Mowbray and Plumpton were taken to a field belonging to the nunnery of Clementhorpe which lay just under the walls of York, and before a great crowd were beheaded on 8 June 1405. Archbishop Scrope requested the executioner to deal him five blows in remembrance of the Five Wounds of Christ, which was a popular devotion in Catholic England. After his execution, Archbishop Richard Scrope was buried in York Minster.

== Legacy ==
Although Scrope's participation in the Percy rebellion of 1405 is usually attributed to his opposition to the king's proposal to temporarily confiscate the clergy's landed wealth, his motive for taking an active military role in the rising continues to puzzle historians.

Pope Innocent VII excommunicated all those involved in Archbishop Scrope's "trial" and execution. However, the archbishop of Canterbury, Thomas Arundel, refused to publish the Pope's decree in England, and in 1407 King Henry IV was pardoned by Pope Gregory XII.

Despite his having been executed for political reasons, Archbishop Scrope was viewed by many in England as a saint and a martyr and tales were told of miracles through his intercession. According to historian Eamon Duffy, pictures of the archbishop are often found in Pre-Reformation English prayerbooks.

=== Shakespeare and Scrope ===
Scrope's parley with Westmorland at Shipton Moor, Westmorland's treachery, and Scrope's arrest after the dispersal of his army are depicted in Act IV of Shakespeare's Henry IV, Part 2. In the play, the king's agents are shown persuading the archbishop and the other rebel leaders to disband their army by promising that their demands will be met and then arresting them for high treason. Every member of their army is then executed without trial. According to historian John Julius Norwich, the actions of the king's agents continue to outrage audiences who watch the play being performed.

Catholic Church titles
Preceded by Walter Skirlaw	Bishop of Coventry and Lichfield; 1386–1398	Succeeded by John Burghill
Preceded by Robert Waldby	Archbishop of York; 1398–1405	Succeeded by Thomas Langley
