= Stephen Scrope, 2nd Baron Scrope of Masham =

Medieval baron in the north of England

Stephen Scrope, 2nd Baron Scrope of Masham and Upsale (1345–1406) was the second surviving son of Henry Scrope, 1st Baron Scrope of Masham and his second wife Joan. Stephen Scrope had a brother, John, and a sister Joan, who married Hugh FitzHugh, 2nd Baron FitzHugh.

== Career ==
His early career was spent both on royal service, fighting in Edward III's French wars, as well as overseeing the activities of the local King's Bench of the West Riding. in and also on pilgrimage in the Middle East. He was knighted in Alexandria in 1365, and fought at the Battle of Nájera, part of England's involvement in the Castilian Civil War, two years later. He inherited his father's estate, which consisted of the manors of Masham, Upsall and Eccleshall and others in Nottinghamshire, in 1391, when he was around forty years old. In 1399 he accompanied Richard II on his expedition to Wales. He was summoned to parliament every year between 1399 and his death in 1406. An antiquarian point of interest has been noted in his having left history one of the few letters left by a fifteenth-century noble written in his own hand: a 1401 document, written whilst Scrope was in the service of Henry of Monmouth. In this letter, Scrope apologises 'for the manner in which it was written; he being obliged, for want of a clerk, to write it himself,' as Dugdale put it.

== Family ==
Stephen Scrope married Margery, daughter of John de Welles, 4th Baron Welles and Maud de Ros, and widow of John de Huntingfield, 1st Baron Huntingfield in about 1376. They had several children. His eldest son Henry inherited the title and was beheaded in 1415 as a result of his involvement in the Southampton Plot against King Henry V. Stephen Scrope's younger son, also named Stephen, became Archdeacon of Richmond in 1400 and Chancellor of University of Cambridge in 1414.

Stephen Scrope died on 25 January 1406 and was buried in the family chapel in York Minster. His wife Margery died in 1422.
