= Bolton Castle =

Castle in North Yorkshire, England

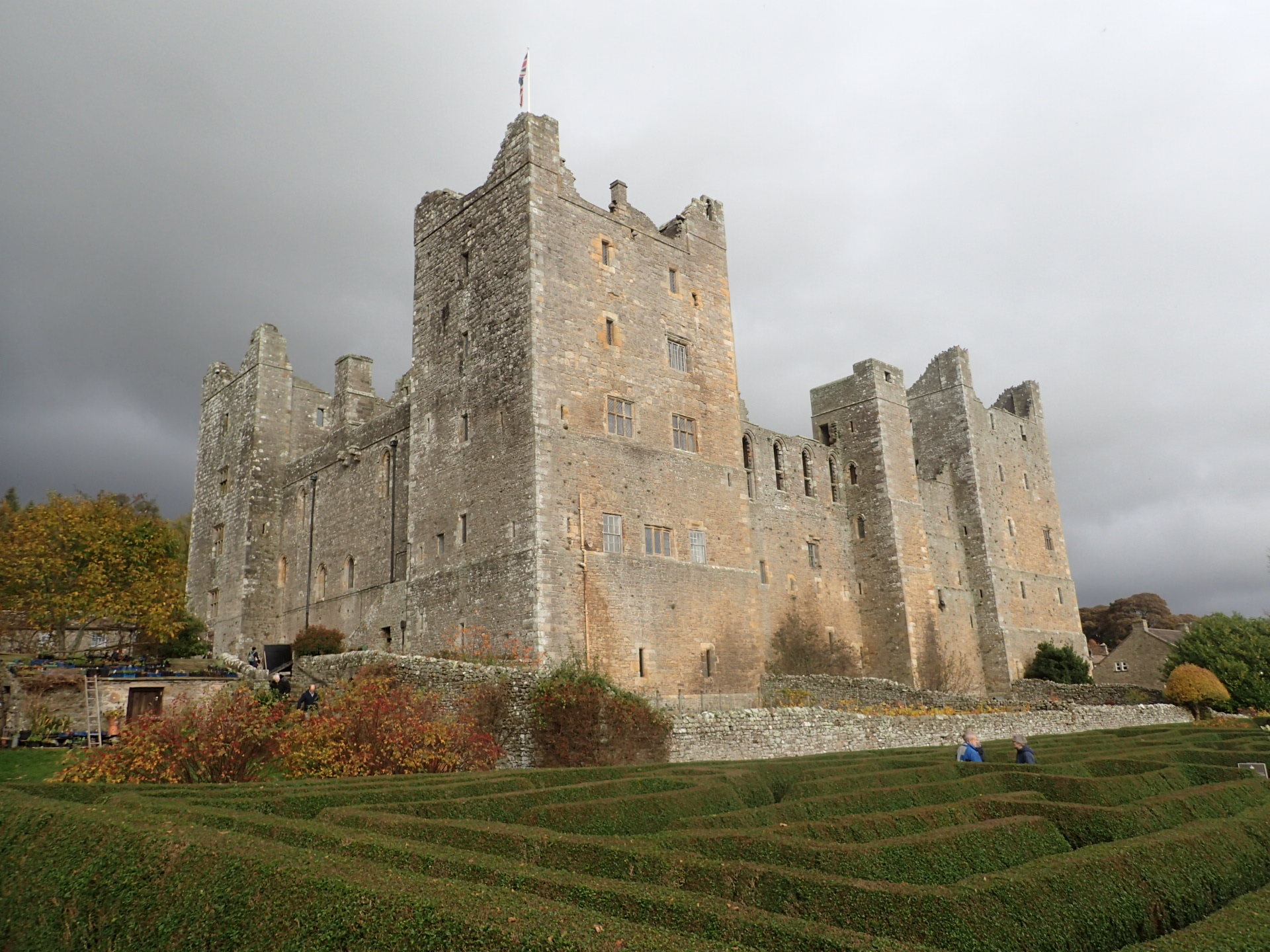
- The castle from the south

- Location within North Yorkshire

General information
- Location: Castle Bolton, Yorkshire, England
- Coordinates: 54.321932°N 1.948106°W
- Construction started: 1378
- Completed: 1399
- Client: Richard, Lord Scrope of Bolton
- Owner: Thomas, Lord Bolton

Design and construction
- Architect: John Lewyn

Website
- www.boltoncastle.co.uk

Listed Building – Grade I
- Designated: 13 February 1967
- Reference no.: 1130885

Bolton Castle is a 14th-century castle located in Wensleydale, Yorkshire, England (grid reference SE03379183). The nearby village of Castle Bolton takes its name from the castle. The castle is a Grade I listed building and a Scheduled Ancient Monument. The castle was damaged in the English Civil War, and “slighted” afterwards, but much of it survived. It has never been sold and is still in the ownership of the descendants of the Scrope family.

== History ==
The castle was built between 1378 and 1399 by Richard, 1st Baron Scrope of Bolton, and is an example of a quadrangular castle. The licence to build it was granted in July 1379 and a contract with the mason John Lewyn was made in September 1378. Construction was reputed to cost 18,000 Marks. The 16th-century writer John Leland described 'An Astronomical Clock' in the courtyard and how smoke was conveyed from the hearth in the hall through tunnels. Bolton Castle was described by Sir Francis Knollys as having 'The highest walls of any house he had seen'.

In 1536 John, 8th Baron Scrope supported the Pilgrimage of Grace rebellion against the religious reforms of King Henry VIII and gave Adam Sedbar, Abbot of Jervaulx sanctuary in the castle. In consequence John Scrope had to flee to Skipton pursued by the King's men but Abbot Sedbar was caught and executed. In retribution the king ordered Bolton Castle to be torched, causing extensive damage. Within a few years, some of the damage had been repaired and Sir John had regained his seat in Parliament.

=== Mary, Queen of Scots ===
Mary, Queen of Scots was held prisoner at Bolton for six months. The story goes that she escaped and made her way towards Leyburn only to lose her 'shawl' on the way, hence the name ('The Shawl') of the cliff edge that runs westward out of Leyburn and is a well-known spot for easy walks with excellent views.

After her defeat in Scotland at the Battle of Langside in 1568 she fled to England, posing a threat to the position of the Protestant Queen Elizabeth I. Mary was initially held at Carlisle Castle under the watch of Henry, 9th Baron Scrope, but Carlisle proved unsuitable and in July 1568 Mary was moved to Bolton. Her primary keeper at this location was Sir Francis Knollys who described the castle, appraising its security;

This howse appeareth to be very strong, very fayre, and very stately after the olde manner of building, and is the highest walled house I have seen, and has but one entrance thereinto.

Mary was given Henry Scrope's own apartments in the South-West tower. Of her retinue of 51 gentlemen, servants and ladies-in-waiting only 30 of her men and six ladies-in-waiting were able to stay in the castle, the rest taking lodgings nearby. Her household included cooks, grooms, her hairdresser (Mary Seton), embroiderer, apothecary, physician, and surgeon. Knollys worried that her goldsmith might counterfeit wax seals for forged letters. Bolton Castle was not initially suitable for housing a Queen, so tapestries, rugs and furniture were borrowed from local houses and nearby Barnard Castle in County Durham. Queen Elizabeth herself loaned some pewter vessels as well as a copper kettle. Mary obtained an "old cloth of estate" from Scotland, which she placed above her chair in the castle's great chamber, making it like a throne room.

Mary's keepers allowed her to wander the surrounding lands and often to go hunting. Her prime occupation while at the castle was having her hair done by her friend Mary Seton. Francis Knollys (the elder), whom Mary nicknamed 'Schoolmaster', taught her English, as she only spoke French, Latin and Scots. Mary wrote a letter to him in English, when she had "never used it afore". She even met with local "Papists" (Catholics), something for which Knollys and Scrope were severely reprimanded. In January 1569, Mary was removed from Bolton Castle for the last time, being taken to Tutbury in Staffordshire where she would spend much of the 18 years before her execution in 1587.

=== Later history ===
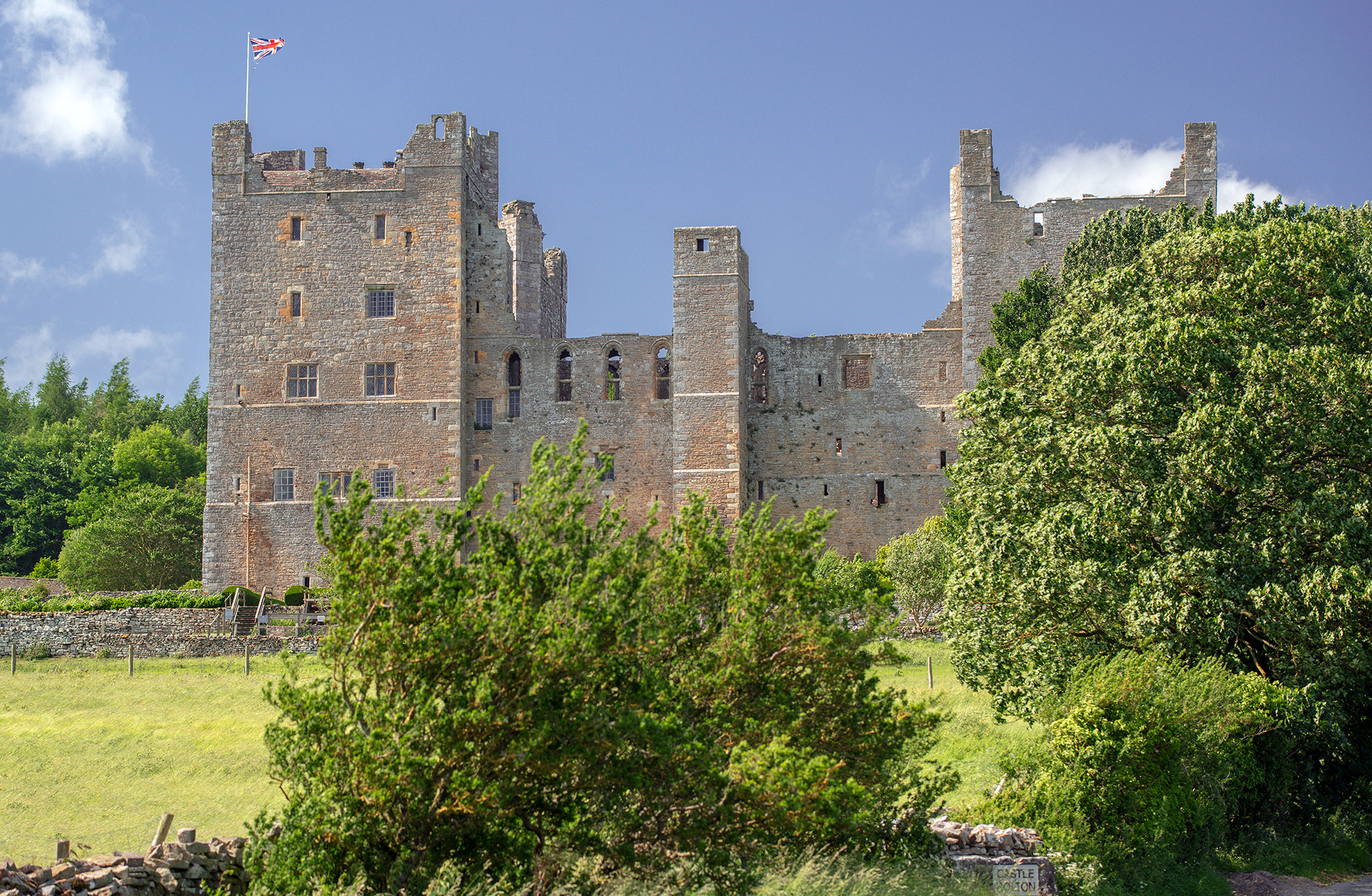
Bolton Castle in June 2018, partially restored

After the death in 1630 of Emanuel Scrope, 1st Earl of Sunderland without any legitimate children, Bolton Castle was inherited by Mary, the eldest of his three illegitimate daughters. She married Charles Powlett, 6th Marquess of Winchester and 1st Duke of Bolton.

The castle is currently owned by their descendant, Thomas Peter Algar Orde-Powlett, 9th Baron Bolton, who inherited on his father's death in June 2023.

There is also a garden including a maze, herb garden, wild flower meadow, rose garden and a vineyard on the site. Falconry displays are staged for visitors during some months. The castle is now a tourist attraction and is also rented out occasionally for events such as weddings. Part of the structure is a ruin but the other section has been restored.

== Film location ==
Several film and television productions have used the castle as a location, including the films Ivanhoe (1952), Elizabeth (1998), Bill (2015), and the television series Heartbeat and All Creatures Great and Small.

== Governance ==
Castle Bolton is the name of the nearby village with a population under 100 in the 2011 Census. Bolton Castle is also the name of an electoral ward. The total population of this ward taken at the 2011 census was 1,269.

== See also ==
- Castles in Great Britain and Ireland
- List of castles in England
- Grade I listed buildings in North Yorkshire (district)
- Listed buildings in Castle Bolton with East and West Bolton
