= John Scrope, 5th Baron Scrope of Bolton =

English nobleman

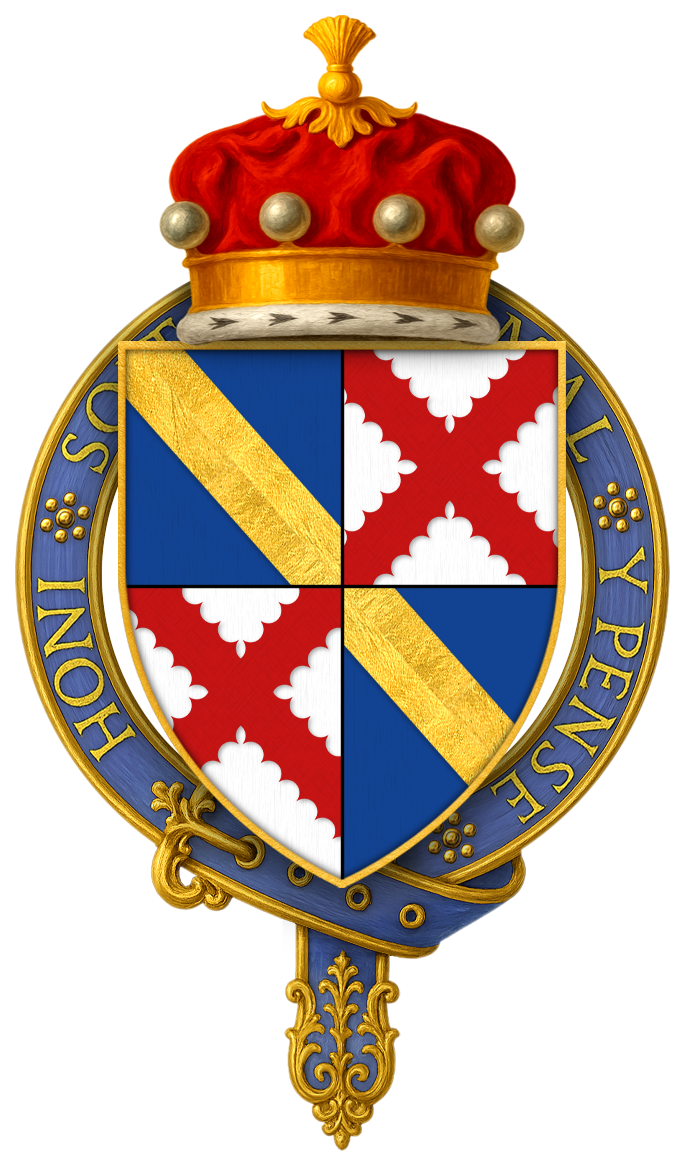
Arms of Sir John Scrope, 5th Baron Scrope of Bolton, KG

John Scrope, 5th Baron Scrope of Bolton, KG (22 July 1437 – 17 August 1498) was an English Yorkist nobleman.

== Early life ==
Born at Bolton Castle, Yorkshire, the eldest son of Henry Scrope, 4th Baron Scrope of Bolton, and Elizabeth Scrope, he inherited his title on the death of his father in 1459.

== Career ==
He was invested as a knight before 1460 while serving as a Commissioner of the Peace for York. As a Yorkist sympathiser, he fought for the Earl of Warwick at the Battle of Northampton and was injured at the Battle of Towton. He was also at the Battle of Hexham. He was invested as a Knight of the Garter by Edward IV in 1463. In 1475 he joined the king with 20 men-at-arms and 200 archers to invade France. In 1482 he led the van of the English army under the Earl of Northumberland when invading Scotland.

He served the crown on a variety of important missions and commissions.

In 1485 he supported the Yorkist Richard III at the Battle of Bosworth but was pardoned by the victor Henry VII, possibly at the intercession of the King's mother, who was the half-sister of his second wife Elizabeth. After the accession of Henry VII, he then supported the Yorkist pretender Lambert Simnel and in 1487, with Thomas, 6th Baron Scrope of Masham, made an unsuccessful attack on Bootham Bar in York, This time he had to pay a heavy fine and remain within the London area. In 1497 he fought against the Scots and assisted in raising the siege of Norham Castle.

On his death in 1498, his title passed to his son and heir, Henry Scrope, 6th Baron Scrope of Bolton. His daughter, Mary Scrope, married William Conyers, 1st Baron Conyers.

== Marriages and issue ==
John Scrope married, firstly in Abt. 1457, Joan FitzHugh, daughter of William FitzHugh, 4th Baron FitzHugh, and Margery Willoughby. Their son and heir was Henry Scrope. His daughter Joan became prioress of Dartford Priory circa 1470.

He married secondly, before 10 December 1471, Elizabeth St John (d. before 3 July 1494), daughter of Sir Oliver St John (d. 1437) and Margaret Beauchamp of Bletso, maternal grandmother of King Henry VII of England. She was the widow of William Zouche, 5th Baron Zouche (died 25 December 1462), of Harringworth.

In 1470, Elizabeth was godmother to the future King Edward V of England. Her loyalty to the House of York was inevitably suspect since she was the half-sister of Lady Margaret Beaufort, who was the mother of the future King Henry VII. John and Elizabeth were proclaimed loyalists to the House of Lancaster, yet John seemed to stick by the Yorkist side. Their daughter, Mary Scrope, became Baroness Conyers, as wife of William Conyers, 1st Baron Conyers.

He married thirdly, after 9 February 1490/91, to Anne Harling, daughter and heir of Sir Robert Harling, and widow of Sir Robert Wingfield, MP.

Peerage of England
Preceded by Henry Scrope	Baron Scrope of Bolton; 14 January 1459 – 17 August 1498	Succeeded by Henry Scrope
