= Leyburn (disambiguation) =

Leyburn may refer to:

== Places ==
- Leyburn, a town in North Yorkshire, England
- Leyburn, Queensland, a town in Australia

== People ==
- George Leyburn (1597–1677), English RC priest
- James Leyburn (1490–1548), of the Westmorland Leyburn family
- James G. Leyburn (1902–1993), American sociologist
- John Leyburn (1615–1702), English RC bishop
- Roger Leyburn (died 1508), English churchman and academic

== Other uses ==
- Leyburn Airfield, Queensland
- Leyburn Old Glebe, nature reserve in North Yorkshire
- Leyburn railway station, North Yorkshire
- Leyburn State School, Queensland
- Leyburn Town Hall, North Yorkshire
- Milners of Leyburn, department store in North Yorkshire

== See also ==
- Leybourne (disambiguation)
