= Bolton Hall, North Yorkshire =

Grade II listed house in North Yorkshire, England

Bolton Hall
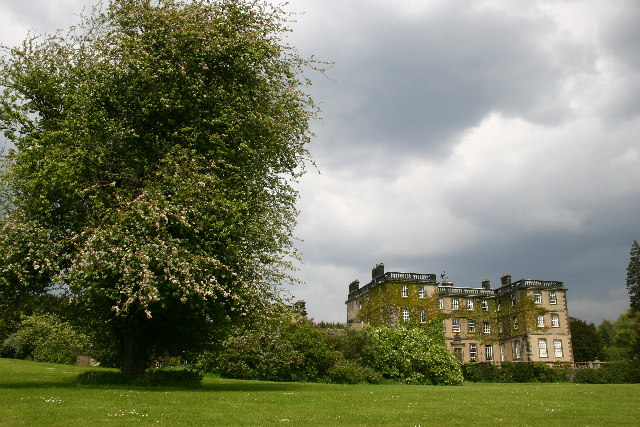
- Interactive map of the Bolton Hall area

General information
- Type: Country house
- Location: Wensley, North Yorkshire
- Current tenants: Barons Bolton
- Client: Charles Paulet, 1st Duke of Bolton
- Location of Bolton Hall in North Yorkshire
- 54.3034°N 1.8857°W

Listed Building – Grade II
- Designated: 13 February 1967
- Reference no.: 1318591

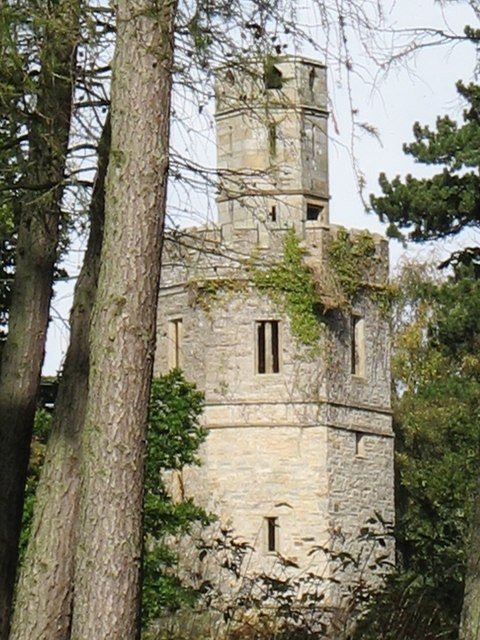
Tower in grounds of Hall

Bolton Hall is a country house near Preston-under-Scar, Richmondshire, North Yorkshire, England, in Wensleydale, some 3 miles (5 km) west of Leyburn. It was built in the late 17th century and rebuilt after a fire in 1902. It is a grade II listed building, as is an 18th-century folly tower in the grounds.

It is built in three storeys of roughcast brick with ashlar dressing and a hipped slate roof. The layout is H-shaped with a central block of 5 bays and an overall frontage of 9 bays. In the 1960s the estate covered 12,000 acres, much of it moorland and woodland, and included Bolton Castle.

== History ==
The Bolton estate belonged to the Scrope family since medieval times, based on Bolton Castle. After the death in 1630 of Emanuel Scrope, 1st Earl of Sunderland and 11th Baron Scrope of Bolton, without any legitimate children, the estate was inherited by Mary, the eldest of his three illegitimate daughters. She married Charles, Marquess of Winchester.

Bolton Hall was originally built in 1678 for the Marquess, who in 1689 was elevated to be the first Duke of Bolton by a grateful King William III for his support in the Glorious Revolution. It passed down through five succeeding Dukes of Bolton to Harry Powlett, 6th Duke of Bolton, an admiral in the Royal Navy. The sixth Duke died without a male heir in 1794 and the dukedom became extinct, the Bolton estates devolving on his brother's natural daughter Jean Browne-Powlett. She married Thomas Orde, who in 1795 assumed the additional surname of Powlett and was a Tory politician. He served as Chief Secretary for Ireland and was ennobled in 1797 as Baron Bolton.

In 1902 the hall suffered a serious fire and was afterwards rebuilt.

The estate then passed down to Harry Algar Nigel Orde-Powlett, 8th Baron Bolton, who inherited on his father's death. The 8th Baron resided at Bolton Hall, which was originally built in 1675. His residence in 2016 was Wensley Hall, Wensley, Leyburn. He died 10 June 2023. He has been succeeded by his son Thomas Orde-Powlett as the 9th Baron.

== See also ==
- Listed buildings in Preston-under-Scar
- Bay Bolton, seven times champion sire horse.
- Bolton Castle
- The Mount, North Yorkshire
