= Wensleydale (disambiguation) =

Wensleydale is a valley or dale in the Yorkshire Dales, England.

Wensleydale may also refer to:

- Wensleydale cheese, a style of cheese originally produced in Wensleydale, North Yorkshire
- Wensleydale (sheep), a sheep breed
- Wensleydale Railway, a railway line running through Wensleydale, England
- Baron Wensleydale (disambiguation), two baronies
- The Wensleydale School, a coeducational school in North Yorkshire, England
- Wensleydale, Victoria, a locality in Australia
  - Wensleydale railway line (Australia), a line which served Wensleydale, Victoria between 1890 and 1948
- President Wensley Dale, a fictional character in the British TV series Rastamouse
