= St Peter and St Paul's Church, Leyburn =

Church in Leyburn, North Yorkshire, England

Coordinates: 54°18′43″N 1°49′45″W

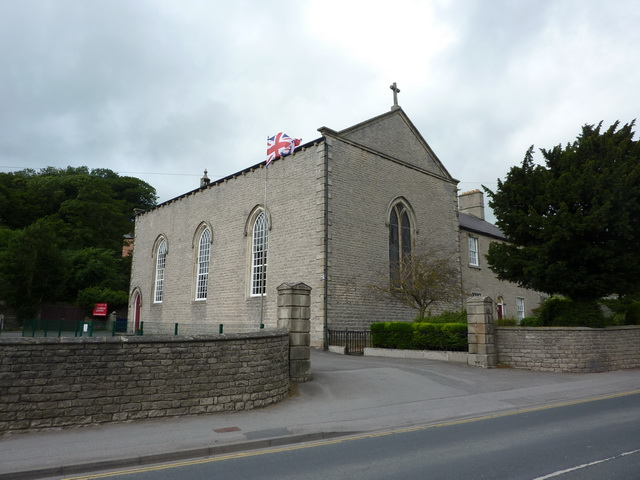
The church, in 2010

St Peter and St Paul's Church is a Catholic church in Leyburn, a town in North Yorkshire, in England.

The church and adjoining presbytery and stable with schoolroom above were built in 1835 by Chapleo and Sons. The work cost about £2,000, and the building is in the Gothick style. The school closed in the early 1870s, although a new Catholic school was built just to the south in 1895. The sanctuary was reordered in the late 20th century, and the east window was restored in 2010. The church and presbytery were separately grade II listed in 1986, and the church was upgraded to grade II* in 2016.

The church is built of sandstone on a plinth, with limestone dressings, rusticated quoins, an eaves string course, and a stone slate roof. The southeast gable has moulded coping and a Latin cross, and the other gable has a bellcote and a ball finial. The doorway and the windows have chamfered surrounds, round-arched heads and hood moulds, and the windows have Y-tracery. Inside the church are box pews and a west gallery.

The presbytery is built of limestone with sandstone dressings, quoins, and a Welsh slate roof with a coped gable. It has two storeys and three bays, and a rear extension. The central doorway has a semicircular fanlight, and is set in a round-headed arch with imposts and a keystone. At the rear of the presbytery is the former stable and schoolroom containing a basket-arched cart opening. External steps lead up to the schoolroom. The boundary is enclosed by stone walls, and the entrance drive to the church has cast iron railings and a gate.

== See also ==
- Grade II* listed churches in North Yorkshire (district)
- Listed buildings in Leyburn
