= Harmby =

Village and civil parish in North Yorkshire, England

Coordinates: 54.30163°N 1.80454°W

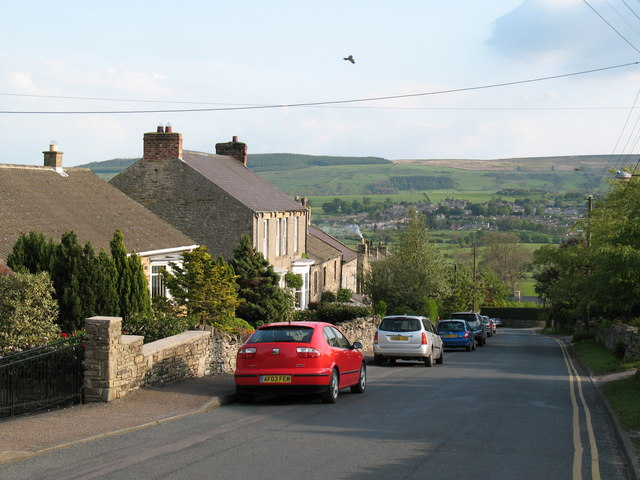
- Harmby village street

- Location within North Yorkshire
- Population: 371 (2011 Census)
- OS grid reference: SE128895
- Unitary authority: North Yorkshire
- Ceremonial county: North Yorkshire
- Region: Yorkshire and the Humber
- Country: England
- Sovereign state: United Kingdom
- Post town: Leyburn
- Postcode district: DL8
- Dialling code: 01969
- Police: North Yorkshire
- Fire: North Yorkshire
- Ambulance: Yorkshire

Harmby is a village and civil parish in Lower Wensleydale, one mile south-east of Leyburn, in North Yorkshire, England. It is located roughly three miles east of the Yorkshire Dales National Park. Harmby has close links with Spennithorne, a village half a mile to the south-east. The two villages have a joint sports association.

The name Harmby derives from the Old Norse Hjarnibȳ meaning 'Hjarni's village'.

Harmby Waterfall, over which Harmby Beck flows, is located in a wooded gorge on the east side of the village. It can be accessed via two footpaths from the main road, near the top of Harmby Bank, across from the Pheasant Inn. The beck is crossed by a footbridge just downstream of the falls. Harmby Beck meets Spennithorne Beck before flowing into the River Ure.

Edward Baines, in his 1823 directory, lists the village as Harnby and gives the population as 194. In 2011, the population of Harmby was 371.

This small community has few businesses; the largest are the Pheasant Inn and the Lower Wensleydale Caravan and Motorhome Club Site (caravan park).

Harmby has a village hall, behind which are the grounds used by the sports association.

The A684, between Kendal and Ellerbeck, runs past the village. Harmby is served by one public bus route, the 155, operated by Hodgsons Coaches. There is another bus service that operates for schoolchildren attending Spennithorne School or Wensleydale School.

The village was historically in the North Riding of Yorkshire, and from 1974 was part of the Richmondshire district in the newly-established county of North Yorkshire. Until 2023 it was governed by North Yorkshire County Council and Richmondshire District Council; in 2023, North Yorkshire Council restructured into a unitary authority, abolishing the district councils.

Harmby lies in the constituency of Richmond and Northallerton. The member of parliament is Rishi Sunak.

== See also ==
- Listed buildings in Harmby
