= George Humble =

George Humble may refer to:

- Sir George Humble, 3rd Baronet (c. 1670–1703) of the Humble baronets
- George Humble, candidate for Carleton
- George Bland Humble (1839–1930), Australian town clerk and educator
