= St Matthew's Church, Leyburn =

Coordinates: 54°18′32.6″N 1°49′36.4″W

Church of St Matthew
- The Parish Church of St Matthew, Leyburn
- St Matthew's
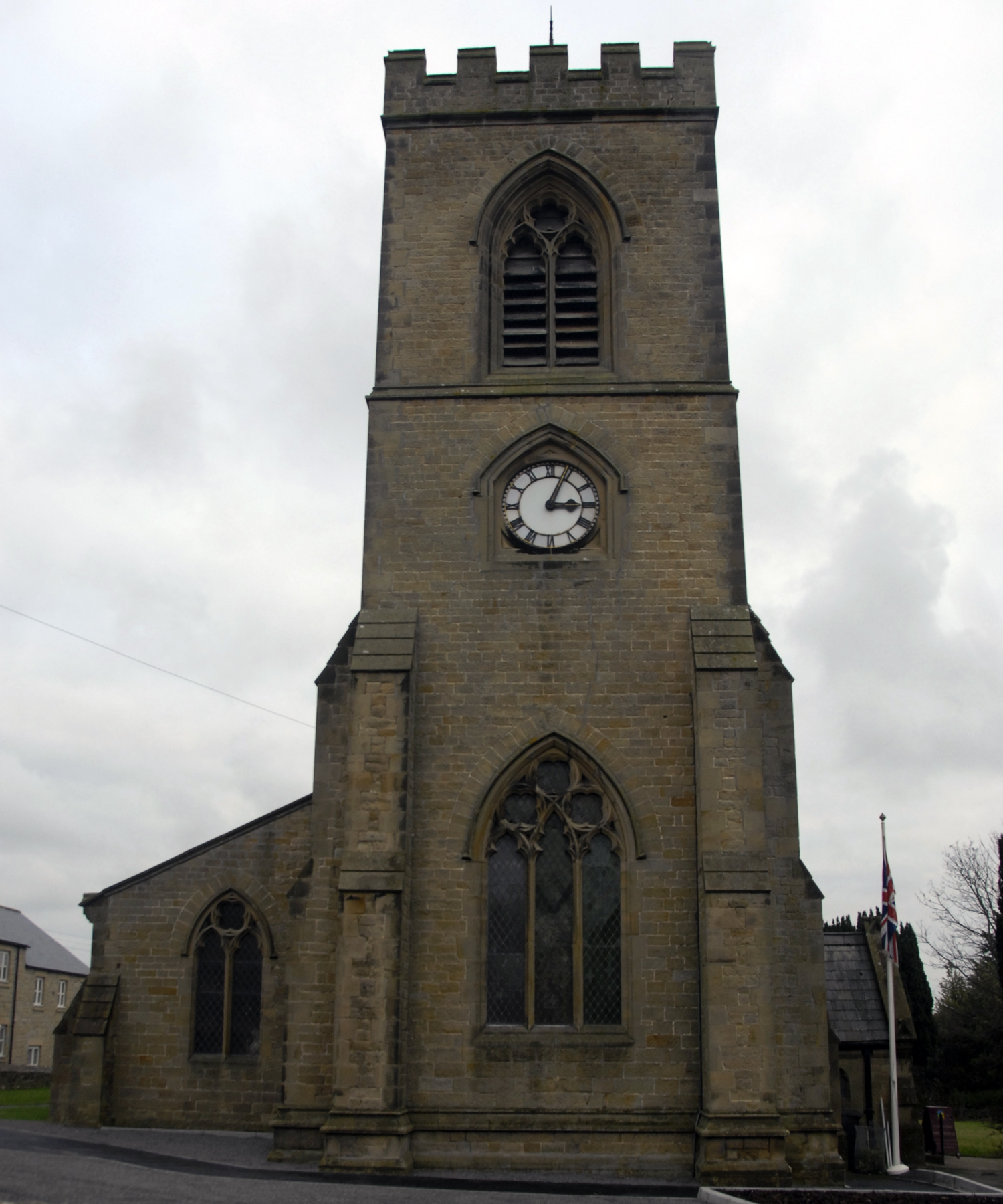
- The Church of St Matthew Leyburn

- The Church of St Matthew Leyburn in North Yorkshire
- OS grid reference: SE113903
- Location: Leyburn, North Yorkshire
- Country: England
- Denomination: Church of England

History
- Consecrated: 16 September 1868

Architecture
- Functional status: Active
- Architect: Christoper George Wray
- Architectural type: Geometrical
- Construction cost: £3,000 (1868)

Administration
- Diocese: Leeds
- Archdeaconry: Richmond & Craven
- Deanery: Wensley
- Parish: Leyburn

Clergy
- Vicar: Stephen Hanscombe

Listed Building – Grade II
- Designated: 13 February 1967
- Reference no.: 1318565

The church of St Matthew Leyburn (also known as The Parish Church of St Matthew, Leyburn) is the parish church for Leyburn in North Yorkshire, England. It is just to the south-east of Leyburn town centre and on the northern side of the A684 road. The parish is relatively new (being raised in 1956) and the church itself was built in 1868 after many years of parishioners having to travel to nearby Wensley (1-mile (1.6 km) to the west) to worship.

In 2017, permission was granted to allow the parish to remove the pews and enhance car parking around the site, despite some objections to the overall plan. The church celebrated its 150-year anniversary in 2018.

== History ==
Up until the 16th century, a church had been in existence at Leyburn at a site to the west of town known as Chapel Flatts. When the country converted from Catholicism during the Reformation, the church was downgraded from a place of worship and then converted into a barn. It was later left to ruin and the stones were re-used by local people for houses and walls in the area; as a result, the structure had been completely demolished by the early 1800s. During this time, parishioners were expected to go to services at Holy Trinity Church in Wensley; as a consequence, Leyburn still had a market but no church, which was rare.

Historically, Wensley was the settlement of greater importance and had possessed a market since 1202 (Leyburn's was not granted until the 16th century), hence the reason for the main church. After a plague hit Wensley in 1563, most of the survivors left and reduced Wensley to a very small village with a large church.

In 1836, a temporary structure was built in Leyburn and this became a daughter church of Holy Trinity Wensley. In 1868, when the church of St Matthew was consecrated, the church still functioned as a chapel of ease to Holy Trinity until 1956 when Leyburn was separated into its own ecclesiastical parish. The records up until 1956 are still combined with the records from the Church of the Holy Trinity in Wensley.

The Church of St Matthew lies to the north of the A684 road on the eastern side of Leyburn, and was built on land donated by Lord Bolton. It is the only church designed by Christopher George Wray, and has been described as being in a Geometrical style (Note: It has also been described as being in the decorated Gothic style.) with a tower on the west side. The tower displays the only public clock in Leyburn town. The building of the church cost £3,000 and was paid for by public subscription, although the original intent was for a much larger building, but funding was insufficient. A stipulation of the works was that no burials were permitted in the churchyard, and despite one former churchwarden being buried there in 1955, this has been adhered to. (Note: The cemetery at Leyburn is just west of the town on the A684 road going towards Wensley.)

The church is constructed of sandstone and has a hammerbeam roof which is topped off with Welsh slate. The Chancel is 22 feet (6.7 m) by 17 feet (5.2 m), the nave is 48 feet (15 m) by 21 feet (6.4 m) with an 11-foot (3.4 m) aisle and a three-story west facing tower that is 10 feet (3.0 m) square.

Apart from some work on the clerestory of the Church of St Anne, Catterick, Wray did not design any other Christian religious buildings, but he did design other notable structures such as The Maritime Museum in Hull and the Palace Hotel in Cairo. The church was consecrated in September 1868 by Bishop Robert Bickersteth but the organ was not completed until May 1870. The building was grade II listed in 1967.

There is a plaque on the west wall commemorating Flight Lieutenant Alan Broadley, a Richmondshire born Royal Air Force navigator who was killed on Operation Jericho, the military raid on Amiens Prison in February 1944.

In 2016, a £36,000 grant from the Listed Places of Worship Roof Repair Fund, meant that the drainage and associated works on the roof could be carried out. In the same year, plans were announced to remove the pews from the church and install a new glass corridor to an external annexe as part of an upgrade and to make it into a community hub. Despite some public objections, the works received approval from Richmondshire District Council in 2016 and from the Diocese of Leeds in early 2017.

In 2018, the church celebrated its 150-year anniversary.

== See also ==
- Listed buildings in Leyburn
