= Ernie Gillatt =

English footballer

Personal information
- Full name: Kenneth Ernest Gillatt
- Place of birth: Wensley, Leyburn, Yorkshire, England
- Position: Inside forward

Senior career*
Years	Team	Apps	(Gls)
1920–1923	Clapton Orient	61	(6)
1923–1924	Burnley	1	(0)
1924	Mansfield Town	?	(?)
1924–1926	Barnsley	13	(1)
- * Club domestic league appearances and goals

Kenneth Ernest "Ernie" Gillatt was an English professional association footballer who played as an inside forward during the 1920s.
