= Sandpiper Inn =

Pub in Leyburn, North Yorkshire, England

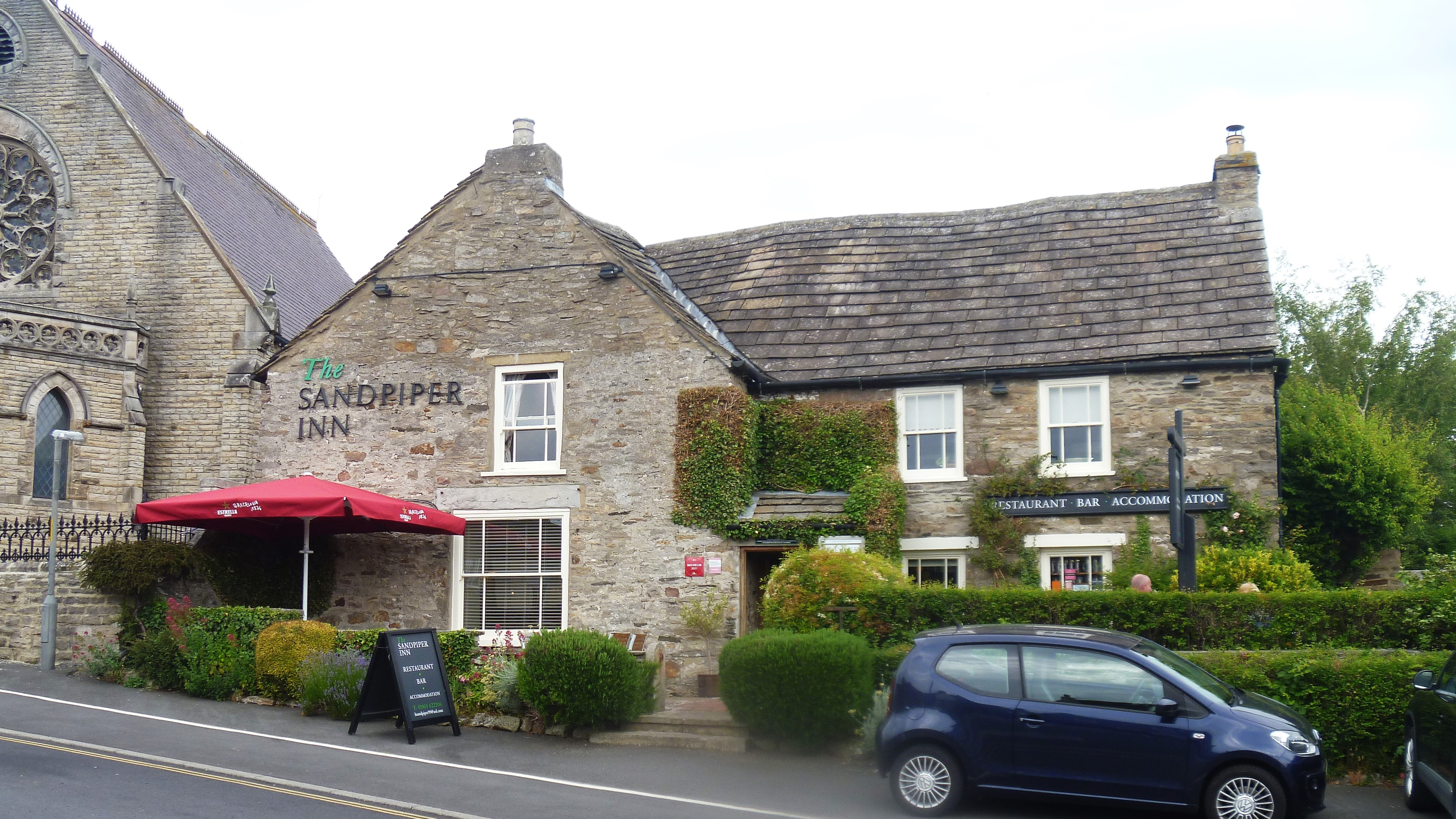
The pub, in 2022

The Sandpiper Inn is a historic pub in Leyburn, a town in North Yorkshire in England.

The inn was built in the late 17th century. The building was grade II listed in 1986. In 1999, it was purchased by the chef Jonathan Harrison, who trained under Alain Ducasse.

The pub is built of stone with a stone slate roof. There are two storeys, a range of two bays, and a gabled projecting cross-wing on the left. In the angle is a porch, and the windows are sashes with margin lights. Inside, some beams and the roof truss are visible.

== See also ==
- Listed buildings in Leyburn
