= Gargrave (surname) =

Gargrave is a surname. Notable people with the name include:

- Anthony Gargrave (1926–1998), English-born logger, lawyer and political figure in British Columbia
- Cotton Gargrave (1540–1588), English landowner and politician who sat in the House of Commons
- George Gargrave (1710–1785), English mathematician
- Herbert Gargrave (1905–1973), English-born painter and decorator and political figure in British Columbia
- Mary Gargrave (d. 1640) English courtier
- Richard Gargrave (1575–1638) was an English landowner and politician in the House of Commons
- Thomas Gargrave (1495–1579), English Knight who served as High Sheriff of Yorkshire
- Thomas Gargrave (soldier) (died 1428), English Knight

== See also ==
- Gargrave, village and civil parish in North Yorkshire, England
