= Listed buildings in Harmby =

Harmby is a civil parish in the county of North Yorkshire, England. It contains two listed buildings that are recorded in the National Heritage List for England. Both the listed buildings are designated at Grade II, the lowest of the three grades, which is applied to "buildings of national importance and special interest". The parish contains the village of Harmby and the surrounding area, and the listed buildings consist of a house and a set of limekilns.

== Buildings ==
Name and location	Photograph	Date	Notes
Manor House; 54.30246°N 1.80681°W	—	19th century	The house, which incorporates 13th-century material, is in stone, with quoins, and a stone slate roof with stone coping. There are two storeys and four bays. The doorway has a quoined surround, and the windows are top-hung casements, most with flat-arched lintels of stone voussoirs.
Limekilns; 54.30722°N 1.80845°W		1856	The disused limekilns are in stone, and consist of three pairs of limekilns built into a hillside. Each opening is a semicircular arch of voussoirs, and the interior of each has a square plan with three hearths of small round arches in pale brick. On the front is a dated and initialled plaque, and on the top are projecting cast iron beams and two small turrets.
