= St Margaret's Church, Preston-under-Scar =

Church in Preston-under-Scar, North Yorkshire, England

Coordinates: 54°18′56″N 1°53′34″W

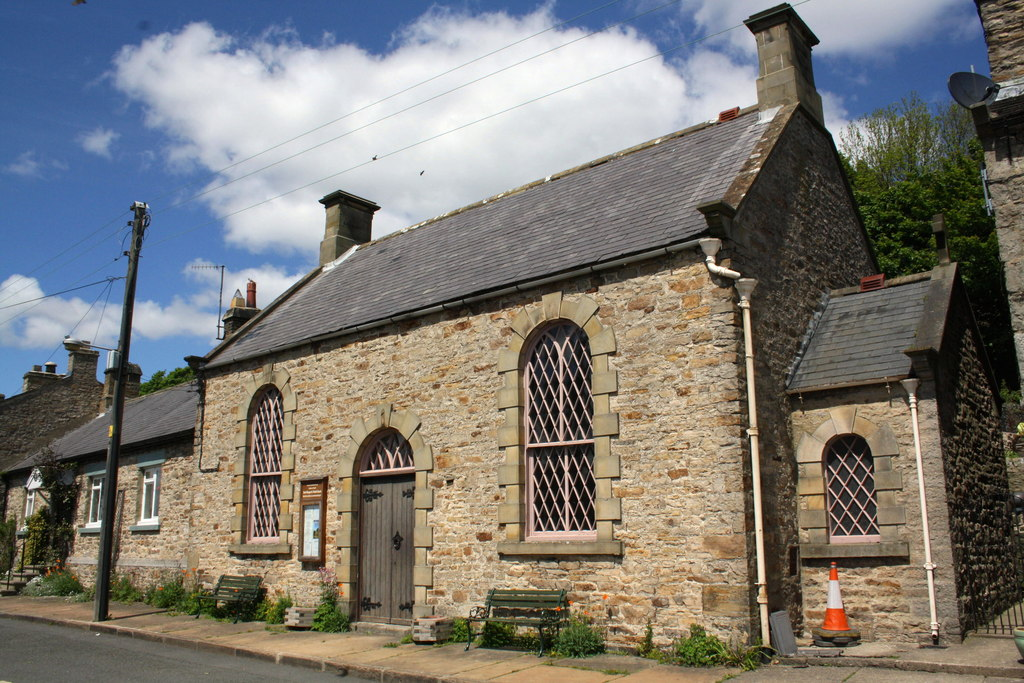
The church, in 2013

St Margaret's Church is a parish church in Preston-under-Scar, a village in North Yorkshire, in England.

Preston-under-Scar was in the parish of Holy Trinity Church, Wensley. In 1862, a mission room was built in the village. The church in Wensley was declared redundant in about 2006, and St Margaret's then became the parish church. The church has been grade II listed since 1986. In 2025, the church raised more than £20,000 to restore its bellcote, vestry and north window.

The church is built of stone and has a Welsh slate roof with stone copings and shaped kneelers. The church consists of a nave, a small chancel with a vestry and a bellcote above, and an outbuilding at the rear. In the centre is a doorway with a fanlight, and it is flanked by windows; all have round-arched heads and quoined surrounds, the fanlight and windows containing Y-tracery. Inside, there is an octagonal portable font in the Perpendicular Gothic style, and a mural by Muriel Metcalfe.

== See also ==
- Listed buildings in Preston-under-Scar
