= Thornborough Hall =

Building in Leyburn, North Yorkshire, England

Coordinates: 54°18′42″N 1°49′56″W

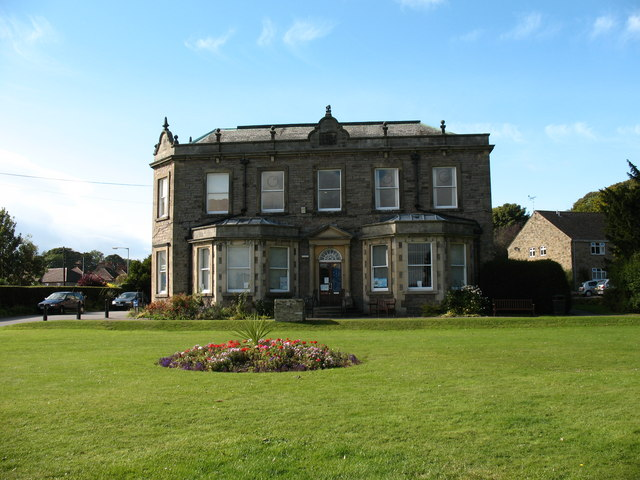
The building, in 2007

Thornborough Hall is a historic building in Leyburn, a town in North Yorkshire, in England.

The house was built in the mid 18th century, perhaps as early as 1720, and was originally known as "Leyburn Grove". It was partly rebuilt and given a new front in 1863, the new design being by Joseph Hansom. In the 20th century, it was sold to Richmondshire District Council, and was converted to house a council chamber, magistrates' court, register office and council offices. In 2001, it was purchased by Leyburn Town Council to use as its headquarters, maintaining the register office and adding the town library and further offices.

The three-storey building is constructed of stone, and is Jacobean style at the front, while the original Georgian style is visible at the rear. There are several folly buildings in the grounds, including Leyburn Sham Castle.
