= Keld Heads Mine =

Lead mine in Preston-under-Scar, North Yorkshire, England

Coordinates: 54.3125°N 1.8792°W

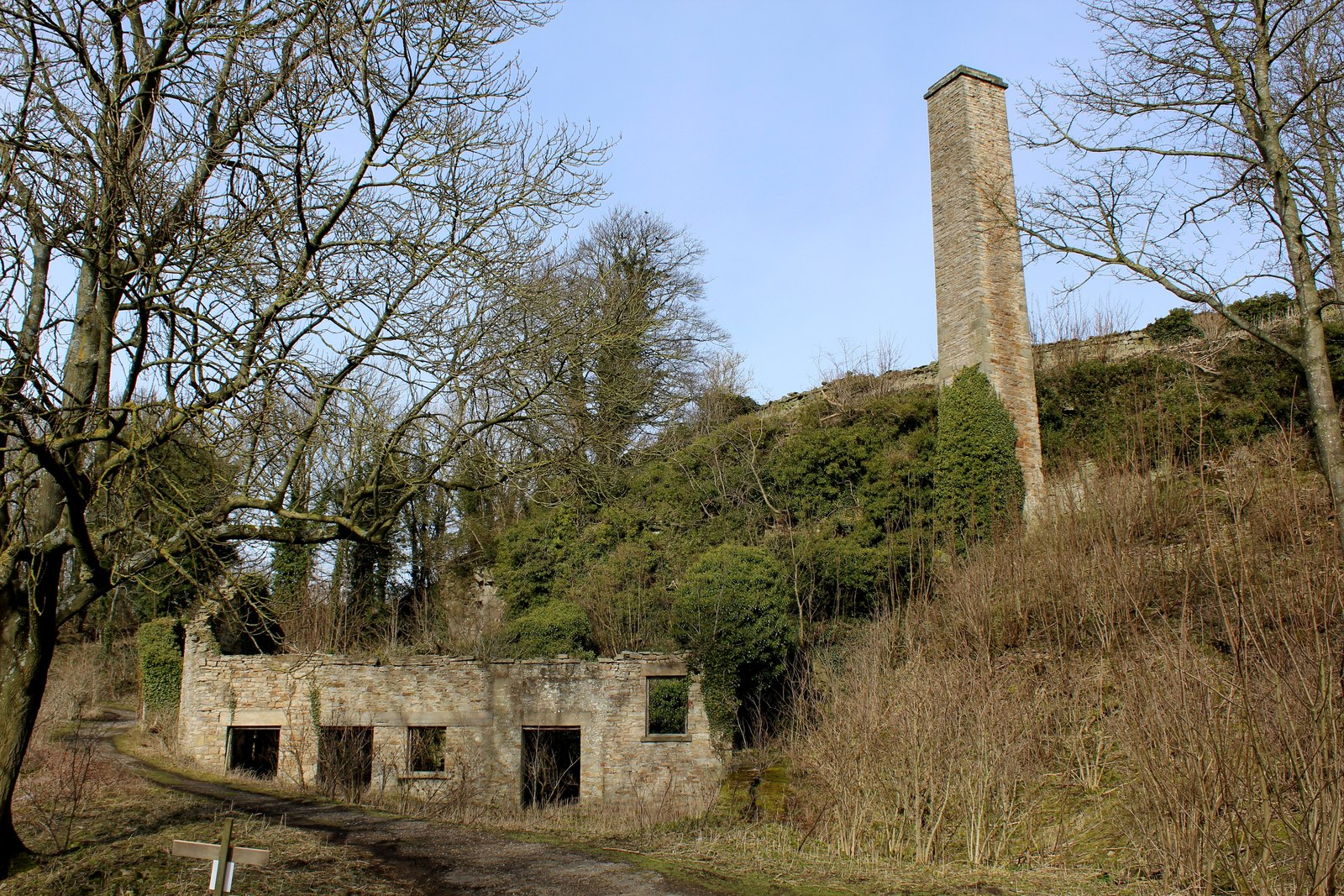
Ruins of the pumping house

Keld Heads Mine is a closed lead mine in Preston-under-Scar, a village in North Yorkshire, in England.

Lead is first recorded as having been mined at Keld Heads in the 12th century. By 1823, the mine was nearing exhaustion, but several long adits were dug into the hillside, greatly increasing production. In 1851, a smelt mill was constructed, replacing the need to transport ore to Preston Mill. Local farmers were concerned about pollution from its fumes, leading to its flue being extended to reach 3.3 kilometres (2.1 miles), joining up with the flue of Cobscar Mill. Silver was also refined at the site. The mine owners installed updated equipment later in the century, and it was regarded as the most advanced lead mine in the country. However, it appears that the mill closed in about 1884 after the price of smelted lead fell, and flooding in the lower levels of the mine increased pumping costs, leading to the closure of the entire complex in 1888. The mine buildings were then converted for the use of a nearby quarry, with the chimney serving a coal-fired electricity generating plant. The mine is a scheduled monument, while the main complex of buildings and the peat store are separately grade II listed.

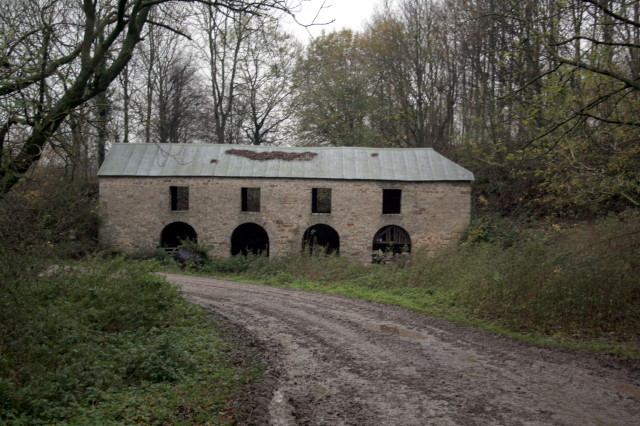
The peat store

The mine buildings are built of stone and are now derelict. They include a chimney with a square plan, about 12 metres (39 ft) in height, with a circular hole at the base and a cornice at the top. There is a large pumping house with round-arched openings, and an adjacent stable and stores building with a timber roof structure.

The former peat store is built of stone with quoins and a corrugated sheet roof. It has two storeys and four bays. On the ground floor are four cart openings with semicircular arches and voussoirs, and the upper floor contains plain openings.

== See also ==
- Listed buildings in Preston-under-Scar
