= Leyburn Sham Castle =

Building in Leyburn, North Yorkshire, England

Coordinates: 54°18′45″N 1°49′57″W

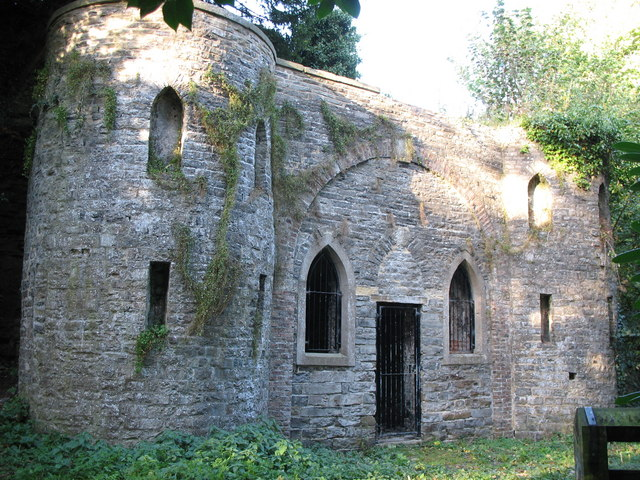
The building, in 2009

Leyburn Sham Castle is a historic structure in Leyburn, a town in North Yorkshire, in England.

The folly lies in the grounds of Thornborough Hall, north of the house. It was built in about 1790, in the Gothic style, for Ralph and Molly Riddell. It is purely decorative, being very narrow against the hillside behind, and each of the two storeys can only be accessed from the hillside. Barbara Jones described as "one of the prettiest and most peaceful little sham castles in England". It was restored in the 1990s, and was grade II listed in 1998.

The structure is built of stone and brick, and in the form of a square keep, with circular towers at each corner, and an octagonal turret. On the front is a round-headed brick arch with a keystone. The central doorway has a flat head under a pointed arch, and the windows have pointed heads. The towers have arrow slits, and windows with pointed heads above.

== See also ==
- Listed buildings in Leyburn
