= Leyburn Town Hall =

Municipal building in Leyburn, North Yorkshire, England

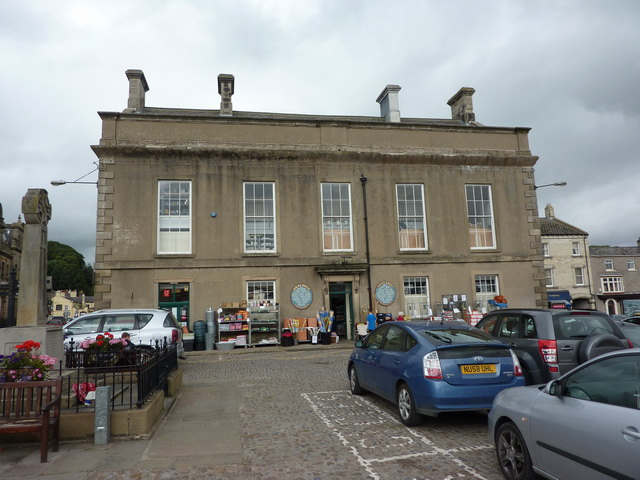
- Leyburn Town Hall

- Shown in North Yorkshire
- 54.3101°N 1.8302°W
- Location: Market Place, Leyburn

History
- Built: 1857

Site notes
- Architectural style: Neoclassical style

Listed Building – Grade II
- Official name: Town Hall
- Designated: 24 January 1986
- Reference no.: 1178994

Leyburn Town Hall is a municipal building in the Market Place, Leyburn, North Yorkshire, England. The structure, which is used for retail purposes and as an events venue, is a grade II listed building.

== History ==
The first municipal building in Leyburn was a tollbooth in the Market Place; it was primarily used for the collection of market rents and dated back to the grant of a charter for a fortnightly fair by King Charles II to the lord of the manor, the 6th Marquess of Winchester, in 1684. By the mid-19th century the tollbooth had become somewhat antiquated, and the then lord of the manor, the 3rd Lord Bolton of Bolton Castle, decided to rebuild the structure.

Construction work on the new building started in 1856. It was designed in the neoclassical style, built in ashlar stone at a cost of £2,000 and was completed in 1857. The design involved a symmetrical main frontage with five bays facing onto the Market Place; the central bay featured a doorway flanked by brackets supporting a cornice. The other bays on the ground floor and all the bays on the first floor were fenestrated by sash windows and, at roof level, there was a deep parapet. Internally, the principal rooms were the assembly room on the first floor, which was used for petty session hearings, and the magistrates' office; there were also two flats, each with a living room and a bedroom.

In the late 19th century, large social events were regularly held in the assembly hall; such events included a series of annual balls organised by the local company of the 1st Volunteer Battalion, the Yorkshire Regiment in the late 1880s. A memorial in the form of a celtic cross, commissioned to commemorate the lives of local service personnel who had died in the First World War, was erected outside the town hall in 1920 and, during the Second World War, the 11th Battalion of the North Riding Home Guard established a shooting range inside the building.

Although the ground floor was converted to retail use and was occupied by a local homewares business, Wray & Co., in the 1970s, the assembly room continued to be made available for community events: the Wensleydale School held a debate, which was attended by the future Chancellor of the Exchequer, Rishi Sunak, there in September 2018.

== See also ==
- Listed buildings in Leyburn
