= Listed buildings in Preston-under-Scar =

Preston-under-Scar is a civil parish in the county of North Yorkshire, England. It contains 13 listed buildings that are recorded in the National Heritage List for England. All the listed buildings are designated at Grade II, the lowest of the three grades, which is applied to "buildings of national importance and special interest". The parish contains the village of Preston-under-Scar and the surrounding countryside. In the parish is the country house Bolton Hall, which is listed together with associated structures, and the other listed buildings include houses, a former mill, a bridge, buildings surviving from a former lead mine, a church and a boundary stone.

== Buildings ==
| Name and location | Photograph | Date | Notes |
|---|---|---|---|
| Manor House; 54.31482°N 1.89288°W | — | 16th century (possible) | The house, which is much altered, is in stone on a boulder plinth, with quoins, and a stone slate roof with stone coping and kneelers. There are two storeys and a T-shaped plan, with two bays, a projecting cross-wing, and a rear outshut. The main front contains a doorway and mullioned and transomed windows. On the cross-wing is a mullioned window and a casement window, and, projecting from it, is a large chimney breast incorporating a mask corbel. |
| Bolton Hall; 54.30346°N 1.88571°W | | Late 17th century | A country house extensively damaged by fire in 1902 and rebuilt by 1904. It is in roughcast brick on a plinth, with stone dressings, chamfered rusticated quoins, floor bands, a cornice, a balustraded parapet, and hipped Welsh slate roofs. There are three storeys and a basement, with a central block of five bays, flanking projecting two-bay wings, and further ranges to the west. In the centre is a doorway in an architrave with a pulvinated frieze and a cornice, above which is a coat of arms. The windows are sashes in architraves. At the rear is a central doorway with an architrave, an embellished frieze, and consoles carrying a broken segmental pediment with a cherub mask keystone. |
| Dial House; 54.31576°N 1.89445°W | — | Late 17th century | The house is in stone, and has a stone slate roof with shaped kneelers and stone copings. There are two storeys and three bays. The doorway is in the centre, and above it is a sundial and a casement window. The outer bays contain sash windows, and in the right bay is a fire window. |
| The Tower, Bolton Hall; 54.30430°N 1.88346°W | | Late 18th century | A folly to the northeast of the house, it is in stone and has a hexagonal plan. There are three storeys with paired bands between, a cornice, an embattled parapet and a smaller turret. On the north side is a doorway in an architrave, above are vents with chamfered surrounds, and in the turret are vents and five-sided openings in its parapet. |
| Preston Mill; 54.31261°N 1.88100°W | | 1784 | A mill house and watermill converted for residential use, at right angles to each other. They are in stone and have stone copings and shaped kneelers, one dated. Each part has three storeys and three bays. The house also has a rear wing, and contains a doorway, one horizontally sliding sash window, and the other windows are casements. The former mill has a two-story extension to the front, and contains sash windows. |
| Stable courtyard, Bolton Hall; 54.30389°N 1.88686°W | — | Early 19th century | The buildings in the stable courtyard are in stone with stone slate roofs. They have two storeys, and form three ranges about a courtyard, with a main range of nine bays, and three-bay wings at right angles. The coach house in the main range has three four-centred arched openings with voussoirs, and elsewhere in the range are doorways, sash windows, and two Diocletian windows. In the courtyard are stables, dog kennels, and a cast iron pump. The front wall is in stone and coped, and in the centre are two stone gate piers with ball finials. |
| Hellgill Bridge; 54.30184°N 1.87702°W | | Early 19th century | The bridge carries a road over a stream. It is in stone, and consists of a single segmental arch of voussoirs. The bridge has a parapet with pedestals and a balustrade. |
| Farm buildings adjoining stable courtyard, Bolton Hall; 54.30388°N 1.88751°W | — | Early to mid-19th century | The farm buildings are in stone with stone slate roofs. They have one or two storeys, and form ranges around two courtyards. The buildings include a barn, cart sheds, one with a hay loft above, stables and ancillary buildings. |
| Keld Heads Lead Mine Buildings; 54.31168°N 1.87869°W | | Mid-19th century | The mine buildings are in stone and derelict. They include a chimney with a square plan, about 12 metres (39 ft) in height, with a circular hole at the base and a cornice at the top. There is a large engine house with round-arched openings, and an adjacent stable and stores building with a timber roof structure. |
| Peat store, Keld Heads Lead Mine; 54.31434°N 1.88174°W | | Mid-19th century | The peat store, later used for other purposes, is in stone with quoins and a corrugated sheet roof. There are two storeys and four bays. On the ground floor are four cart openings with semicircular arches and voussoirs, and the upper floor contains plain openings. |
| St Margaret's Church; 54.31547°N 1.89274°W | | 1862 | The church originated as a mission room. It is in stone and has a Welsh slate roof with stone copings and shaped kneelers. The church consists of a nave, a small chancel with a vestry and a bellcote above, and an outbuilding at the rear. In the centre is a doorway with a fanlight, and it is flanked by windows; all have round-arched heads and quoined surrounds, the fanlight and windows containing Y-tracery. |
| Robin Cross Boundary stone 54.35317°N 1.89525°W | | 1866 | The boundary stone is roughly shaped, and about 1 metre (3 ft 3 in) in height. There are inscriptions on the east and south faces. |
| Stables near Hell Gill; 54.30646°N 1.87953°W | — | Late 19th century | The three stable buildings are in stone, and have conical stone slate roofs with finials. Each has a circular plan and one storey, and the outer stables also have a detached outer wall with a south gateway. To the south, each has a doorway with a stone surround and imposts, flanked by two small windows. |
