= Listed buildings in Leyburn =

Leyburn is a civil parish in the county of North Yorkshire, England. It contains 35 listed buildings that are recorded in the National Heritage List for England. Of these, two are listed at Grade II*, the middle of the three grades, and the others are at Grade II, the lowest grade. The parish contains the market town of Leyburn and the surrounding countryside. Most of the listed buildings are houses and associated structures, and shops. The others include public houses and hotels, a farmhouse, a field barn, a folly, a former bank, a boundary stone, churches and a presbytery, a drinking fountain, a former watermill, former railway sheds, a town hall and a war memorial.

== Key ==
| Grade | Criteria |
|---|---|
| II* | Particularly important buildings of more than special interest |
| II | Buildings of national importance and special interest |

== Buildings ==
| Name and location | Photograph | Date | Notes | Grade |
|---|---|---|---|---|
| The Sandpiper Inn; 54.30949°N 1.82773°W | | Late 17th century | The public house is in stone with a stone slate roof. There are two storeys, a range of two bays, and a gabled projecting cross-wing on the left. In the angle is a porch, and the windows are sashes with margin lights. | II |
| The Grove; 54.31121°N 1.83161°W | — | 1740 | The house is in stone, with a moulded cornice, and a stone slate roof with stone copings and a dated kneeler. There are two storeys, four bays and a rear wing. The doorway has a moulded surround, a fanlight, a pulvinated frieze and a cornice. The windows are sashes in moulded surrounds, and in the left return is a canted bay window. | II |
| Sanderson and Co; 54.31049°N 1.83015°W | | 1746 | A house, later a shop, it is roughcast, and has a stone slate roof with a shaped kneeler and stone coping on the left. There are two storeys and three bays. In the centre is a doorway with a moulded surround, a pulvinated frieze, and a pediment containing initials and the date. This is flanked by shop windows, and in the upper floor is a fixed fire window on the left, and two sash windows to the right. | II |
| Leyburn Hall; 54.30976°N 1.83173°W | | c. 1750 | A large house, it is roughcast, and has stone dressings, a stone slate roof, two storeys and an E-shaped plan. The south front has a central five-bay block on a plinth, with rusticated quoins, a string course, a moulded cornice, and a blind parapet. The windows are sashes with moulded surrounds, the central ground floor window with an eared architrave and a cornice on consoles. The block is flanked by single-bay links containing openings with quoined surrounds. At the ends are pedimented pavilions with quoins, each containing a full-height round-arched opening with a moulded surround, and containing a tripartite window with Doric half-columns, and a Diocletian window above. On the top is a wrought iron weathervane. The north front has seven bays, a central Doric portico, and Venetian windows. | II* |
| 4 and 5 Grove Square; 54.31133°N 1.83039°W | — | Mid 18th century | A house and a cottage that have a Westmorland slate roof with stone copings. There are two storeys and three bays. On the front are two doorways, one with a moulded surround, and the windows are sashes in plain surrounds. | II |
| Golden Lion Hotel and railings 54.30995°N 1.82885°W | | 18th century | The hotel is in stone, with rusticated quoins, and a stone slate roof with shaped kneelers and stone copings. There are three storeys and four bays. In the second bay is a doorway with a frieze, a blocking course and a cornice. To the right is a two-storey canted bay window, the outer bays each contains a single-story canted bay window, and the other windows are sashes. In front of the building is a low stone wall with saddleback coping, and cast iron railings with fleurs-de-lis finials. | II |
| High Side Farmhouse; 54.31435°N 1.81211°W | | 18th century | The farmhouse is in stone, with quoins, and a stone slater roof with shaped kneelers. There are two storeys, three bays, and a continuous rear outshut. The central doorway has a stone surround with impost jambs. The windows are sashes, those on the front under flat arches with voussoirs. | II |
| Gate piers and wall northeast of Leyburn Hall; 54.30997°N 1.83125°W | — | 18th century | The gate piers and walls are in sandstone. The piers are rusticated, and each pier has a base, a cornice, and a base for a ball finial. The walls are coped and curving, and end in piers. | II |
| Gate piers northwest of Leyburn Hall; 54.30999°N 1.83193°W | — | 18th century | The gate piers are in sandstone and rusticated. Each pier has a base, a cornice, and a ball finial. | II |
| Gate piers northeast of Trevor House; 54.31135°N 1.82922°W | — | Mid 18th century | The gate piers are in stone on stands. Each pier has alternate projecting courses, a cornice and an oval ball finial. | II |
| Grove Hotel; 54.31135°N 1.83085°W | — | 1757 | A house, later used as a hotel, in roughcast stone, that has an artificial slate roof with shaped kneelers and stone copings. There are two storeys and two bays. The central doorway has a moulded surround and a dated and initialled frieze and a cornice. The windows are sashes in moulded surrounds. | II |
| The Gothick Folly; 54.31246°N 1.83257°W | | c. 1790 | The folly is in the grounds of Thornborough Hall to the north of the house. It is in stone and brick, and in the form of a square keep, with circular towers at each corner, and an octagonal turret. On the front is a round-headed brick arch with a keystone. The central doorway has a flat head under a pointed arch, and the windows have pointed heads. The towers have arrow slits, and windows with pointed heads above. | II |
| Bolton Arms Hotel; 54.30975°N 1.83106°W | | Late 18th to early 19th century | The hotel is in stone on a plinth, with quoins and a stone slate roof. There are three storeys, three bays, and a rear wing. The central doorway has a fanlight, a fluted surround and a small pediment, and above it is a coat of arms with a columned and pedimented surround. The windows in the outer bays of the lower two floors are tripartite sashes, and in the top floor are three sash windows. On the left return is a two-storey segmental bay. | II |
| Field barn 54.31282°N 1.83903°W | | Late 18th to early 19th century | The barn has been adapted as an eye-catcher or folly. It is in stone with quoins and a stone slate roof. The gables are crow-stepped, with an additional merlon added to each step to give an embattled appearance. On the sides are round-arched openings, some blocked, and some just recesses, and a square-headed window. | II |
| 25 Market Place; 54.30999°N 1.82906°W | — | Early 19th century | A pair of shops on a corner site in stone with a stone slate roof. There are three storeys and three bays. In the centre are two doorways, to theirs left is a plate glass shop window with consoles, and to the right is a 20th-century shop window. In the upper floors, the outer bays contain sash windows, the windows in the middle bay are blind, and all the windows and doorways have flat arches of stone voussoirs. | II |
| 27 Market Place; 54.31002°N 1.82917°W | — | Early 19th century | A house, at one time s shop, in stone with a stone slate roof. There are three storeys and three bays. In the centre is a doorway, and this is flanked by canted bay windows. In the upper floors, the outer bays contain sash windows, the windows in the middle bay are blind, and all the windows and the doorway have flat arches of stone voussoirs. | II |
| Former Barclays Bank; 54.30954°N 1.82977°W | | Early 19th century | The former bank is in stone, with sill bands and a Westmorland slate roof. There are three storeys and four bays. In the fourth bay is a flat-arched carriage entrance. The second bay contains a round-arched doorway with a fanlight, imposts, a moulded arch, and a fluted keystone. This is flanked by tripartite sash windows, and in the upper floors are sash windows with stone lintels. | II |
| Black Swan Hotel; 54.31010°N 1.82937°W | | Early 19th century | The hotel is in stone with a stone slate roof. There are three storeys and four bays. In the second bay is a doorway with a Classical surround, and it is flanked by canted bay windows. The fourth bay contains a doorway with a plain surround, and the windows in the upper floors are sashes with flat arches of stone voussoirs. | II |
| Boundary stone 54.30522°N 1.85131°W | | Early 19th century | The boundary stone is on the southeast side of the A684 road. It has a semicircular head and is about 500 millimetres (20 in) high. On the front is a badly weathered inscription. | II |
| Clyde House; 54.30923°N 1.82824°W | | Early 19th century | The house is roughcast, and has a stone slate roof. There are two storeys and three bays. The central doorway has a round-arched fanlight with radial glazing, imposts and a keystone. The windows are sashes with wedge lintels. | II |
| Lowood House; 54.30960°N 1.83059°W | | Early 19th century | A house, later used for other purposes, in painted stone with a stone slate roof. There are two storeys and three bays. The central doorway has a fanlight and a slab canopy, and the windows are sashes. | II |
| Former Premises of Messrs. Jones; 54.30955°N 1.82989°W | | Early 19th century | A shop in stone with sill bands and a pantile roof. There are three storeys and two bays. In the ground floor is a doorway with a fanlight,and a bay window to the left. The upper floors contain sash windows with flat arches of stone voussoirs. | II |
| Premises of C Milner and Sons; 54.30956°N 1.83003°W | | Early 19th century | A shop in painted stone with sill bands and a stone slate roof. There are three storeys and two bays. In the ground floor is a shop door and windows, and the upper floors contain sash windows with flat arches of stone voussoirs. | II |
| Premises of Messrs Tennants; 54.31004°N 1.82927°W | — | Early 19th century | A shop in stone with a stone slate roof. There are three storeys and one bay. In the ground floor is a doorway, and to the right is a shop window with consoles. The upper floors contain sash windows. | II |
| Prospect House; 54.30957°N 1.83037°W | | Early 19th century | A shop in stone, with sill bands, and a stone slate roof with stone copings. There are three storeys and three bays. In the ground floor is a central door flanked by shopfronts, and the upper floors contain sash windows; the middle window in the middle floor is blind. | II |
| Trevor House; 54.31127°N 1.82945°W | — | Early 19th century | A house and cottage in stone, with quoins, and a tile roof with stone coping and shaped kneelers. There are two storeys and four bays. The round-arched doorway has a fanlight and a keystone. The windows are sashes. | II |
| Westend House; 54.31147°N 1.83400°W | — | Early 19th century | The house is rendered, and has a stone slate roof with shaped kneelers and stone copings. There are two storeys and three bays. On the front is a doorway with a stone surround and a keystone containing a sundial. The windows are sashes; those in the left bay in both floors are tripartite. | II |
| St Peter and St Paul's Church; 54.31191°N 1.82903°W | | 1835 | The church is in sandstone on a plinth, with limestone dressings, rusticated quoins, an eaves string course, and a stone slate roof. The southeast gable has moulded coping and a Latin cross, and the other gable has a bellcote and a ball finial. The doorway and the windows have chamfered surrounds, round-arched heads and hood moulds, and the windows have Y-tracery. Inside the church are box pews and a west gallery. | II* |
| Presbytery, school room, outbuildings, walls and railings 54.31198°N 1.82886°W | — | 1835 | The presbytery is in limestone with sandstone dressings, quoins, and a Welsh slate roof with a coped gable. There are two storeys and three bays, and a rear extension. The central doorway has a semicircular fanlight, and is set in a round-headed arch with imposts and a keystone. At the rear of the presbytery is a stable and schoolroom containing a basket-arched cart opening. External steps lead up to the schoolroom. The boundary is enclosed by stone walls, and the entrance drive to the church has cast iron railings and a gate. | II |
| Drinking fountain 54.31005°N 1.82998°W | | Mid 19th century | The drinking fountain is in cast iron, it is cylindrical, and about 1 metre (3 ft 3 in) high. It consists of a fluted shaft on a base, with a lion's mask originally containing spouts, and a hemispherical cap with an acorn finial. Projecting from the fountain is a rest for water containers. | II |
| Walk Mill; 54.30325°N 1.81521°W | | 19th century | A corn watermill, later converted for residential use, in stone with a stone slate roof. There are two storeys, one bay, and a projecting wing on the left. The entrance is in the upper flor at the rear, and the windows are horizontally-sliding sashes. | II |
| Two coal depot sheds, Leyburn railway station 54.30804°N 1.82186°W | | 1854 | The sheds, which have since been converted to be used for other purposes, are in stone with quoins, and slate roofs with stone coped gables. On the south front, each shed has a segmental-arched cart opening and sash windows. In the east front is a large single round-headed engine entrance, and above it in the gable is a circular ventilation hole. | II |
| Town Hall; 54.31007°N 1.83020°W | | 1856 | The town hall is rendered, on a stone plinth, with stone dressings, rusticated quoins, a floor band, a rendered cornice, a blind parapet, and Welsh slate roof. There are two storeys and fronts of six and two bays. In each front is a doorway with a cornice on consoles, one has been converted into a window, and two have steps with cast iron railings. The windows are sashes, with some converted into shop windows. | II |
| St Matthew's Church; 54.30901°N 1.82666°W | | 1868 | The church is in sandstone with a Welsh slate roof, and consists of a nave, a north aisle, a south porch, a chancel with a north vestry, and a west tower. The tower has three stages, a projecting stair turret on the southeast, a west window with a clock face above, two-light bell openings with a quatrefoil above, a string course and an embattled parapet. The east window has five lights. | II |
| War Memorial; 54.30994°N 1.83041°W | | c. 1920 | The war memorial is in granite, and consists of a Saxon-type cross on a square tapering base on three square steps. On the base are inscribed dates and the names of those lost in the First World, and on the top step is an inscription and the names of those lost in the Second World War. The memorial is enclosed by iron railings and a gate, on low sandstone walls. | II |
