= Leybourne (disambiguation) =

Leybourne is a small village and civil parish in Kent, England.

Leybourne may also refer to:

- Leybourne Islands, Nunavut, Canada
- Roger de Leybourne (1215–1271), Lord Warden of the Cinque Ports and Sheriff of Kent
- George Leybourne (1842–1884), English music hall performer
- William Leybourn (1626—1716), English surveyor and mathematician

== See also ==
- Leyburn (disambiguation)
- Legbourne
