= Wensley Quarry =

Quarry in North Yorkshire, England

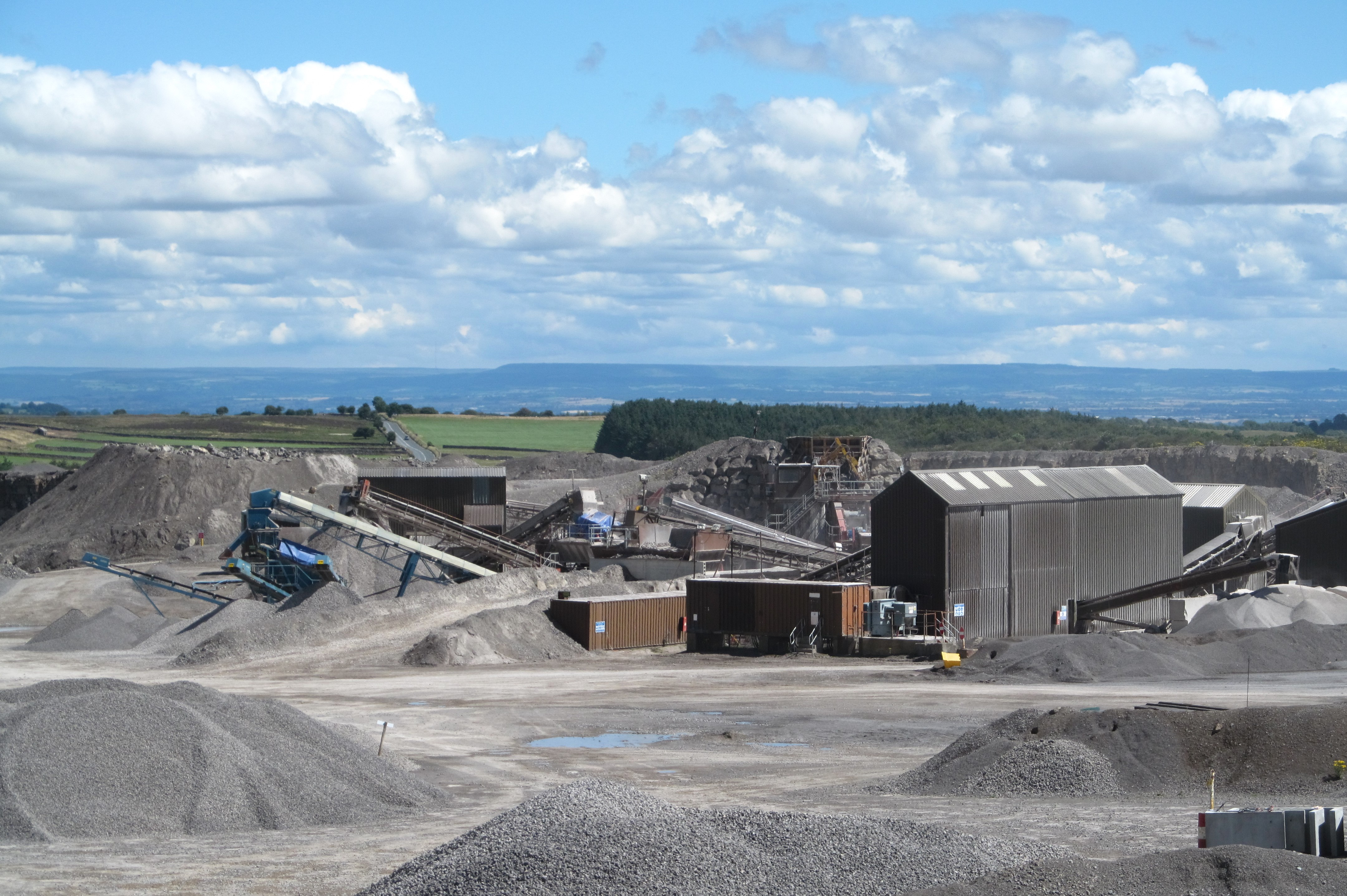
- Wensley Quarry

- Wensley Quarry
- Location: Preston-under-Scar, North Yorkshire, England; 54.323°N 1.900°W
- Products: Industrial carbonate Crushed rock aggregate Agricultural lime
- Opened: 1947
- Website: Official webpage

Wensley Quarry is an active limestone quarry near to Preston-under-Scar, North Yorkshire, England. Products from the quarry include industrial carbonate, crushed rock aggregate, and agricultural lime. The quarry used to send out regular trainloads of sinter dust to the steelworks on Teesside until 1992, when the railway loading point closed.

== History ==
Wensley Quarry did not start producing limestone until 1947, however, the adjacent quarry (Redmire Quarry) was sending out industrial lime as sinter dust to the ironworks on Teesside since 1912. When Redmire closed in 1992, Wensley Quarry increased its output of industrial carbonate, though it had been producing this commodity for British Steel in the 1970s and 1980s anyway. All of Wensley Quarry's current output goes by lorry along what is known locally as the Tank Road, (Note: The road Classified as C34 from Scarth Nick eastwards towards Catterick Garrison is used by tanks from the British Army base at Catterick Garrison. The road has been widened, flattened and re-surfaced to enable it to take tanks, and it is known locally as The Tank Road.) but that from Redmire was taken by an aerial ropeway to the loading sidings at Redmire railway station to be moved to Teesside via Wensleydale Railway until the loading point closed in 1992.

Wensley Quarry covers 124 hectares (310 acres), and is 1-kilometre (0.62 mi) north of the village of Preston-under-Scar. The quarry lies outside the Yorkshire Dales National Park, with the park boundaries being about 1.5 kilometres (0.93 mi) to the west, north, and south. The quarry is at an altitude of 300 metres (980 ft) above sea level and works a carboniferous limestone of the Alston Formation, producing rock for aggregate, industrial carbonate, and agricultural lime.

Whilst many limestone workings have historically been active in the area, Wensley Quarry was not developed until the 20th century, with planning permission granted in 1947. The permission covers an area of 322 hectares (800 acres) and had no time limit, something which prompted the residents of nearby Preston-under-Scar to clarify through an appeals process. A decision from the House of Lords means that a section of the quarry is free from being developed as part of the workings. The owners of the quarry (Tarmac) have permission to work the quarry face until 2042, though they have submitted an application to work the quarry site until 2053. English Nature and the local parish councils have raised concerns about the quarry as it borders the Lovely Seat SSSI to the north.

The quarry produces around 450,000 tonnes (500,000 tons) of limestone per year.
