= Tennants =

Auctioneers based in Leyburn, North Yorkshire, England

Coordinates: 54.3068°N 1.8151°W

Tennants is an auction house based at Leyburn in North Yorkshire, England. It claims to be the largest family-owned fine art auctioneers in the United Kingdom. The firm holds some 80 auctions a year and attracts buyers and sellers from around the world. It has twenty-seven specialist departments. Tennants premises include the Garden Rooms, a multi-purpose events and concert venue with a capacity for 640 people.

== History ==
The firm originated in Middleham, near Leyburn, where Edmund Tennant (born 1876) was a stonemason, grocer and agricultural merchant. His son Edmund expanded the business into auctioneering. The younger Edmund's sons John and Rodney also became auctioneers, and in 1971 John established himself at Leyburn. By 1988 the business focussed solely on fine art and antiques. In 1993 the current 40,000 square feet (3,700 m^{2}) salerooms were opened at Leyburn, and the Garden Rooms were added in 2014.
