= Leyburn Hall =

House in Leyburn, North Yorkshire, England

Coordinates: 54°18′35″N 1°49′54″W

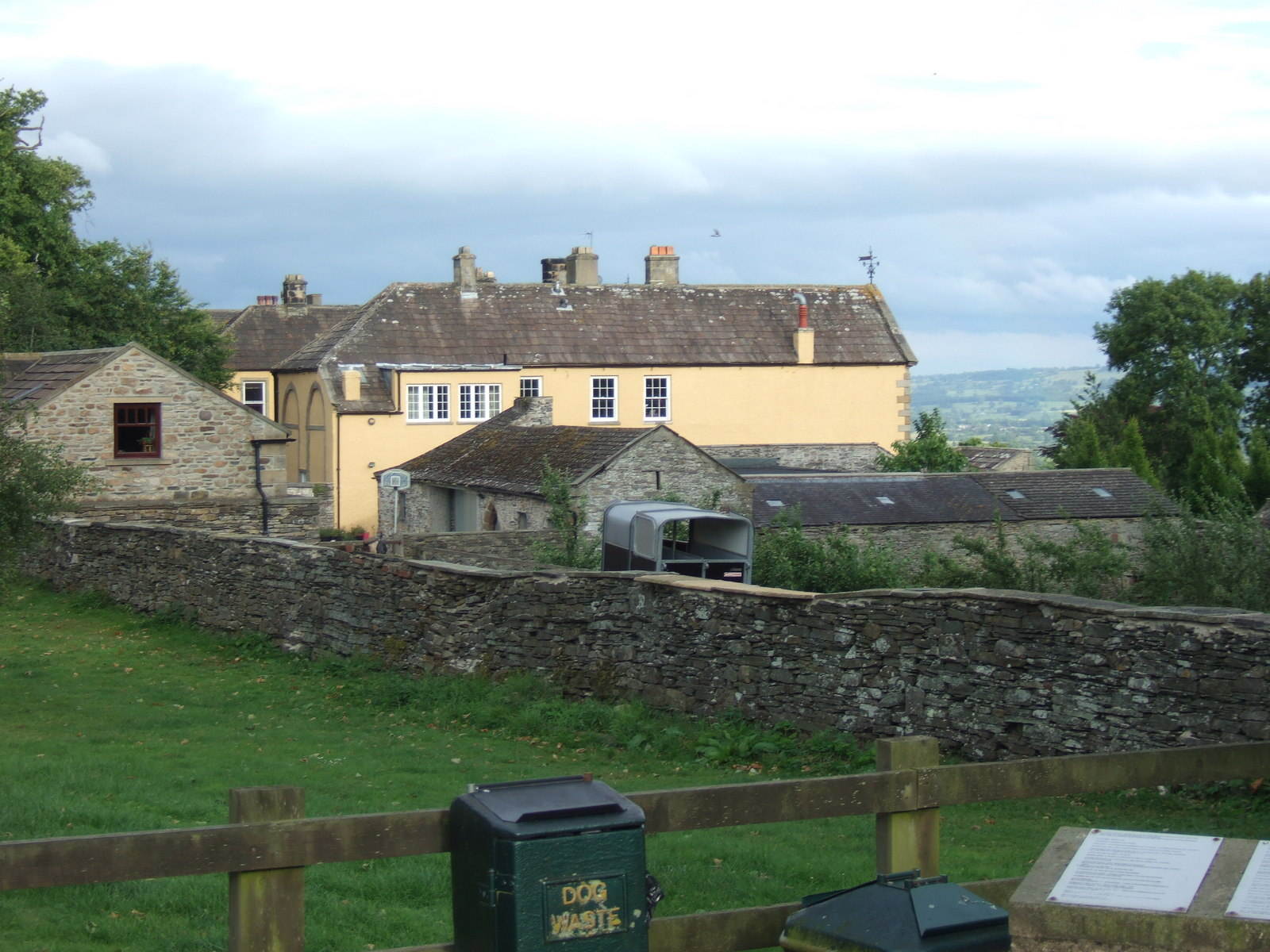
The building, in 2010

Leyburn Hall is a historic building in Leyburn, a town in North Yorkshire, in England.

The hall was built in about 1750, for John Yarker, although it is possible that it may retain some material from a 17th century forerunner. A Catholic chapel is supposed to have stood nearby, and it is possible that this may have been in the west pavilion. The house was grade II* listed in 1967.

The house is roughcast, and has stone dressings, a stone slate roof, two storeys and an E-shaped plan. The south front has a central five-bay block on a plinth, with rusticated quoins, a string course, a moulded cornice, and a blind parapet. The windows are sashes with moulded surrounds, the central ground floor window with an eared architrave and a cornice on consoles. The block is flanked by single-bay links containing openings with quoined surrounds. At the ends are pedimented pavilions with quoins, each containing a full-height round-arched opening with a moulded surround, and containing a tripartite window with Doric half-columns, and a Diocletian window above. On the top is a wrought iron weathervane. The north front has seven bays, a central Doric portico, and Venetian windows. Inside, there is a grand staircase hall with a plasterwork ceiling which may have been designed by Giuseppe Cortese. The Morning Room has early panelling, and both it and the Drawing Room have high-quality doorcases and cornices.

== See also ==
- Grade II* listed buildings in North Yorkshire (district)
- Listed buildings in Leyburn
