= Baron Wensleydale =

Baron Wensleydale may refer to:

- James Parke, Baron Wensleydale (1782–1868), English judge and Lord of Appeal in Ordinary
- Baron Wensleydale, a subsidiary title of Viscount Ridley, created in 1900
