= Preston-under-Scar =

Village and civil parish in North Yorkshire, England

Coordinates: 54°18′55″N 1°53′36″W

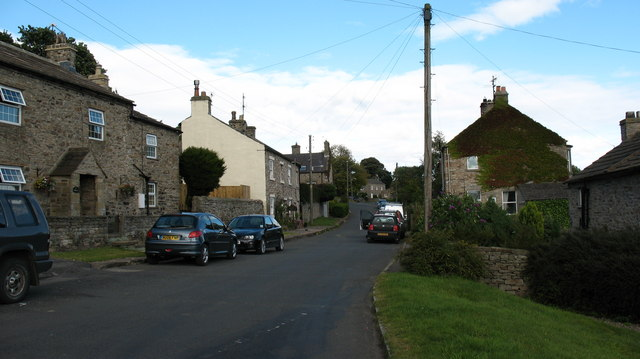
- Preston-under-Scar

- Location within North Yorkshire
- Population: 170
- OS grid reference: SE072922
  - London: 200 mi (320 km) SSE
- Unitary authority: North Yorkshire
- Ceremonial county: North Yorkshire
- Region: Yorkshire and the Humber
- Country: England
- Sovereign state: United Kingdom
- Post town: Leyburn
- Postcode district: DL8
- Police: North Yorkshire
- Fire: North Yorkshire
- Ambulance: Yorkshire

Preston-under-Scar is a village and civil parish in North Yorkshire, England. It is situated approximately 2 miles (4 km) west of Leyburn. The village population was 120 at the 2001 census, increasing to 170 by the 2011 census. The village is mentioned in the Domesday Book as belonging to Thorfin of Ravensworth, but the tenant-in-chief being Count Alan of Bedale. The name of the village derives form a mixture of Old English and Old Norse and was originally prēost tūn sker, which translates as Priests farm (or settlement) under rock (or cliff).

The village used to be in the Wapentake of Hang West and in the parish of Wensley. From 1974 to 2023 it was part of the district of Richmondshire. It is now administered by the unitary North Yorkshire Council.

== Facilities ==
The village is mostly contained in a conservation area that was designated in 1989. It is just outside of the Yorkshire Dales National Park due to quarrying and a military firing range which lie just to the north of the village. Besides quarrying (which is still ongoing in the modern era) the area was also known for its iron ore and lead industries. These were documented as far back as the early 14th century though may have been explored earlier.

There are remains of the old lead mining industry in the nearby Condenser Wood. Some of the old lead processing buildings of Keld Heads Mine are still standing and are now listed buildings, including the peat store that would house a years' worth of peat to be used in smelting lead. Various chimneys were built to vent the fumes from the smelting process, but these were quite low in the valley and would cling to the surroundings rather than disperse. Because of this, a flue was constructed that extended for 2 miles (3 km) in a northerly direction and fed into a chimney at Cobscar Mill above Preston-under-Scar at 1,250 feet (381 m) above sea level.

Traditionally, Christian worship took place at the church in Wensley as there was no church in the village save for a small Methodist chapel, but the village does have the small St Margaret's Church which was constructed in 1862 and is now a grade II listed building. However, services are only held twice-monthly.

The Wensleydale Railway passes just to the south of the village. Previously, the village and that of neighbouring Wensley were served by Wensley railway station on the line and whilst the line has been re-opened as a heritage railway, the station is in private hands and has not been opened up to passengers.

== See also ==
- Listed buildings in Preston-under-Scar
