= George Bland Humble =

Major George Bland Humble
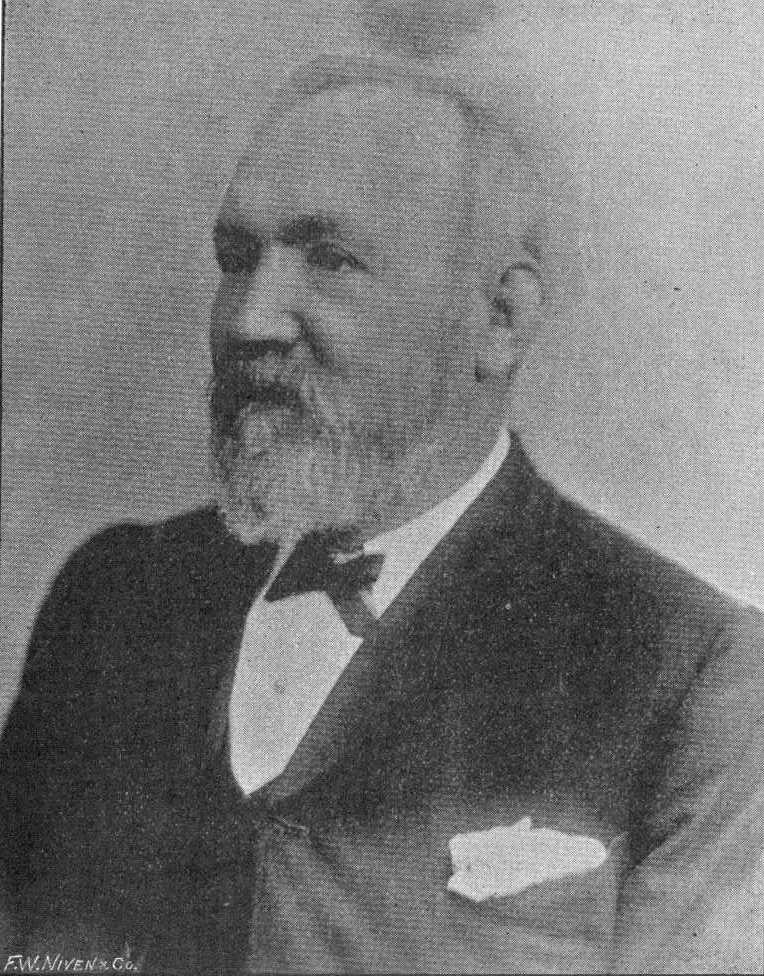
- Born: 22 December 1839; Leyburn Moor House, near Richmond, North Yorkshire, England
- Status: Mason
- Died: 23 October 1930 (aged 90); Fremantle, Western Australia
- Spouse: Ellen Humble (née Allpike)
- Children: Major John Humble

George Bland Humble (22 December 1839 – 23 October 1930) was born in Leyburn, North Yorkshire. Educated at the Wesleyan School, Richmond and the Wesleyan Normal Institute in Marylebone, London, he was appointed as Headmaster of the Wesleyan School in 1860. Four years later he immigrated to Australia, and after a year teaching in a primitive schoolhouse at Greenough he became headmaster of Fremantle Boys' School, a post he held from 1864 until 1889.

He was commissioned second lieutenant in the Volunteer Rifle Corps in 1864, from which he retired (as a major) in 1889. He became the first Town Clerk of Fremantle in 1871 and served until 1904. He also was Secretary of the Fremantle Building Society for 25 years and Deacon of the Fremantle Congregational Church.

Humble married Ellen Allpike in 1864. There were two sons and five daughters. His son Major John Humble was officer-in-charge of the Fremantle Rifle Volunteers, and his grandson Captain Forrest Hopetown Bland Humble was Harbour Master of Fremantle Harbour in 1953.

He was a Mason. He died on 23 October 1930.
