= Milners of Leyburn =

Department store in Leyburn, Wensleydale, North Yorkshire, England

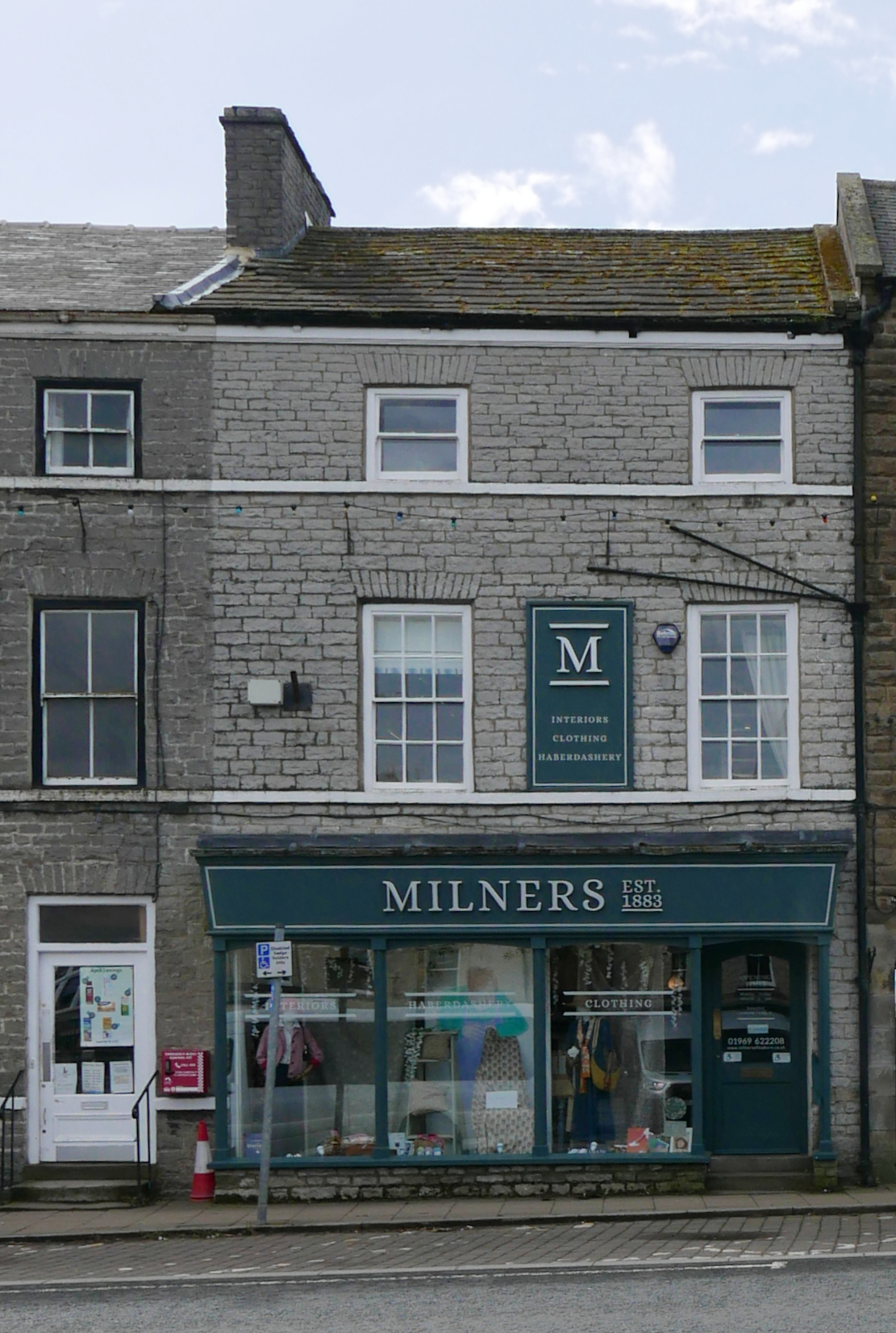
Milners shop front, 2026

Milners of Leyburn, also known as C Milner & Sons, is a small, family-run department store in the market town of Leyburn, Wensleydale, North Yorkshire, England. On the ground floor, they sell women's clothing and accessories from brands including Seasalt, White Stuff and Powder accessories, as well as hosting a haberdashery section filled with fabric remnants, wool, buttons, and much more. Milners Interiors, (on the first floor) provides a made to measure service in curtains, blinds and shutters and a selection of carpets and range of flooring. They host a wide range of fabric and wallpaper sample books from well established brand houses, such as Morris & Co and Colefax and Fowler, as well as Little Greene Paint Company's complete selection of paints.

The business was started in 1882 by Christopher Milner, hence the C in the name, with a shop in Hawes, and is now in its fifth generation in the family following the retirement of David Milner in March 2008.

The BBC made a television documentary series of three programmes, entitled 'The Department Store'. Produced by Richard Macer, it was about independent department stores and how they are surviving in the modern world in the face of stiff competition from chain stores. The first programme in the series, on Milners, was filmed by the BBC from September 2007 to April 2008. It was initially shown on BBC Four on 17 November 2008 and subsequently on BBC Two on 7 April 2009.

David Milner, who was featured in the programme, has retired and even assisted with a charity expedition to the Gambia in January 2010. His daughter, Leonie, with her husband, Keith Garrard, are now Managing Directors of the store which continues to trade after 140 years of serving the Dales.
