= Leyburn Old Glebe =

Nature reserve in England

Coordinates: 54.3025°N 1.8470°W

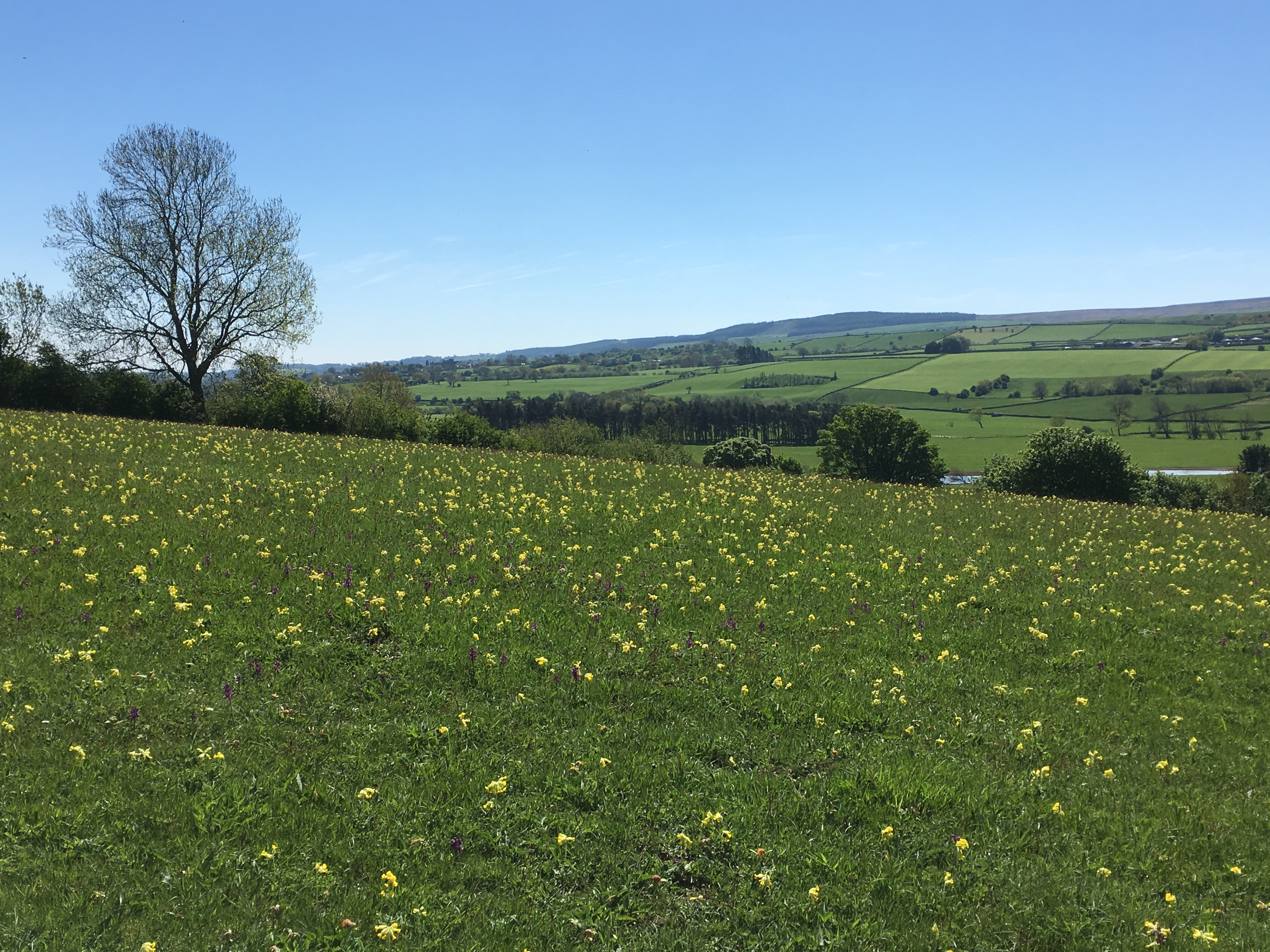
The view from Leyburn Old Glebe, across the valley of the River Ure, in Spring 2018

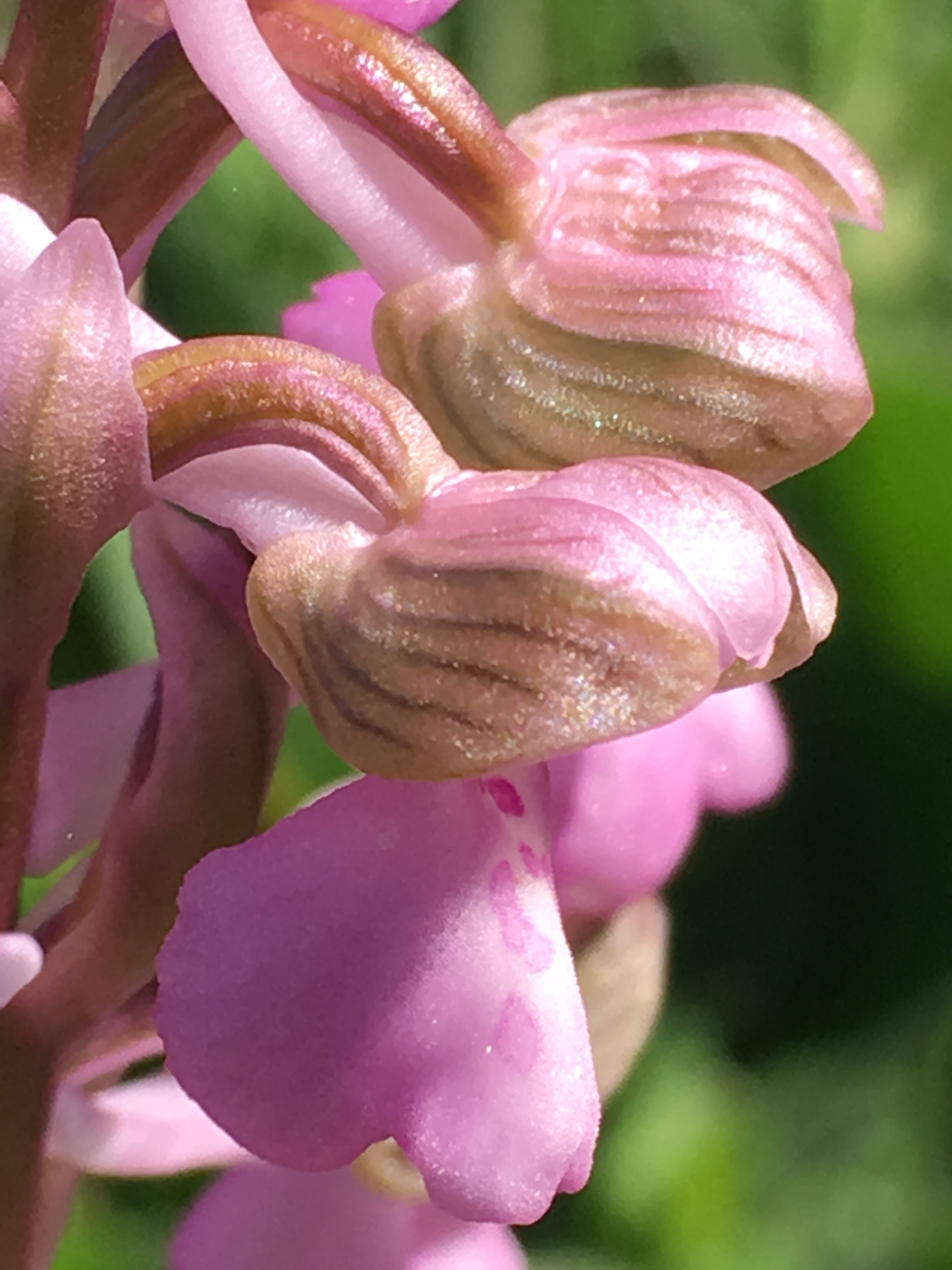
pink form of Anacamptis morio, photographed at Leyburn Old Glebe in 2018

Leyburn Old Glebe Nature Reserve is a nature reserve and Site of Special Scientific Interest (SSSI) managed by the Yorkshire Wildlife Trust. It is about 440 yards (400 m) east of the village of Wensley and 0.6 miles (1 km) southwest of Leyburn. The site is a traditionally-managed 3 hectare hay meadow on a south-facing slope, overlooking the River Ure. It is one of the best preserved unimproved meadows in the Yorkshire Dales. Each year, after the flowers have set seed, an autumn hay cut and grazing by a limited number of sheep are essential management to prevent the area becoming overgrown.

Meadows have declined in Britain over the last century, due mainly to intensive agriculture, and it is estimated that 97% of Britain's meadows have been destroyed since the 1930s, so areas like Leyburn Glebe are vital to the survival of many plant species. Many unusual flowers can be seen there. The Wildlife Trust ask that visitors keep to the edges of the meadow so that rare and/or delicate plants are not damaged.

Animals seen in the reserve include small skipper butterfly, yellowhammer and stoat.

The word glebe means land that was granted to the local priest, to provide him with an income. It comes from the Latin gleba, meaning clod/soil/land. The nature reserve was owned by a local church until 1983.
