= Wensley, North Yorkshire =

Village and civil parish in North Yorkshire, England

Coordinates: 54.30175°N 1.85862°W

Wensley
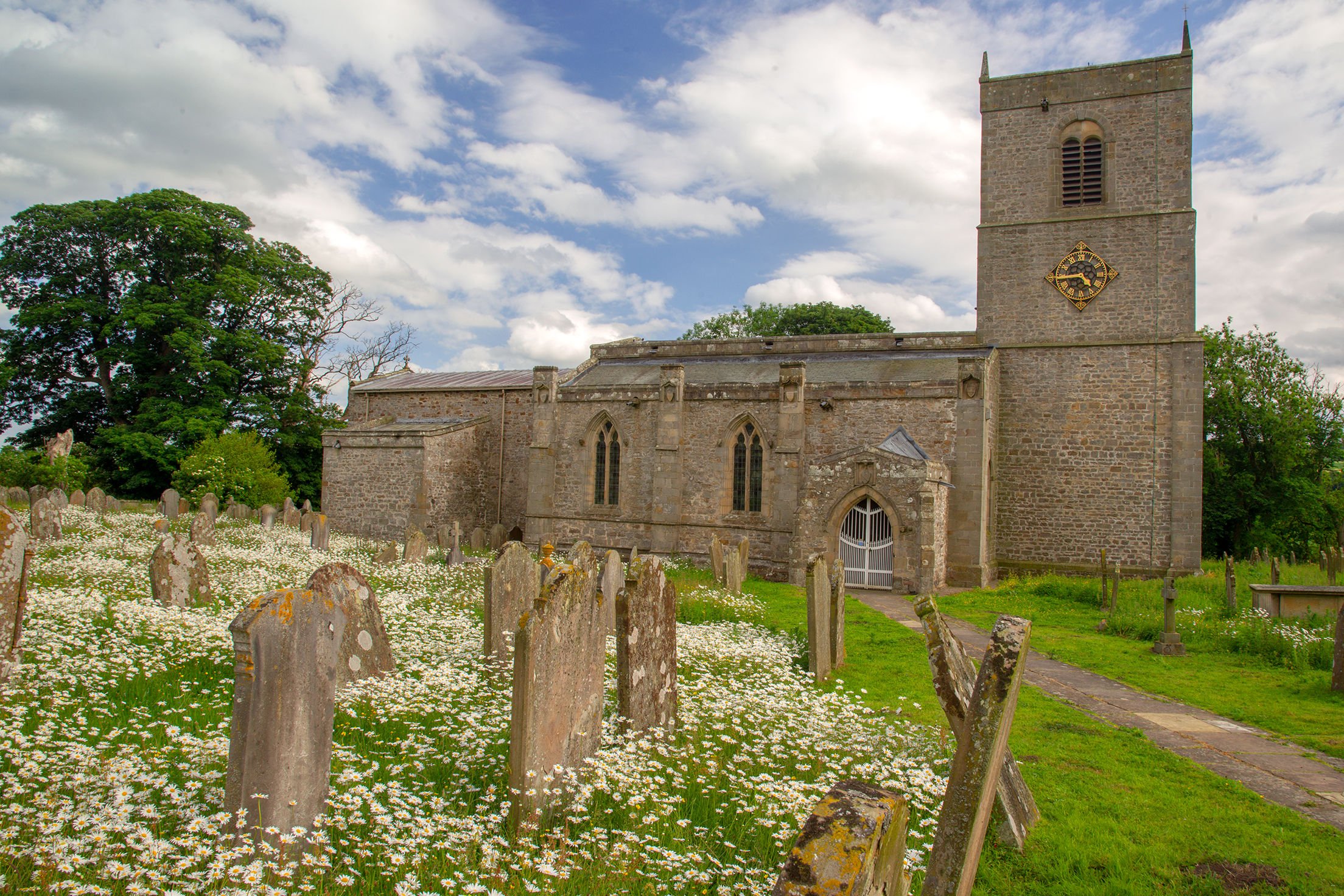
- Holy Trinity Church, Wensley

- Location within North Yorkshire
- Population: 151 (2011 census)
- OS grid reference: SE092895
  - London: 200 mi (320 km) SSE
- Unitary authority: North Yorkshire
- Ceremonial county: North Yorkshire
- Region: Yorkshire and the Humber
- Country: England
- Sovereign state: United Kingdom
- Post town: LEYBURN
- Postcode district: DL8
- Police: North Yorkshire
- Fire: North Yorkshire
- Ambulance: Yorkshire

Wensley is a small village and civil parish in North Yorkshire, England. It consists of a few homes and holiday cottages, an inn, a pub and a historic church. It is on the A684 road, 1 mile (1.6 km) south-west of the market town of Leyburn. The River Ure passes through the village. From 1974 to 2023 it was part of the district of Richmondshire. It is now administered by the unitary North Yorkshire Council.

The etymology of the name ultimately originates either from a compound of an Old English form of the god Woden (attested Wednesleg c. 1212, earlier Wodnesleie, see Wednesday), and the Old English leah meaning wood or meadow. Another possible route for the first part is the personal name Wændel. Wensley gives its name to the dale Wensleydale.

For a century after its charter in 1202, Wensley had the only market in the dale, and this continued into the 16th century. Plague struck Wensley in 1563, some surviving villagers fled to Leyburn, but the village recovered a century later when Charles Paulet built Bolton Hall in 1678 and became Duke of Bolton. Bolton Hall, is now 1.2 miles (1.9 km) from the heart of Wensley, near Preston-under-Scar, Richmondshire; it was rebuilt after a fire in 1902.

Wensley's Holy Trinity Church dates to 1300 and is a Grade I listed building. It is now redundant and cared for by the Churches Conservation Trust. It was featured as the wedding venue of James and Helen Herriot in the 1978 BBC television series All Creatures Great and Small, in the episode "The Last Furlong".

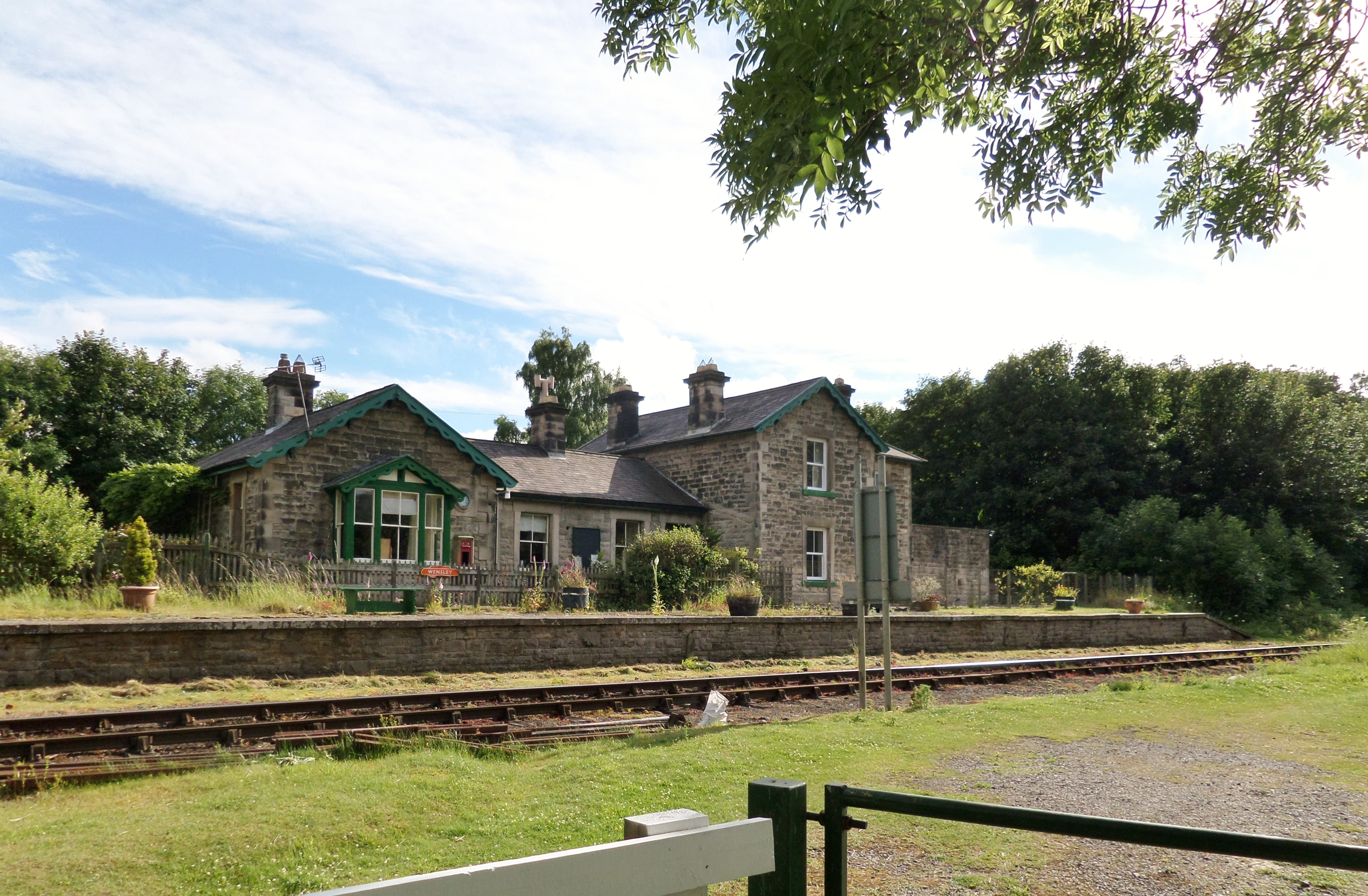
Wensley old railway station buildings and platform, Wensleydale Railway, North Yorkshire

Wensley's railway station is now closed. It was situated 1-mile (1.6 km) to the north between Wensley and Preston-under-Scar, on the Wensleydale Railway line, which still passes the village.

Leyburn Old Glebe nature reserve lies about 440 yards (400 m) east of the village.

Ernie Gillatt, a footballer active in the 1920s, was born in Wensley.

== See also ==
- Listed buildings in Wensley, North Yorkshire
