= Wensleydale School =

Community school in Leyburn, North Yorkshire, England

The Wensleydale School and Sixth Form
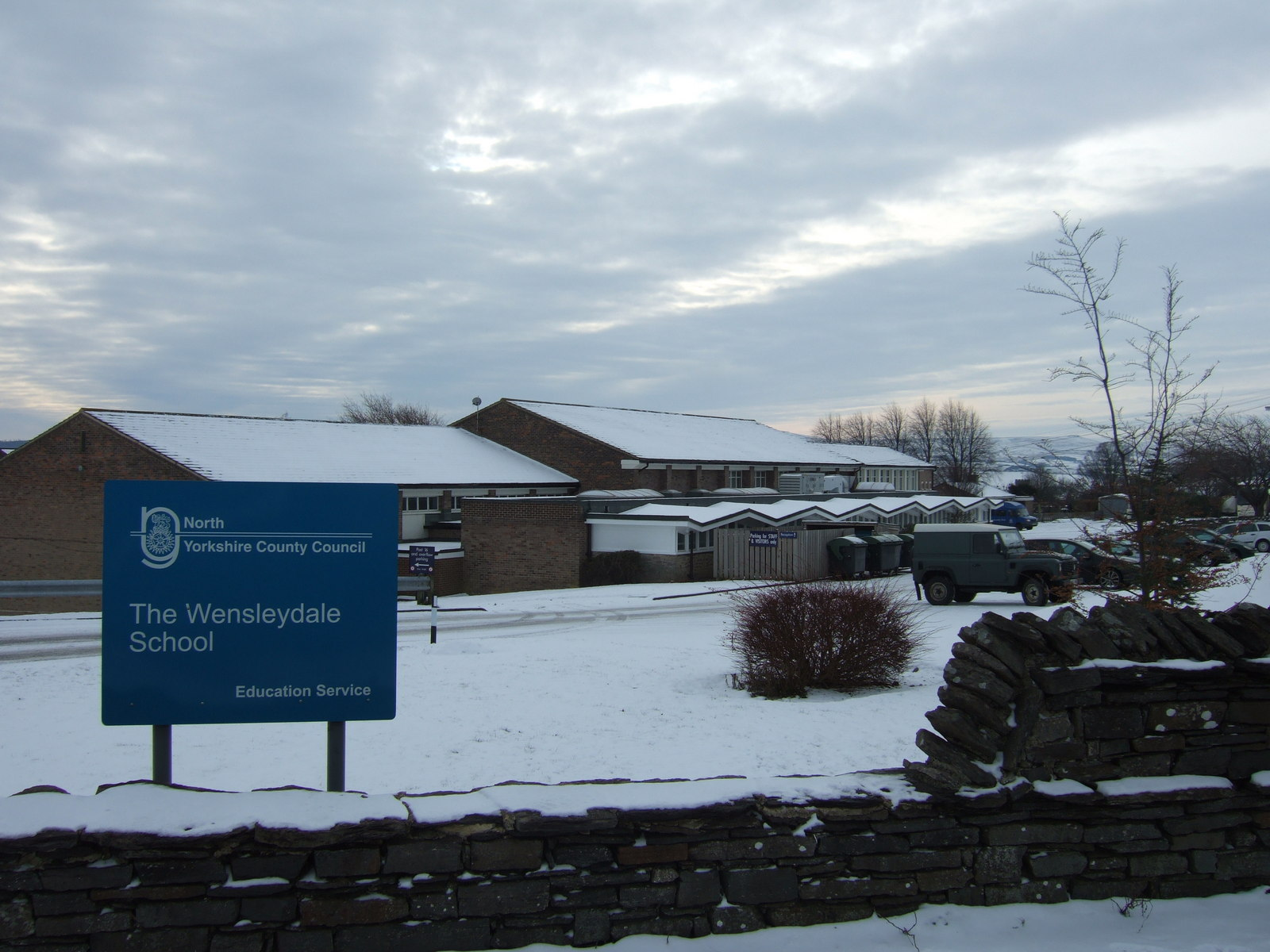

Location
- Richmond Road; Leyburn, North Yorkshire, DL8 5HY; England; 54.313290°N 1.823940°W

Information
- Type: Community school
- Motto: "Students and Community First"
- Established: 1959
- Department for Education URN: 121679 Tables
- Ofsted: Reports
- Headteacher: J. Polley
- Age: 11 to 16
- Enrolment: 513
- Website: http://www.wensleydale.n-yorks.sch.uk

The Wensleydale School and Sixth Form is a co-educational comprehensive school situated on Richmond Road, Leyburn, North Yorkshire, England.

== History ==
When the school opened in 1959 as Leyburn County Modern School, it became the community school for the whole of Wensleydale and, in 1971, it reached further when it became a comprehensive school by combining with Yorebridge Grammar School in Askrigg. In 2008, the school opened a new post-16 block. Through a partnership with Queen Elizabeth College Darlington, additional courses are offered to certain year students. Approximately 500 pupils attend the school, whose ages range from 11 to 16. The majority of pupils come from eight small, local primary schools in the Wensleydale area, although its reach does stretch further.

== Awards ==
In 2006, the school was awarded specialist school status as a Science College and gained a Healthy Schools award.

== Notable pupils ==
- Nottingham Forrest centre back Michael Dawson attended the school from 1994 to 1999.
- Wendy Morton, Conservative MP.
