= Leyburn =

Market town in North Yorkshire, England

Coordinates: 54°18′36″N 1°49′39″W

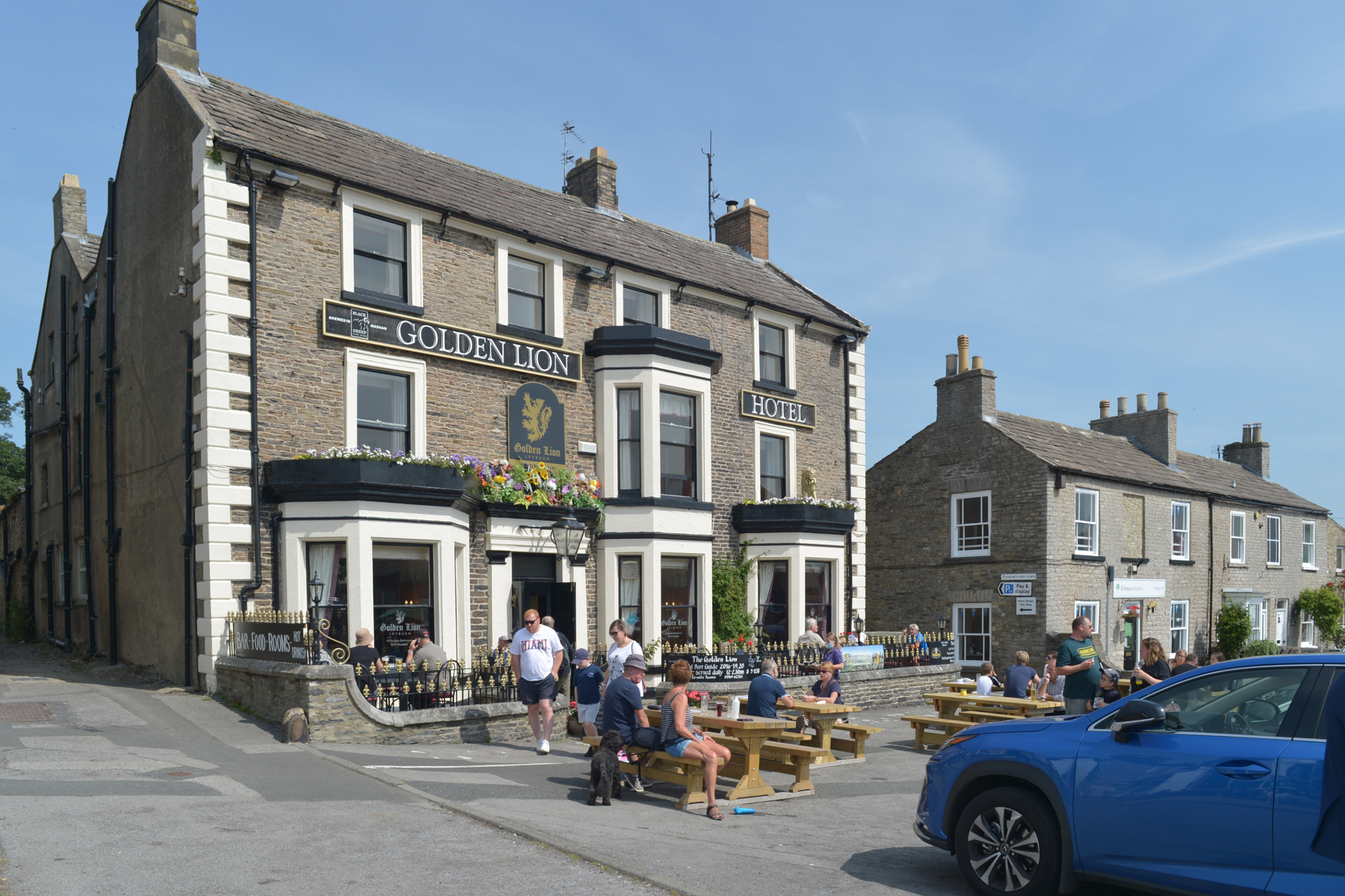
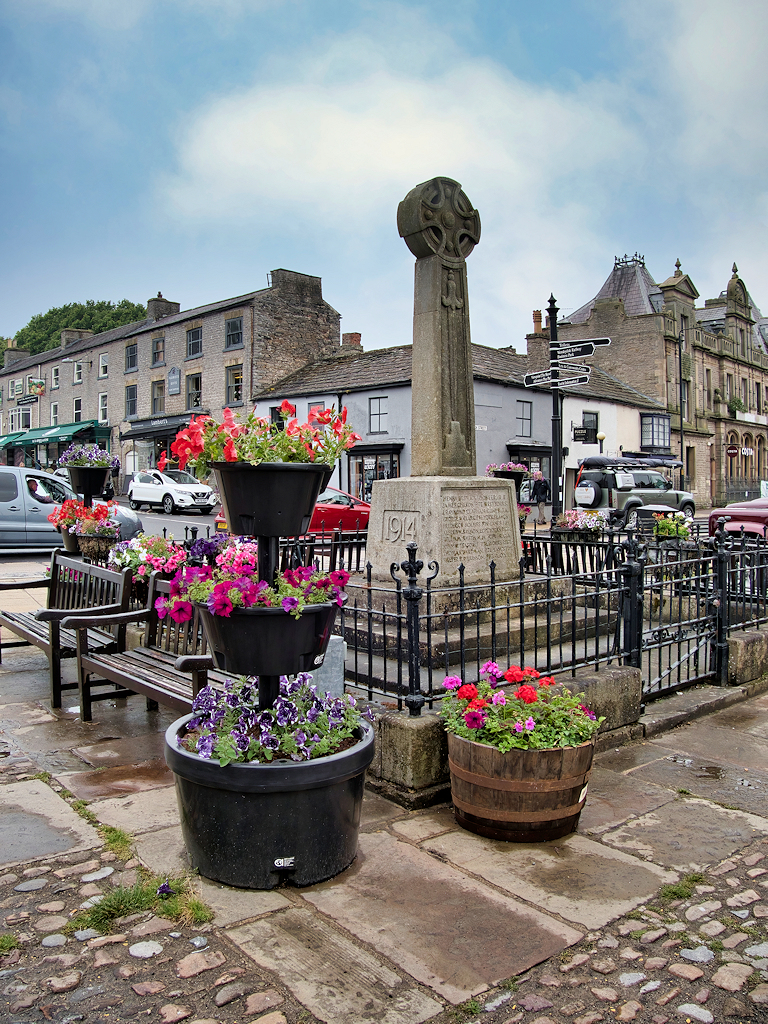
- Market Place War Memorial

- Location within North Yorkshire
- Population: 2,183 (2011 census)
- OS grid reference: SE114904
- Civil parish: Leyburn
- Unitary authority: North Yorkshire
- Ceremonial county: North Yorkshire
- Region: Yorkshire and the Humber
- Country: England
- Sovereign state: United Kingdom
- Post town: LEYBURN
- Postcode district: DL8
- Dialling code: 01969
- Police: North Yorkshire
- Fire: North Yorkshire
- Ambulance: Yorkshire
- UK Parliament: Richmond and Northallerton

Leyburn is a market town and civil parish in North Yorkshire, England, sitting above the northern bank of the River Ure in Wensleydale. Historically in the North Riding of Yorkshire, the name was derived from 'Ley' or 'Le' (clearing), and 'burn' (stream), meaning clearing by the stream. Leyburn had a population of 1,844 at the 2001 census increasing to 2,183 at the 2011 Census. The estimated population in 2015 was 2,190.

== History ==
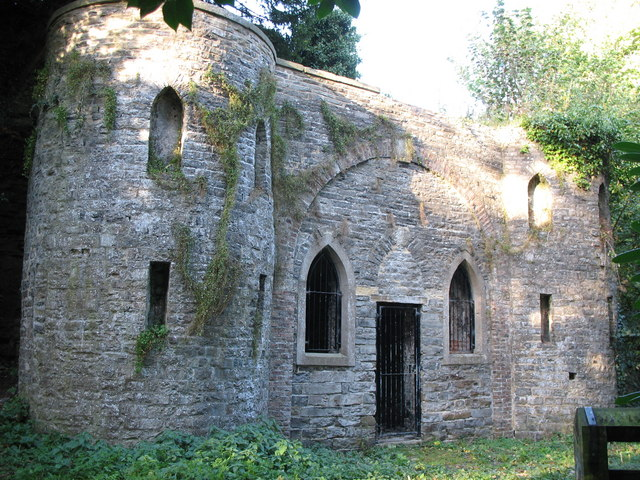
Leyburn Sham Castle

Leyburn was mentioned in the Domesday Book of 1086 but had no recorded population. The much later growth of Leyburn as a major hub is linked to the decline in fortunes of nearby Wensley, which had prominence as the only market town in Wensleydale; the village had received its Royal Charter in 1202 but declined dramatically after being devastated by the plague in 1563. In fact, the once important and prosperous town was mostly abandoned. Leyburn's stature increased by the 17th century when a market charter was granted by Charles II in 1686. Leyburn Town Hall was built in 1856 by Lord Bolton, and now houses several shops. In 1870-72 John Marius Wilson's Imperial Gazetteer of England and Wales described Leyburn.

== Governance ==
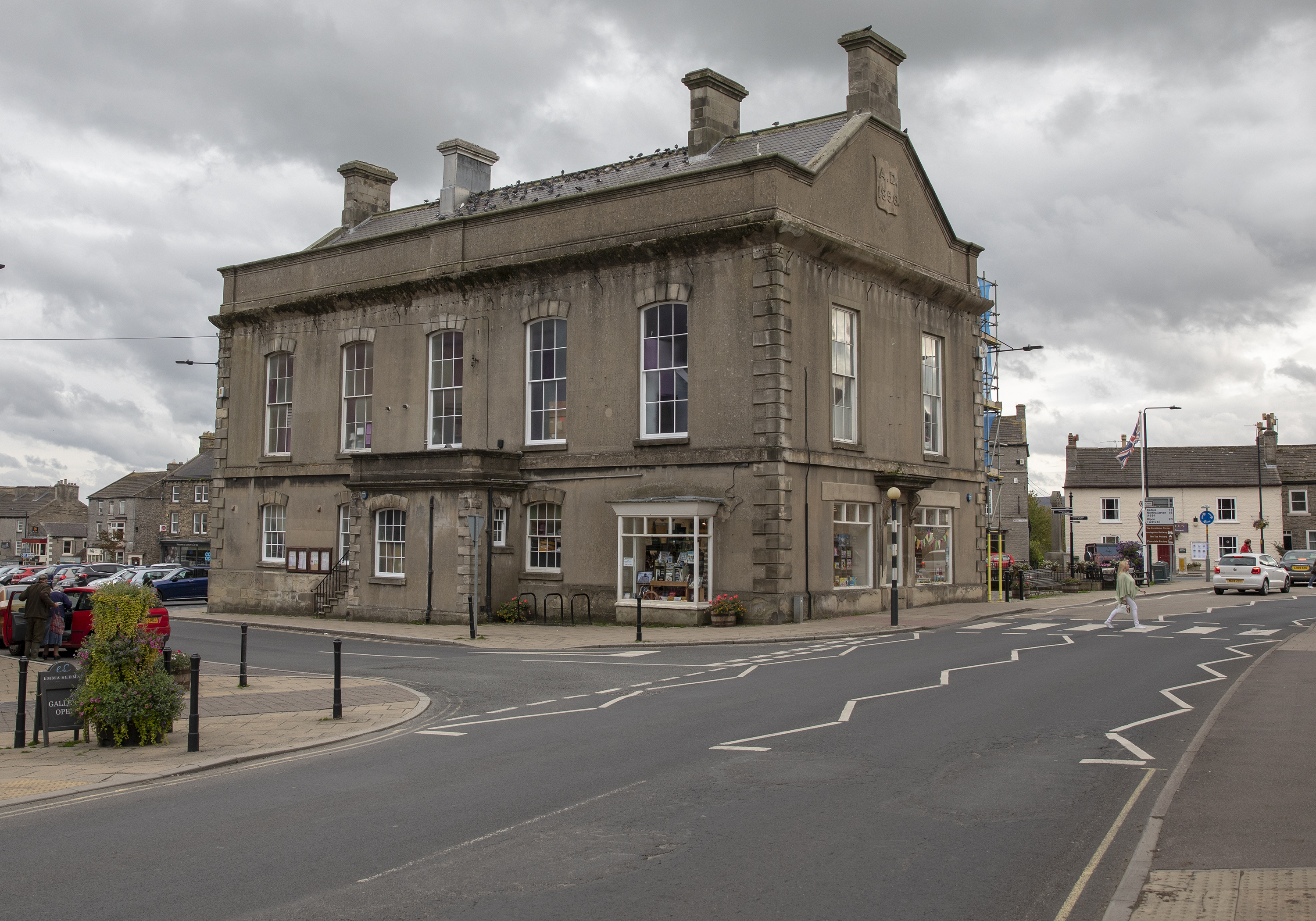
Leyburn Town Hall

From 1974 to 2023 it was part of the district of Richmondshire, it is now administered by the unitary North Yorkshire Council.

An electoral ward for in the same name exists; this ward includes Harmby with a total population of 2,554. The local town council is housed in Thornborough Hall, dating back to the 1830s, the building also houses the local library, a North Yorkshire Council register office, and several private offices.

The town lies within the Richmond and Northallerton UK parliamentary constituency, which is under the control of the Conservative Party. The current Member of Parliament since the 2015 general election is Rishi Sunak, the former Prime Minister of the United Kingdom.

== Geography ==
Leyburn is situated approximately 19 miles (31 km) west of the county town Northallerton, on the northern banks of the River Ure, near to the eastern border of the Yorkshire Dales National Park, at the edge of a valley or dale known as Wensleydale, which takes its name from the village of Wensley, 1.8 miles (2.9 km) to the west. Leyburn is close to a meadow nature reserve called Leyburn Old Glebe.

== Demography ==
According to the 2011 United Kingdom census, the ward of Leyburn (including Harmby) had a total resident population of 2,554, with 1,335 females and 1,219 males. 98.2% of the population identified as white British, 1.1% as other white, a total of 1.8% identified as being of a non-white ethnic background including 0.5% Asian British, and 0.7% as black, Afro-Caribbean or black British. The place of birth of the town's residents was 95.5% United Kingdom, 1.5% from European Union countries, and 2.5% from elsewhere in the world. 75.6% described themselves as having religious beliefs; 74.9% of those were Christian, 0.8% is made up of all other religions, the largest being buddhism at 0.4%, 16.2% stated they had no religion and 8.2% did not state a religion.

The following table shows historic population changes in the Leyburn parish area between 1881 and 1961.

Year	1881	1891	1901	1911	1921	1931	1951	1961
Population	972	982	847	832	868	1,440	1,281	1,357

== Economy ==
Leyburn is a gateway town to the Yorkshire Dales National Park and relies heavily on tourism, the national park attracted 520,000 overnight visitors in 2017.

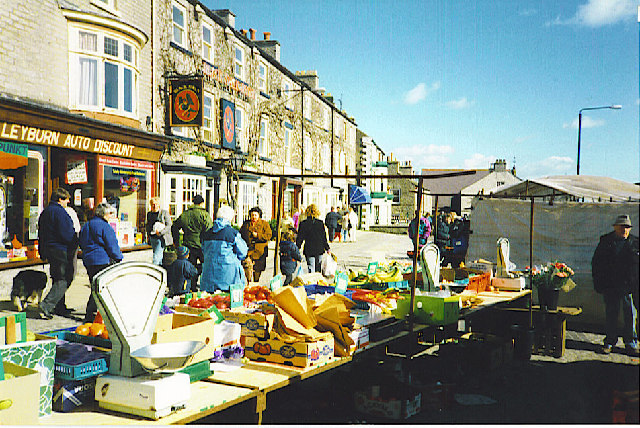
Leyburn Marketplace

The market place is home to several shops, pubs, and restaurants, including national retailers Co-op Food and One Stop, as well as notable independent businesses such as the department store Milners of Leyburn, which opened in 1882 and is currently in its fifth generation of family ownership, and Campbell's of Leyburn, a grocers dating back to 1868. A traditional outdoor market is held in the square every Friday, along with a livestock auction mart that started in 1918.

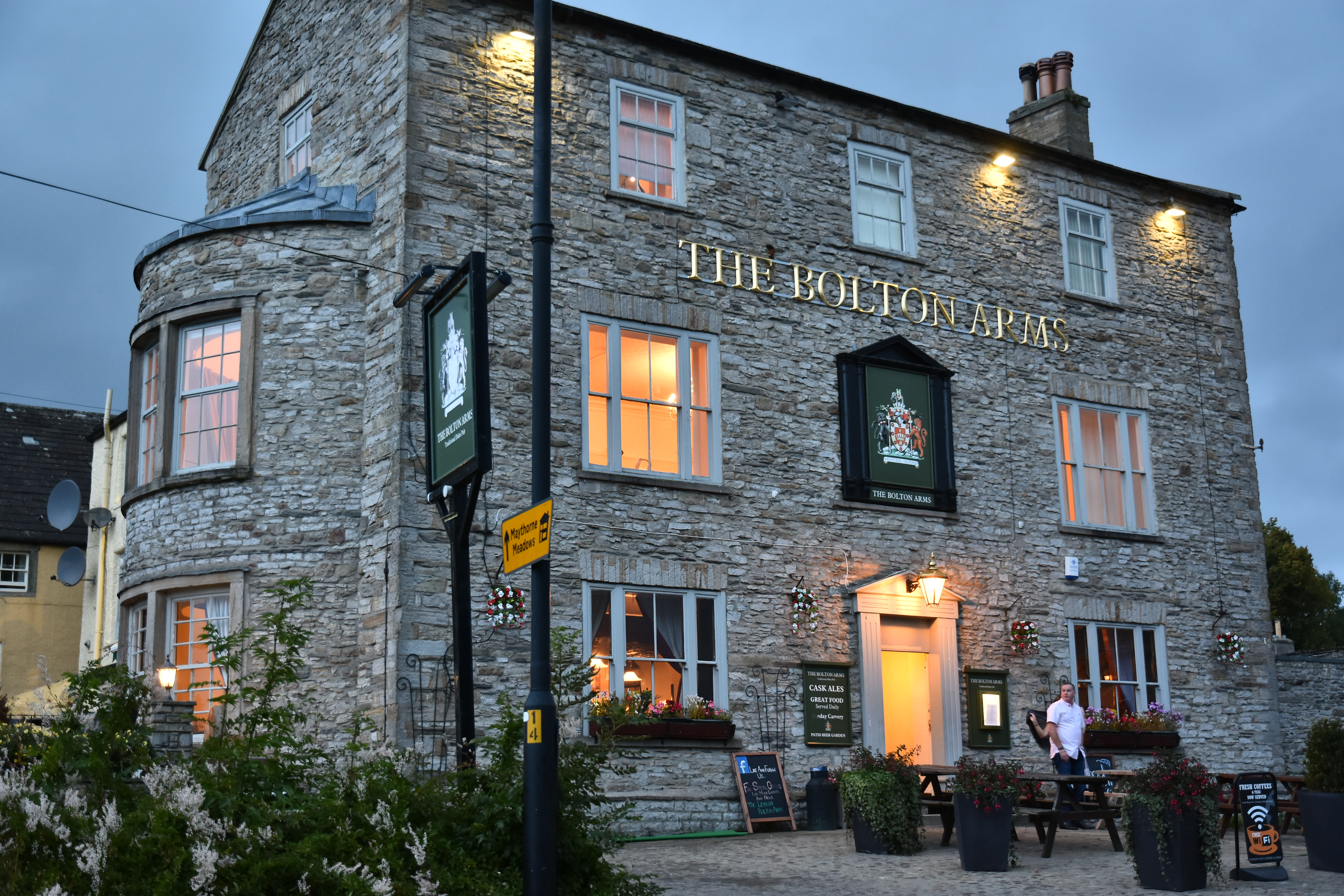
Bolton Arms Hotel

Other businesses and industries located outside the market place include a local brewery, a chocolate maker and a Royal Mail delivery office.

Tennants Auctioneers, situated on Harmby road, is one of the largest auction houses in the UK, holding more than 80 sales each year and attracting buyers and sellers from around the world. Adjacent to Tennants is The Garden Rooms, a multi-purpose events and exhibitions venue with a capacity for 640 people.

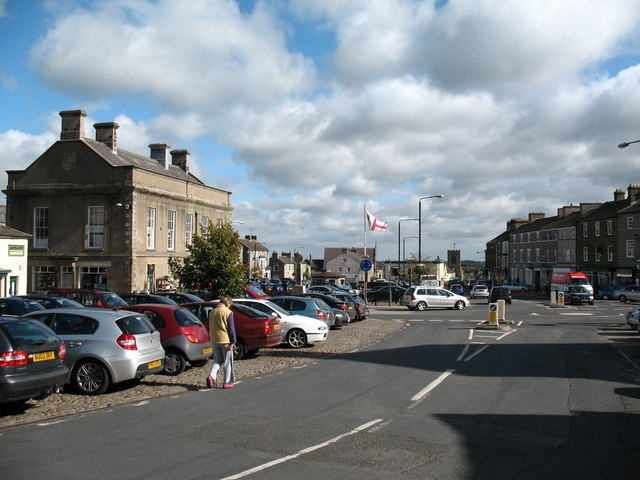
Commercial Square

According to the 2011 United Kingdom census, the economic activity of residents aged 16–74 was 43.5% in full-time employment, 5.0% in part-time employment, 21.0% self-employed, 3.1% unemployed, 2.2% students with jobs, 2.0% students without jobs, 19.7% retired, 0.4% looking after home or family, 2.1% permanently sick or disabled, and 0.8% economically inactive for other reasons.

The average price of a house in Leyburn for the 12-month period ending February 2020 was £197,750 compared to £223,537 for North Yorkshire and the national average of £232,320.

== Landmarks ==
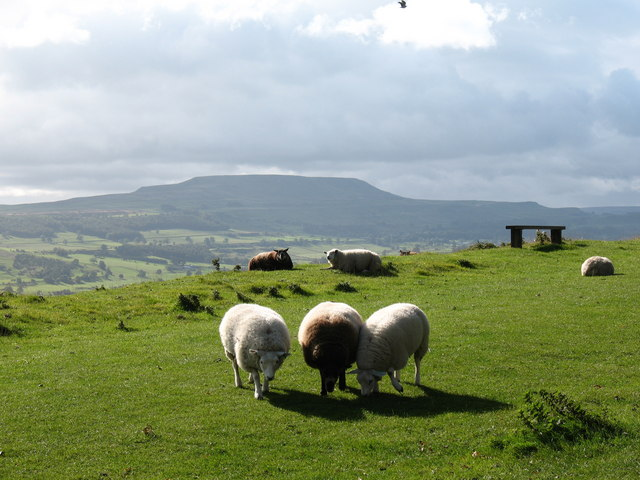
Leyburn Shawl

Leyburn Shawl, an escarpment of about 1.5 miles (2.4 km) in length is located to the west of the town, it provides panoramic views of Wensleydale and links to footpaths towards Preston-under-Scar and Castle Bolton. According to legend, Mary, Queen of Scots, upon fleeing captivity in nearby Bolton Castle, dropped her shawl en route to Leyburn.

A grade II listed war memorial in the form of a cross is situated in the market place, commemorating the lives lost in both the First and Second World War. Leyburn Hall, also a listed building, dates back to 1750.

=== Religious sites ===
Leyburn has four Christian places of worship; St Peter and St Paul's Roman Catholic church built in 1835, the Wensleydale Evangelical Church (built in 1875 and formerly a congregational church until the early 1960s), the Leyburn Methodist Church dating back to 1884, and just east of the town centre the Anglican church of St Matthew, built in 1868.

== Transport ==
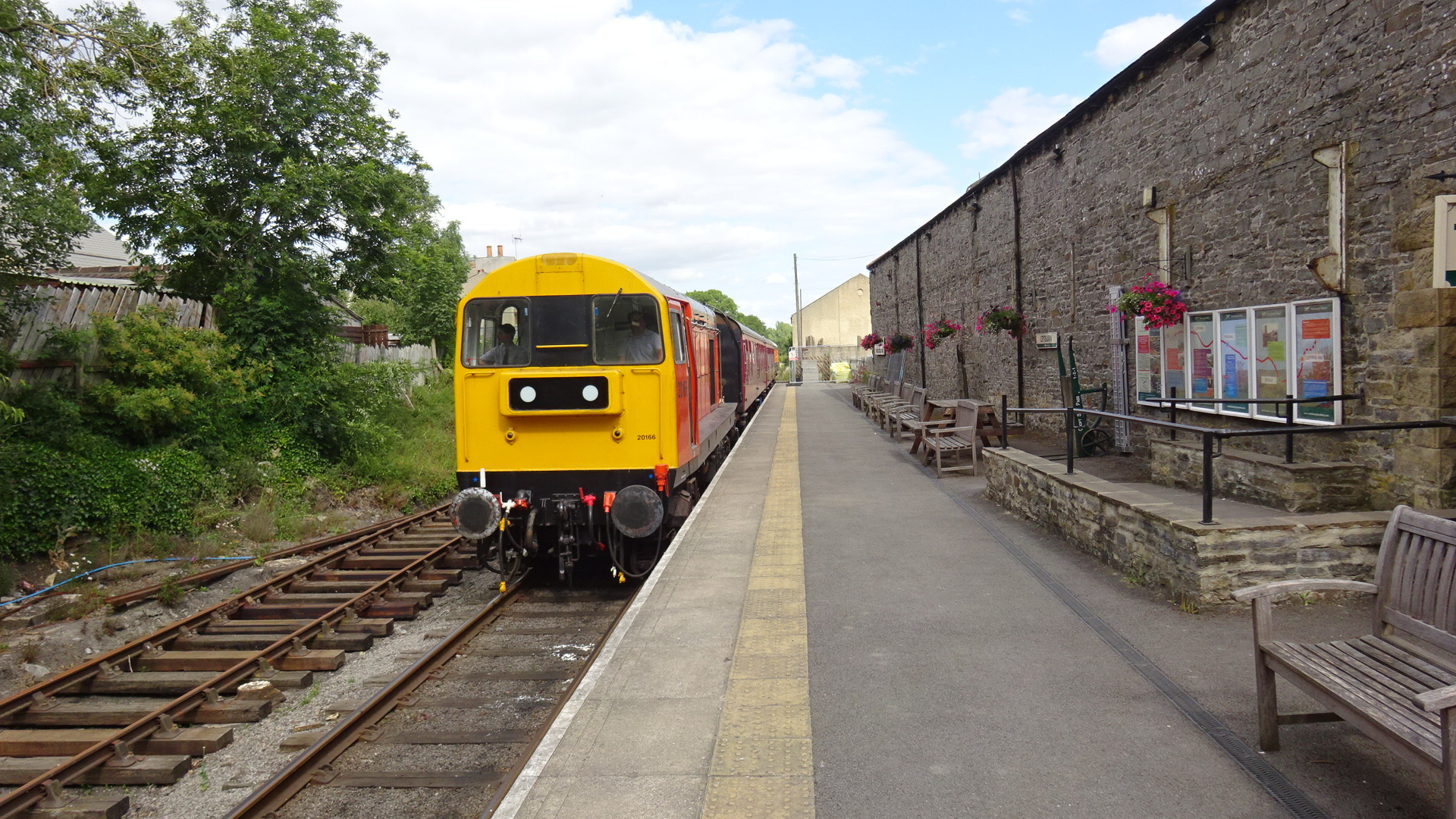
Leyburn railway station

Leyburn has its own railway station on the heritage Wensleydale Railway; this is the last stop westbound before the terminus at Redmire. Trains also run eastbound towards Bedale and Northallerton.

Local bus services to Hawes, Northallerton, Richmond and Ripon are provided by Dales & District.

The town lies on a crossroads of the A684 road between Northallerton and Kendal, and the A6108 between Scotch Corner and Ripon.

== Education ==
The town's secondary school, The Wensleydale School, has just over 500 pupils, with a catchment are spanning through most of Wensleydale. The school previously had a sixth form, however this was closed in August 2025. In 2006, Wensleydale School became a Specialist Science College under a programme discontinued in 2010.

The town's primary school is Leyburn Community Primary School, from where a vast majority of the pupils proceed to the Wensleydale School for secondary education, in 2017 the school became an academy. Leyburn's second primary school, St Peter and St Paul RC primary school dated back to 1835, but in 2011 it was closed due to financially unviable pupil numbers, having just 15 pupils in its last academic year.

== Culture and community ==
=== Sport ===
The town's football club, Leyburn FC, play in the Wensleydale Creamery League, an affiliate league of the North Riding County Football Association, another local team, Leyburn United FC, once reached the Harrogate and District Football League, until their resignation in 2016. United no longer have senior representation and has rebranded as Leyburn United JFC, for players aged 4 to 14.

Wensleydale RUFC, a rugby union club based in Leyburn currently play in Yorkshire 2, having been promoted from Yorkshire 3 as champions in the 2018–19 season.

Leyburn once had a golf club, founded in 1895 and lasting until the late 1950s.

The Tour de Yorkshire in May 2018 started in Richmond and finished in Scarborough, the cyclists travelled through Leyburn. The town was also due to be the finishing point for stage 2 of the 2020 Tour de Yorkshire, however, on 17 March it was announced that the event would be postponed due to the COVID-19 pandemic.

The torch relay for the 2012 Summer Olympics held in London passed through Leyburn.

=== Cinema and theatre ===
Leyburn's former cinema, The Elite, opened in 1928 and could seat 500; the premises were also used to stage theatre and music shows. It was initially closed in 2007, but was re-opened by volunteers under the name The Picture House. This revival however was short lived as the cinema shut down permanently in October 2008, less than 18 months after the first closure. A 64-seat cinema is now located within a multi-purpose venue named The Old School House, using the former St Peter and St Paul primary school building.

=== Media and filmography ===
The town is served by two local newspapers, North Yorkshire editions of the daily Northern Echo and the weekly Darlington & Stockton Times both published by Newsquest.

Local news and television programmes are provided by BBC North East and Cumbria and ITV Tyne Tees from the Bilsdale TV transmitter.

Local radio stations are BBC Radio York on 104.3 FM, Greatest Hits Radio Yorkshire on 107.1 FM and Dales Radio on 104.9 FM.

Leyburn has appeared in various television programmes including The Department Store: Milner's, on BBC Four in 2008, and the 1960s-set drama series Heartbeat.

=== Events ===
The Dales Festival of Food and Drink was initially set up in response to the severe economic fallout experienced by the area after the 2001 foot and mouth crisis. The first event was held in the market place on May Day bank holiday weekend in 2002, after an increase in publicity and popularity, the festival moved to a larger site on the outskirts of Leyburn, however the event moved back to the market place in 2017 after a decline in revenue. In 2019, after continuing to lose money, it was announced that the last festival was to be held in 2020, however as a result of cancellation owing to the COVID-19 pandemic, 2019 was the final event.

A 1940s weekend takes place at the end of July. Wensleydale agricultural show takes place on the third Saturday in August. Saturday 23 August 2014 marked the 100th Wensleydale Show. The local Rotary Club sponsors the Wensleydale Wander in March or April, organised walks of 12 miles (19 km) and 22 miles (35 km).

== Public services ==
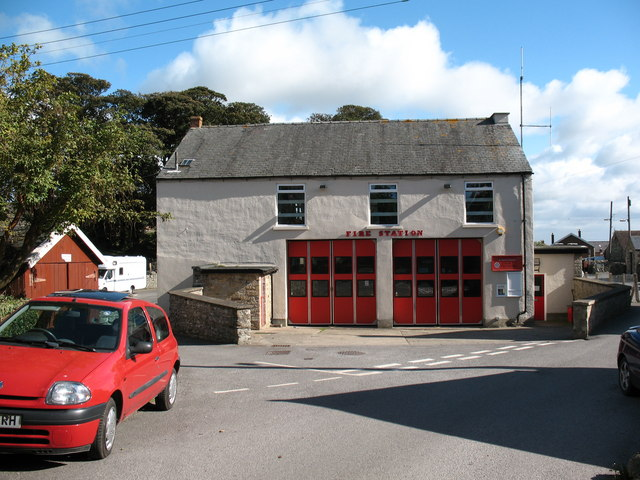
Leyburn Fire Station

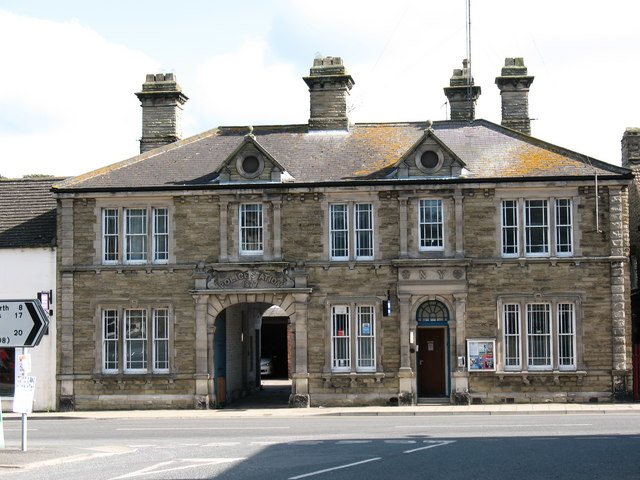
Leyburn Police Station

Leyburn Medical Practice is the town's general practice, the catchment area spans surrounding settlements including Middleham and rural Coverdale. The nearest NHS hospital is the Friarage Hospital in Northallerton, 19 miles (31 km) to the east, emergency ambulances are provided by the Yorkshire Ambulance Service, and the voluntary Yorkshire Air Ambulance. Leyburn's fire and police station is operated by North Yorkshire Fire and Rescue Service and the North Yorkshire Police service. The fire element is crewed solely by retained firefighters. The former Leyburn police station was built in 1878, and was vacated in 2021, when the two services amalgamated in the fire station. The proposal to co-locate was made by the former police and crime commissioner Julia Mulligan.

== Notable people ==
- Liam Darville, semi-professional footballer who plays as a defender for Richmond Town, was born in Leyburn in 1990.
- Leyburn is the home town of footballer Michael Dawson and his elder brother, Andy.
- George Gargrave, English mathematician, was born in Leyburn in 1710 where he was educated by his uncle, schoolmaster John Crow.
- George Bland Humble, headmaster in Marylebone London and Fremantle, Australia, was born in Leyburn Moor House in 1839.
- Charles Herbert Kitson, organist and influential music teacher, was born in Leyburn in 1874.

== See also ==
- Listed buildings in Leyburn
