= St Mary's Church, Redmire =

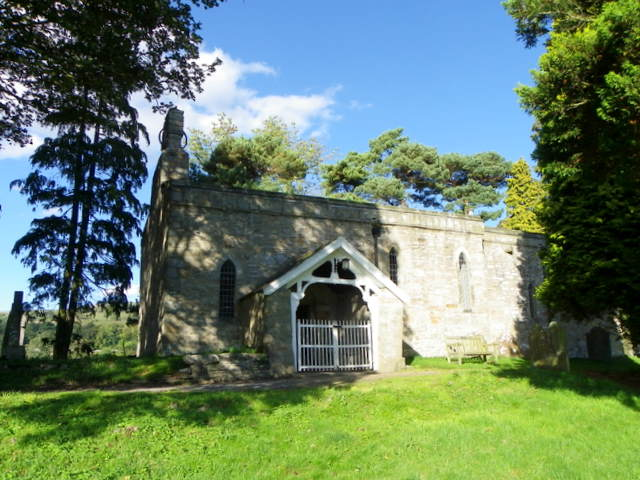
- St Mary's Church, Redmire
- St Mary's Church, Redmire
- 54°18′45″N 1°55′25.98″W
- OS grid reference: SE 05087 90800
- Location: Redmire
- Country: England
- Denomination: Church of England

History
- Dedication: St Mary the Virgin

Architecture
- Heritage designation: Grade II* listed

Administration
- Province: York
- Diocese: Leeds
- Archdeaconry: Richmond and Craven
- Deanery: Wensley
- Parish: Redmire

St Mary's Church, Redmire is a Grade II* listed parish church in the Church of England in Redmire, North Yorkshire.

== History ==
The church dates from the 12th century. The chancel roof was restored around 1895 and the nave roof, found to be infested with Deathwatch beetle, was restored in 1925.

The royal coat of arms dates from 1720.

== Architecture ==
It is built in stone, and consists of a nave, a south porch with a Welsh slate roof, a chancel, and a north vestry with a stone slate roof. On the west gable is a bellcote, and on the body of the church are quoins, parapets, and gargoyles. The south doorway is Norman, with one order of shafts with scalloped capitals, and chevrons in the arch.

== Parish status ==
The church is in a joint parish with:

- Thornton Rust Mission Room
- St Andrew's Church, Aysgarth
- St Oswald's Church, Castle Bolton
- Holy Trinity Church, Wensley
- St Margaret's Church, Preston-under-Scar
- St Bartholomew's Church, West Witton

== Memorials ==
- Thomas Other of Elm House (d. 1834) and Jane his wife (d. 1829), the eldest daughter of Edward Lister of Coverham Abbey
