= Listed buildings in West Witton =

West Witton is a civil parish in the county of North Yorkshire, England. It contains 39 listed buildings that are recorded in the National Heritage List for England. Of these, one is listed at Grade II*, the middle of the three grades, and the others are at Grade II, the lowest grade. The parish contains the village of West Witton, the hamlet of Swinithwaite, and the surrounding countryside. Most of the listed buildings are houses, cottages and associated structures, farmhouses and farm buildings, and the others include the ruins of preceptory, a church, a public house, a guide stone, a folly, a village hall and two mileposts.

== Key ==
Grade	Criteria
II*	Particularly important buildings of more than special interest
II	Buildings of national importance and special interest

== Buildings ==
Name and location	Photograph	Date	Notes	Grade
Penhill Preceptory; 54.29460°N 1.94670°W		c. 1200	The ruins of a preceptory of the Knights Templar. They are in stone with a rectangular plan, and the walls stand up to about 750 millimetres (30 in) in height. To the south are the bases for a doorway, and inside are the base for a stone altar and sanctuary step, coffins and grave covers.	II
St Bartholomew's Church; 54.29197°N 1.90773°W		16th century	The oldest part of the church is the tower, and the rest was rebuilt in 1875 by J. B. and W. Atkinson. It is built in stone with a stone slate roof, and consists of a nave, a north aisle, a south porch, a chancel with a north vestry and organ chamber, and a west tower. The tower has three stages, quoins, a two-light west window with a hood mould, a slit vent, clock faces, a string course, two-light bell openings with hood moulds, a gargoyle to the south, and an embattled parapet with corner pinnacles.	II
Old Hall; 54.29873°N 1.93375°W		1651	The house is in stone, with quoins, and a stone slate roof with shaped kneelers and stone coping. There are two storeys, two bays, and a projecting gabled porch on the right. The door on the main range has a chamfered quoined surround, and the windows are mullioned. The porch has an inner doorway with a basket arch, a chamfered quoined surround, and an initialled and dated lintel.	II
Manor Farmhouse; 54.29831°N 1.93723°W		1684	The farmhouse is in stone on a boulder plinth, and has a stone slate oof with shaped kneelers and stone coping. There are two storeys and five bays. The doorway has a quoined surround and an initialled and dated lintel. The windows are sashes with architraves, The windows on the left two bays are taller with keystones, those on the ground floor with relieving arches, and there is a fire window.	II
Middle Cottage; 54.29852°N 1.93549°W	—	1692	The house is in stone with a stone slate roof, and has two storeys and four bays. On the front is a doorway, the windows are sashes with double-chamfered surrounds, and there are two fire windows. On the upper floor is a plaque that has a border with bead moulding and inscribed with initials and the date.	II
Bolton Dene; 54.29167°N 1.91089°W	—	Late 17th to early 18th century	The house is in roughcast stone, and has a stone slate roof with shaped kneelers and stone coping. There are two storeys and three bays. The doorway has a chamfered surround on plinths, there is a single-light fire window, and the other windows are mullioned.	II
Catheral Hall and Catheral House; 54.29129°N 1.90785°W		Early 18th century	The spine and right cross-wing of an E-shaped house, the spine forming the Hall and the cross-wing the House. The building is in stone, the Hall has an artificial slate roof and the House has a stone sate roof. The Hall has two storeys and two bays, and a string course. The doorway has an eared architrave, to its right is a single-light window with a chamfered surround, and further to the right and on the upper floor are two-light mullioned windows. The House has two storeys and an attic, a boulder plinth, chambered quoins, a moulded floor band, and a coped gable with shaped kneeler. On the front are sash windows in architraves with a relieving arch over the ground floor. The right return is partly rendered, and contains single-light windows in architraves, and two oculi with keystones.	II
Chantry Farm Cottage; 54.29144°N 1.90760°W		Early 18th century	The house is in rendered stone, and has a stone slate roof and a shaped kneeler and stone coping on the right. There are two storeys and two bays. The central doorway has an architrave on plinths. To the right are four-light mullioned windows in architraves, and to the left are sash windows with stone lintels.	II
Fox and Hounds Inn; 54.29131°N 1.90761°W		Early 18th century	The public house originated as the left cross-wing of an E-shaped house. It is roughcast and has an artificial slate roof with shaped kneelers and stone coping. There are two storeys, and the gabled front facing the road has three bays. The doorway on the right bay has a stone surround and a keystone, and the windows are sashes, the window above the doorway horizontally sliding.	II
Guide stone 54.28431°N 1.9062691°W		Early 18th century	The guide stone is in sandstone and is about 500 millimetres (20 in) in height. It has a square shaft, a larger square head and a hole on the top surface. On the south side of the shaft is a benchmark. The head is inscribed on the east face with "Middleham" on the north face with "Askrigg", and on the west side with "Hawes".	II
West End Farmhouse; 54.29791°N 1.93773°W	—	Early 18th century	The farmhouse is in stone, partly roughcast, and has a stone slate roof with shaped kneelers and stone coping, and there are two storeys. The north front has two bays, and contains a doorway with an architrave, a pulvinated frieze and a cornice, and the windows are sashes with deep lintels. The south front has six bays and contains casement windows, some with mullions.	II
Ivydene; 54.29131°N 1.90595°W	—	Early to mid-18th century	The house is in roughcast stone on a plinth, with chamfered quoins, a floor band, and a two-span stone slate roof with shaped kneelers and stone copings. There are two storeys, a double depth plan, and four bays. The doorway has an architrave, a pulvinated frieze, and a cornice on consoles. The windows either have a single light, or are mullioned with three lights.	II
The Beacon; 54.29147°N 1.90720°W	—	Early to mid-18th century	The house is in roughcast stone, with stone dressings, quoins, and a stone slate roof with a shaped kneeler and stone coping on the left. There are two storeys and three bays. The central doorway has an architrave, a pulvinated frieze and a cornice, and the windows are sashes in architraves.	II
West Witton Pottery; 54.29142°N 1.90882°W		Early to mid-18th century	The house, at one time a pottery, is in painted stone, with quoins, and a stone slate roof with shaped kneelers and stone coping on the left. In the centre is a doorway with a stone surround, and to its right is a shop window. The other windows are sashes in stone surrounds.	II
Abbotsleigh; 54.29150°N 1.90491°W	—	Mid-18th century	The house is in stone, with quoins, and a stone slate roof with stone copings and shaped kneelers. There are two storeys and three bays. In the centre is a gabled porch, this is flanked by casement windows, and on the upper floor are sash windows.	II
Coach house west of Temple Farmhouse; 54.29642°N 1.95004°W		1761	The coach house, later used for other purposes, is in stone, with quoins, a stone slate roof with stone copings and shaped kneelers, and one storey. The east front has a coach opening with imposts and a fluted initialled and dated keystone. On the right return, facing the road, is a doorway with a frieze and a cornice. Above it is a blind round-arched tympanum with a fluted keystone, and in the gable are six pigeon holes.	II
Grassgill House; 54.29085°N 1.90552°W	—	1765	The house is roughcast, and has an artificial slate roof with shaped kneelers and stone coping. There are two storeys and two bays. The central doorway has an architrave, a pulvinated frieze, and a cornice on modillions. Above it is a decorated initialled and dated plaque, and the windows are sashes in architraves.	II
The Hollies East and West; 54.29119°N 1.90941°W	—	Mid to late 18th century	A house and a cottage in stone, with sandstone dressings, a stone slate roof, and two storeys. The house to the right has three bays, quoins, shaped kneelers and stone coping. The central doorway has an architrave, a frieze, and a cornice on consoles, and the windows are sashes in architraves. The cottage has one bay, and a hipped roof on the left. There are quoins on the left, a doorway with a plain surround, and a slab cornice on corbels, and there is a sash window in a plain surround.	II
Chantry House; 54.28799°N 1.91689°W	—	1766	The house is in stone, with quoins, the roof to the main part is in artificial slate, on the wing it is in stone slate, and it has shaped kneelers and stone coping. There are two storeys and a T-shaped plan, with a front range of four bays and a rear wing. On the front is a gabled porch, and doorway with a stone surround, and a lintel with a wavy top, inscribed initials and the date. The windows are sashes with stone surrounds, and at the rear is a round-headed landing window with imposts and a keystone.	II
Swinithwaite Hall; 54.29875°N 1.93142°W		1767	A country house that was extended in 1795. It is in stone, roughcast on the front and sides, with chamfered quoins, and hipped stone slate roofs. There are two storeys and an H-shaped plan, with two storeys and five bays. The outer bays of the front project as wings, and there is a floor band. The central doorway has an architrave, a pulvinated frieze, and a pediment on consoles, and the windows are sashes in architraves. The middle bay of the garden front projects slightly under a pedimened gable. It contains a Tuscan doorcase with a pediment, and a doorway with an architrave, and above it is a Tuscan Venetian window, and a moulded cornice.	II*
Gates, railings, walls and gate piers, South Lodge, Bolton Estate; 54.29626°N 1.88558°W		Late 18th century	The gate piers flanking the entrance are in stone, with chamfered rustication, necking, cornices and ball finials. Outside them are low coped walls with wrought iron railings, ending in square piers with stone capping. The gates are also in wrought iron; the gates and railings have spear finials.	II
Grassgill Farmhouse; 54.29129°N 1.90622°W	—	Late 18th century	The house is in stone, with quoins, and a stone slate roof with a shaped kneeler and stone coping on the left. There are two storeys and two bays. The central doorway has a stone surround with splayed bases, a pulvinated frieze and a cornice. The windows are sashes, and to the right are two blocked fire windows.	II
Holme Farm; 54.28833°N 1.91846°W	—	Late 18th century	The farmhouse is in rendered stone, and has a stone slate roof with kneelers and stone copings. There are two storeys and three bays. The central doorway has a stone surround, a pulvinated frieze and a cornice. The windows are sashes in plain stone surrounds.	II
Kingston House; 54.29138°N 1.90979°W	—	Late 18th century	The house is in stone, and has a stone slate roof with a kneeler and stone coping on the left. There are two storeys and four bays. The doorway on the third bay has a stone surround, on the left bay is a wide doorway with a segmental arch of voussoirs, and the windows are sashes.	II
Rubbing House; 54.28309°N 1.88150°W		Late 18th century	The building was used for rubbing down horses after exercise. It is in stone with a stone slate roof. There is a single storey and four bays; the fifth bay has collapsed. On the front are four door openings, and inside each room is an iron ring.	II
Smothits; 54.29128°N 1.90827°W	—	Late 18th century	The house is roughcast, and has a stone slate roof with shaped kneelers and stone copings. There are two storeys and four bays. The doorway has a stone surround on splayed bases and a fanlight, on the right bay are garage doors, and the windows are casements, most in architraves.	II
Rear wing, Swinithwaite Hall; 54.29897°N 1.93167°W		Late 18th century	The servants' wing, later a cottage and a store, is in stone, partly roughcast, and has a stone slate roof with a shaped kneelers and stone coping on the left. There are two storeys and four bays. The doorway has a chamfered quoined surround, and the windows are a mix of sashes and casements.	II
Temple Farmhouse; 54.29641°N 1.94973°W	—	Late 18th century	The farmhouse, which incorporates earlier features, has been divided into two dwellings. It is in stone, partly rendered, and has a stone slate roof. There are two storeys and three bays, and a projecting single-bay cross-wing on the left. The doorway on the front has an eared architrave, a pulvinated frieze and a modillion pediment. At the rear is a doorway with a chamfered surround, and a segmental-headed cellar opening. The windows are a mix, and include sashes, casements and mullioned window. On a lean-to at the east end is a doorway over which is a re-set inscribed, initialled and dated plaque.	II
The Old Vicarage; 54.29131°N 1.90432°W	—	Late 18th century	The house is in rendered stone, with a stone slate roof, kneelers, and stone coping. There are two storeys and a T-shaped plan, with four bays and a rear range. On the second bay is a doorway with a stone surround and splayed bases, an inscribed and dated lintel, a pulvinated frieze and a cornice. The right bay contains a canted bay window, and the other windows are sashes in stone surrounds.	II
Belvedere; 54.29652°N 1.95198°W		1792	A folly in sandstone on a plinth, with a lead roof. It has an octagonal plan, and the ground floor has vermiculated rustication. This contains round-arched recesses, one with a doorway, another with a sash window over a date, and the others blind. Above is a parapet with balustraded panels, and over the door is a statue of a talbot. The upper floor is recessed, and contains round-arched panels, above which is a modillion cornice, a blocking course, and a shallow dome.	II
Barn north of Swinithwaite Hall; 54.29965°N 1.93183°W		c. 1800	The barn is in stone, with chamfered quoins and a hipped stone slate roof. There are two storeys and three bays, the middle three bays projecting slightly. On the ground floor are two elliptical-arched barn openings with keystones, and three round-arched recesses under wedge lintels, and all have impost bands. On the upper floor are square openings with cambered lintels.	II
Coach house north of Swinithwaite Hall; 54.29932°N 1.93188°W	—	c. 1800	The coach house and stables are in stone, with quoins, a floor band, and hipped stone slate roofs. There are two storeys and six bays, the middle two bays projecting under a gable with a cornice containing a circular dovecote with a stone surround and a keystone. The ground floor contains two elliptical-arched coach entrances, openings with segmental-arched lintels, and stable doors, and on the upper floor are a pitching door and hayloft openings.	II
Barn opposite Temple Farmhouse; 54.29676°N 1.95018°W		c. 1800	The barn is in stone, with quoins and hipped stone slate roofs. It consists of a central block with two storeys, and flanking ranges with one storey and a loft. There are two barn openings with elliptical heads and keystones, other openings, some with segmental heads, vents, and three lunette windows.	II
Green Farm; 54.29823°N 1.93475°W	—	Early 19th century	The house is in stone with quoins and a coped stone slate roof. There are two storeys, a double depth plan, and three bays. On the front is a doorway, the windows are horizontally sliding sashes, and in the right bay is a cart shed.	II
Chantry Farmhouse; 54.29144°N 1.90776°W		Early to mid-19th century	The house is rendered, and has a stone slate roof with kneelers and stone copings. There are two storeys and two bays. On the right is a doorway with a stone surround, a pulvinated frieze and a cornice, and the windows are sashes with stone lintels.	II
Sunniside; 54.29149°N 1.90582°W	—	Early to mid-19th century	The house is in roughcast stone, with quoins, and a stone slate roof with stone coping on the left. There are two storeys and three bays. The central doorway has a stone surround and a fanlight, and the windows are sashes in stone surrounds.	II
Village Hall; 54.29212°N 1.90866°W		1868	A Sunday school, later a village hall, it is in stone, with quoins, and a stone slate roof with copings. There is one storey and four bays. The left bay contains a porch, and a doorway with a chamfered surround, a pointed arch and a hood mould, and to its left is a small trefoil-headed window. The other bays contain two-light trefoil-headed windows, and on the left gable is a bellcote.	II
Mile Post south of West Witton School; 54.29128°N 1.91245°W		Late 19th century	The milepost on the north side of Main Street (A684 road) is in cast iron, it has a triangular plan, and is about 600 millimetres (24 in) in height. The top is inscribed with "LEYBURN H.D.", on each face is a pointing hand, on the left face is the distance to Leyburn, and on the right face the distance to Hawes.	II
Mile Post on Temple Bank; 54.29631°N 1.95397°W		Late 19th century	The milepost on the north side of Main Street (A684 road) is in cast iron, it has a triangular plan, and is about 600 millimetres (24 in) in height. The top is inscribed with "LEYBURN H.D.", on each face is a pointing hand, on the left face is the distance to Leyburn, and on the right face the distance to Hawes.	II
