= St Oswald's Church, Castle Bolton =

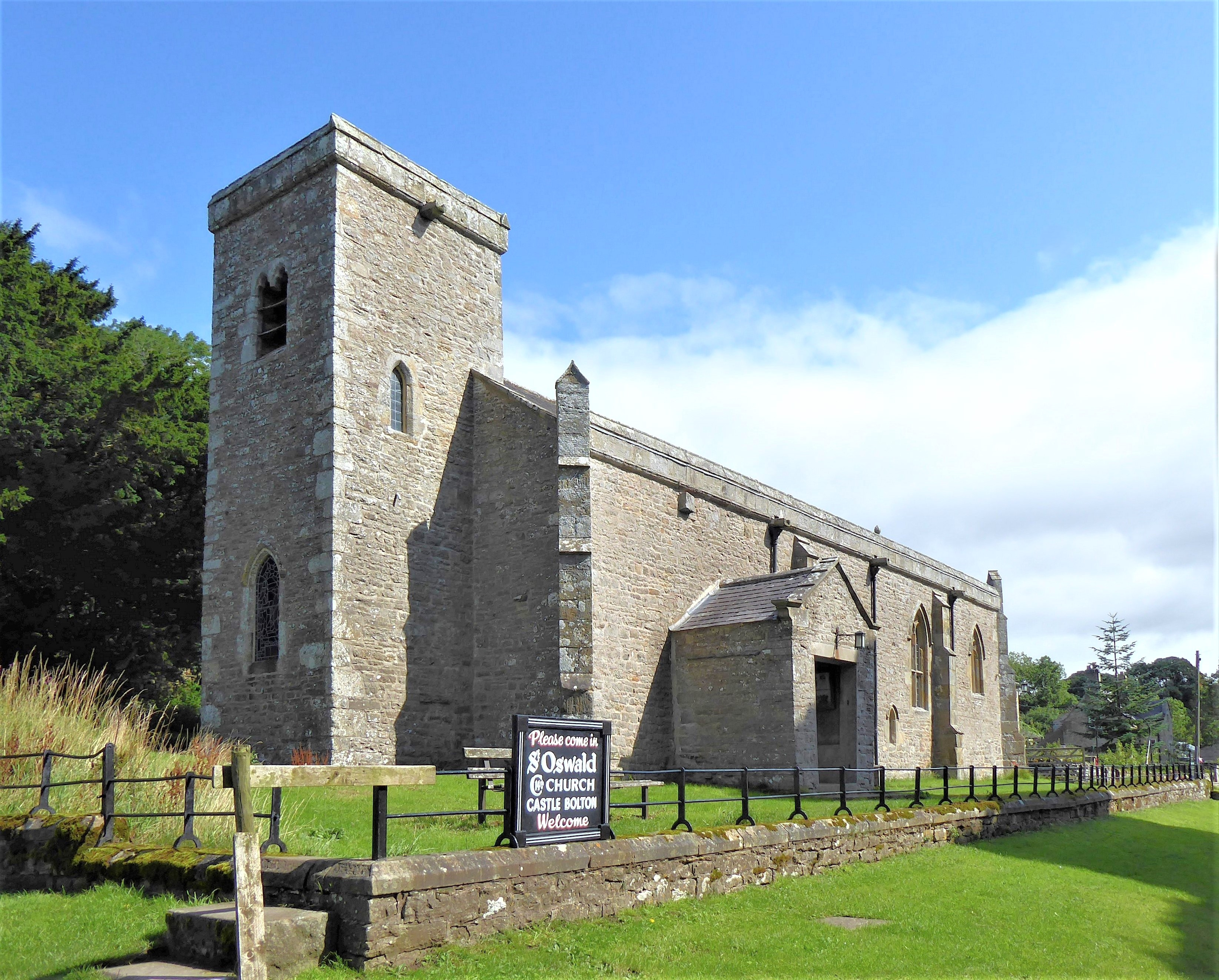
- St Oswald's Church, Castle Bolton
- St Oswald's Church, Castle Bolton
- 54°19′18.38″N 1°57′2.77″W
- OS grid reference: SE 03364 91875
- Location: Castle Bolton
- Country: England
- Denomination: Church of England

History
- Dedication: St Oswald

Architecture
- Heritage designation: Grade II* listed

Administration
- Province: York
- Diocese: Leeds
- Archdeaconry: Richmond and Craven
- Deanery: Wensley
- Parish: Castle Bolton

St Oswald's Church, Castle Bolton is a Grade II* listed parish church in the Church of England located in Castle Bolton, North Yorkshire.

== History ==
The church dates from the 14th century. The south aisle was rebuilt around 1770 and the church restored in 1853.

It is the burial place of the Metcalfe family.

== Parish status ==
The church is in a joint parish with

- Thornton Rust Mission Room
- St Andrew's Church, Aysgarth
- St Mary's Church, Redmire
- Holy Trinity Church, Wensley
- St Margaret's Church, Preston-under-Scar
- St Bartholomew's Church, West Witton

== See also ==
- Grade II* listed churches in North Yorkshire (district)
- Listed buildings in Castle Bolton with East and West Bolton
