= John James (antiquary) =

English antiquarian

- Born: 1811; Wensleydale, Yorkshire, England
- Died: 1867 (aged 55–56); Nether Edge, Sheffield, England
- Occupation: Antiquarian

John James (1811–1867) was an English antiquarian.

== Biography ==
James was born of humble parents at West Witton, Wensleydale, Yorkshire, on 22 Jan. 1811. After receiving a very scanty education, and working at a lime-kiln, he became clerk, first to Ottiwell Tomlin, solicitor, of Richmond, Yorkshire, and afterwards to a Bradford solicitor named Tolson. He had spent all his leisure in study, and Tolson encouraged him to compile ‘The History and Topography of Bradford,’ 8vo, 1841, of which a ‘continuation and additions’ appeared in 1866. After Tolson's death James forsook the law for journalism and antiquarian research. He became the local correspondent at Bradford of the ‘Leeds Times’ and ‘York Courant,’ and furnished articles on the Exhibition to the ‘Bradford Observer’ in 1862. To an edition of the ‘Poems’ of John Nicholson, the Airedale poet, published in 1844 (reissued in 1876), he prefixed an appreciative memoir. In 1857 he published a valuable ‘History of the Worsted Manufacture in England from the Earliest Times,’ and at the meeting of the British Association held at Leeds in September 1858 he read a paper on the ‘Worsted Manufactures of Yorkshire’ (Report, xxviii. pt. ii. pp. 182–3). In 1860, he published a lecture on ‘The Philosophy of Lord Bacon and the Systems which preceded it;’ and in 1861 edited for the benefit of the widow the ‘Lyrical and other Minor Poems’ of his old friend Robert Story, with a sketch of his life. In October 1863 his paper ‘On the Little British Kingdom of Elmet and the Region of Loidis’ was communicated to the British Archæological Association, then at Leeds (Journal, xx. 34–8). For the eighth edition of the ‘Encyclopædia Britannica’ he wrote the article on ‘Yorkshire.’ James died on 4 July 1867 at Nether Edge, near Sheffield, and was buried on the 8th at West Witton. On 18 December 1856 he was elected F.S.A.
