= Temple Folly =

Building in West Witton, North Yorkshire, England

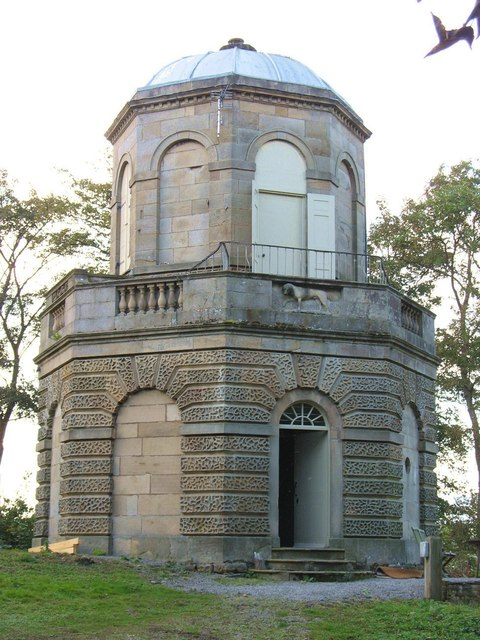
- The building in 2009

- Location within North Yorkshire

General information
- Status: Converted to residential
- Type: Belvedere
- Location: West Witton, North Yorkshire, England
- Coordinates: 54°17′47″N 1°57′07″W
- Year built: 1792
- Client: T. J. Anderson

Design and construction
- Architect: John Foss

Listed Building – Grade II
- Official name: Belvedere
- Designated: 13 February 1967
- Reference no.: 1179599

Temple Folly is a historic building near West Witton, a village in North Yorkshire, England.

The belvedere was commissioned by T. J. Anderson, who lived at Swinithwaite Hall. It was designed by John Foss, and was completed in 1792. The building was Grade II listed in 1967. It has been converted into a holiday let.

The folly is built of sandstone on a plinth, with a lead roof. It has an octagonal plan, and the ground floor has vermiculated rustication. This contains round-arched recesses, one with a doorway, another with a sash window over a date, and the others blind. Above is a parapet with balustraded panels, and over the door is a statue of a talbot. The upper floor is recessed, and contains round-arched panels, above which is a modillion cornice, a blocking course, and a shallow dome. Inside, the upper floor has neoclassical plasterwork.

== See also ==
- Listed buildings in West Witton
