= St Andrew's Church, Aysgarth =

Grade II* listed church in England

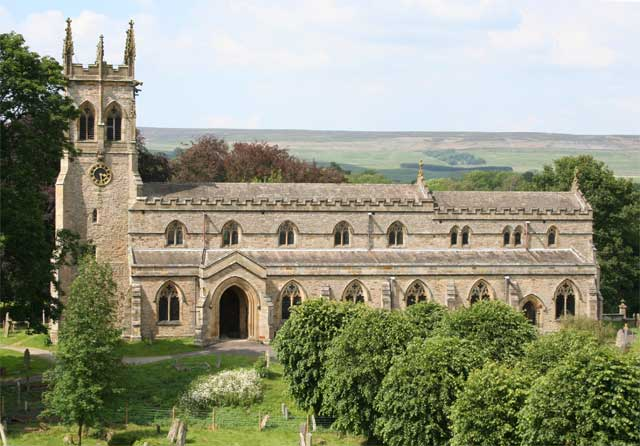
- St Andrew's Church, Aysgarth
- St Andrew's Church, Aysgarth
- 54°17′31.64″N 1°58′59.04″W
- OS grid reference: SE 01195 88534
- Location: Aysgarth
- Country: England
- Denomination: Church of England

History
- Dedication: St Andrew

Architecture
- Heritage designation: Grade II* listed

Administration
- Province: York
- Diocese: Leeds
- Archdeaconry: Richmond and Craven
- Deanery: Wensley
- Parish: Aysgarth

St Andrew's Church, Aysgarth, is a Grade II* listed parish church in the Church of England in Aysgarth, North Yorkshire. It is located on the south side of the River Ure.

== History ==
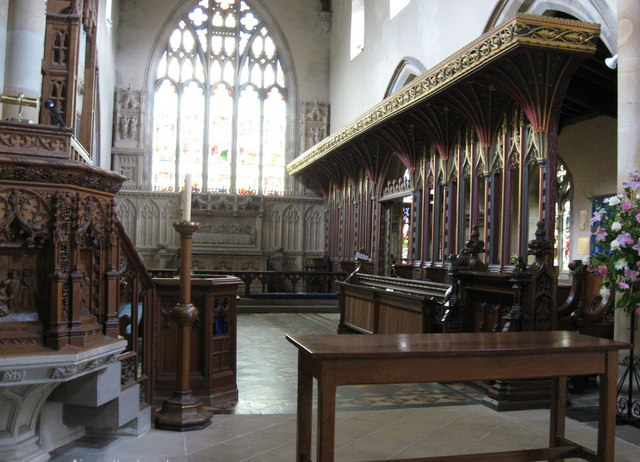
The screen from Jervaulx Abbey

The church is medieval but was substantially rebuilt in 1536 and again in 1866 by James Green of Todmorden at a cost of £3,600. The roof and walls were in such a ruinous condition as well as the original arches and piers of the nave, that they could not be preserved, and so the whole church, with the exception of the lower portion of the tower was rebuilt. The clerestory was raised 3 feet (0.91 m) and pierced by six windows on each side, filled with geometric tracery. The east window illustrating the life of the Saviour was made by Clayton and Bell, the gift of H.T. Robinson of Edgley, Leyburn.

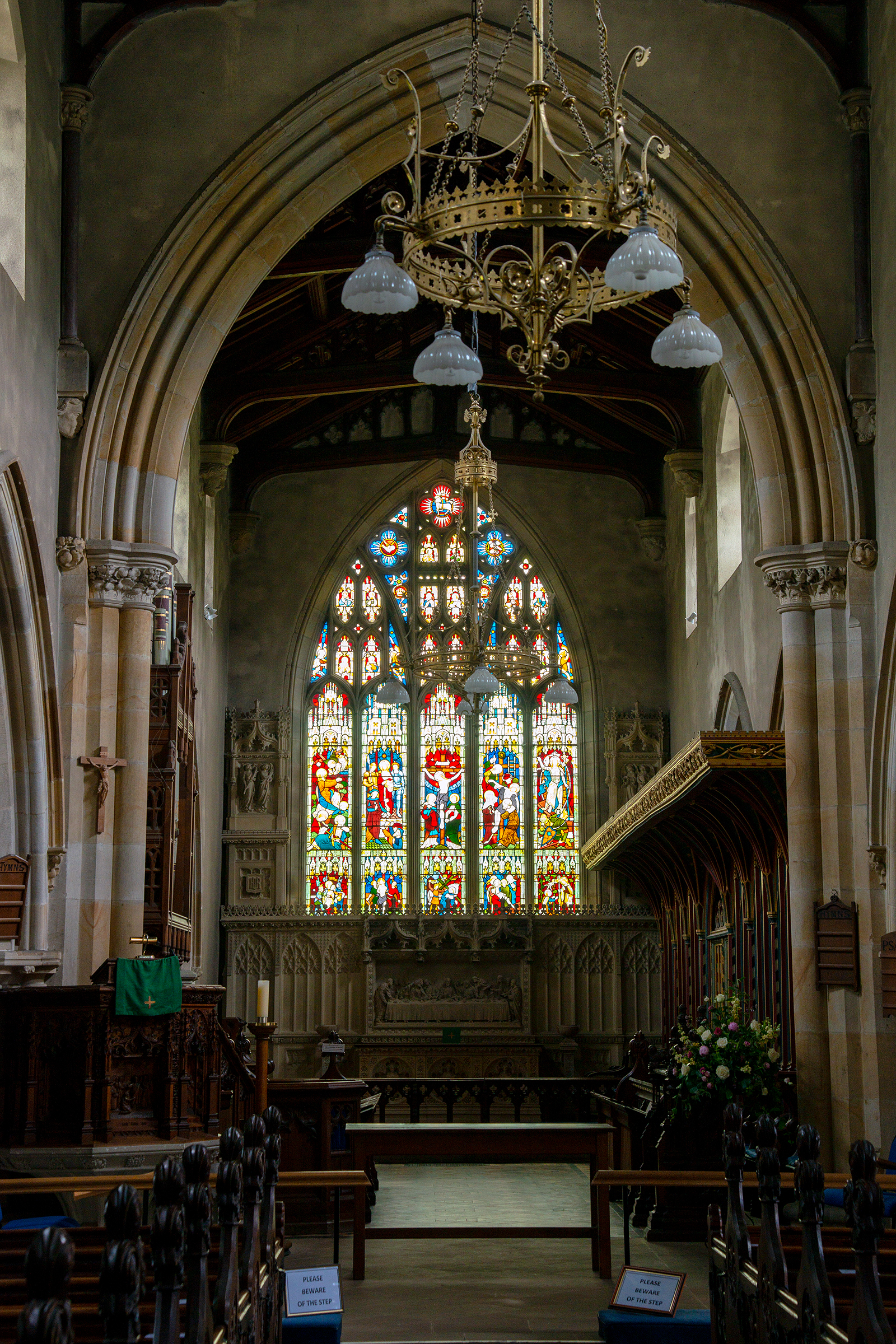
Facing the altar, St Andrews

It was re-opened on 28 August 1866 by the Bishop of Ripon.

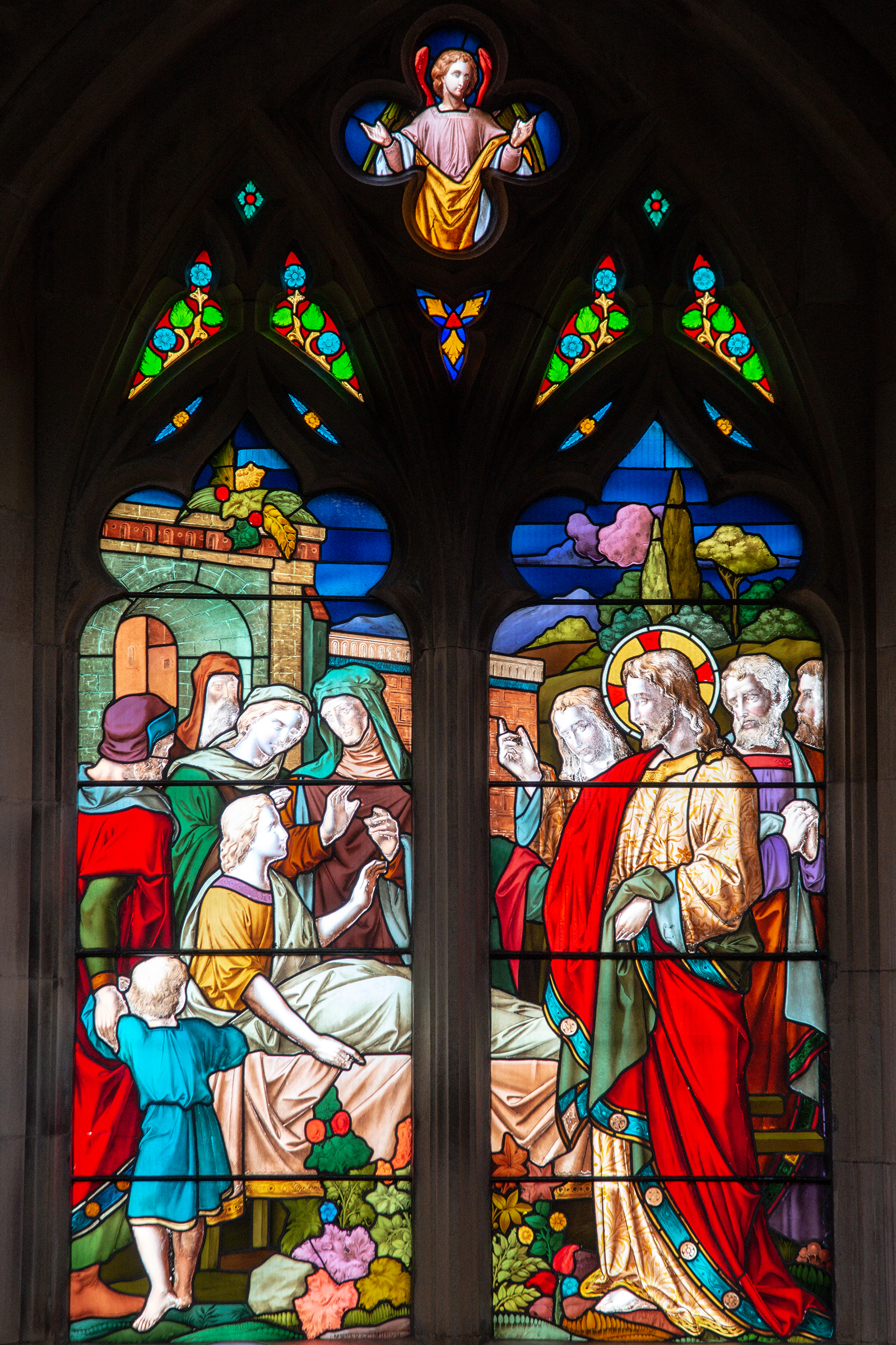
One of the colourful stained glass windows

The church is noted for its fine rood screen dating from around 1506 which was originally installed in Jervaulx Abbey and moved here after the Dissolution of the monasteries. After monasteries were dissolved in the 16th century, the church became a haven for some of the monks.

A Saxon Cross was stolen from the church in 1966.

The burial ground contains over a thousand gravestones.

== Parish status ==
The church is in a joint parish with:

- Thornton Rust Mission Room
- St Oswald's Church, Castle Bolton
- St Mary's Church, Redmire
- Holy Trinity Church, Wensley
- St Margaret's Church, Preston-under-Scar
- St Bartholomew's Church, West Witton

== Organ ==
A pipe organ was built for £600 by Isaac Abbot of Leeds with a case carved by J.H. Thorp of Leeds from a design by J.M. Bottomley of Middlesbrough. It was opened in August 1880. A specification of the organ can be found on the National Pipe Organ Register.

== See also ==
- Grade II* listed churches in North Yorkshire (district)
- Listed buildings in Aysgarth
