= Penhill (disambiguation) =

Penhill is a prominent hill in the Pennines, North Yorkshire, England

Penhill may also refer to:

- Penhill, a neighbourhood and administrative area of Swindon, Wiltshire, England
- Penhill, London, a neighbourhood in Bexley, London, forming part of the Blendon and Penhill ward
- Penhill (horse), a British-bred racehorse best known for his achievements in National Hunt racing
- Penhill F.C., former association football club from Penhill, Swindon, Wiltshire, England
- Penhill Giant, a giant found in English folklore and legends
- Penhill Preceptory, a former priory on the northern flanks of Penhill in Wensleydale, North Yorkshire, England
- Pen Hill, a hill in the Mendip Hills in Somerset, England
- Penn Hill, Dorset
  - Penn Hill (ward)
- Penn Hills, Pennsylvania
