= St Bartholomew's Church, West Witton =

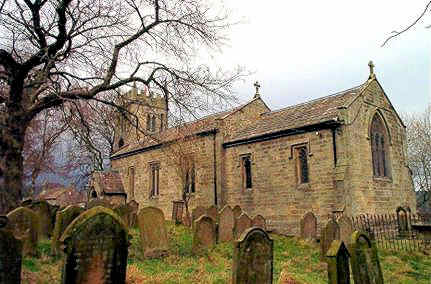
- St Bartholomew's Church, West Witton
- St Bartholomew's Church, West Witton
- 54°17′28.28″N 1°54′28.04″W
- OS grid reference: SE 06106 88485
- Location: West Witton, North Yorkshire
- Country: England
- Denomination: Church of England

History
- Dedication: St Bartholomew

Architecture
- Heritage designation: Grade II listed

Administration
- Province: York
- Diocese: Leeds
- Archdeaconry: Richmond and Craven
- Deanery: Wensley
- Parish: West Witton

St Bartholomew's Church, West Witton is a Grade II listed parish church in the Church of England in West Witton, North Yorkshire.

== History ==
The tower of the church dates from the 16th century. The rest was rebuilt in 1875 by John Bownas and William Atkinson, the cost of £1,100 (equivalent to £110,000 in 2025) paid for by Lord Bolton. The contractors were Messrs. Mawer and Pearson. It was re-opened by the Bishop of Ripon on 18 August 1875.

St Bartholomew's was featured in the British television series All Creatures Great and Small, in the episode "Cats & Dogs".

== Parish status ==
The church is in a joint parish with

- Thornton Rust Mission Room
- St Andrew's Church, Aysgarth
- St Oswald's Church, Castle Bolton
- St Mary's Church, Redmire
- St Margaret's Church, Preston-under-Scar
- Holy Trinity Church, Wensley

== Organ ==
A pipe organ was built by W. M. Hedgeland. A specification of the organ can be found on the National Pipe Organ Register.

== See also ==
- Listed buildings in West Witton
