= Swinithwaite =

Hamlet in North Yorkshire, England

Coordinates: 54°17′56″N 1°56′01″W

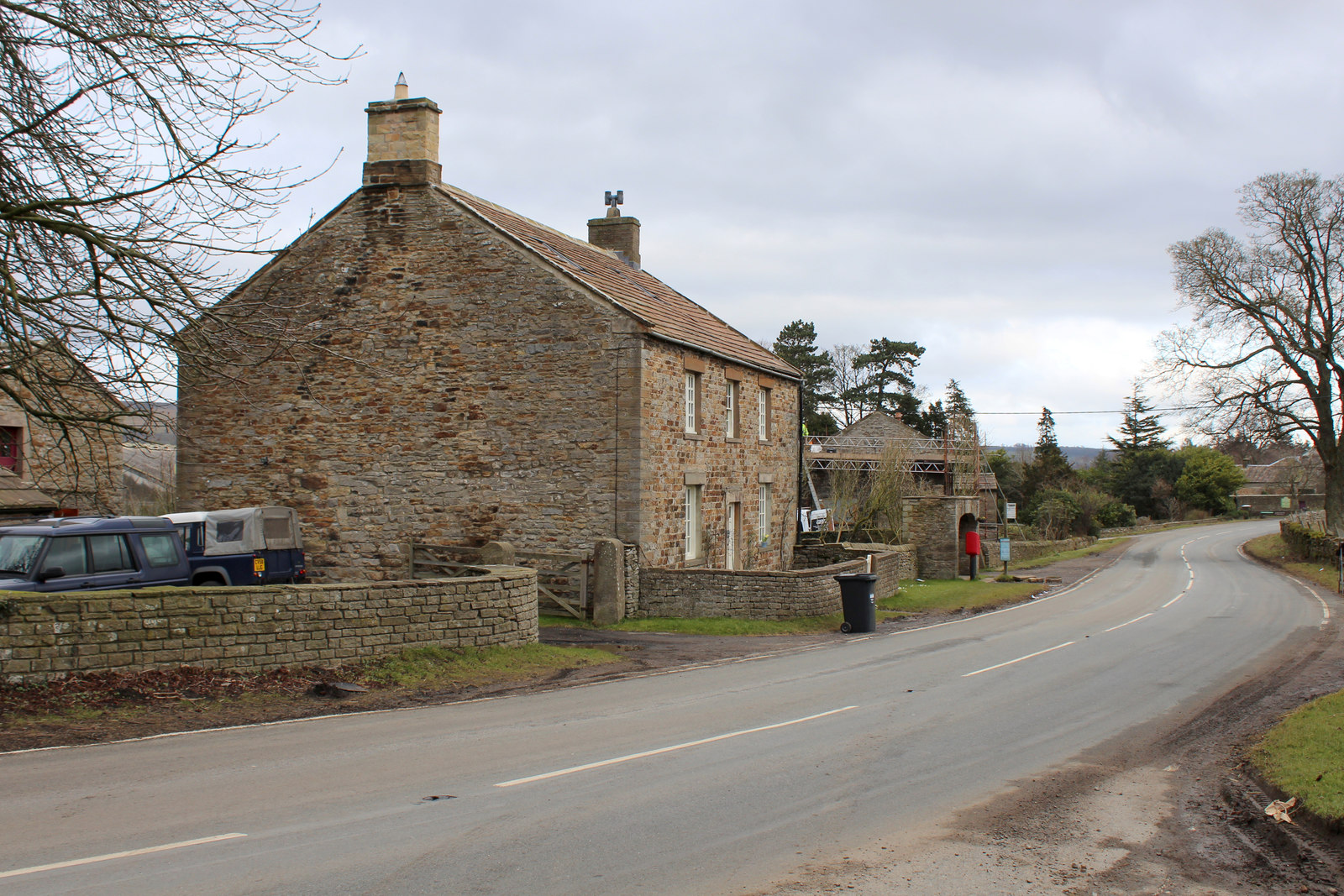
- A684 road passing through Swinithwaite

- Location within North Yorkshire
- OS grid reference: SE046889
- Civil parish: West Witton
- Unitary authority: North Yorkshire
- Ceremonial county: North Yorkshire
- Region: Yorkshire and the Humber
- Country: England
- Sovereign state: United Kingdom
- Post town: Leyburn
- Police: North Yorkshire
- Fire: North Yorkshire
- Ambulance: Yorkshire

Swinithwaite is a hamlet in the Yorkshire Dales, North Yorkshire, England. It lies on the A684 road, 2 miles (3.2 km) east of Aysgarth. From 1974 to 2023 it was part of the district of Richmondshire. It is now administered by the unitary North Yorkshire Council.

The hamlet originally belonged to the Knights Templar but was later absorbed into the manor of West Witton, which lies to the east. The hamlet includes Swinithwaite Hall, a grade II* listed building which has extensive grounds covering over 1,600 acres (650 ha). Temple Folly is a belvedere in the grounds, designed by John Foss of Richmond and converted into holiday accommodation. The hamlet does not have any amenities other than a farm shop.

The cellar in the farmhouse on the estate was once used for a scene in All Creatures Great and Small.

In one of Bernard Cornwell's Saxon stories, The Last Kingdom, the village Synningthwait is referenced. In that book, it claims the name means "place cleared by fire", after parts of it were torched to make room for more homes for the Danes.
