= Listed buildings in Ledsham, West Yorkshire =

Ledsham is a civil parish in the metropolitan borough of the City of Leeds, West Yorkshire, England. The parish contains twelve listed buildings that are recorded in the National Heritage List for England. Of these, two are listed at Grade I, the highest of the three grades, and the others are at Grade II, the lowest grade. The parish contains the village of Ledsham and the surrounding countryside. Most of the listed buildings are in the village, and consist of houses and farmhouses, almshouses, a former orphanage, a former school, a church, a former vicarage with a walled garden, and a telephone kiosk. Outside the village, to the north is a former hunting lodge, and to the south are the ruins of a manor house.

== Key ==
Grade	Criteria
I	Buildings of exceptional interest, sometimes considered to be internationally important
II	Buildings of national importance and special interest

== Buildings ==
Name and location	Photograph	Date	Notes	Grade
All Saints Church; 53.76232°N 1.30909°W		7th century	The base of the tower is Saxon, and the tower was raised in the 11th and 12th centuries. There were later additions and alterations to the church, and it was restored in 1871. The church is built in magnesian limestone with a stone slate roof, and consists of a nave, a north aisle, a south porch, a chancel with a north chapel, and a west steeple. The steeple has a tower without buttresses, containing a round-headed Saxon doorway that has projecting imposts decorated in interlacing, and surrounded by a band with a carved vine scroll. To the right of the doorway are two small round windows, and on the south front is a clock face. At the top of the tower is a corbel table, corner gargoyles, an embattled parapet with crocketed corner pinnacles, and an octagonal spire.	I
Remains of Newton Abbey at SE 444 277; 53.74457°N 1.32744°W		Medieval	The building was a moated manor house, now on an island caused by mining subsidence. Only a few courses of masonry have survived.	II
Hill Top Farmhouse; 53.76162°N 1.31177°W	—	17th century (possible)	A house in magnesian limestone on a plinth with chamfered coping, with quoins and a stone slate roof. There are two storeys and a T-shaped plan. On the front facing the road is a doorway with a four-centred arched head, and the windows in the house are mullioned with hood moulds.	II
Ledston Lodge; 53.77257°N 1.31852°W		Mid 17th century	A hunting lodge, later a private house, it is in magnesian limestone with a lead roof, and consists of a main block and wings to the north and the west. The main block has two storeys and attics, and a symmetrical square plan with three bays on each front. It has a plinth, a band, a string course, a plain frieze, a moulded cornice, and an embattled parapet. At each corner is a turret with an ogee cap and a ball finial. The doorway has a depressed arch, an architrave, a keystone carved with a hunting horn, and an entablature with consoles, above which is a cartouche. The windows are cross windows, and at the northwest corner is a stair turret containing a spiral staircase.	I
Sir John Lewis's Cottages; 53.76278°N 1.30894°W		Mid 17th century	A row of eleven almshouses in magnesian limestone on a plinth, with a string course, and a stone slate roof with coped gables and kneelers. There are two storeys, and each house has one bay. Most of the doorways are paired and have chamfered surrounds, and the windows are mullioned with two lights.	II
Manor House Farmhouse; 53.76170°N 1.30784°W		Late 17th century	A manor house, later a farmhouse, it is in magnesian limestone on a plinth, with quoins and a stone slate roof. There are two storeys, attics and cellars, a three-bay main range, a rear gabled three-storey stair turret, and a later rear wing in the angle. Five steps lead up the a doorway with a fanlight, and the windows are mullioned and transomed.	II
The Orphanage, wall and gatepiers 53.76247°N 1.30835°W		1721	An orphanage, later converted for residential use, it is in magnesian limestone and has a stone slate roof with coped gables and moulded kneelers. There are three storeys and a T-shaped plan, with a main range of seven bays, and a stair turret and a later addition at the rear. The central doorway has a moulded architrave and a cornice, and the windows are cross windows. At the rear, the gabled stair turret contains a similar doorway. Attached to the house are high walls, and at the front of the garden is a low wall with railings, in the middle of which are gate piers with moulded caps and ball finials, and iron gates.	II
School House; 53.76239°N 1.30686°W		Early 18th century	A school and master's house, later two dwellings, the building is in magnesian limestone, and has a tile roof with coped gables and moulded kneelers. There are two parts; the right part was the house, it has two storeys and five bays, and contains a doorway with a fanlight and sash windows. The former school to the left has three storeys and three bays, and the windows vary; some are sashes, some are sliding sashes, and others are casements.	II
The Old Vicarage and stables 53.76514°N 1.31299°W	—	1821	The vicarage, later a private house, is in sandstone and magnesian limestone with a hipped slate roof. There are two storeys and an L-shaped plan, with a main range of five bays, and a rear service wing. In the centre of the front is a Greek Doric tetrastyle porch with a pediment, and double doors with a fanlight. The windows are sashes with splayed voussoirs, those in the ground floor with aprons. The left return has three bays, and round-headed arches, one containing a French window, and extending from it is a screen wall. From the right return extends the service wing, and beyond that is a former coach house, later a garage, with an elliptical-headed coach entrance. At the end of the rear courtyard is a single-storey stable with stable doors, windows, and mounting steps.	II
Walled garden with ha-ha, The Old Vicarage; 53.76550°N 1.31280°W	—	Early 19th century	The walled garden to the northeast of the house is square with sides of about 75 metres (246 ft). On the southeast side is a ha-ha and the other sides have walls about 3 metres (9.8 ft) high. The ha-ha is in magnesian limestone with rounded coping, ramped up at the ends. The walls are in magnesian limestone with brick lining on the inner sides, and flat coping. In the centre of each wall is a round-headed gateway.	II
Old School; 53.76245°N 1.30656°W		c. 1870	The former school is in limestone with quoins, and stone slate roofs with coping gables, kneelers and a cross finial. There is one storey over a deep basement, a single gabled bay facing the road, and a range extending to the rear. On the front is a basement doorway and a lancet window, both with a segmental head, and an external staircase to the left. Above is a four-light mullioned and transomed window, and a quatrefoil in the gable. On the left is a square corbelled-out bellcote with four-centred arched bell openings, an embattled parapet, and a square dome with a finial.	II
Telephone kiosk 53.76226°N 1.31079°W		1935	The telephone kiosk is of the K6 type, designed by Giles Gilbert Scott. Constructed in cast iron with a square plan and a dome, it has unperforated crowns in the top panels.	II
