= Church of All Saints, Ledsham =

Anglican church in West Yorkshire, England

- All Saints Ledsham
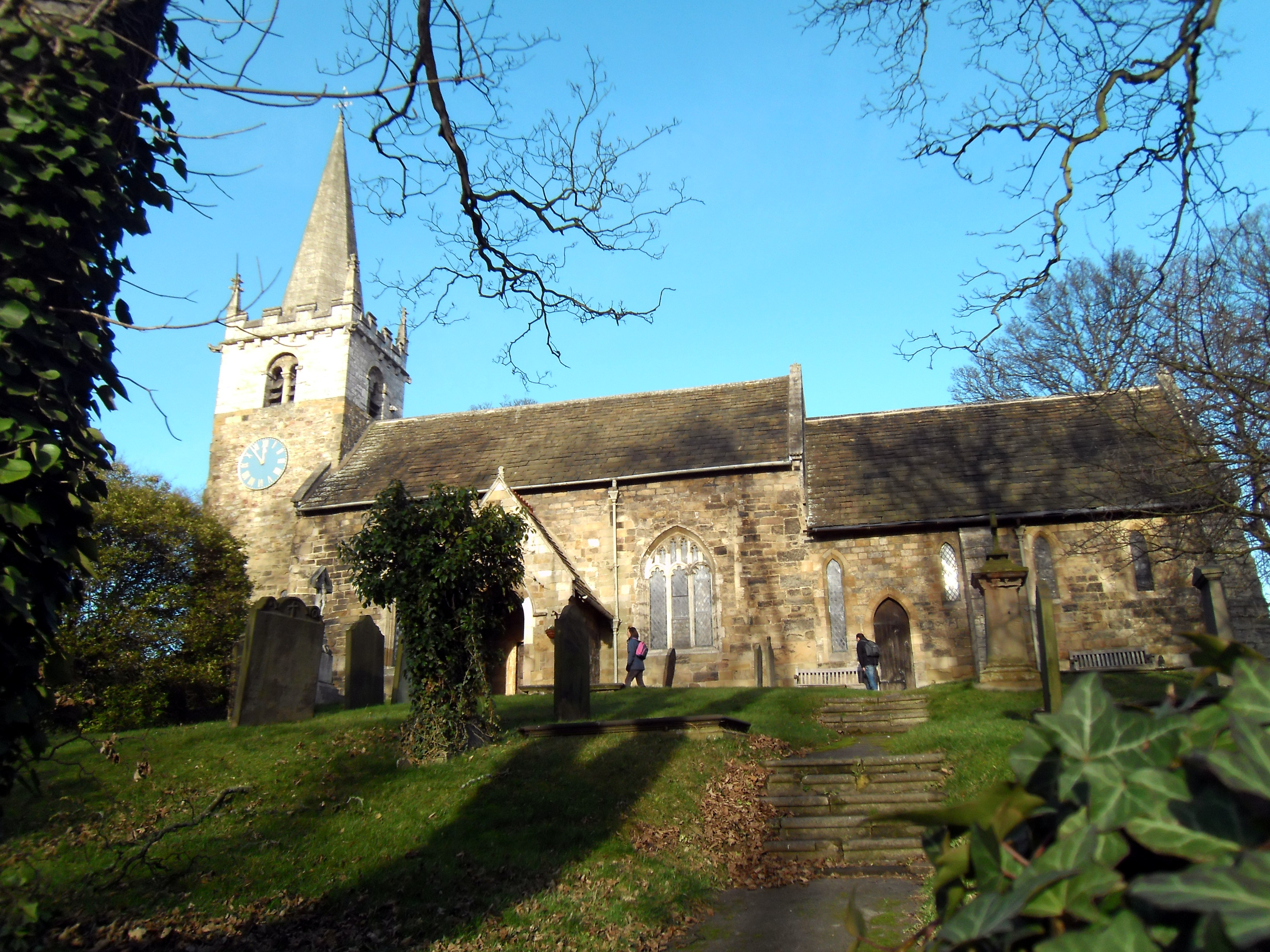
- All Saints Church Ledsham
- Church of All Saints, Ledsham
- 53.762°N 1.309°W
- OS grid reference: SE 45650 29774
- Location: Ledsham
- Country: England
- Denomination: Anglican

History
- Status: Parish church
- Founded: c. 700

Architecture
- Functional status: Active

Administration
- Diocese: York
- Archdeaconry: York
- Deanery: Selby
- Benefice: Ledsham with Fairburn
- Parish: Ledsham with Fairburn

Listed Building – Grade I
- Designated: 3 February 1967
- Reference no.: 1237404

The Church of All Saints is an Anglican building in the village of Ledsham, West Yorkshire, England, some 10 miles (16 km) east of Leeds. Parts of the church are originally from the Anglo-Saxon period, which has been the basis of the claim that it is the oldest church still standing within West Yorkshire, and one of the county's oldest buildings. Although Yorkshire has several Anglo-Saxon structures, the church is noted as a rare survivor despite several renovations. In his book, England's Thousand Best Churches, Simon Jenkins rates it with two stars out five, and it is one of only nine recommended for West Yorkshire.

== History ==
A church is thought to have existed in Ledsham before the Norman Conquest, and elements of the present parish church have been dated to Anglo-Saxon times. The stone used in the fabric of the church is a combination of Thornhill Rock Sandstone and Dolomitic Limestone, both of which were quarried locally. At the time of the Domesday survey the church was in the hands of the de Lacy family, though the church was not mentioned in the Domesday Book, unlike other churches nearby (at Kippax, Silkstone and Darrington). Sometime in the 12th century, the church was gifted by the de Lacey family to the priory at Pontefract.

The church possesses a tower and spire on the western side, a nave with a north aisle and south porch, and a chancel with a north chapel and the vestry. The doorway in the south side of the tower (not the west side and which is slightly off-centre), has some decoration around it which is not Saxon, and is believed to be the work of Henry Curzon, who renovated the church in 1871.

One curiosity that has puzzled authors and historians is the presence of a doorway between the south porch and the nave. This doorway is 2 feet (0.6 m) wide and 14 feet (4.3 m) high. Pevsner suggested that it was possibly a long door between two floors, but Taylor thinks that its odd size might be to do with a procession into the old area of the church, and enables a large cross to be carried in. The tower displays three periods of architecture: it is Perpendicular at the top, the bell-stage is Norman, and the base is of Saxon origin. The chancel arch has carvings on it which have been dated to the 7th or 8th centuries. Although restored in the 19th century, these carvings are quite similar to carvings from the same date in churches in France.

The south wall of the nave is of Anglo-Saxon origin, and shows evidence of its 13th century windows being replaced by larger ones in the 15th century. The stones of the wall are sandstone and have been laid at angles similar to other earlier churches at Escomb, Jarrow and Corbridge.

When Stephen Glynne visited the church in 1862, he was effusive about the windows and architecture, but he also noted that the churchyard was "beautifully shaded by trees". In 1871, the church was renovated with new internal fittings and fixtures (mostly of oak), and a new font placed by the south doorway.

The church has several tombs, but those of two women, Dame Mary Bolles and Lady Elizabeth Hastings, are the most notable. Mary Bolles' father owned the estate of Ledsham (including the church) after the Reformation. Her brother died young, and through the lineage she inherited the estate, and was buried at Ledsham in 1662. Elizabeth Hastings is also buried within the church, in a tomb designed by Peter Scheemakers. Hastings was a local benefactor and philanthropist who disposed of the family's wealth which they had amassed from trading in East India. The organ was installed by the firm of Abbott and Smith in 1881. The entry in the National Pipe Organ Register describes it as "a rare survivor from the workshop of Isaac Abbot in 1881 with an exquisite tonal scheme and sensitively designed for a difficult location."

As the church dates back to at least the 8th century, it is thought to be the oldest church building still standing, and possible even the oldest building in West Yorkshire. The building was grade I listed in February 1967, and is part of the Ledsham Conservation Area, lying some 10 miles (16 km) east of Leeds, and 5 miles (8 km) north of Pontefract. The church is noted as a rare survivor from the Anglo-Saxon period in Yorkshire, and it has been suggested that it was the ecclesiastical centre of the ancient forest of Loidis.

Simon Jenkins rates the church in his book England's Thousand Best Churches as one of only nine in the whole of West Yorkshire. Jenkins describes the church as "...scraped and dark, but enlivened by the tombs and the tales of two remarkable ladies buried within."

== Parish and benefice ==
The church is within the ecclesiastical parish of Ledsham with Fairburn, and that is the name of the benefice. It is in the Diocese and Archdeaconry of York and the deanery of Selby, and has a relationship with the nearby primary school in the village, as it functions as a Church of England School.

== See also ==
- Grade I listed buildings in West Yorkshire
- Grade I listed churches in West Yorkshire
- Listed buildings in Ledsham, West Yorkshire
