= Yore Mill =

Historic mill in North Yorkshire, England

Coordinates: 54.2931°N 1.9845°W

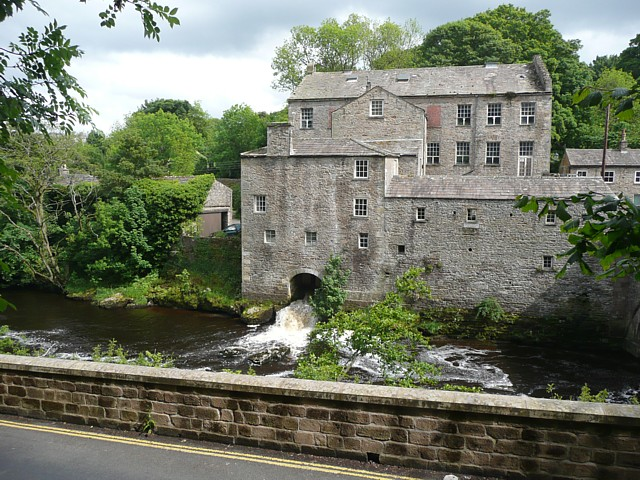
The mill, in 2009

Yore Mill is a historic building in Aysgarth, a village in North Yorkshire, in England.

The mill lies on the River Ure, by Yore Bridge. In the late Mediaeval period, the site housed a fulling mill, which was replaced in the late 18th century by a cotton mill. This burned down in 1853, and the current mill was completed in 1854, originally a combined corn and woollen mill, but by the end of the century, it only ground corn. In 1937, the waterwheel was replaced by turbines, and a roller plant installed. In 1969, the mill instead became a carriage museum, which closed in 2003. By 2019, the building was in disrepair, unsafe to enter due to the poor condition of the roof. In 2022, permission was granted to convert it into apartments and holiday lets. The building has been Grade II listed since 1981.

The building is constructed of rubble, with a stone slate roof. It is four storeys high and eight bays wide, with a T-shaped plan. Most of the windows are 14-pane sashes, and on the east elevation, the central bay of each floor has a door. The gable has a bell turret. Inside, the structure is supported by cast iron pillars with H-shaped sections, which support timber beams. To the north-west of the mill, the former mill offices survive from the Georgian building. Also built of stone, they are two storeys high with a basement, below which is an arch through which the mill race flows. The offices are connected to the mill by a two-storey timber framed extension, and are Grade II listed. They are in commercial use.

== See also ==
- Listed buildings in Aysgarth
