= Abbott and Smith =

English organ building company

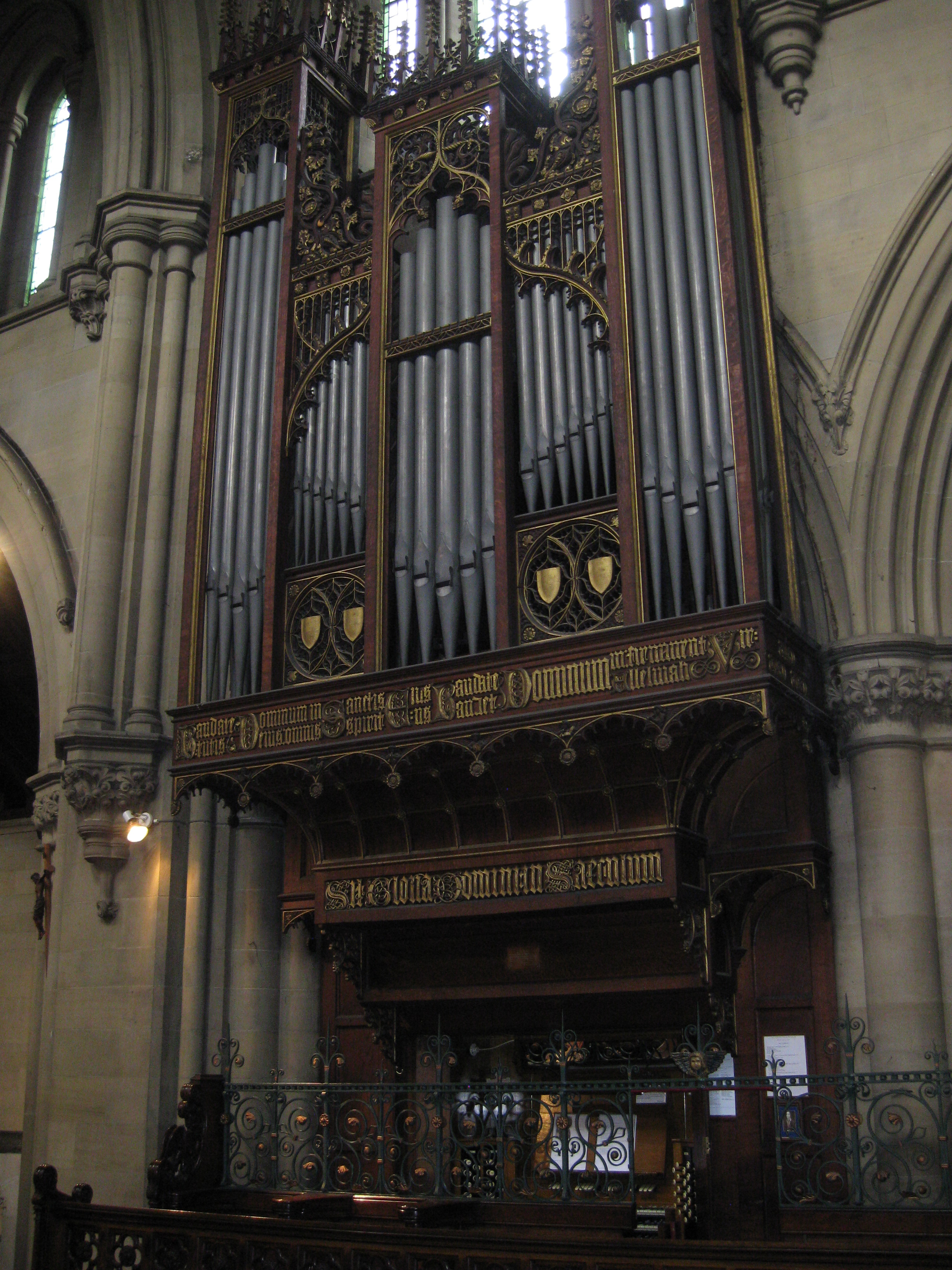
Organ in All Souls Church, Blackman Lane. The works was nearby on the same road.

Abbott and Smith were a firm of organ builders based in Leeds, England from 1869 to 1964.

== History ==
Isaac Abbott established the firm in Leeds in 1869. He had worked for William Hill in London for 20 years. Another Hill employee, William Stanwix Smith, was manager until Isaac Abbott retired in 1889. The firm followed the tonal style of Edmund Schulze.

From 1889 William Smith and Isaac Abbott’s son continued the firm. Later it passed to Smith’s sons and grandson.

In 1964 the firm was bought by J.H. Horsfall.

== List of organs ==
- St Peter's Church, Parwich 1873
- St Mary's Church, Chaddesden 1876
- All Souls, Blackman Lane 1877
- St Andrew's Church, Aysgarth 1880
- St Michael's Church, Derby 1880 enlarged
- Church of All Saints, Ledsham 1881
- Church of All Souls, Bolton 1881
- St Mary's Church, Sileby 1882 (enlarged)
- St Mary's Church, Eastling 1882
- St John the Baptist's Church, Kirby Wiske 1883
- St Anne's Church, Southowram, Halifax 1884
- Holy Trinity Church, Queensbury 1884
- Holy Trinity Church, Wensley 1885
- St Peter and St Paul's Church, Bolton-by-Bowland 1886
- AllSaints' Church, Newton-on-Ouse 1886
- Holy Trinity Church, Skipton 1888 organ moved
- Blenheim Palace 1888 (now in St Swithun's church, Hither Green)
- Our Lady and the English Martyrs Church, Cambridge 1890
- All Saints' Church, South Wingfield 1891
- Church of St Alkelda, Giggleswick
- St George's Minster, Doncaster 1894 new console and blowing equipment
- St John's Church, Silverdale 1897
- Trinity St David's Leeds (removed in 2004)
- St John and All Saints' Church, Easingwold 1903
- Emmanuel Cathedral, Durban 1912
- St Mary's Church, Gate Helmsley, North Yorkshire 1913
- Torphins Parish Church, Aberdeenshire 1913
- Daisy Street Church, Govanhill
- The old Sōgakudō Concert Hall, Tokyo 1920
- The King's School, Pontefract, West Yorkshire. 1934 (NPOR N07106)
- St Luke's Church, Wallsend, Tyneside. Undated (NPOR G00156)
- Trinity Church, Goole. East Yorkshire. Installed date as yet unknown. Organ Removed to Germany 2018.
- St Thomas Episcopal Church, Aboyne, Aberdeenshire
- St John the Evangelist, Ben Rydding (Ilkley), West Yorkshire. 1909 (rebuilt in 1933)
- St Thomas of Canterbury, Waterloo, Liverpool. Installation date unknown. To be moved soon.
- St John the Evangelist, Palmers Green, London. Installed in 1904 renovated in 1925 by Harrison & Harrison and again in 1955 by Wm. Hill & Son and Norman & Beard.
- Trinity Methodist Church, South Elmsall, West Yorkshire c.1900 (NPOR E00115)
- All Saints' Church, South Kirkby, West Yorkshire 1931 - rebuild of original unknown maker (NPOR S00164)
- Northfield Methodist Church, South Kirkby, West Yorkshire c.1900. Church demolished c.1976 and organ moved to Barnsley Road Methodist Church, South Elmsall, West Yorkshire. (NPOR E00118)
- Dun Laoghaire Methodist Church, Dublin, Ireland
- St John the Evangelist, Moulsham, Chelmsford, Essex. 1909 (NPOR H00570)
