= Listed buildings in Aysgarth =

Aysgarth is a civil parish in the county of North Yorkshire, England. It contains 14 listed buildings that are recorded in the National Heritage List for England. Of these, one is listed at Grade II*, the middle of the three grades, and the others are at Grade II, the lowest grade. The parish contains the village of Aysgarth and the surrounding area. The listed buildings include houses and cottages, a church, a public house, a bridge, a set of stocks, a former watermill, now a museum, and associated buildings, a boundary stone, a milepost, a rock garden and a war memorial.

== Key ==
Grade	Criteria
II*	Particularly important buildings of more than special interest
II	Buildings of national importance and special interest

== Buildings ==
Name and location	Photograph	Date	Notes	Grade
St Andrew's Church; 54.29242°N 1.98319°W		14th century	The oldest part of the church is the lower part of the tower, the rest being rebuilt in 1866. It is built in stone with a slate roof, and consists of a nave and a chancel with a clerestory, north and south aisles, a south porch and a west tower. The tower has five stages, buttresses, a doorway with a pointed arch on the north side, single-light vents, clock faces on the north and south sides, two-light bell openings, gargoyles, and an [[embattled parapet with eight crocketed pinnacles. There are also embattled parapets along the nave and the chancel.	II*
Yore Bridge; 54.29318°N 1.98508°W		16th century	The bridge, which was widened on the downstream side by John Carr in 1788, carries Church Bank over the River Ure. It is in stone, and consists of a single segmental arch. On the upstream side are two orders of voussoirs, a band, and a parapet with segmental coping. The downstream side has a soffit, chamfered rusticated voussoirs, a hood mould, a band, paterae in the spandrel]]s, and a parapet with segmental coping. The parapets curve, and end in circular bollards.	II
George and Dragon Hotel, former coach house and mounting block 54.29126°N 1.99510°W		Early 18th century	The public house is in roughcast stone and has a stone slate roof with stone copings and shaped kneelers. The main block has a plinth, two storeys, a T-shaped plan and three bays. In the centre is a two-storey porch containing a doorway with a chamfered surround and a cornice, and a casement window above. The outer bays contain sash windows, and to the right of the porch is a mounting block with three steps. The main block is joined to the former coach house by a screen wall, it is dated 1867, it has two storeys and three bays, and external steps. It contains sash and casement windows with wedge lintels, and a coach entrance with a segmental arch, rusticated voussoirs, and a dated keystone.	II
The Ferns; 54.29138°N 1.99599°W	—	Early 18th century	Three cottages combined into one house, it is in stone, and has a stone slate roof with stone copings. There are two storeys, four bays, a projecting bay on the left, and a rear wing. The windows on the front are sashes, and all the openings have deep sandstone lintels. At the rear is a doorway with a chamfered surround, and mullioned windows.	II
Stocks; 54.29154°N 1.99677°W		18th century (probable)	The stocks on the village green are in sandstone. The lower part has survived, it is about 1 metre (3 ft 3 in) long, and is flanked by two round-topped end-pieces about 500 millimetres (20 in) high.	II
Range northwest of Yore Mill; 54.29319°N 1.98471°W		Late 18th to early 19th century	Mill offices, later used for other purposes, in stone, with quoins and a hipped stone slate roof. There are two storeys and a basement. The building contains board doors, with varying surrounds, a fixed-light window in the ground floor, and a casement window in the upper floor. In the sub-basement is a segmental-arched opening from the tail race of the mill.	II
Boundary stone 54.28358°N 1.99368°W		Early 19th century (probable)	The stone is about 750 millimetres (30 in) high and has a rounded top. On the front are inscriptions, partly illegible.	II
White House; 54.29325°N 1.98367°W	—	Early 19th century	Originally the mill manager's house, it is in stone with a stone slate roof, three storeys and three bays. In the centre is a segmental arch partly infilled and a door inserted, and the windows are sashes.	II
Cottages southwest of Yore Mill; 54.29291°N 1.98466°W	—	Early to mid 19th century	A row of four stone former mill workers' cottages with a stone slate roof, hipped on the right. There are two storeys and eight bays. On the front are four doorways, there is one casement window, and the other windows are sashes.	II
Yore Mill Cottages; 54.29341°N 1.98402°W	—	Early to mid 19th century	A terrace of four former mill workers' cottages to the northeast of the mill, in stone with a stone slate roof. There are two storeys and eight bays. On the front are four doorways, the windows in the ground floor are sashes, and in the upper floor they are casements.	II
Yore Mill; 54.29311°N 1.98444°W		1854	The watermill, at one time a museum, is in stone with quoins, and a stone slate roof with a bell turret on the gable, and five metal cowls on the ridge. There are four storeys and a loft, a T-shaped plan, and eight bays. The entrance has a crow-stepped gable.	II
Milestone; 54.29153°N 1.97481°W		Late 19th century	The milepost on the north side of the A684 road is in painted cast iron, with a triangular plan and a sloping top. On each side is a pointed hand in relief, the left side has the distance to Leyburn, and on the right side is the distance to Hawes.	II
Rock garden 54.29118°N 1.99841°W		1906–14	The garden has been created using limestone blocks in mounds with paths between. It is enclosed by a stone wall with quoins, the return walls with flat coping and cast iron railings, and the front wall with triangular copings, containing a gate with monolithic piers, and railings and a gate with hoops and bud finials.	II
War memorial 54.29160°N 1.99608°W		Early 1920s	The war memorial on the village green consists of a pedestal with a lamp. It is in rough-hewn limestone, with a sandstone plinth, frieze and capstone, on a circular podium, The capstone is on a moulded cornice on which are four decorative scrolled wrought iron struts carrying a metal lamp. On the pedestal are two inscribed bronze plaques referring to the two World Was, with the names of those lost in the First World War. On the capstone and frieze are incised letters, and on the plinth are dates.	II
