= St Michael's Church, Derby =

St Michael’s Church, Derby
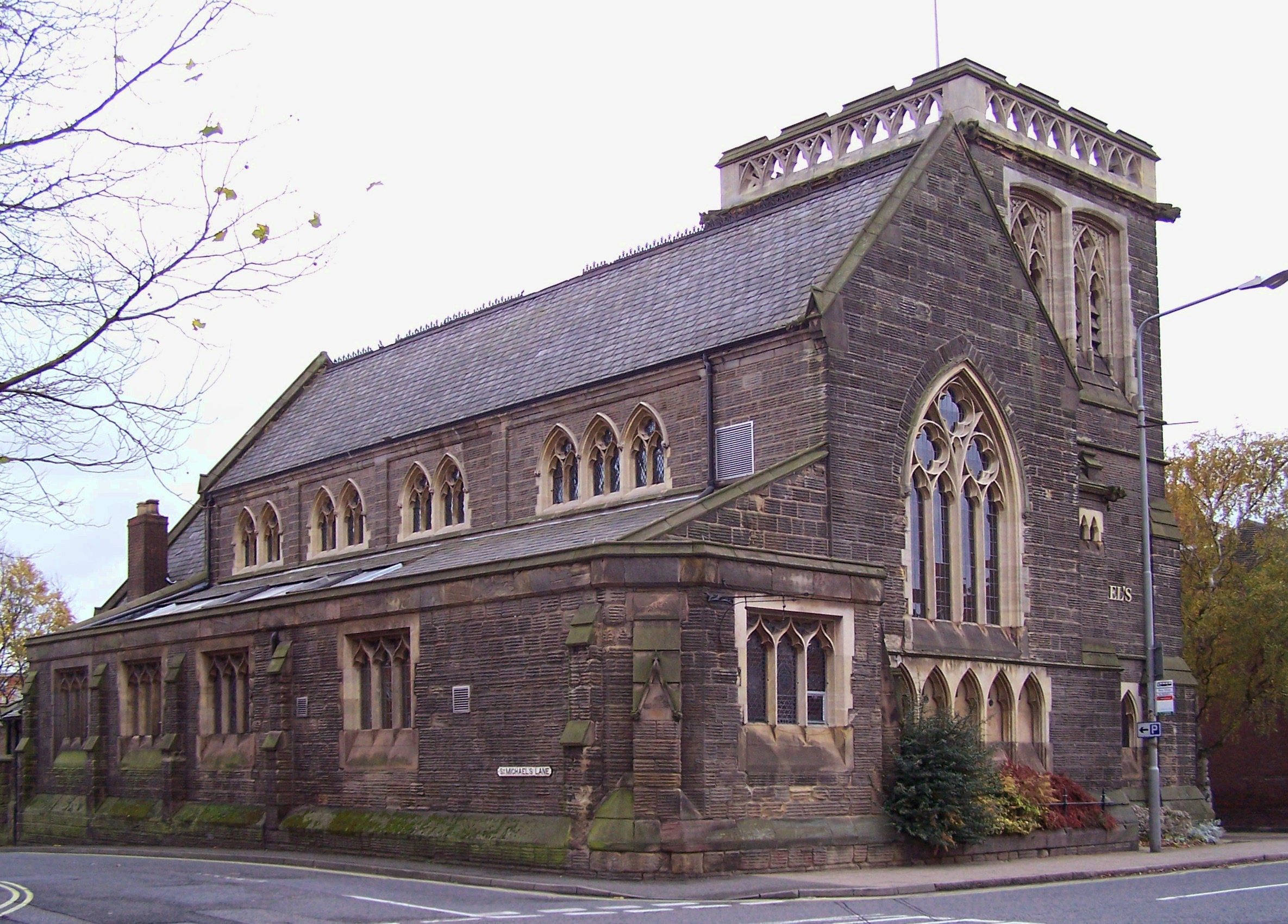
- St Michael’s Church, Derby
- St Michael’s Church, Derby
- 52°55′32.9″N 1°28′42.92″W
- Location: Derby, Derbyshire
- Country: England
- Previous denomination: Church of England

History
- Dedication: St Michael

Architecture
- Architect: Henry Isaac Stevens
- Groundbreaking: 15 April 1857
- Completed: 8 April 1858
- Closed: 1977

St Michael's Church, Derby is a redundant parish church in the Church of England in Derby.

== History ==
The parish church was of medieval origins; transferred to the Abbot of Derby in 1240 by Sir Rafe de Freshville. The chancel collapsed on 17 August 1856 which prompted the building of the new church starting on 1857. The foundation stone was laid by Sir William Evans, 1st Baronet on 15 April 1857, and the new building opened for worship on 8 April 1858. It was consecrated by The Lord Bishop of Lichfield John Lonsdale.

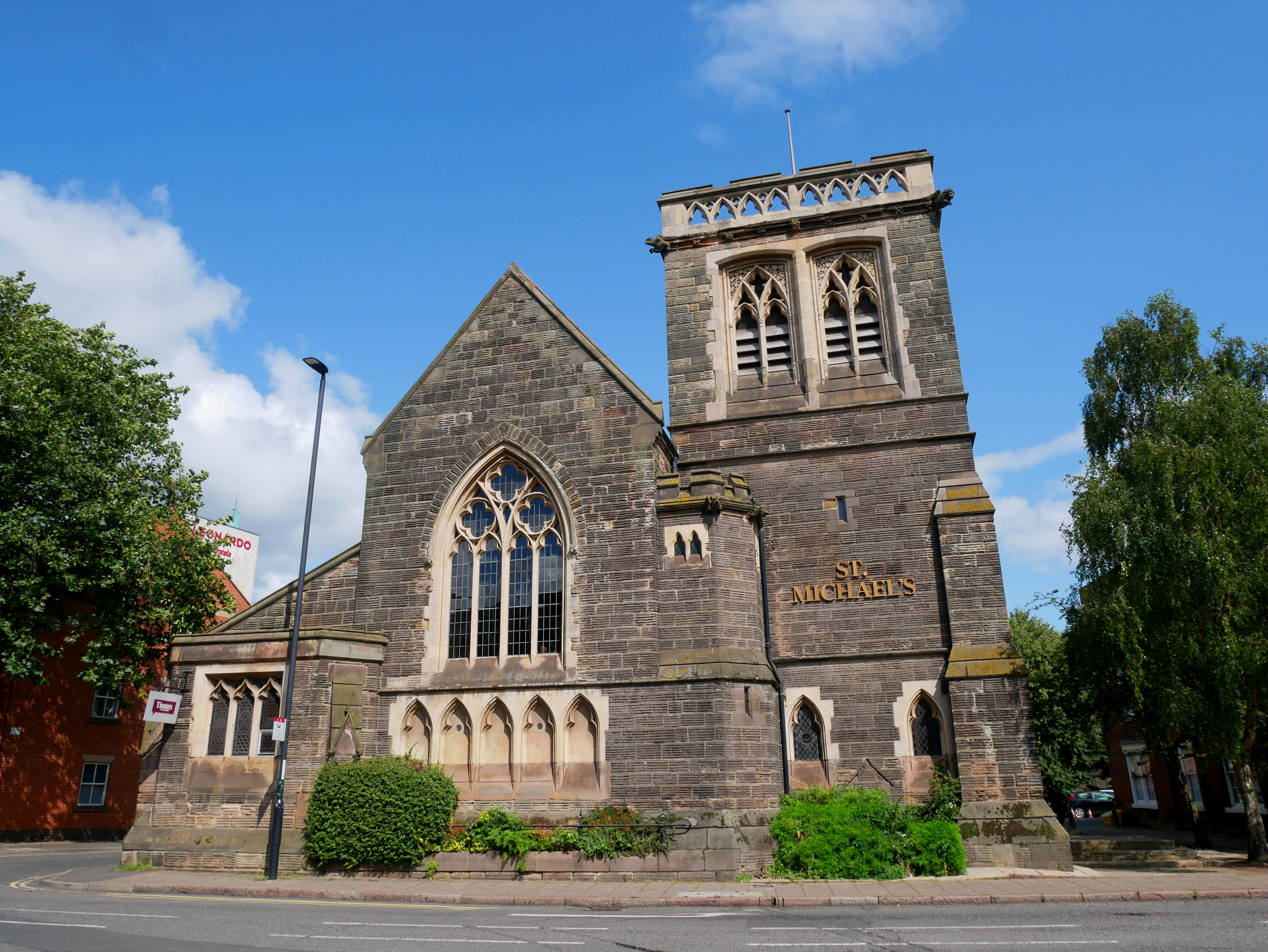
West face of the church

The new church retained some features from the old. Below the royal arms of Queen Anne on the east wall of the north aisle, there was some wrought ironwork possibly by Robert Bakewell, with repoussé ironwork, including a trumpet-bearing angel. The porch had two coffin slabs, one Saxon, the other 13th century. The chancel had three 18th-century wall tablets.

The new church had two stained-glass windows at the east end of the aisles by Gibbs and Co of London. The main east end window was by N. W. Lavers of London.

The church closed in 1977, and was converted into office premises and is used by Lathams.

== Organ ==
The church contained an organ dating from 1859. The organ was enlarged to 21 stops in 1880 by Isaac Abbott of Leeds. There was later work by J. H. Adkins of Derby in 1914 and the number of stops was then 26. A specification of the organ can be found on the National Pipe Organ Register.

=== Organists ===
- C. R. Toon 1906–1938
