= Ledsham, West Yorkshire =

Village and civil parish in West Yorkshire, England

Coordinates: 53.762°N 1.310°W

Ledsham
- Village
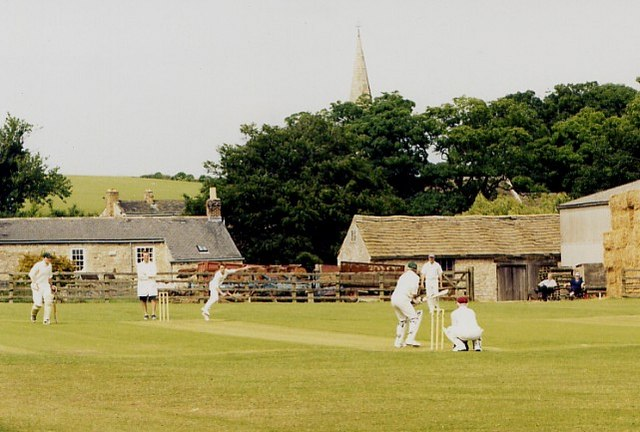
- A game of cricket in Ledsham, 2003 (note church spire in the background)

- Location within West Yorkshire
- Population: 181 (2011 census)
- OS grid reference: SE455297
- Metropolitan borough: City of Leeds
- Metropolitan county: West Yorkshire
- Region: Yorkshire and the Humber
- Country: England
- Sovereign state: United Kingdom
- Post town: LEEDS
- Postcode district: LS25
- Dialling code: 01977
- Police: West Yorkshire
- Fire: West Yorkshire
- Ambulance: Yorkshire

Ledsham is a village and civil parish 4 miles (6 km) north of Castleford and 11 miles (18 km) east of Leeds in the county of West Yorkshire, England. The village is in the City of Leeds metropolitan borough and near to the A1(M) motorway. It had a population of 162 at the 2001 Census, increasing to 181 at the 2011 Census.

== History ==
Ledsham is mentioned in the Domesday Book of 1086 as Ledesha, as belonging to Ilbert of Lacy and having six villagers, three ploughlands, and 5 acres (2 ha) of meadow. However, it was recorded in a charter from 1030 as Ledesham. Like nearby Ledston, the name seems to refer to Leeds (or the Old English precursor of this name, Loidis, which denoted a region rather than a town); the second element is the Old English word hām ('homestead, farm'). The name thus meant 'the farm belonging to the region of Loidis'.

Ledsham was an ancient parish in the wapentake of Barkston Ash in the West Riding of Yorkshire. The parish included the townships of Fairburn and Ledston, which became separate civil parishes in 1866.

== Geography ==
To the east is Selby Fork junction, which is also partly in South Milford, in North Yorkshire, but previously in the West Riding; in the early 1960s, the M62 motorway was planned to have its eastern terminus at Ledsham, possibly at the Selby Fork junction.

== Notable buildings ==
The late seventh-century Anglo-Saxon All Saints church is the oldest church and the oldest building standing in West Yorkshire, and includes memorials to Lady Elizabeth Hastings and her family.

== Education ==
The village school, like schools in Collingham and Thorp Arch, was named after Lady Elizabeth Hastings. The school is now located in the nearby village of Ledston, which was rated as good by OFSTED in 2018.

== Sports ==
Ledsham has a cricket team, which currently plays in the York league.

== Governance ==
Since 1974 Ledsham has been a part of the metropolitan borough of the City of Leeds, in the county of West Yorkshire. It is its own civil parish, and is in the Kippax and Methley ward for local affairs, and is in the Elmet and Rothwell Constituency for national level politics.

== See also ==
- Listed buildings in Ledsham, West Yorkshire
