= Penhill =

Hill in Wensleydale, North Yorkshire, England

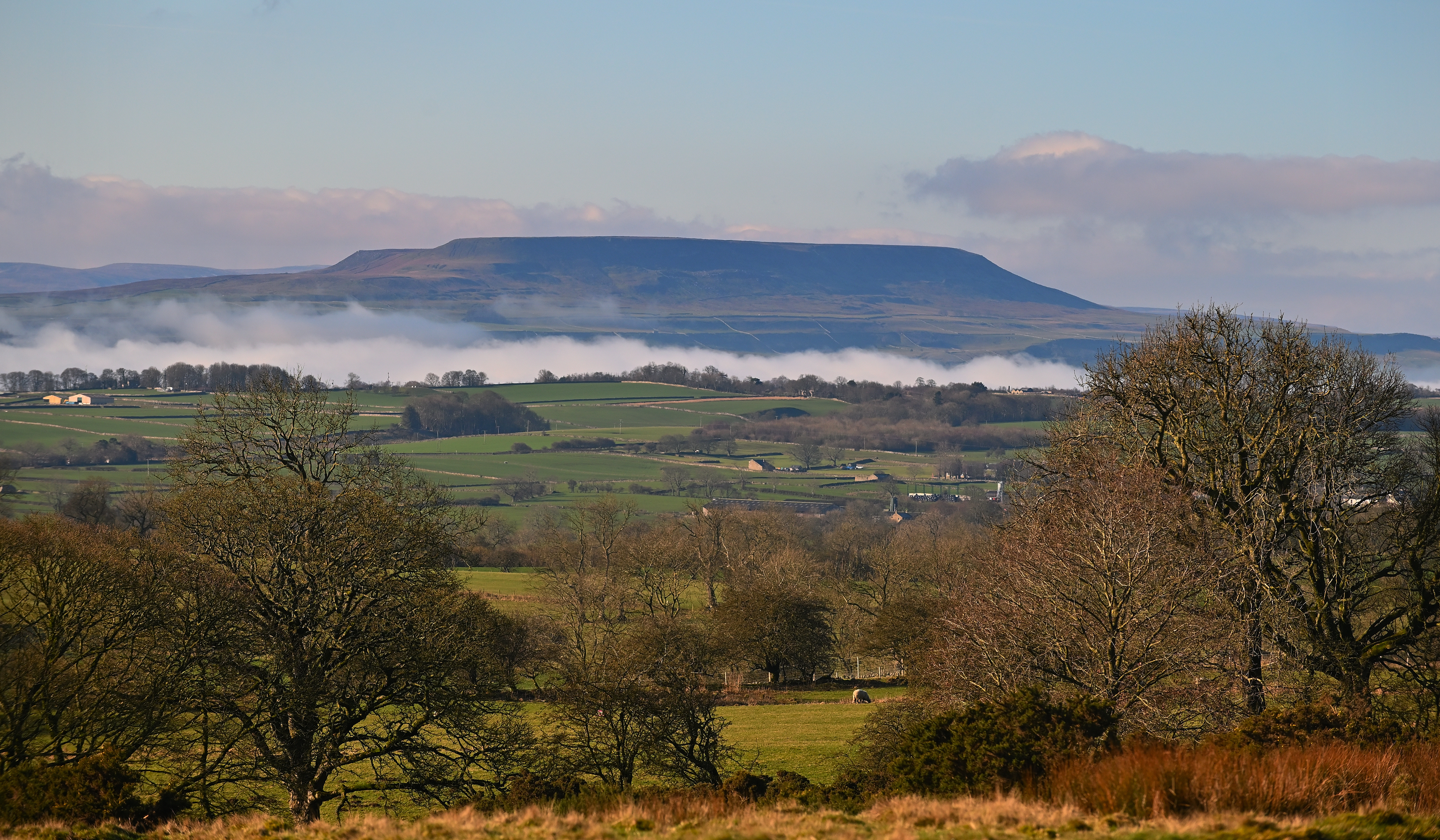

Highest point
- Elevation: 553 m (1,814 ft)
- Prominence: 124 m (407 ft)
- Coordinates: 54°16′30.8″N 1°56′07.1″W

Geography
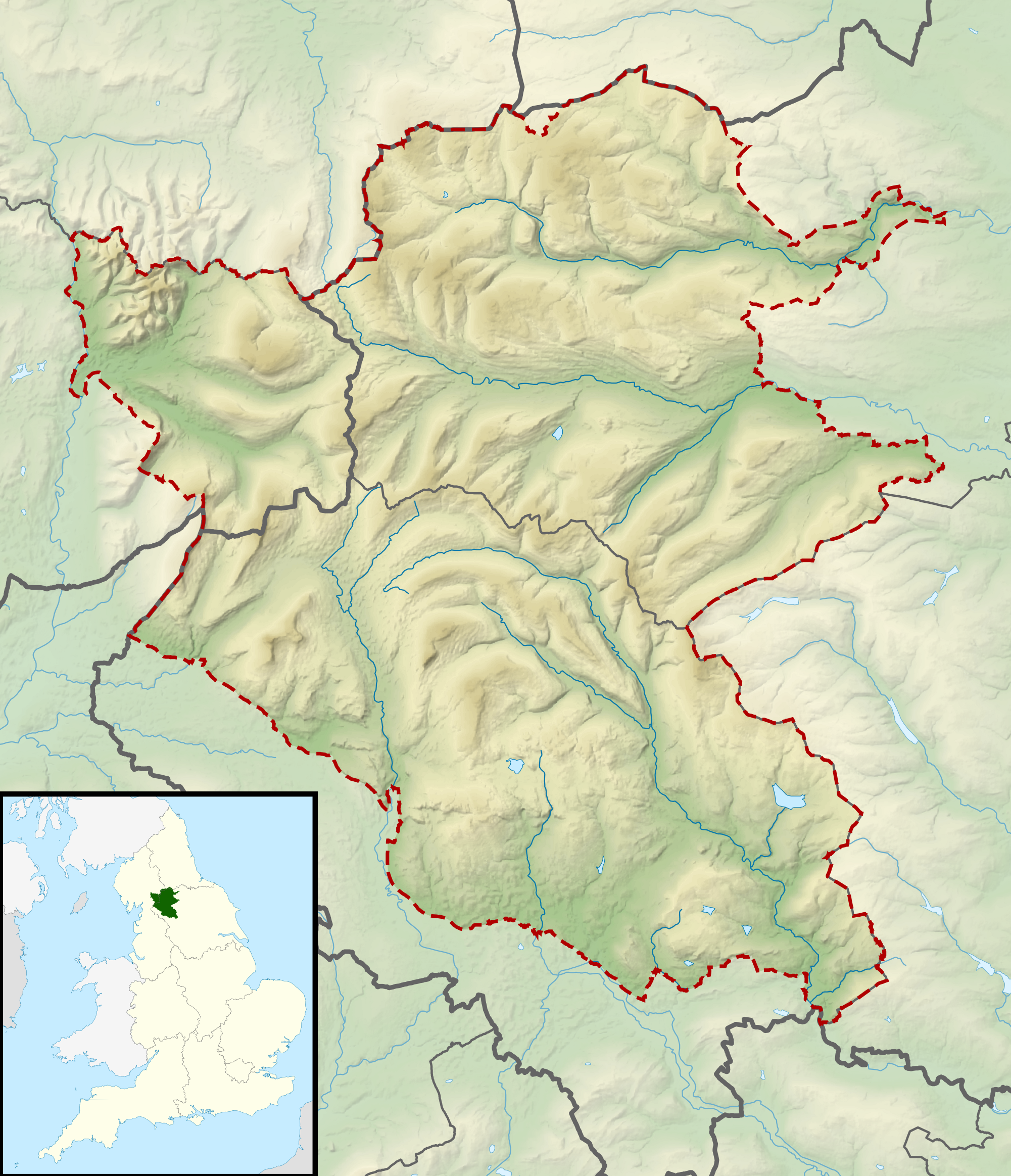
- Location within Yorkshire Dales
- Location: North Yorkshire, England
- Parent range: Pennines, Yorkshire Dales

Penhill (526 metres (1,726 ft) high at the trig point, 553 metres (1,814 ft) at Height of Hazely) is a prominent hill, 5.5 miles (9 km) south west of Leyburn, in the Pennines, North Yorkshire, England. It forms a ridge that commands the southern side of Wensleydale and the northern side of Coverdale. Its concave shape was formed during the last ice age, when glaciers carved Wensleydale into a U-shape. The summit plateau has a trig point, small tarns on the peat moor, and, visible from the valley floor, a beacon at its eastern end, part of the large network built to warn of a Spanish invasion.

Like Pendle Hill, Penhill is a pleonastic name consisting of Brittonic (penn) and Old English (hyll) words for 'hill'. One local legend is that the hill was the home of the Penhill Giant, who would steal sheep from the local flocks.

== Access and visibility ==
Penhill is accessed by public footpaths from the village of West Witton, by a bridleway from a minor road between West Witton and Melmerby, or over open access land from the south.

Although Penhill is not a very high hill, its position near the mouth of Wensleydale makes it visible from a considerable distance – from the North York Moors across the Vale of York, as well as from many points in the dale.

== Penhill Giant ==
The Penhill Giant is a character found in English folklore and legends. The giant is said to have lived in a fortress on Penhill. There are general legends and tales about the character which claim that he ate flocks of sheep and terrorised maidens in the local area. He is said to have roamed the hills with a hound called Wolfhead and a herd of pigs.

Ian Taylor wrote a book, The Giant of Penhill, in which he claimed that the legends about the giant could have had some basis in fact, and that the giant may be a lost terrestrial figure. Taylor also linked ley lines to Penhill.
