= Swinithwaite Hall =

Historic building in Swinithwaite, North Yorkshire, England

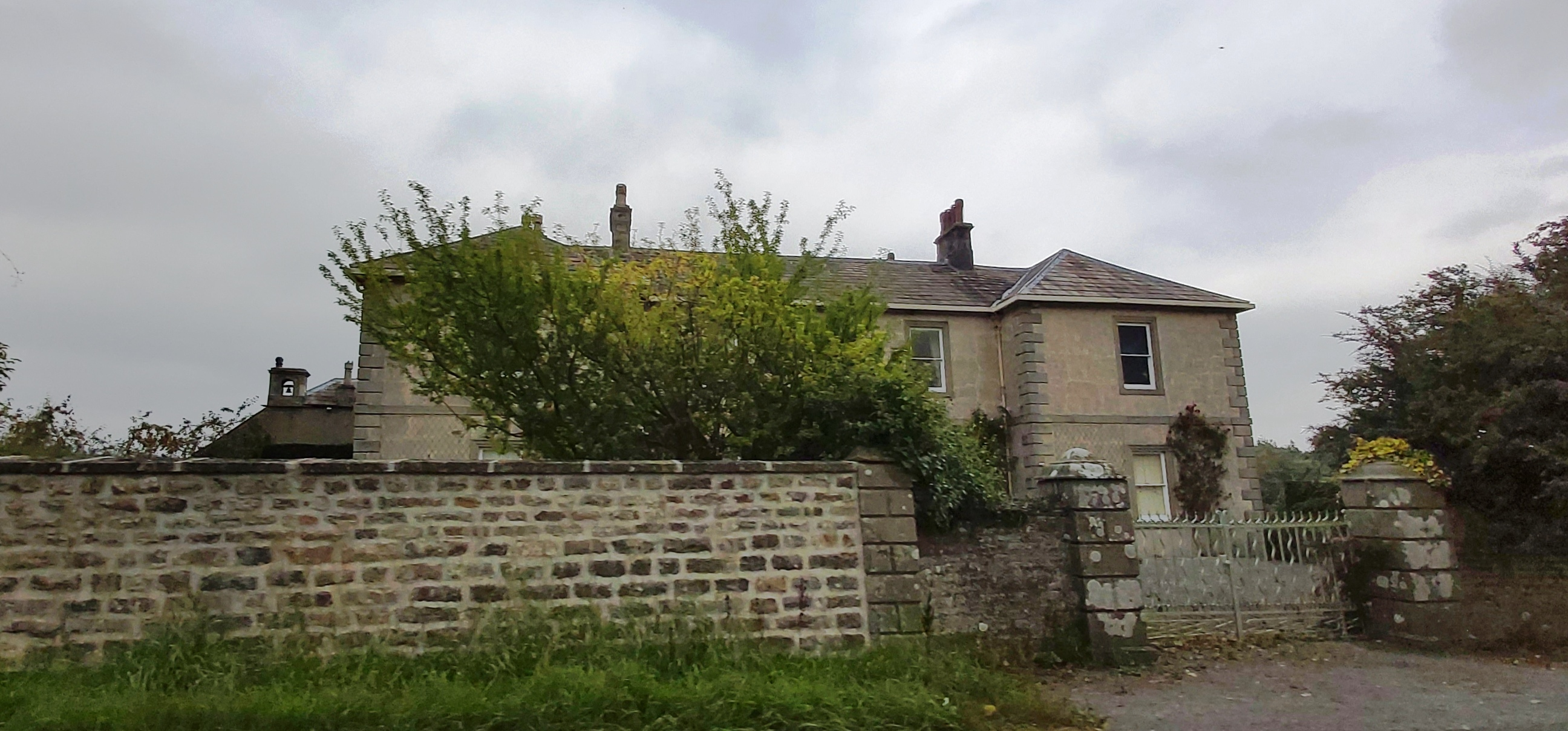
- The building in 2020

- Location within North Yorkshire

General information
- Location: Swinithwaite, North Yorkshire, England
- Coordinates: 54°17′55″N 1°55′53″W
- Year built: 1767
- Renovated: 1795 (extended)
- Client: T. J. Anderson (1795)

Design and construction
- Architect: John Foss (1795)

Listed Building – Grade II*
- Official name: Swinithwaite Hall
- Designated: 13 February 1967
- Reference no.: 1179461

Listed Building – Grade II
- Official name: Wing attached to rear of Swinithwaite Hall
- Designated: 13 February 1967
- Reference no.: 1130850

Swinithwaite Hall is a historic building in Swinithwaite, a hamlet in North Yorkshire, England.

== History ==
The house was constructed in 1767, as a reconstruction or remodelling of an earlier manor house. In 1795, it was extended by John Foss, for T. J. Anderson. It was Grade II* listed in 1967. The servants' wing, at the rear of the house, was later divided to become a separate house and store, and is Grade II listed.

== Architecture ==
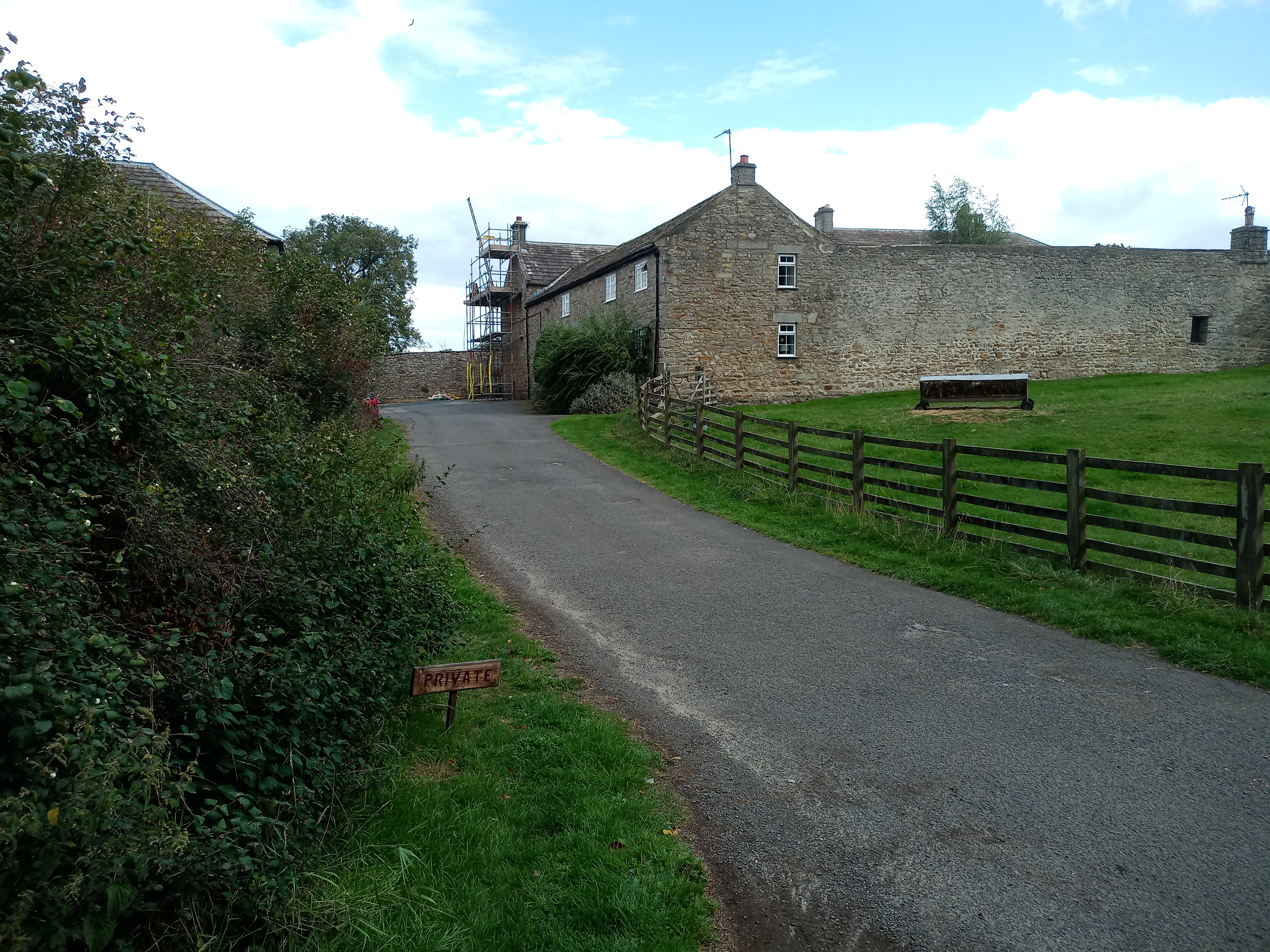
The rear wing

The house is built of stone, roughcast on the front and sides, with chamfered quoins, and hipped stone slate roofs. There are two storeys and an H-shaped plan, with two storeys and five bays. The outer bays of the front project as wings, and there is a floor band. The central doorway has an architrave, a pulvinated frieze, and a pediment on consoles, and the windows are sashes in architraves. The middle bay of the garden front projects slightly under a pedimented gable. It contains a Tuscan doorcase with a pediment, and a doorway with an architrave, and above it is a Tuscan Venetian window, and a moulded cornice.

The former servants' wing is also built of stone, partly roughcast, and has a stone slate roof with a shaped kneelers and stone coping on the left. There are two storeys and four bays. The doorway has a chamfered quoined surround, and the windows are a mix of sashes and casements.

== See also ==
- Grade II* listed buildings in North Yorkshire (district)
- Listed buildings in West Witton
