= West Witton =

Village and civil parish in North Yorkshire England

Coordinates: 54°17′29″N 1°54′31″W

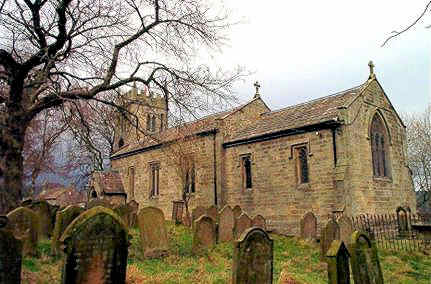
- St Bartholomew's Church, West Witton

- Location within North Yorkshire
- Population: 347 (2011 Census)
- OS grid reference: SE062884
- Unitary authority: North Yorkshire
- Ceremonial county: North Yorkshire
- Region: Yorkshire and the Humber
- Country: England
- Sovereign state: United Kingdom
- Post town: Leyburn
- Postcode district: DL8
- Police: North Yorkshire
- Fire: North Yorkshire
- Ambulance: Yorkshire

West Witton is a village and civil parish in the county of North Yorkshire, England. Located in Wensleydale in the Yorkshire Dales it lies on the A684 (the main road between Leyburn and Hawes).

The civil parish also includes the hamlet of Swinithwaite. The population of the parish at the 2011 Census was 347. In 2015, North Yorkshire County Council estimated the population to be 340. From 1974 to 2023 it was part of the district of Richmondshire. It is now administered by the unitary North Yorkshire Council.

The educator Eric James, Baron James of Rusholme, lived in West Witton, and after his death had his ashes scattered there.

== History ==
There was a settlement at West Witton during the Iron Age and the Roman occupation of Britain.

West Witton was originally known simply as Witton, and was mentioned (as Witun) in Domesday Book. The name is Old English, from widu and tūn, meaning "wood settlement", suggesting a place where wood was felled or worked. By the late 12th century the village became known as West Witton to distinguish it from another Witton, now known as East Witton, 5 miles (8 km) down Wensleydale.

The parish church of St Bartholomew dates back to 1281 but was largely rebuilt in the 19th century. It was under the governance of Jervaulx Abbey until the dissolution of the monasteries, when the patronage of the parish passed to the crown, before being sold to the Earl of Sunderland. The old vicarage is now an hotel.

== Burning of Bartle ==
The village is famous locally for its "Burning of Bartle" ceremony held on the Saturday nearest 24 August (St Bartholomew's Day).

A larger than life effigy of 'Bartle' is paraded around the village, complete with glowing eyes. Bartle stops at various strategic places to recite the doggerel, before finally being burnt at Grassgill End to much merry singing.

The doggerel is:

On Penhill Crags he tore his rags;
Hunter's Thorn he blew his horn;
Capplebank Stee happened a misfortune and brak' his knee;
Grisgill Beck he brak' his neck;
Wadham's End he couldn't fend;
Grassgill End we'll mak' his end.
Shout, lads, shout.

At Grassgill end they burn the Bartle effigy. This celebration has its similarities to Guy Fawkes Night. One local folk-story is that Bartle was the sheep-stealing Penhill Giant.

== Popular culture ==
St Bartholomew's Church was featured in the British television series All Creatures Great and Small, in the episode "Cats and Dogs". Meanwhile, when filming in Yorkshire, several of the cast stayed at West Witton's pub, the Heifer.

== See also ==
- Listed buildings in West Witton
