= Holy Trinity Church, Wensley =

Anglican church in North Yorkshire, England

Coordinates: 54.3014°N 1.8600°W

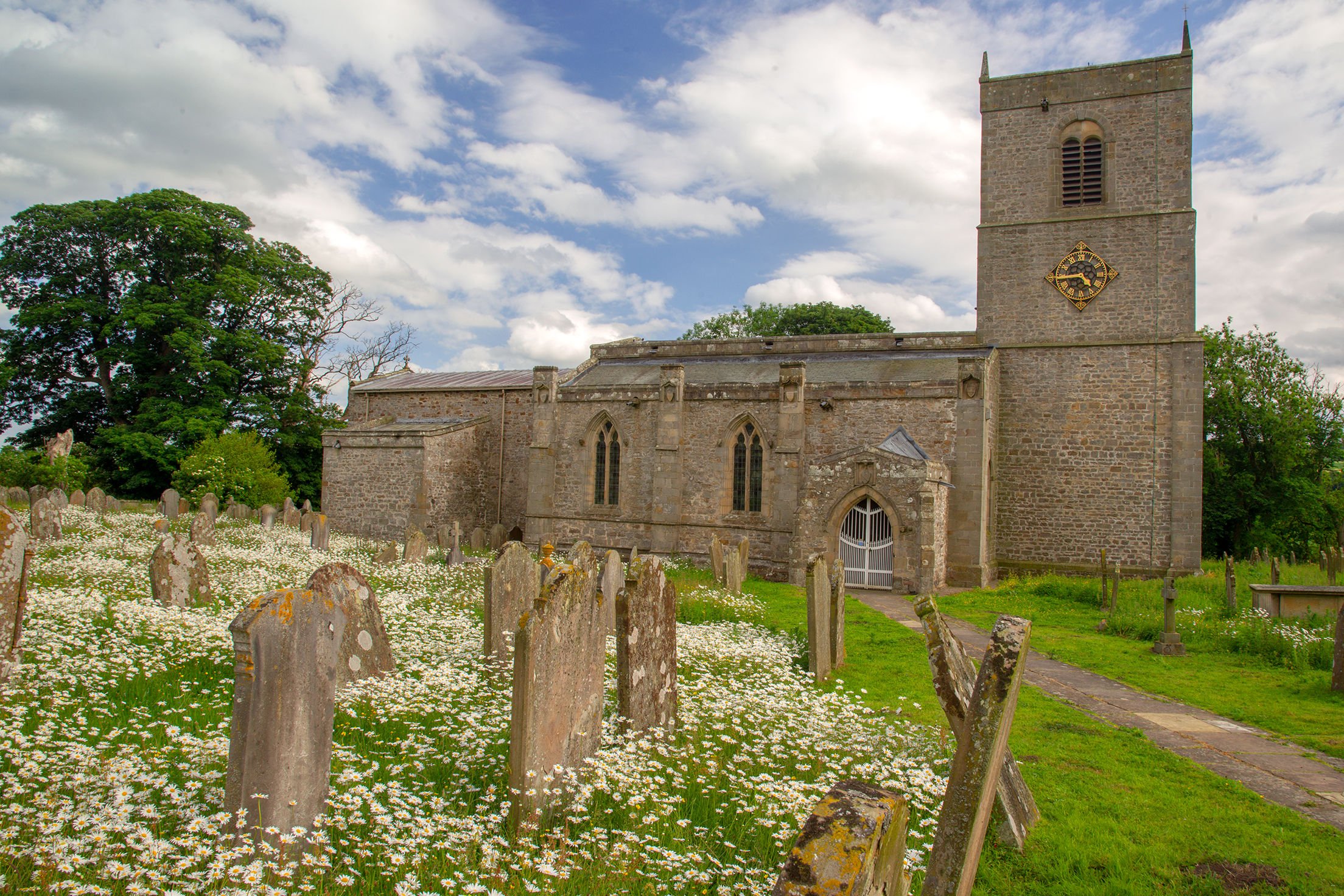
- Holy Trinity Church, Wensley, from the northeast

- Location in North Yorkshire
- OS grid reference: SE092895
- Location: Wensley, North Yorkshire
- Country: England
- Denomination: Anglican
- Website: Churches Conservation Trust

History
- Dedication: Holy Trinity

Architecture
- Functional status: Redundant
- Architectural type: Church
- Style: Gothic
- Groundbreaking: Mid-13th century
- Completed: 1719

Specifications
- Materials: Stone rubble with sandstone ashlar dressings

Listed Building – Grade I
- Official name: Church of Holy Trinity
- Designated: 13 February 1967
- Reference no.: 1130879

Holy Trinity Church is a redundant Anglican church on Low Lane in the village of Wensley, North Yorkshire, England. The building is recorded in the National Heritage List for England as a designated Grade I listed building (since 13 February 1967), and is under the care of the Churches Conservation Trust. Alec Clifton-Taylor included the church in his list of 'best' English parish churches.

== History ==
The present church dates from the middle of the 13th century, and is built on the foundations of an 8th-century Saxon church. Additions or alterations were made in the 14th and 15th centuries, and the tower was added in 1719. Church records list rectors from 1181 (Geoffrey de Well) to 2001 (Robert Miles). For centuries starting in the 1300s, Holy Trinity received support from the owners of Bolton Castle, the Scrope family.

A report on this building by the University of London provides the following specifics:

"The church dates from about 1240, the south chancel wall being almost intact of that date. The chancel was then of the same size as at present, but the east window and the piscina appear to be somewhat later, and the north wall of the chancel has evidently been rebuilt upon the old foundations. The chancel arch and the capitals and bases of the two nave arcades are also work of this date. The arcades are unusually lofty; the aisles were rebuilt about 1330, when these arches seem to have been raised to the same height as the chancel arch. The north vestry, with priest's lodging above, and the north and south porches are work of the 15th century. The tower and the west ends of the aisles were rebuilt in the 18th century."

Box pews were added in the early 19th century but the medieval character was retained. The two manual pipe organ was installed in 1885. The church was restored in 1927 when the roof was renewed, and the whitewash on the walls was removed. This restoration revealed wall paintings depicting Jacob and Esau which were restored as far as possible. Rt. Revd. Lucius Smith, Bishop of Knaresborough re-opened it on 25 January 1928.

When the church was vested in the Churches Conservation Trust in 2006 a number of repairs were necessary costing about £125,000.

While it is not used for worship, the church remains open to visitors; some events are also held here, such as the flower festival, christenings, weddings and funerals.

In October 2021, the church was one of 142 sites across England to receive part of a £35-million injection from the government's Culture Recovery Fund.

== Architecture ==
=== Exterior ===
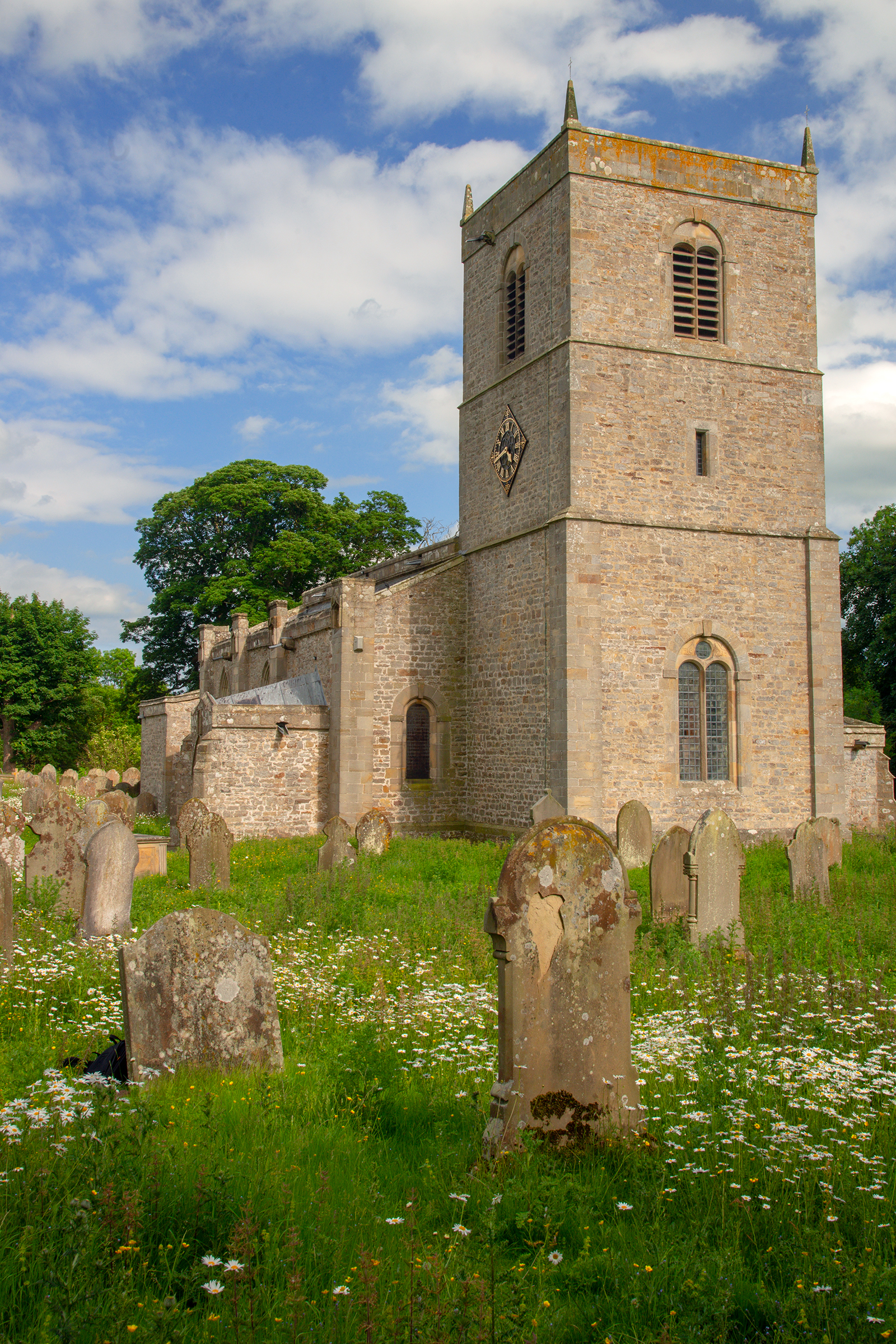
The church tower

The church is constructed in stone rubble with sandstone ashlar dressings. The roof is in Welsh slate, with lead on the chancel and the north porch. A number of carved Saxon stones are built into the walls. Its plan consists of a nave, with north and south aisles and north and south porches, a chancel with a north vestry, and a west tower. The tower has three stages, with buttresses on the bottom stage, and a two-light west window. On the south side is a stair turret. The clock was made by W. Potts and Son of Leeds and is dated 1899.

In the middle stage there are single-light windows on the west and south faces, a door on the east side, and a clock on the north face. The top stage contains two-light bell openings. On the summit, the parapet is plain and there are small obelisks at the corners. The south aisle has a two-light west window. The gabled south porch dates from the 15th century and has diagonal buttresses. Above its opening is a sundial dated 1846. Inside the porch are stone benches. The north porch dates from the 14th century; it is also gabled with diagonal buttresses. Above the doorway are coats of arms, and it also contains stone benches. On the south side of the church are buttresses with three double lancet windows, the middle one of which is over a priest's door. The east window has five lights, and on the east gable end is a cross. The vestry on the north side has two storeys. There is a two-light window on each storey. Inside the church is a tower arch, a chancel arch and a three-bay arcade, all dating from the early 14th century.

=== Interior ===
The church is considered to be as notable for its furnishings as for its architecture. In the chancel is a piscina with a trefoil head. On the chancel floor are two brass memorials. The choir stalls have carved ends dated 1527, and the communion rail dates from the 17th century. In the tower arch is a 15th-century rood screen. The nave contains the Scrope family pew with a 17th-century front and, at the back is a carved parclose screen from the early 16th century, that was moved from Easby Abbey at the dissolution. The nave also contains 17th-century benches and box pews from the 18th century, an 18th-century double-decker pulpit, and an octagonal font dated 1662 with a cover wooden cover surmounted by a pineapple finial. On the walls are memorials, and on the north wall are fragments of (14th century) medieval wall paintings discovered during 1927–1928. In the east window of the south aisle are fragments of medieval stained glass.

Also in the church is a royal coat of arms dated 1701, and the standard of the Loyal Dales Volunteers. A wooden cupboard in the church is claimed to be a reliquary containing remains of Saint Agatha. The three-manual organ was built by Isaac Abbott of Leeds in memory of Letitia, Baroness Bolton (d. 4 January 1882) and opened on 19 April 1883, and later restored by Wood Wordsworth, also of Leeds. There is a ring of three bells. Two of these were cast in 1725 by Samuel II Smith, and the third was cast by Charles and George Mears of the Whitechapel Bell Foundry in 1847.

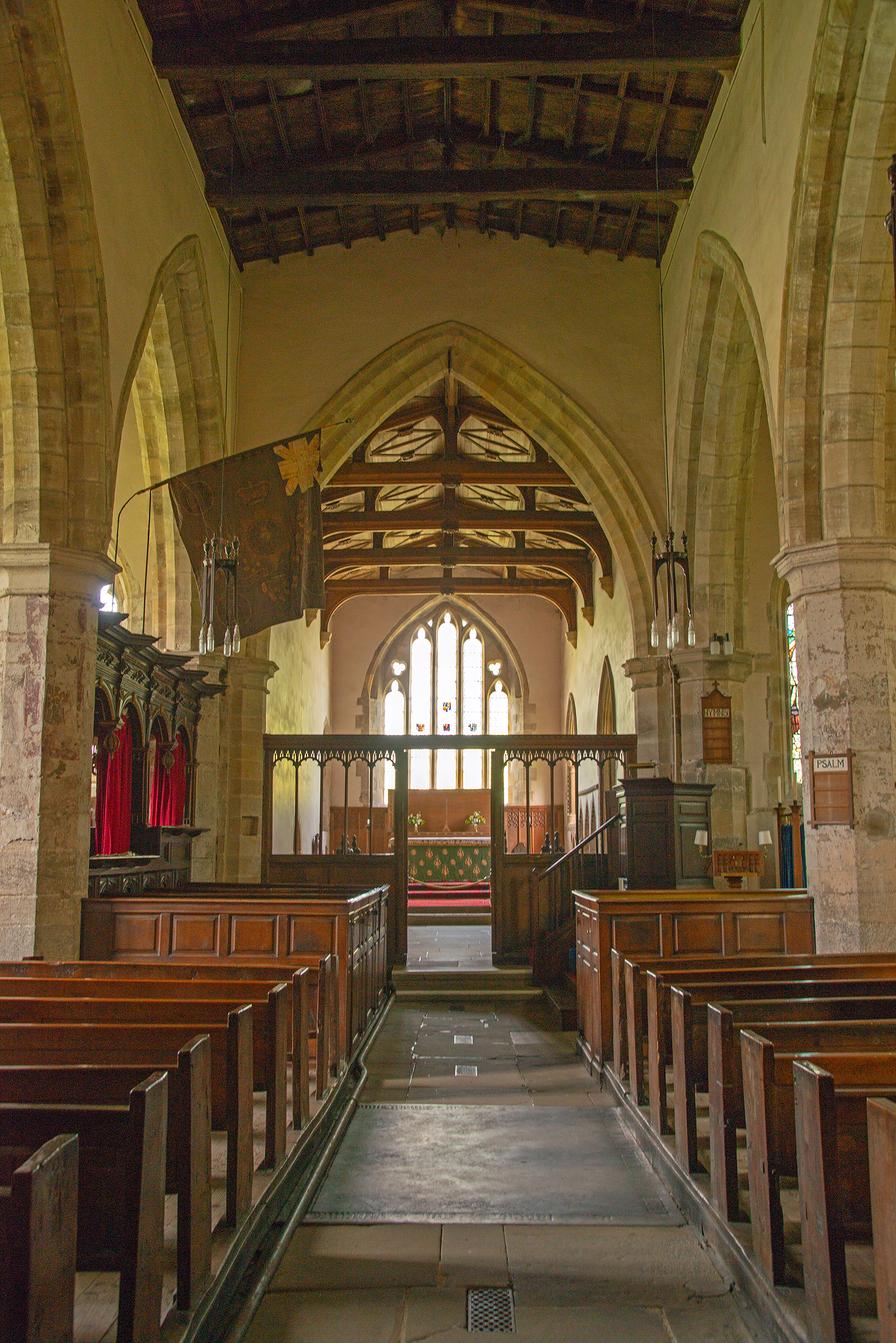
Interior, Holy Trinity, Wensley (June 2018)

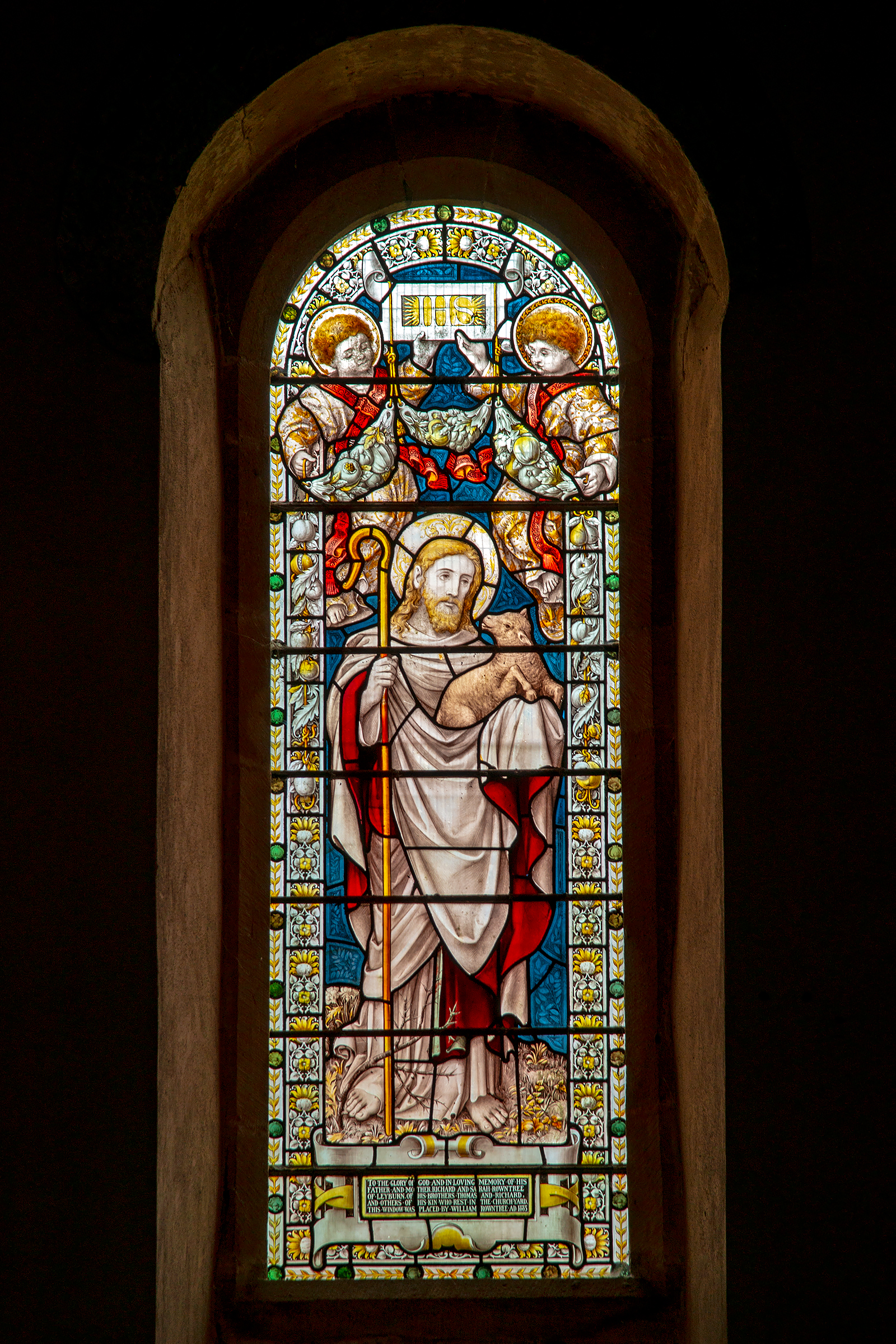
Stained glass

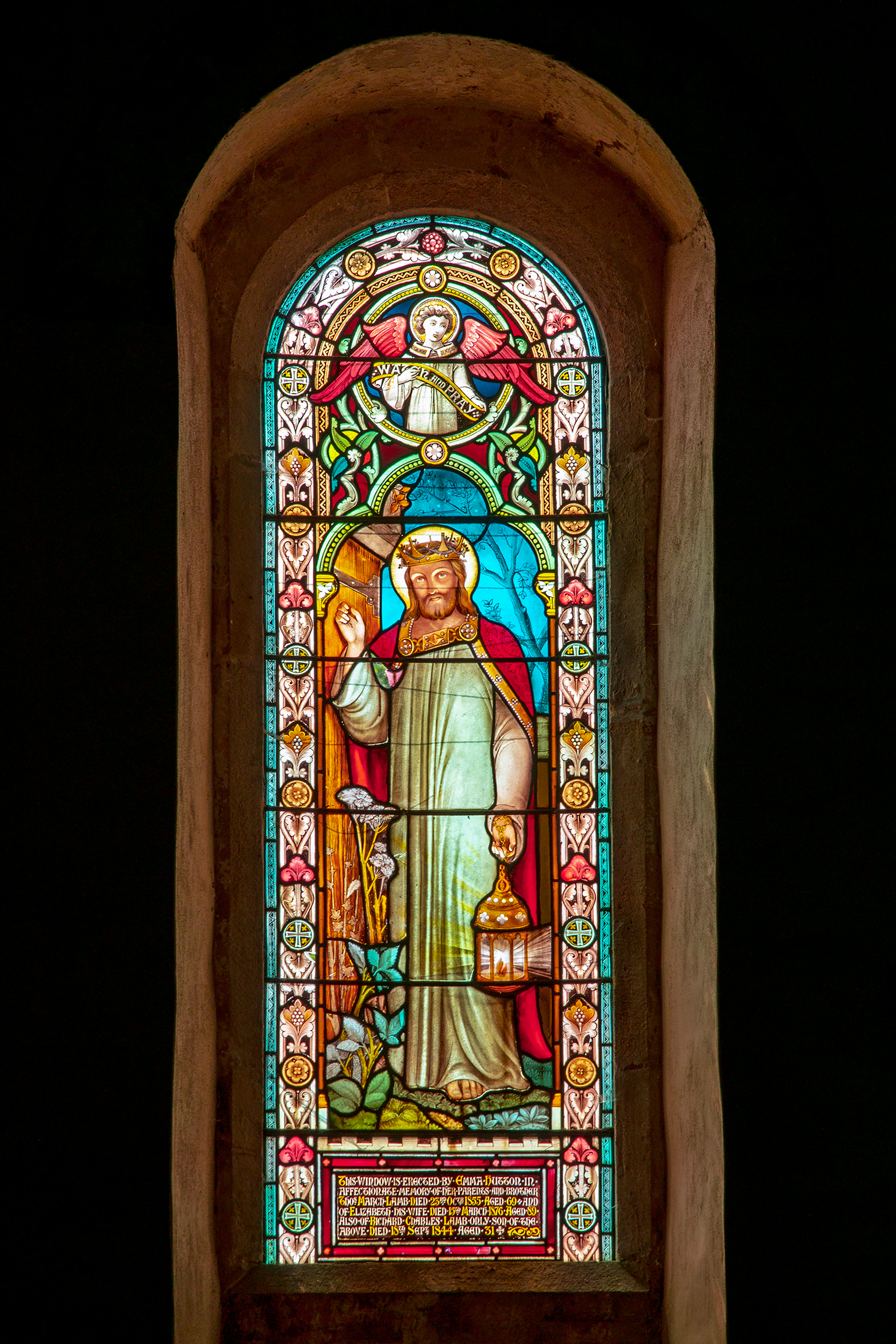
Stained glass

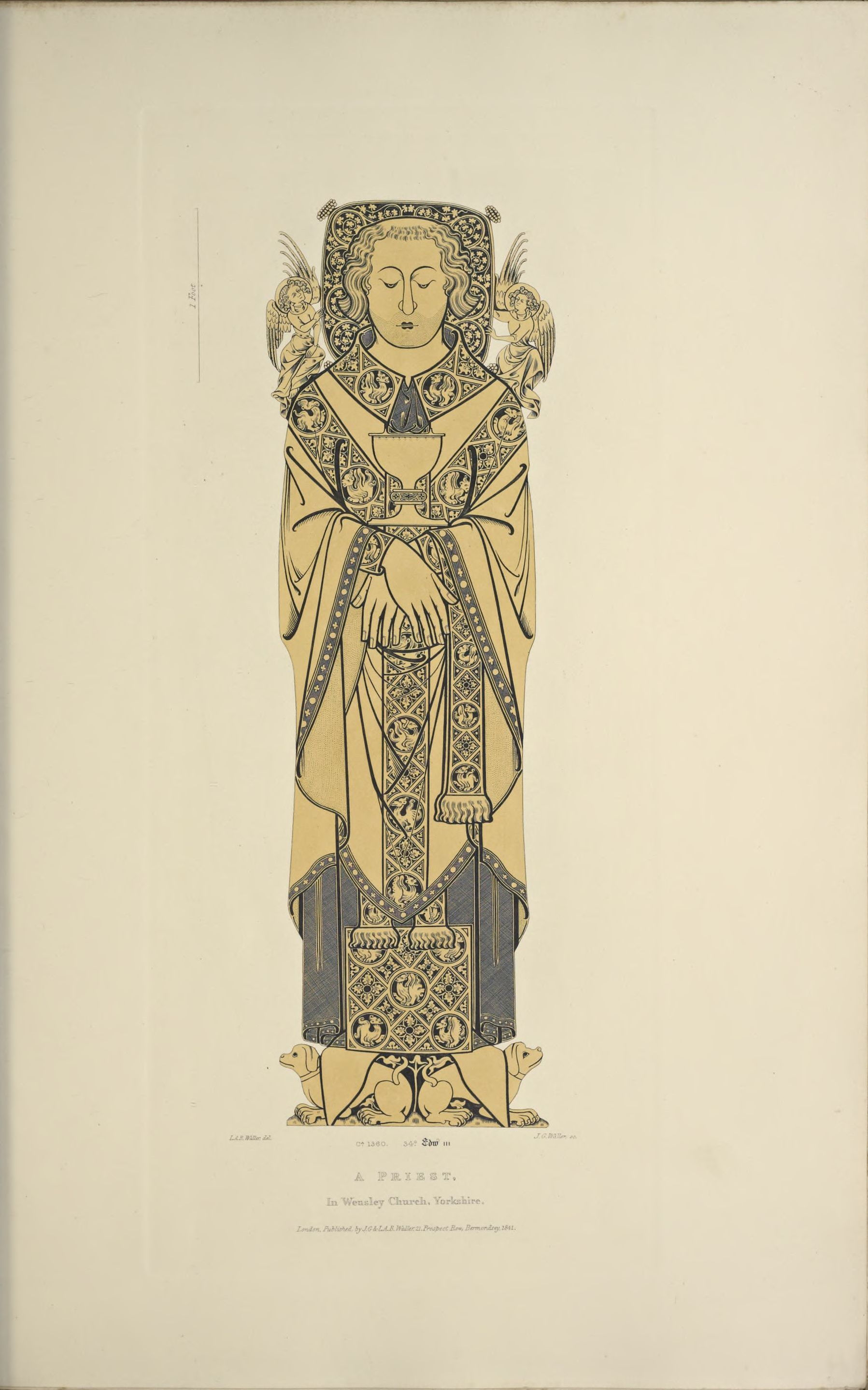
Monumental brass to a priest, c. 1360

== See also ==
- Grade I listed buildings in North Yorkshire (district)
- Listed buildings in Wensley, North Yorkshire
- List of churches preserved by the Churches Conservation Trust in Northern England
