= Nidderdale National Landscape =

Area of Outstanding Natural Beauty in England

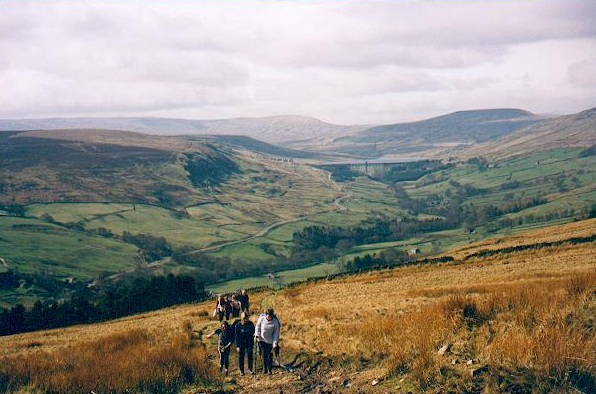
- Upper Nidderdale and Great Whernside

- Location of the Nidderdale AONB in England
- Location: North Yorkshire, England
- Nearest town: Harrogate
- Coordinates: 54°05′12″N 1°45′28″W
- Area: 233 sq mi (600 km^{2})
- Established: 1994
- Website: https://nidderdale-nl.org.uk/

The Nidderdale National Landscape is an Area of Outstanding Natural Beauty in North Yorkshire, England, bordering the Yorkshire Dales National Park to the east and south. It comprises most of Nidderdale itself, part of lower Wharfedale, the Washburn valley and part of lower Wensleydale, including Jervaulx Abbey and the side valleys west of the River Ure. It covers a total area of 233 square miles (600 km^{2}). The highest point in the Nidderdale AONB is Great Whernside, 704 metres (2,310 ft) above sea level, on the border with the Yorkshire Dales National Park.

The area is said to contain "remains from over 6,000 years of human activity"; there is evidence of "almost continuous settlement over this time with the exception of the Roman period for which evidence is scanty".

According to the AONB, the area "is home to a diverse range of wildlife, important habitats and over 16,000 people". The only town within the AONB is Pateley Bridge in Nidderdale, one of the Yorkshire Dales. Otley and Ilkley lie just to the south of the AONB, and Masham and Ripon are just to the east.

== History ==
In 1947, when the Hobhouse Report recommended the creation of the Yorkshire Dales National Park, it proposed that Nidderdale should be excluded and given a different conservation status. Accordingly, Nidderdale was not included in the National Park when it was designated in 1954. In 1963 the then West Riding County Council proposed that Nidderdale should be added to the National Park, but the proposal met with opposition from the district councils which would have lost some of their powers to the county council. The West Riding National Park Committee, and its successor the Yorkshire Dales National Park Committee, did not entirely abandon the idea until 1988, when the alternative AONB designation was proposed.

The eastern boundary of the National Park had been set at East Witton, as recommended by the Hobhouse Report. The section of Wensleydale below East Witton had not been considered for national park status, but was added to the new AONB. Similarly, the new AONB also included the Washburn Valley and the area of lower Wharfedale between the Washburn Valley and the National Park, which had not been considered for national park status. The AONB was designated in 1994 with its current boundaries.

On 22 November 2023, following the Glover Review, the AONB adopted the Nidderdale National Landscape name.

== Geography ==
=== Nidderdale ===
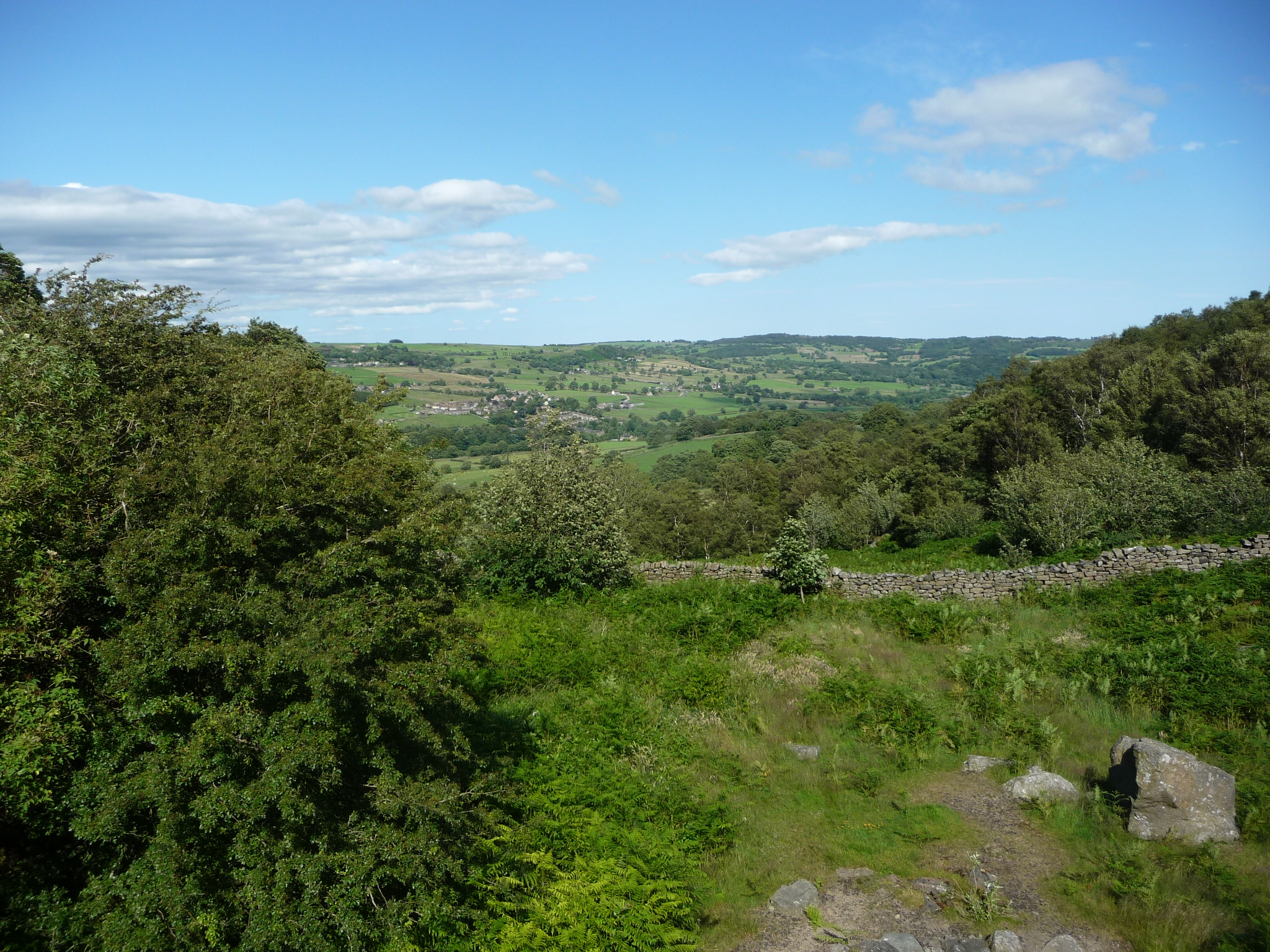
Countryside near Pateley Bridge

The AONB includes all of Nidderdale except a small area in the lower dale around Hampsthwaite. In the lower dale, below Pateley Bridge, attractions include Brimham Rocks and the Coldstones Cut. In the less populated upper dale there are a series of reservoirs, Gouthwaite Reservoir (a nature reserve), Scar House Reservoir and at the very top of the dale Angram Reservoir, dominated by Great Whernside and Little Whernside.

=== Lower Wharfedale and the Washburn Valley ===
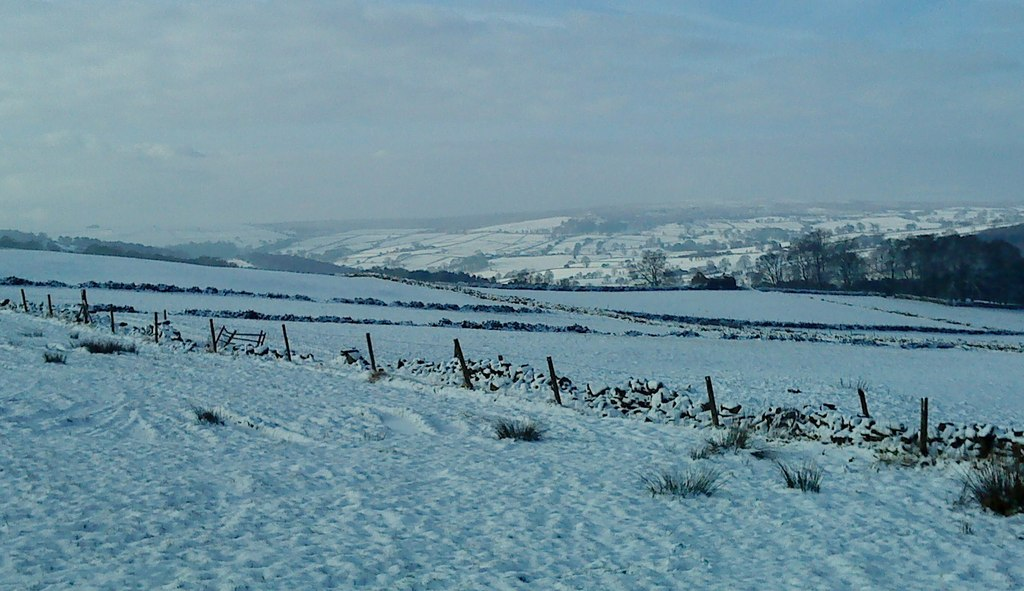
Washburn Valley in winter

The southern part of the AONB includes the reservoirs of the Washburn Valley, Lindley Wood, Swinsty, Fewston and Thruscross.

=== Lower Wensleydale and side valleys ===
The eastern part of the AONB includes the valleys of the River Burn (including Colsterdale), River Laver and River Skell. Fountains Abbey and Jervaulx Abbey both lie within the AONB, and Hackfall Wood is on the south bank of the River Ure.

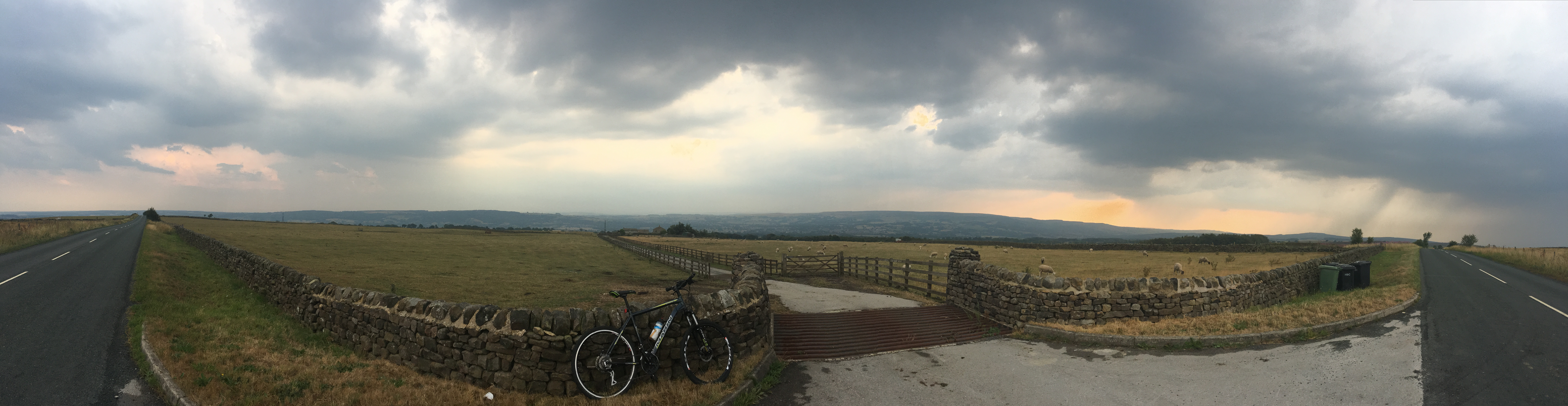
Overlooking Lower Wharfedale just North of Otley (which is to the left). Ilkley Moor is in the background

== Tourism ==
The AONB can be reached by bus from Harrogate to Pateley Bridge, by train to Harrogate, and by highway: "A1(M) and the A61 to the east, and the A65, A59, M65 and M62 to the south".

The AONB supports the tourism sector in line with the Dales Tourism Strategy & Action Plan for sustainable tourism. In 2013, revenue from tourism within the area was just under £35 million plus "indirect expenditure" by visitors of about £20 million.

Walking is a popular activity. The AONB Web site provides directions for popular walks, but also offers information on canoeing and kayaking, caving, climbing, cycling, fishing and horse riding. Three long-distance trails traverse the AONB, the Nidderdale Way up and down Nidderdale from south east to north west, the Six Dales Trail from Otley in the south to Wensleydale in the north, and the Yorkshire Heritage Way from Wharfedale in the south to Ripon in the north. Upper Nidderdale is a popular area for mountain biking, and caving takes place in the Upper Nidderdale caves.

The grouse moors on the higher land offer some of the best shooting in the United Kingdom. One source states that grouse shooting is primarily an activity for the wealthy; in 2008, the activity contributed "more than £600,000 in wages for people such as gamekeepers and beaters, £250,000 to local businesses such as pubs and guest houses, and around £1.75million for land management". The season runs from 12 August to 10 December.

== Governance ==
Like most AONBs, and unlike national parks, the Nidderdale AONB is managed by local authorities through the Joint Advisory Committee, "a partnership organisation made up of elected representatives from the local authority and parish councils, and representatives from landowning and community interest groups". A small team based at Pateley Bridge reports to the JAC.

The entire AONB is within North Yorkshire, and since 1 April 2023 North Yorkshire Council has been lead authority for the AONB. Almost all of Nidderdale AONB is within the area of the former Borough of Harrogate. Small areas of land to the north are within the former Richmondshire and Hambleton districts.
