= William Grainge =

19th-century English historian

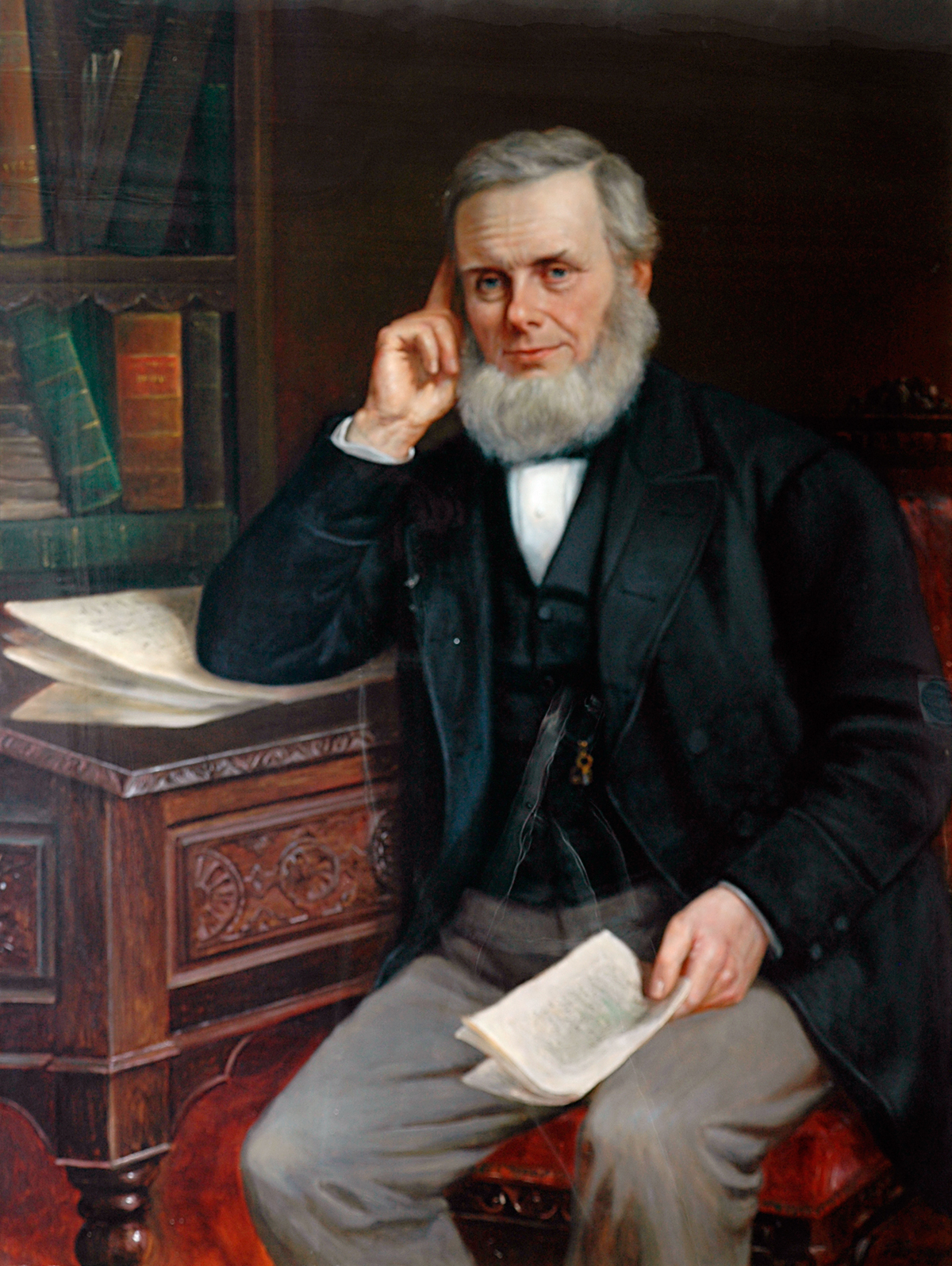
- William Grainge, 1870
- Born: 25 January 1818; Dishforth, England
- Died: 29 September 1895 (aged 77); Harrogate, England
- Education: Self-educated
- Occupations: Historian, writer
- Writing career
- Language: English
- Subject: Yorkshire history

William Grainge (25 January 1818 – 29 September 1895) was an English antiquarian and poet, and a historian of Yorkshire. He was born into a farming family in Dishforth and grew up on Castiles Farm near Kirkby Malzeard in the North Riding of Yorkshire, where he studied the archaeological site beneath the farm buildings, now known as Cast Hills settlement. Although he left school at age 12, he educated himself well enough to become a clerk to a solicitors' firm in Boroughbridge. He later established a bookshop in Harrogate and published numerous books on local history and topography, besides publishing a number of anonymous poems and discourses about local natural history.

Grainge befriended the young John Farrah, and taught him botany and other natural history. Farrah was a grocer and an amateur botanist, who went on to become a Fellow of The Linnean Society and chairman of Yorkshire Naturalists' Union. After Grainge died, Farrah gave a lecture about Grainge's life and works, and later wrote a tribute to him. Most of what we know about Grainge's life comes from Farrah.

== Life ==
=== Castiles ===
On Monday 2 December 1895, soon after William Grainge died, the Harrogate Field Naturalists' and Camera Club met to hear a lecture by their past president, Yorkshire naturalist John Farrah (1849–1907), about the man's life and career. Farrah said that although Grainge was born at Dishforth on 25 January 1818 his parents (farmer Thomas Grainge (c.1771 – Stokesley 1841 or 1845) (Note: Deaths Sep 1841 Grainge Thomas Stokesley XXIV 324) and Elizabeth Chapman (Hutton Rudby c.1778 – Ripon 1867)) (Note: England Census 1841 HO/107/1285/6 p.19, Castiles) (Note: Deaths Sep 1867 Grainge Elizabeth 90 Ripon 9a 56) had taken over the family property, Castiles Farm near Kirkby Malzeard, by the following March. Grainge was the youngest heir of that family, and Castiles was where he grew up, and where his once-yeoman family had farmed for three centuries. Grainge attended Kirkby Malzeard village school, leaving at age 12 to work on the farm for fifteen years. He was otherwise self-taught. While working "he employed every moment of his leisure time gathering scientific knowledge". He would carry pocket volumes of Dove's Classics; "when those around him rested or slept, he read". (Note: Dove's English Classics were published by John Fowler Dove (1787-1866) of St John’s Square in Clerkenwell. There were at least 80 titles in the series. Authors included Francis Bacon, John Bunyan, Edmund Burke, etc. For further information, see Dove's English Classics)

=== Boroughbridge ===
Grainge's father Thomas died in 1841 or 1845. By 1851 Grainge was a solicitor's writing clerk, living with his widowed mother Elizabeth in Minskip. (Note: England Census 1851 HO/107/2282 p.17, Minskip) In 1845, at the age of 27 Grainge became clerk to Boroughbridge solicitor Mr Hirst (later Hirst & Capes), remaining there for fourteen years and producing his first publication, The History of Aldborough and Boroughbridge, in 1853, although he was not credited as author, because "his modesty would not permit of it". This was followed by three more works written at Boroughbridge: Battles and Battlefields (1854), Castles and Abbeys (1855) and Vale of Mowbray (1859).

=== Harrogate ===
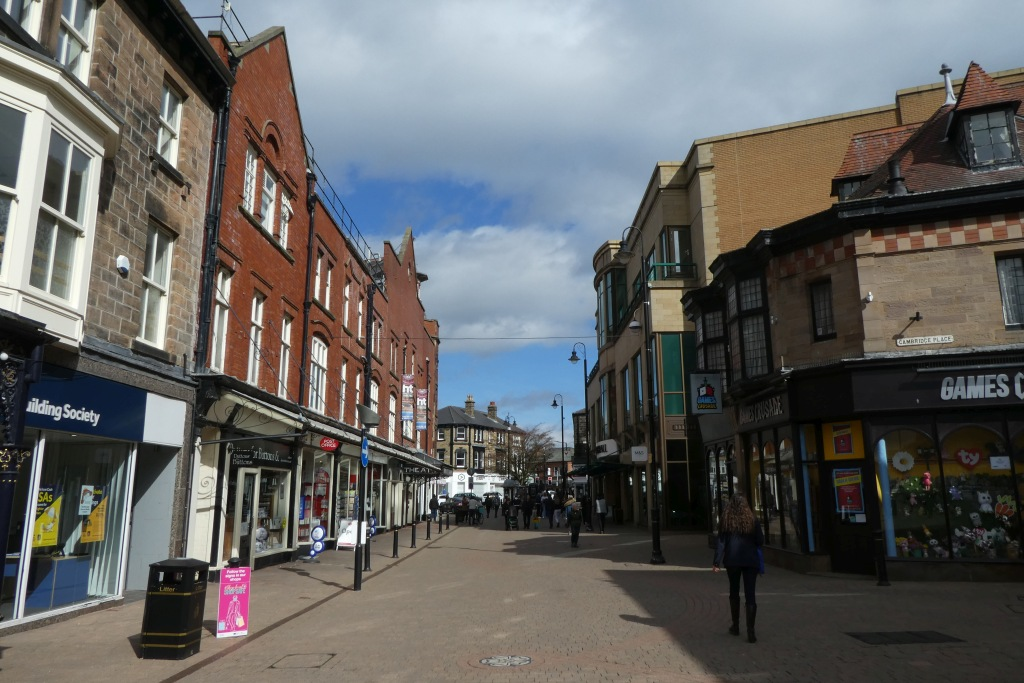
Oxford Street (previously Chapel Street), Harrogate. If the street numbers are unchanged, then the building on the far left is Grainge's former bookshop.

Grainge married Mary Chapman (Minskip c.1829 – Harrogate 1908) (Note: Deaths Dec 1908 Grainge Mary. 80 Knaresbro' 9a 73) in 1855 at Great Ouseburn. (Note: Marriages Mar 1855 Grainge William and Chapman Mary Gt Ouseburn 9a 89) They had three children all born in Minskip: Elizabeth (born c.1856) who assisted in the stationery shop; Thomas (born c.1858) a railway clerk; and Ann Bentley nee Grainge (born c.1860) a dressmaker. (Note: See England Census 1891 RG12/3520 p.3 schedule 5, 3 Northumberland Terrace, Harrogate) The 1861 and 1871 censuses find the family living at 1 Cheltenham Place, Harrogate. (Note: England Census 1861 RG9/3207 p.29 schedule 18, 1 Cheltenham Place) (Note: England Census 1871 RG10/4290 p.30, 1 Cheltenham Place) In 1881 Grainge and his family were living in Chapel Street, Harrogate. (Note: England Census 1881 RG11/4327 p.30, Chapel St) However, according to Farrah, in 1860 Grainge opened a shop in Baker Lane (later Walker Road) in Harrogate, selling books and stationery. He later opened a shop in Chapel street, converting the Walker Road shop into a private house called Ripon House. There he wrote what he believed to be the first History of Harrogate and the Forest of Knaresborough (1871), published, like many of his other local histories, by subscription. Although Grainge had left Hirst & Capes, he remained able to act in a legal capacity. In 1886 he was granted letters of administration in respect of the will of Isabella Mason (died 1885) and Isabella's sister Jane Deighton.

=== Death ===
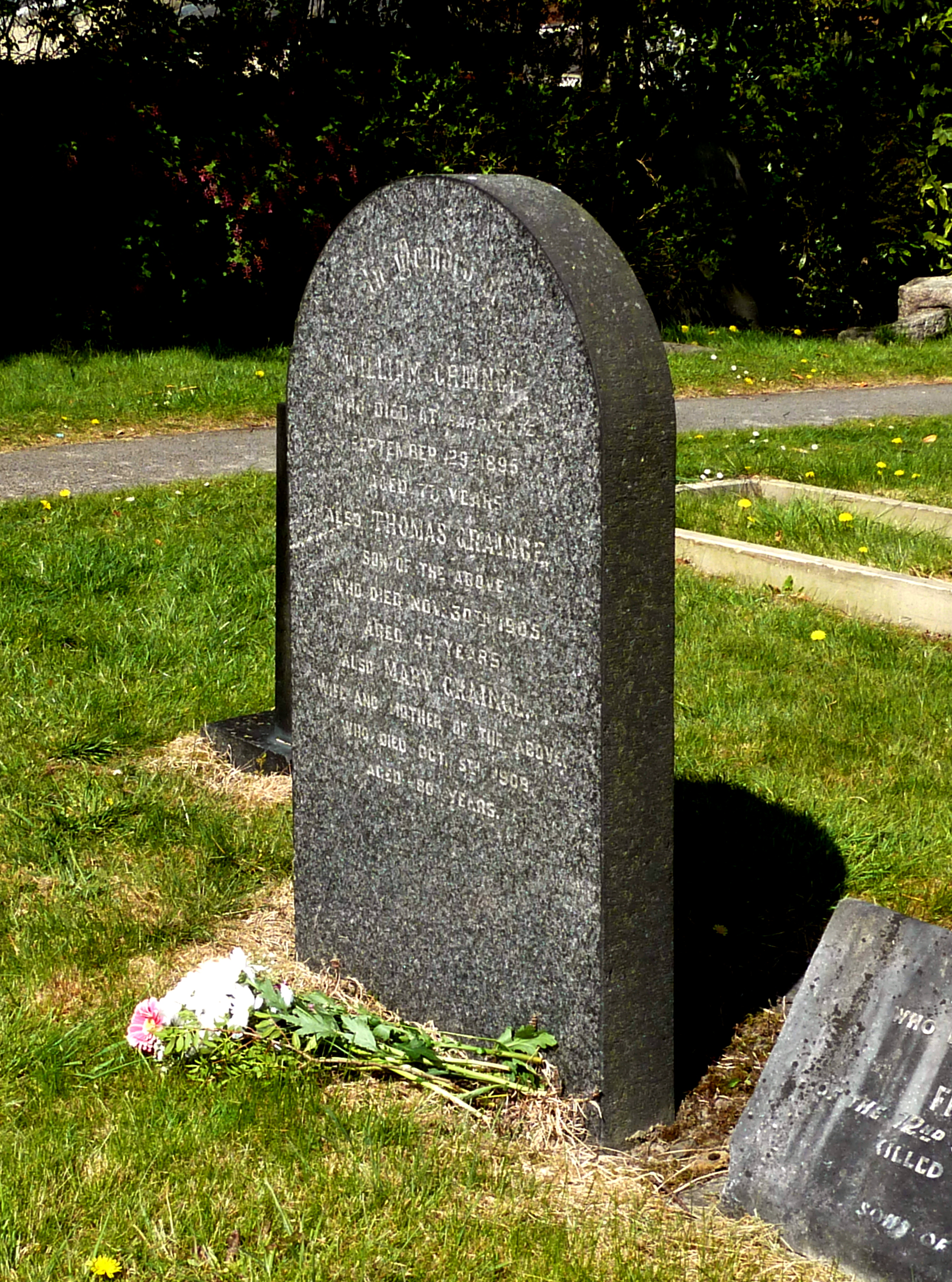
Grainge's gravestone

Grainge died in number 12 Chapel Street, Harrogate, on 29 September 1895. (Note: Chapel Street was renamed Oxford Street in 1908. If the street numbering has not changed, then Grainge's shop premises are now (as of 2021) occupied by Leeds Building Society in 12 Oxford Street, Harrogate.) "For a month previous he had been confined to the house, but the glorious sunshine tempted him out. During the day he continued to feel better, but after returning at night his heart failed, and he passed away peacefully." He was buried in Grove Road Cemetery, Harrogate. (Note: William Grainge was interred in grave 1331 in section D of Grove Road Cemetery, Harrogate. It is a plain headstone with a semicircular top edge.)

== Character ==
Grainge was a practical and outdoor antiquarian and naturalist, and took John Farrah under his wing as a student and assistant:

[They] tramped together hundreds of miles ... Mr Grainge possessed the happy knack of drawing persons into conversation when he took his long journeys on foot. Many thousands of miles must he have walked alone (yet never alone) in search of information. Very seldom indeed had he any other conveyance except the two stout legs with which nature had blessed him. If the distance to the district was a long one he rode, but the moment his researches commenced the conveyance was abandoned. He avoided walking on the highway when he could help it, always kept clear of a crowd, and was the happiest when alone with the subject he had in hand. He was not only an antiquarian, for every object in nature afforded him the greatest delight.

=== Grainge and Farrah ===
John Farrah F.L.S., F.R.Met.S, was a baker, a grocer, an amateur botanist, a "great Yorkshire character", and chairman of Yorkshire Naturalists' Union in 1906. He said that he knew Grainge, "better than anyone else, even better than the members of [Grainge's] family in a scientific sense". They first met when Farrah was a boy, purchasing books from his bookshop. The regular April–September Sunday walks taken by Grainge and Farrah began in 1873, when Farrah was about twenty-four years old, and Grainge was fifty-five. An average walk would be a 24-mile-long (39 km) round trip. On summer evenings after work, they would walk over Harlow Moor to Birk Crag. With Grainge, Farrah first heard the nightjar's buzzing call. A favourite trip was to the Magnesian Limestone slope of Rig Moor, travelling via rail to Nidd Bridge, then walking through Nidd Park, Brearton, a green lane, and fields. On the moor "they found numerous variety of plants delightful to the botanist". After Grainge died, Farrah wrote a Tribute to him, describing their friendship and listing Grainge's publications.

A large portrait (pictured above) of Grainge hangs in Harrogate library. The painting was presented to Harrogate Field Naturalists' and Camera Club in the late 1890s by John Farrah. It moved to Harrogate library in 1916 when it was presented by Farrah's son Joseph.

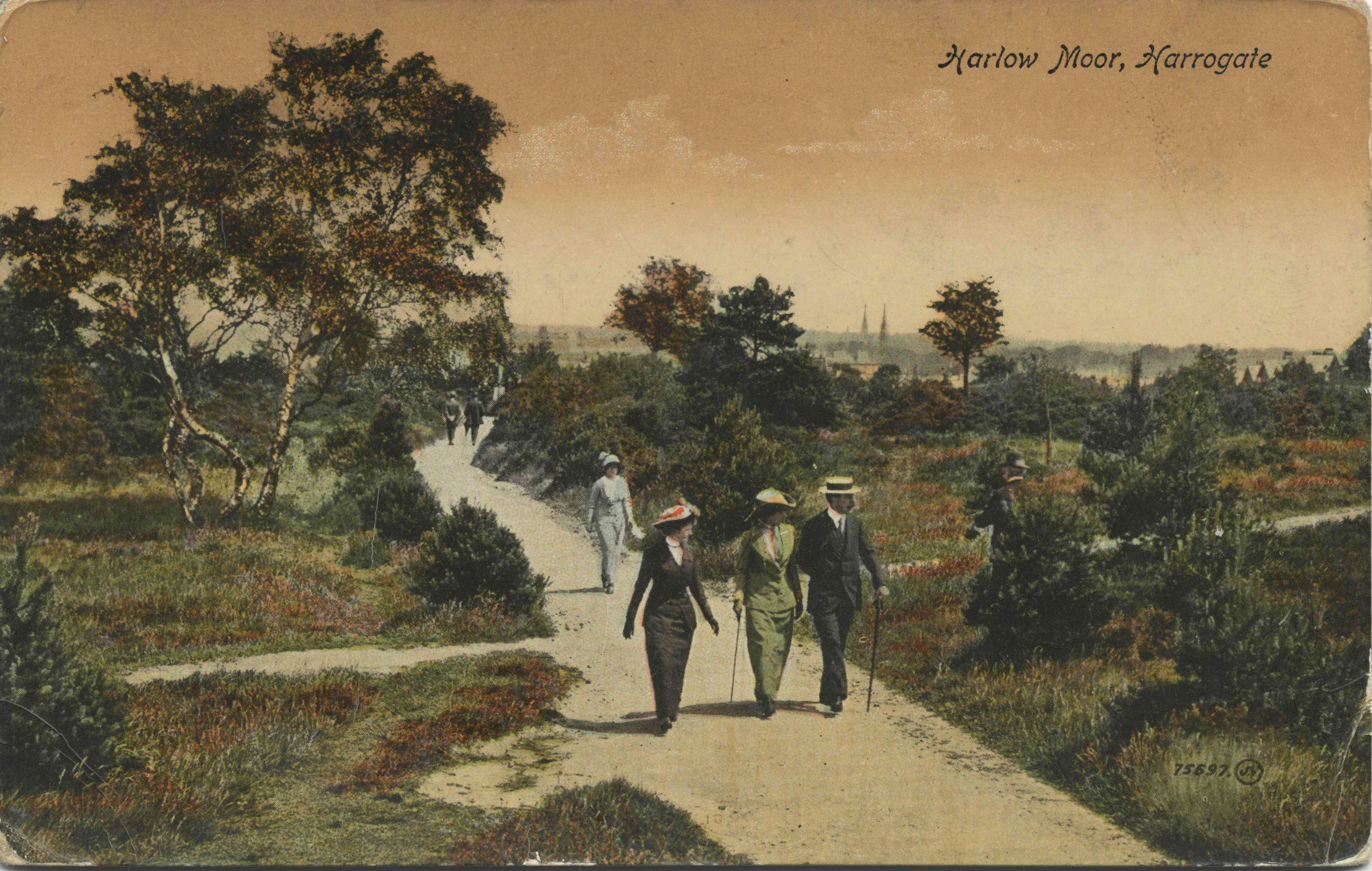
Grainge and Farrah used to walk via Harlow Moor ...

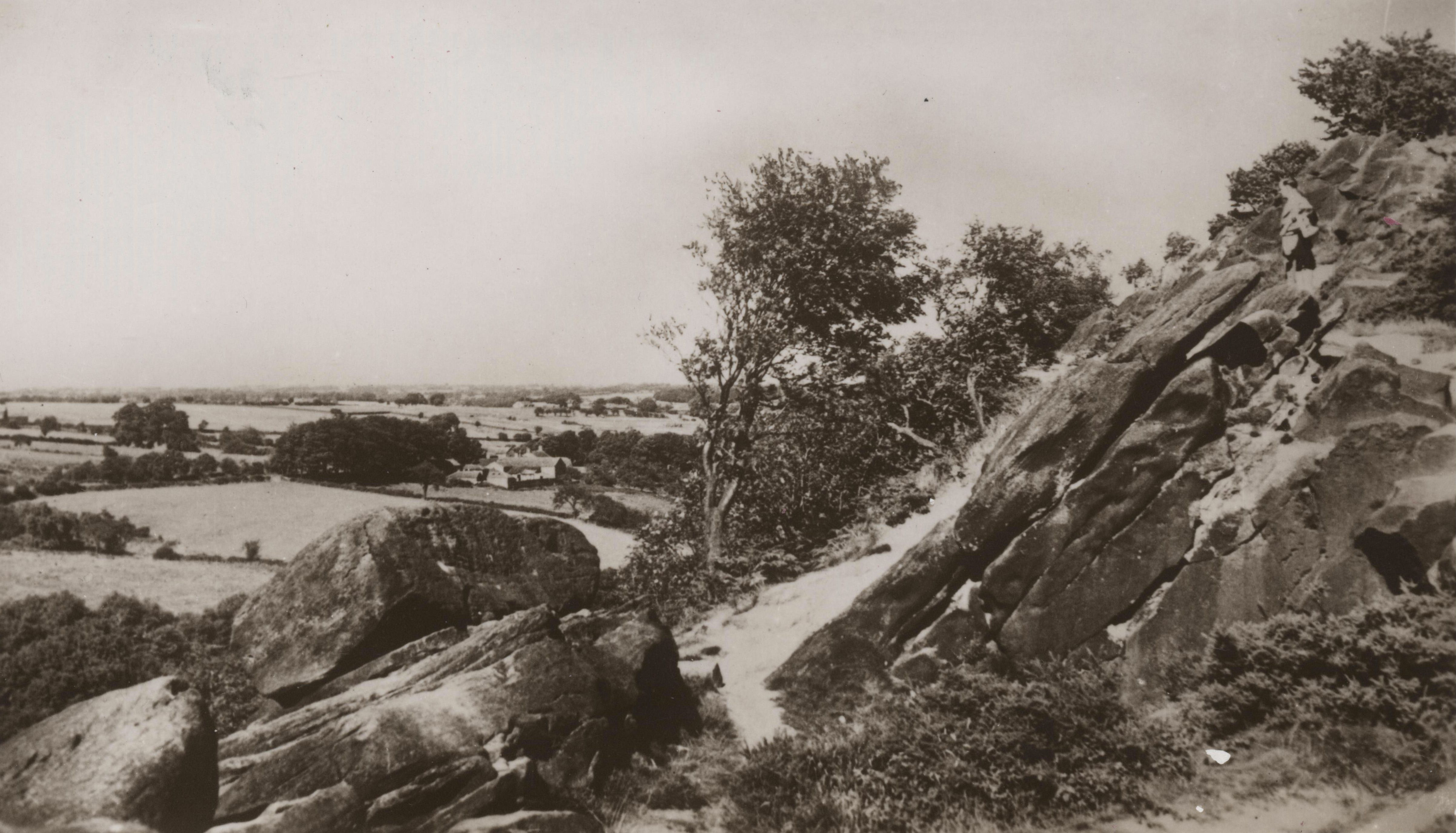
... to Birk Crag

== Archaeology and research ==
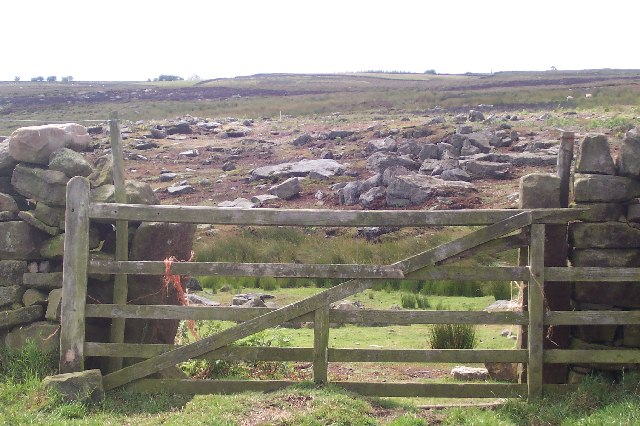
Castiles, or Cast Hills settlement, showing ditch and central stone rampart

Castiles, Grainge's family farm, is an archaeological site. Farrah described it thus in 1895:

Castiles is the site of a military camp, and is one of the largest British earthworks to be found in Yorkshire; here Mr. Grainge spent the first 27 years of his life. He surveyed and studied every detail of these extensive earthworks, eventually drawing a plan, explaining every portion. Here he had at his own door one of the most interesting fields for research, and one that coincided exactly with his taste ... The writing of [his] books entailed an amount of labour, mental and physical, which few men were capable of; all the matter was collected by himself exclusively; parish registers and other documents were searched most carefully, and thus a large number of interesting facts was unearthed and rescued from oblivion.

Although, according to Farrah, Grainge saw Castiles as a military camp, saying it also "bore evidence of having been the scene of Druidical worship", today's archaeologists see it differently. It is now known as Cast Hills settlement, which extends beneath Castiles farm house and beneath the buildings across the road to the south of it. It also extends to the south and to the north-east of those buildings. Heritage Gateway describes it as an Iron Age settlement which is protective, but not defensive. The site is now damaged, but it had a "central circular rampart of stone surrounded by a large irregular area, enclosed by a trench". There is no public access, but "25 earthfast boulders and a boundary ditch" can be seen over the wall near Castiles farm house, from the Laverton–Pateley Bridge road. It is possible that Grainge mistook a settlement with a rampart for a military camp, however just under 2 miles (3.22 kilometres) to the west of Castiles is Fortress Dyke, described as "a probable Iron Age/Romano-British square enclosure surviving as an earthwork", and Farrah - a naturalist, not an antiquarian - may have conflated the two sites. (Note: There is a picture of Fortress Dyke here: File:Fortress Dike - geograph.org.uk - 312222.jpg) Grainge is likely to have visited Fortress Dyke, because while at Castiles "alone he explored all the valleys, woods, glens and ravines within half-a-dozen miles of his home".

In 1850, after Grainge had left Castiles, his relatives Edwin and John Grainge had moved to Bramley Grange. When peat-digging there, they found Grewelthorpe Man, a bog man, of whom only the stockings and sandals survived to be passed on to the Museum of the Philosophical Society. Grainge was able to describe "sandals of a finely artistic shape" in his Millenary of 1892.

== Poetry ==
From 1834 when he was sixteen, Grainge's poetry was published anonymously in York and Leeds newspapers. The verses covered a variety of subjects. He produced "about two hundred pieces of poetry" in all.

== Local influence ==
When the Leeds Corporation Waterworks was under construction in the Washburn Valley, local property owners sued Leeds Corporation for damages following a landslip at Fewston. However, Grainge's History of the Forest of Knaresborough "showed conclusively that landslips occurred in the neighbourhood long before operations were commenced in connection with the Leeds waterworks", and that won the case for Leeds Corporation.

== Obituaries ==
Grainge's obituary in the Globe said:

[His] reputation as historian of Yorkshire, archaeologist and naturalist, was more than local. His works on geology, and on the castles and abbeys of Yorkshire, showed much research and care, his Poets and Poetry of Yorkshire became very popular, and he also dealt with the battles and the battlefields of the county. He was also an eminent botanist, and an authority on all antiquarian matters in the Harrogate district.

The West Somerset Free Press said:

One of the little regarded but invaluable company of local historians has been removed by the death of Mr William Grainge, of Harrogate, at the age of 77. A stationer by trade he devoted all his leisure to the history and topography of his county, and from time to time produced a number of books on the subject, which are held in high esteem in archaeological circles ... He was a naturalist of considerable standing, and a close observer and methodical chronicler of physical phenomena.

J.H. Lofthouse, the president of the Harrogate Field Naturalists' and Camera Club, said that,

Like many other men of genius, Mr Grainge was very little known, and, he was afraid, very little appreciated by the people of Harrogate and district. Men of genius who happened to be in humble circumstances very seldom were appreciated until it was too late for that appreciation to be any benefit to them. He thought that future generations would probably appreciate Mr. Grainge's efforts more than the present one.

== Selected works ==
=== History ===
- "On the tumuli at North Deighton", "A visit to Claro Hill" and "A visit to Aldborough, the Roman Isubrigantum", in John Burniston's magazine Northern Summary (Knaresborough, 1849).
- The Battles and Battle Fields of Yorkshire (1854).
- The Castles and Abbeys of Yorkshire: a historical and descriptive account of the most celebrated ruins in the county (1855).
- An Historic and Descriptive account of Swinsty Hall (1857).
- Vale of Mowbray: a historical and topographical account of Thirsk and its neighbourhood (1859).
- Guide to Harrogate (1860).
- Memoir of Sir William Slingsby (1862).
- The History of Nidderdale (1863).
- The Tourist's Guide to Brimham Rocks (1863).
- Geology of Harrogate (1864).
- Three Wonderful Yorkshire Characters: namely, Henry Jenkins, Blind Jack i.e. John Metcalf of Knaresborough and Peg Wharton (1864).
- Yorkshire Longevity : or, records and biographical anecdotes of persons who have attained to extreme old age within the County (1864).
- A History of Knaresborough (1865).
- The Scottish Pedlar (a legend) (1866).
- Swinsty Hall: its History etc. (1867).
- Rambles on Rombald's Moor (1868).
- History and Topography of Harrogate and the Forest of Knaresborough (1871, 1873).
- Annals of a Yorkshire Abbey: A Popular History of the Famous Monastery of Fountains (1880).
- Ripon Millenary, a Record of the Festival. Also a history of the city, arranged under its wakemen and mayors from the year 1400 (1892).
- Geology of Harrogate (1895).
- History & Topography of Little Timble, Great Timble & Snowden (1895). (Published on Grainge's last birthday, 25 January 1895).
- Some of the Walks and Footpaths Around Harrogate: Described and arranged in the form of short excursions (1903).
- Demonologia : A Discourse on Witchcraft as It Was Acted in the Family of Mr. Edward Fairfax (1882).
- Sixpenny Book of Views of Harrogate and District (before 1893).

=== Poets and poetry ===
- The Poets and Poetry of Yorkshire. Comprising Biographical Notices of the Most Eminent Poets, Natives of the County of York. with Extracts from Their Writings, Etc. (two volumes, 1868).

=== Other works ===
Besides the above publications, Grainge left a number of manuscripts and lecture-notes, and partial histories of villages of the North Riding of Yorkshire. Some of these were published in the Leeds Mercury, Yorkshire Post, Harrogate Advertiser and Harrogate Herald under the name of "Forester".

== Reviews ==
- "Of Memoir of the Life of William Slingsby, Knt, Discoverer of the First Spa at Harrogate: [Grainge] shows that "the date of this discovery", which, "is generally fixed in 1576", is "probably twenty or more years too early, as at that time Slingsby would only be fourteen years of age, and could not have travelled much in Germany or elsewhere". Sir William's discovery, as Mr. Grainge expresses it, "has been the means of converting the uncultivated, unpeopled wilderness into a large and elegant town, the permanent abode of nearly 5,000 inhabitants, and annually, during the summer months, the resort of at least 20,000 more; adorned with pump-rooms, churches, elegant villas, sumptuous hotels, and long streets of substantial dwellings"". (Bury Times 1862).
- Of The History and Topography of Harrogate and the Forest of Knaresborough: "The district of which this volume treats was formerly known as the Royal Forest of Knaresborough, and of which no previous history can be said to exist. In this work a detailed account is given of each place, from the earliest known times to the present day, chiefly derived from materials never before published. Pedigrees are given of the principal landowners in the district – both ancient and modern; and pains have been taken to collect notices of eminent individuals and families connected with the district, some of which have been little known to the public. Besides what may be termed as the political, civil and ecclesiastical history of the district, sketches of the physical history and geology are given, principally derived from the author's personal observations, made during the last ten years".{Knaresborough Post, 1873)
- Of the Demonologia: "Extraordinary as it may appear, considering the ability and reputation of the writer – the nature of the subject – the eager curiosity of mankind for the wonderful, and apparently supernatural – and the length of time which has elapsed since this treatise was written – this is the first time that this work of the learned translator of Tasso's Jerusalem Delivered has been fairly offered to the general public, the previous publication being only for the members of "The Philbiblion Society". To the students of human nature this work cannot fail to be highly interesting, as it gives the most minute and graphic account from day to day of the symptoms of witchcraft that has ever been written thus giving a clear insight into the most singular piece of credulity that ever afflicted the human race. The author at the same time, in language pure and simple, gives us a faithful picture of the mode of life, manners and customs of the lower order of gentry of that period, in England such as can hardly be found elsewhere." (Quoted from: Pateley Bridge and Nidderdale Herald, 1882).
