= Washburn Valley =

Valley in the North Yorkshire, England

- Washburn Dale; Washburndale
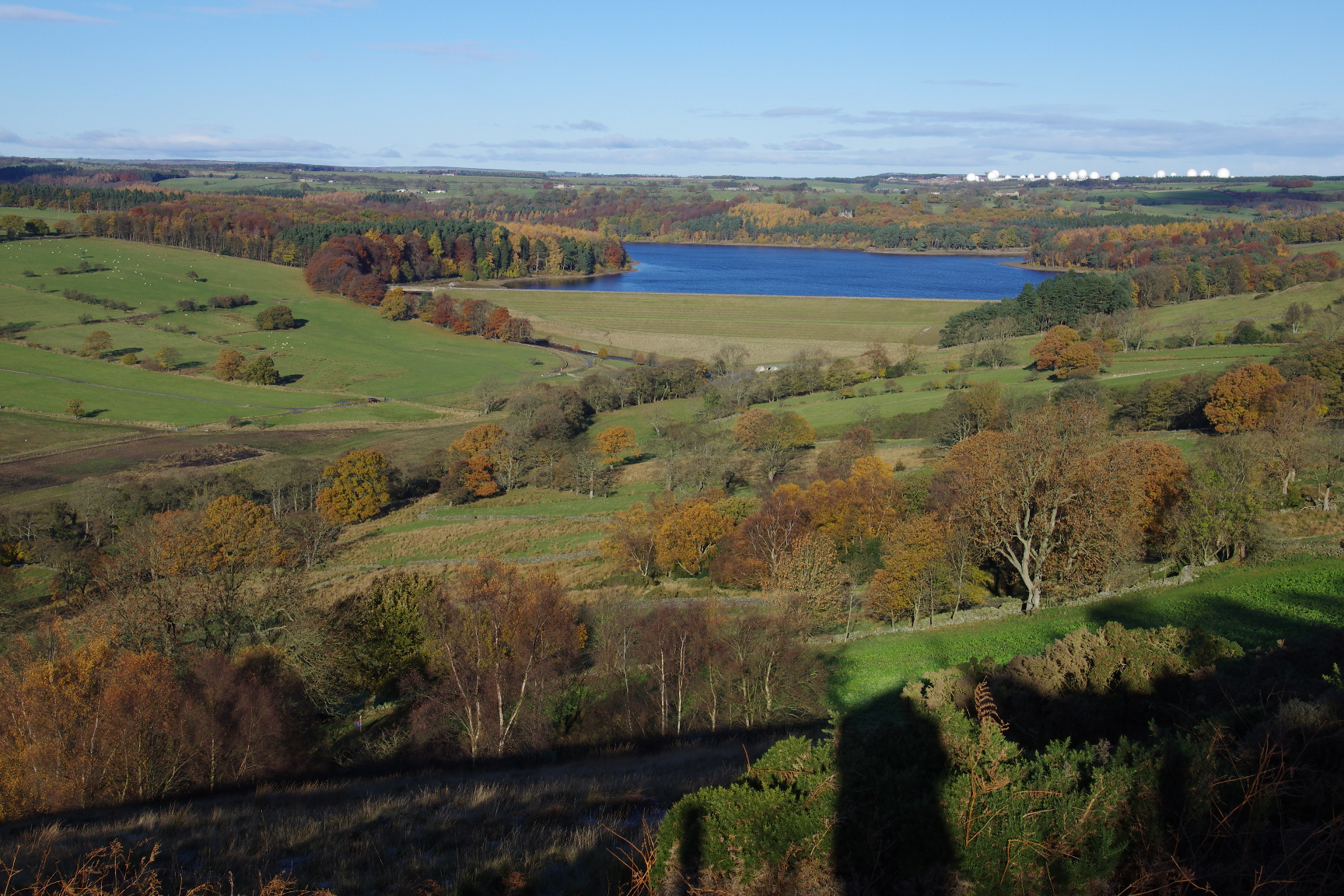
- Swinsty Reservoir and Washburn Valley; the radar domes of RAF Menwith Hill are on the horizon
- Length: 16 mi (26 km) North-west to south-east

Geography
- Location: North Yorkshire
- Country: England
- Coordinates: 53.986°N 1.724°W
- River: River Washburn
- Interactive map of Washburn Valley

The Washburn Valley is a 16-mile (26 km) long dale in North Yorkshire, England. Although adjacent to the Yorkshire Dales National Park, the valley is not classed as one of the dales and is actually located within the Nidderdale AONB. The valley was historically in the West Riding of Yorkshire, but has been within North Yorkshire since 1974. The valley's main river is the Washburn which has been adapted for water storage and is host to four reservoirs which were originally built to supply water to Leeds. The presence of four large reservoirs led to the valley being referred to as the "Leeds' Lake District".

== History ==
The name of the river is first recorded in 1130 as Walkesburne and derives from the Old English of a personal name and the word burna, meaning Walc's stream. The river name, besides lending its name to the valley, also influenced a surname (Washburn or Washburne), which is not to be confused with Washbourne or Washborne which originated in Devon and Gloucestershire. The valley is most often referred to as Washburn Valley, with Washburndale being an older term for the valley. The river rises near Craven Cross on Pockstones Moor and Greenhow Hill, flowing for over 16 miles (26 km) to its mouth on the River Wharfe just to the south of Leathley.

Kendall and Wroot postulated the theory that the Washburn Valley was at some point a huge lake with its waters held back by a glacier around the area of the present River Wharfe in the Leathley area. Some water escaped eastwards via what is now the Oak Beck. Brandrith Crags on the western side of the valley above Thruscross Reservoir is said to have been a place where druids worshipped, and further down the valley are there areas of marked rocks dating back to the Neolithic era or Bronze Age, all being scheduled monuments. Mesolithic and Neolithic remains have been found in the Leathley Bridge area, which is bounded to the south by the River Wharfe, and to the east by the River Washburn.

Some settlements are listed in the Domesday Book, most are not (see table below), and large parts of the dale, especially in the upper valley, formed the Forest of Knaresborough, with the river forming the southern boundary of the royal forest in its lower reaches. The dale was a favoured hunting ground of the Plantagenet monarchs. One of the more notable lords of the manor of Knaresborough, which covered the Washburn Valley, was Hugh de Morville, who was one of the four knights who murdered Thomas Becket. By the 14th century, farming developed in the valley when the hunting areas were less well-used. Historically, the area was in the wapentake of Claro, and the ancient parish of Fewston covered a large part of the valley. Many of the settlements in the lower valley were part of the Wharfedale Rural district between 1894 and 1974, and the upper valley was part of the Ripon & Pateley Bridge Rural District. These were all in the old West Riding of Yorkshire, but moved into North Yorkshire in 1974.

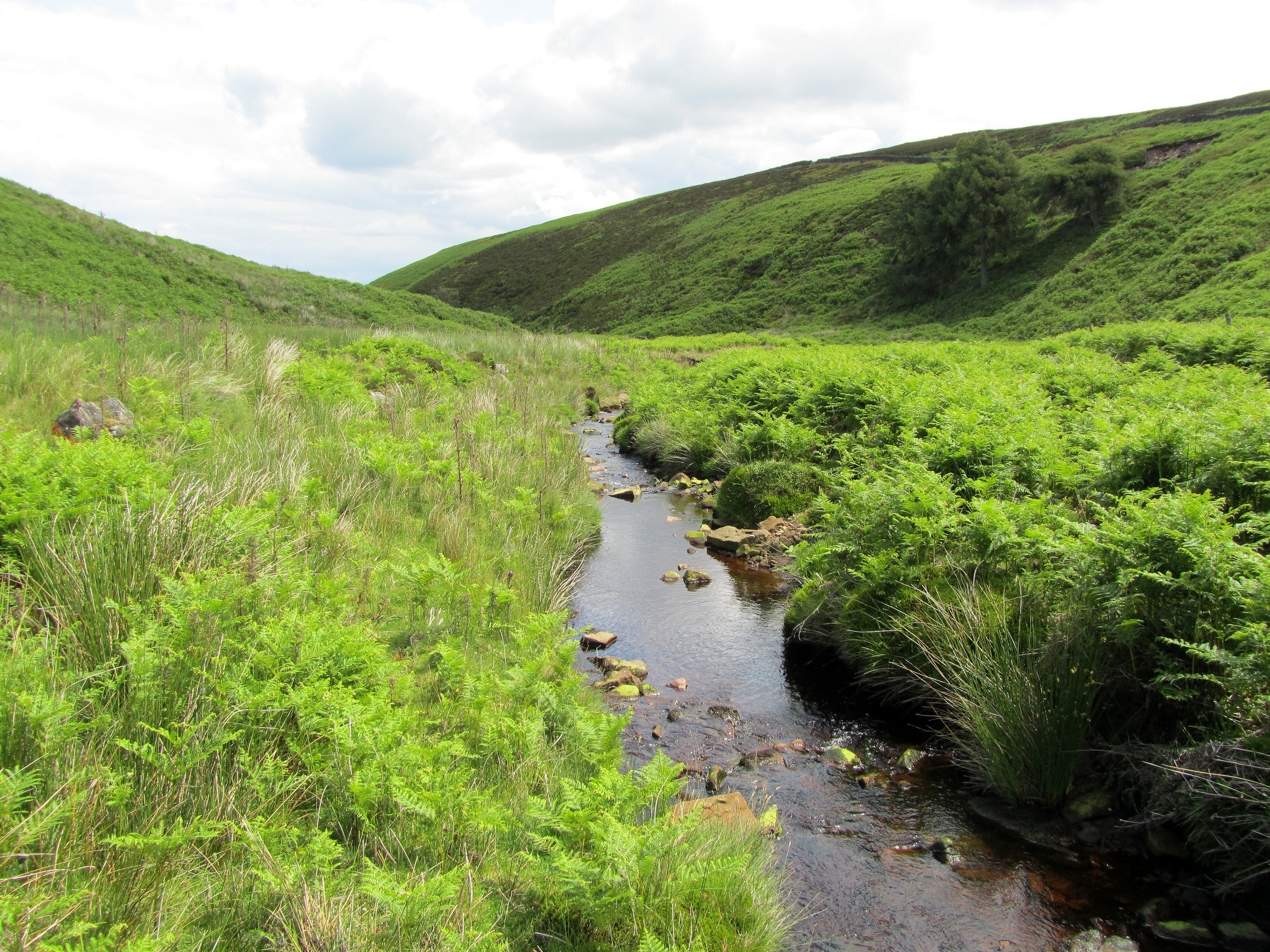
Upper Reaches of the River Washburn

The embattlement of John of Gaunt's Castle in Haverah Park (east of Swinsty Reservoir) has been described as being in "Washburndale". The castle was built in the 14th century by Edward III, but the high ground it occupies drains mostly eastwards towards Oak Beck rather than the Washburn Valley.

The first reference to a mill comes in 1526 when permission was given to build a fulling mill on the river in Fewston township. A record from 1791 shows how some traders based in Otley bought the corn mill on the river at Thruscross. During the late 18th and early 19th century, several mills were opened to take advantage of the power of the river. Mapping before the reservoirs were built show several mills in the valley. At West End, now largely under Thruscross Reservoir, were three cotton mills; Low Mill, High Mill and Little Mill. The textile mills suffered in the 1830s/1840s due to a depression in the market; other areas were better in competing for customers the price of flax from Russia was cheaper and cotton prices plummeted due to a high tariff applied by the French government. Several mills stopped work, and saw some areas de-populated. The population of Fewston more than halved from 850 to 399, Thruscross had a similar rate of de-population down from an estimated 700/650 to 339, and according to the curate at West End church, the population their decreased by a third on account of the mill closing. There have been historical references to children being ill-treated in the mills in the Washburn Valley but very little evidence has been shown for this. West House Mill is thought to have collapsed in 1870, long after it had been vacated and left derelict.

Water bodies in the Washburn Valley - upstream to downstream
Waterbody name	Built	Storage	Ref
Blow Tarn	N/A		
Thruscross Reservoir	1966	7,658,484 cubic metres (270,456,800 cu ft)	
Fewston Reservoir	1879	3,704,754 cubic metres (130,832,200 cu ft)	
Swinsty Reservoir	1876	4,108,676 cubic metres (145,096,500 cu ft)	
Lindley Wood Reservoir	1875	2,048,503 cubic metres (72,342,200 cu ft)	
Farnley Lake		212,165 cubic metres (7,492,500 cu ft)	

In the 19th century, the Leeds Corporation built the reservoirs at Fewston, Lindley Wood and Swinsty. The Washburn Valley had been decided upon against other river catchments (the Nidd and the Ure) as they had harder water which would have been problematic for the processing of textiles in the mills of Leeds, whereas the Washburn Valley cuts through a sandstone plateau which was suitable for reservoir building. Whilst land had been acquired for a fourth reservoir at Thruscross, this was not started until the 1960s. Some of the stones from the old mill at Blubberhouses were re-used as a boundary wall around Fewston Reservoir. The creation of the reservoirs along the river led to the valley being dubbed as the "Leeds' Lake District". With much of the land being bought by the Leeds Corporation Waterworks for their reservoir building scheme, a large portion of land within the valley now belongs to the corporation's water works successor; Yorkshire Water. Fewston, Lindley Wood and Swinsty are all earth embankment dams with a puddle clay core, whereas Thruscross is a concrete gravity dam. All apart from Lindley Wood (the lowest of the four) supply water for Leeds; Lindley Wood works as a compensation reservoir to maintain a flow in the river. Farnley Lake is a Site of Importance for Nature Conservation (SINC).

Whilst the Washburn Valley does not form part of the Yorkshire Dales National Park, it is part of the Nidderdale Area of Outstanding Beauty.

== Transport ==
No railways were built in the valley save for smaller concerns for building the reservoirs, but many roads criss-cross the valley. The main artery is actually the west to east A59 road, which connects the middle of the valley with Skipton in the west, and Harrogate to the east. Heading out of the Washburn Valley to the east, the A59 largely follows an old Roman Road between Aldborough and Ilkley; the Roman Road leaves the A59 at Blubberhouses and crosses over Blubberhouses Moor. The A59 west of Blubberhouses has suffered many landslips, and a diversionary route is being built over the original turnpike road to the north of Kex Gill. The original path of the Roman Road goes through the top half of Fewston Reservoir.

A minor road which connects Blubberhouses with Otley was used to transport salt, and came to be known as Psaltergate, though its historical link with the salt trade was forgotten and the road was misnamed with a p at the beginning. The road known as Black gate from Greenhow Hill down the valley to Thruscross was possibly a Roman Road that connected the mines on Greenhow Hill to the Roman Road going west/east across the moors.

The long-distance path the Six Dales Trail passes up the valley from south to north.

== Settlements ==
Besides the settlements listed below, some villages and hamlets were lost when the reservoirs were created (Little Timble, Newhall, Thackray, West End etc.). Farnley, Fewston, Leathley and [Nether] Timble are mentioned in the Domesday Book, as are the smaller areas of Clifton, Elsworth and Estone; all of these are mentioned as belonging to the wapentake of Skyrack. Other locations such as Stainsburn and Leathley were in Burghshire at the Domesday survey, which became part of the Claro Wapentake. Clifton is mentioned in the Domesday Book as having a priest, and a church. Hardisty Hill, which is just to the north of Blubberhouses, is believed to take its name from the Saxon/Danish family who lived there. The poll tax of 1379 shows that Johannes de Hardolfsty and Stephanus de Hardolfsty were resident there.

Settlements within the Washburn Valley
Name	Domesday listing	Population 1672 (Note: Estimated)	Population 1841	Population 1851	Population 1901	Population 2011	Details	Ref
Blubberhouses	No	N/A	99	83	64	30		
Bramley Head	No	N/A	N/A	N/A	N/A	N/A		
Farnley	Yes	225	217	198	156	340		
Fewston	Yes	See Timble	850	399	197	180	Listed as Timble-cum-Fewston in 1672	
Hardisty Hill	No	N/A	N/A	N/A	N/A	N/A		
Haverah Park	No	63	101	103	272	30		
Leathley	Yes	243	272	247	142	180		
Lindley	Yes	108	140	135	N/A	60		
Norwood cum Clifton	As Clifton	319	387	474	333	220	Listed as Clifton cum Norwood in 1901	
Spinksburn	No	N/A	N/A	N/A	N/A	N/A		
Stainburn	Yes	148	248	245	150	130		
Thruscross	No	N/A	700	339	181	90		
Timble	Yes	355	N/A	N/A	92	N/A		
Timble Parva	No	36	N/A	N/A	N/A	N/A		
West End	No	N/A	N/A	N/A	N/A	N/A	Name first recorded in 1733	
Wydrah	No	N/A	N/A	N/A	N/A	N/A		

Blubberhouses has been described as being the only village in the dale; but both Fewston and Leathley have churches, with Leathley being labelled as the "Capital of Washburndale". In some older documents, Blubberhouses is two words (Blubber Houses) and West End, just one word (Westend). Although largely submerged under Thruscross Reservoir, the name West End persists in a hamlet on the south-western side of the reservoir. Some places were lost under the reservoirs, such as Thackeray and West End, others (Beston and Elsworth) are described as being lost by Smith long before the reservoir builders arrived in the valley.

Although there are some pubs in the valley, there are no shops. Churches in the valley include St Andrews at Blubberhouses, built in 1856, All Saints at Farnley, rebuilt in 1851, St Michael and St Lawrence (1697) at Fewston, St Oswald (ancient) at Leathley, and St Mary at Stainburn (Norman). There was an ancient chapel-of-ease at West End (Thruscross) that was raised to church level in 1873, with a dedication to the Holy Trinity; the building was submerged under Thruscross Reservoir. The position of the chapel is thought to be the derivation of Capelshaw Beck, the other beck that flows into Thruscross Reservoir.

== Rainfall and environment ==
The River Washburn has been known to flood; one of the worst of these was on 4 August 1767 when the river rose over 1.8 metres (6 ft) in one hour, sweeping away cattle and two old bridges at Dob Park and Lindley.

Rainfall in the Washburn Valley 1900 – 1991
Year	Rainfall	Location	Gridref	Altitude	Notes	Ref
1900	928 millimetres (36.54 in)	Blubberhouses	SE171554	175 metres (575 ft)		
1916	980 millimetres (38.4 in)	Timble Ings	SE138531	278 metres (912 ft)	Measuring station was located on the western side of the valley near Timble	
1926	900 millimetres (35.4 in)	Lane Head	SE130587	290 metres (950 ft)	Measuring station was located on the western side of the valley near Thruscross	
1936	1,130 millimetres (44.6 in)	Lane Head	SE130587	290 metres (950 ft)		
1946	1,230 millimetres (48.4 in)	Lane Head	SE130587	290 metres (950 ft)		
1956	1,200 millimetres (46 in)	Lane Head	SE130587	290 metres (950 ft)		
1966	1,149 millimetres (45.2 in)	High House	SE136610	326 metres (1,070 ft)	Measuring station was located on the eastern side of the valley above the northern part of Thruscross Reservoir	
1976	1,185 millimetres (46.7 in)	Thruscross Reservoir	SE154574	235 metres (771 ft)	Measuring station is located on the south-west corner of the dam, at the dam head opposite public car park	
1986	1,351 millimetres (53.2 in)	Thruscross Reservoir	SE154574	235 metres (771 ft)		
1987	1,062 millimetres (41.8 in)	Thruscross Reservoir	SE154574	235 metres (771 ft)		
1988	1,295 millimetres (51 in)	Thruscross Reservoir	SE154574	235 metres (771 ft)		
1989					No data for the Washburn Valley	
1990	1,103 millimetres (43.4 in)	Thruscross Reservoir	SE154574	235 metres (771 ft)		
1991	989 millimetres (38.9 in)	Thruscross Reservoir	SE154574	235 metres (771 ft)		

Between 1991 and 2020, the average yearly rainfall at Lindley Wood Reservoir was 1,079 millimetres (42.5 in). Lindley Wood is 93 metres (305 ft) above sea level.

The west side of the valley constitutes part of the West Nidderdale, Barden and Blubberhouses Moors SSSI which is an important breeding ground for birds. Additionally, Timble Ings has been designated as a Site of Importance for Nature Conservation. The Washburn Valley is noted for its birdlife, specifically the nightjar and the red kite at the southern end of the valley, with curlew and lapwing prevalent on the grasslands in the dale.

== Notable people ==
- Robert Collyer, clergyman who lived at Blubberhouses in his youth
- Edward Fairfax, translator lived at Fewston
- Gareth Southgate, owns and lives in Swinsty Hall in the valley
