= Hawksley House =

Apartment building in Sunderland, England

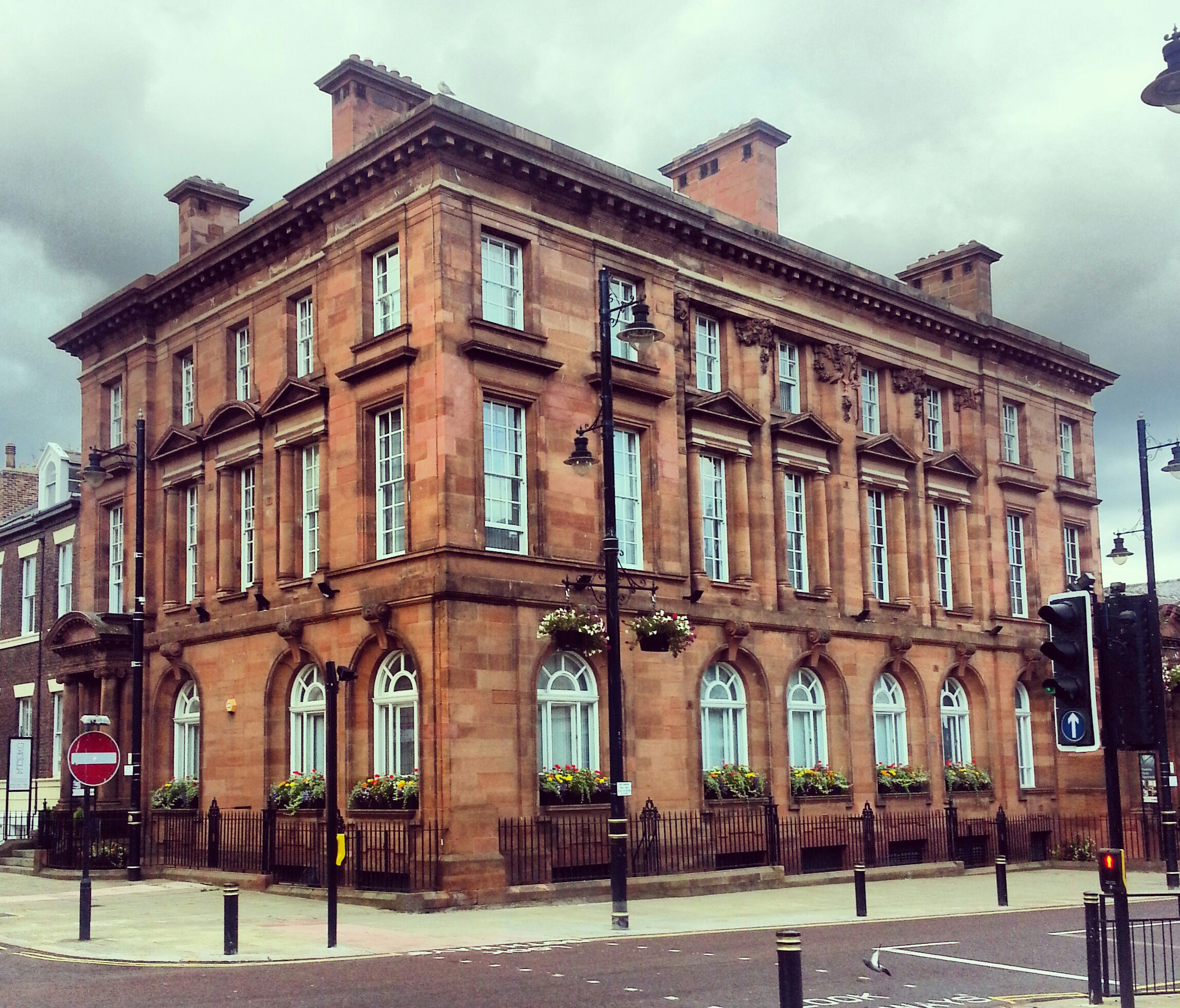
- Hawksley House

- Location within Tyne and Wear

General information
- Architectural style: Neoclassical and baroque
- Location: John Street, Sunderland, United Kingdom
- Coordinates: 54.90452°N 1.37986°W
- Completed: 1907

Technical details
- Floor count: 3

Design and construction
- Architects: William and Thomas Ridley Milburn

Hawksley House is an apartment building in Sunderland, Tyne and Wear, England. It is designated by English Heritage as a Grade II listed building.

== History ==
Designed by Sunderland-born brothers William and Thomas Ridley Milburn, the building was completed in 1907 as offices for the Sunderland and South Shields Water Company. It has recently been converted into apartments, at which time it gained its present name, after Thomas Hawksley and Charles Hawksley, father and son civil engineers who were associated with water related projects in Sunderland.

== Architecture ==
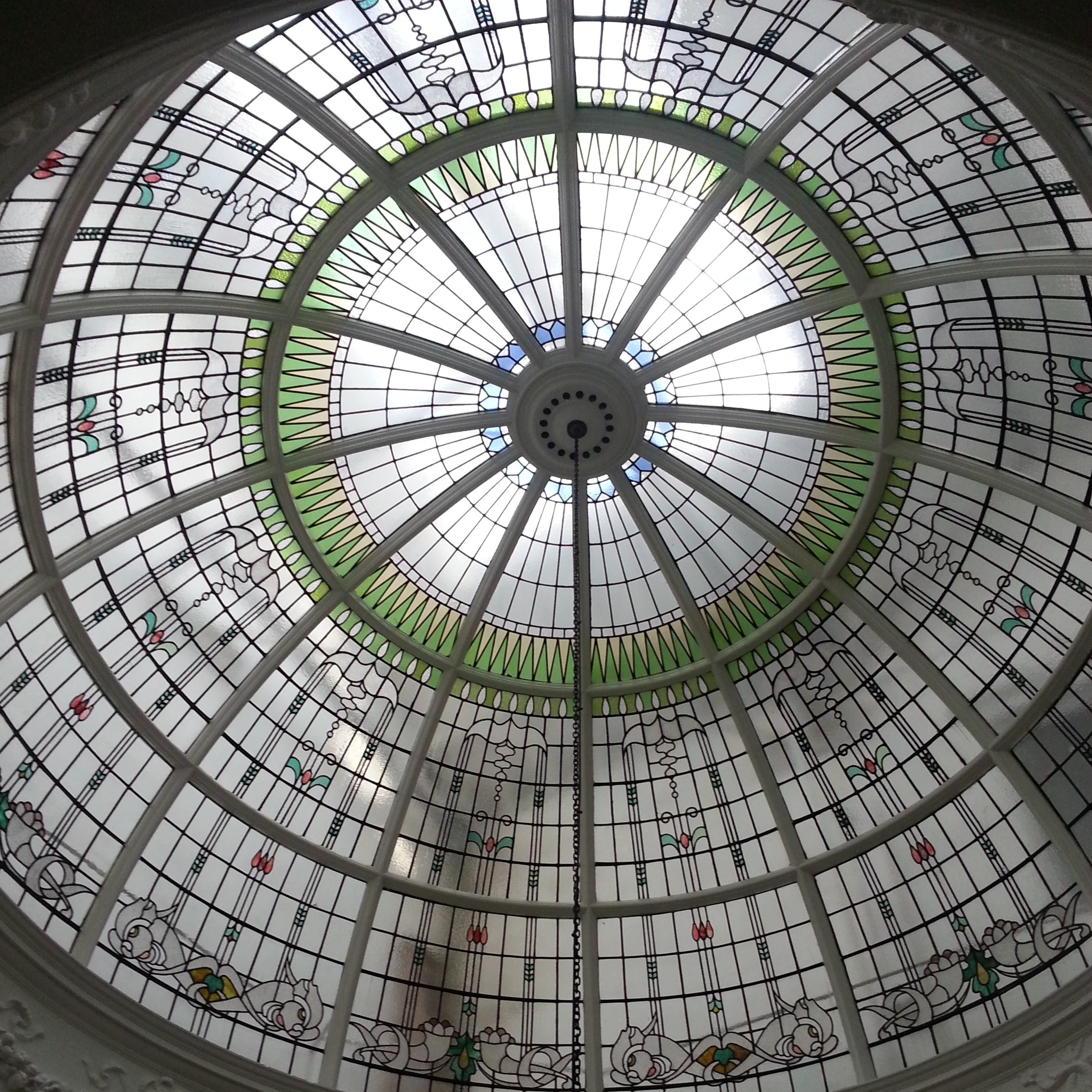
The glass dome above the main staircase in Hawksley House

The building was constructed in Penrith red sandstone and ashlar with a Lakeland slate roof. The exterior design is neoclassical and features Ionic porches, Tuscan window bays, architraves and dentilled cornices.

The interior features a baroque, open stairwell with a glazed dome and high relief swags. The neoclassical design is repeated in the former board room, which has stucco wall panels and Ionic columns and pilasters.
