= John Farrah =

British grocer, confectioner, biologist and meteorologist

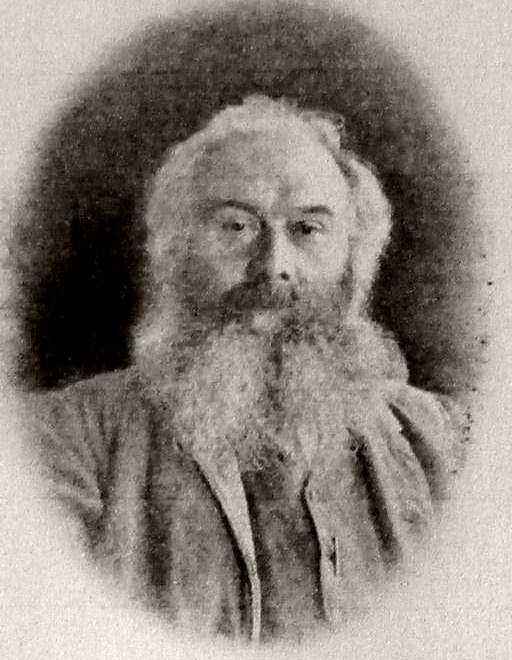
- Born: 28 May 1849; Harrogate], West Riding of Yorkshire, England
- Died: 13 November 1907 (aged 58); Knaresborough, England
- Occupations: Grocer; baker; confectioner; botanist; meteorologist
- Known for: – Development of Farrah's Harrogate toffee business – 1903 discovery of fungus sp. Entoloma farrahi (description in question as of 1948)

John Farrah, F.L.S., F.R.Met.S (28 May 1849 – 13 November 1907) was a British grocer, confectioner, biologist and meteorologist from Harrogate, West Riding of Yorkshire, England. In the late 19th century he developed the business strategy for Farrah's toffee shop which he inherited from his family in Harrogate. He was made a fellow of the Meteorological Society in 1894. He was president of the botanical section of the Yorkshire Naturalists' Union, working with Thomas Sheppard, George Edward Massee, William Eagle Clarke and Charles Crossland, and in 1903 discovered the mycological species Entoloma farrahi, which was named after him, although there has been some question as to its identity since then. He was a close friend of Harrogate historian William Grainge and for some years they were "constant companions", supporting each other in their work. The American mycologist George Francis Atkinson described him as a "great Yorkshire character". Farrah married three times, and had three children.

== Life ==
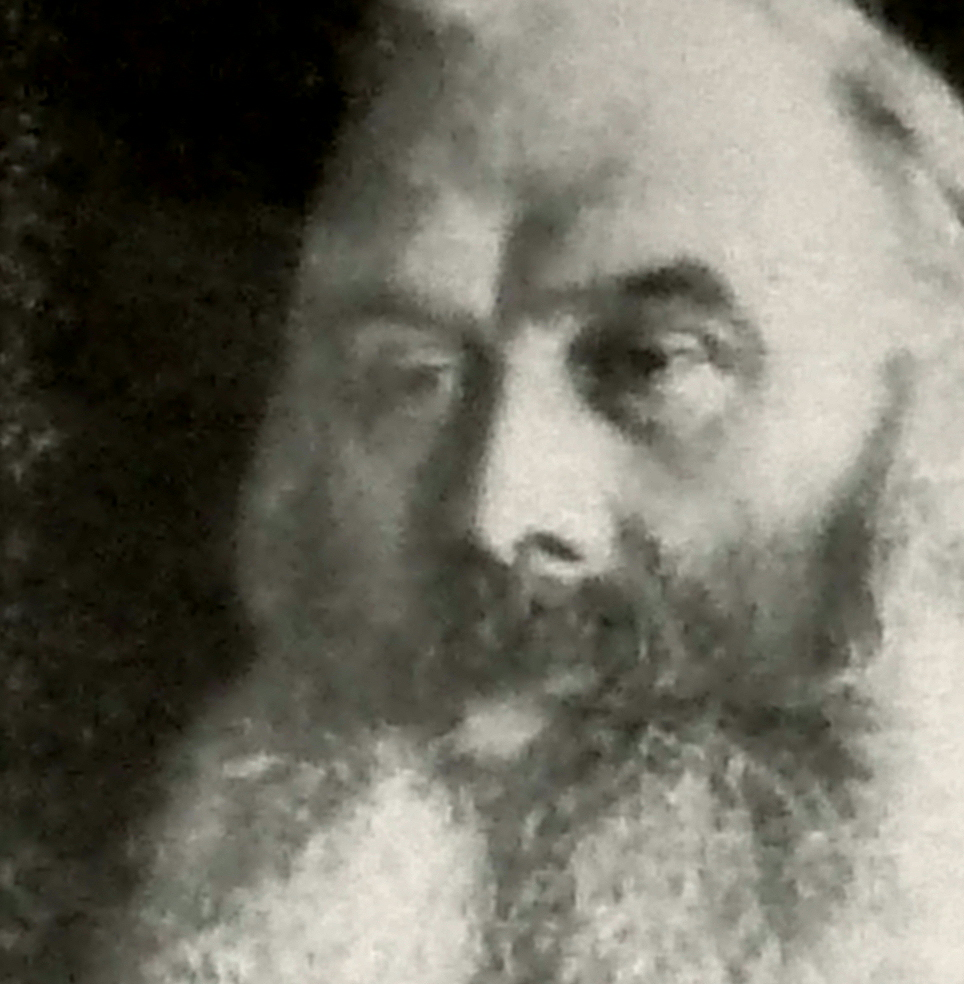
John Farrah, c.1900

John Farrah's paternal grandmother was Ann Farrah (d. 1843), (Note: Deaths Sep 1843 Farrah Ann Knaresbro' 23 167) a relative and assistant of tea-dealer Robert Hudson Swan (c.1810 – 11 May 1859), (Note: Deaths Jun 1859 Swan Robert Hudson Knaresbro' 9a 80) who started the family's grocery business. John Farrah's father was Joseph Farrah (Harrogate c.1807 – Harrogate 13 January 1857), a labourer and lodging house keeper until 1848 when he joined Swan's grocery shop and registered as a grocery dealer. (Note: England census 1871 RG10/4289 p.32 Pannal) John Farrah's mother was Esther (Pannal 1809 – Harrogate 11 April 1891). (Note: England census 1881 RG11/4326 p.10 Harrogate) Joseph and Esther had at least four children: Ellen (b. Harrogate 1837), Maria (b. Harrogate 1841), (Note: England census 1851 HO/107/2282 p.26 schedule 234 Low Harrogate. See also: Births Jun 1841 Farrah Maria Knaresbro' XXIII 276) Emma (b. Harrogate 1843), (Note: England census 1861 RG9/3206 p.10 Pannal. See also: Births Jun 1843 Farrah Emma Knaresboro XXIII 295) and John (Knaresborough 28 May 1849 – Knaresborough 13 November 1907). (Note: Births Jun 1849 Farrah John Knaresboro XXIII 436. / Deaths Dec 1907 Farrah John 58 Knaresbro' 9a 70) They lived in Chapel Street and Cold Bath Road, Harrogate, and in the 1850s they moved to 2 Crescent Place (since demolished) near the Pump Room in Low Harrogate. In 1857 Joseph died when John Farrah was 7 years old, so it was some years before John Farrah was running the shop, which was registered at 2 Crescent Place in 1873 when John was 24 years old. (Note: England census 1841 HO/107/1285/11 p.2 schedule 5, Bilton with Harrogate)

Farrah remained at Crescent Place, with three nephews who worked for the grocery firm. (Note: England census 1891 RG12/3519 p.1 schedule 60 Harrogate) He had three wives in total. He married Georgiana Livingstone Forbes (c.1850 – Knaresborough 1880) in 1879. (Note: Marriages Mar 1879 Farrah John Knaresborough 9a 109 to – Georgiana Livingstone Forbes / Deaths Jun 1880 Farrah Georgina Livingstone 30 Knaresbro' 9a 88) He then married Emma Coulson (1853 – Knaresborough 5 December 1888) on 5 April 1883. (Note: Marriages Jun 1883 Farrah John and Coulson Emma Ecclesall Beirlow 9c 326 / Deaths Dec 1888 Farrah Emma 35 Knaresbro' 9a 77) In 1889 he married Hannah Pitchfold (Sheffield c.1852 – 21 April 1896), (Note: Marriages Mar 1889 Farrah John and Pitchfold Hannah Knaresbro' 9a 137) and they had three children: John William (Harrogate 1884 – Knaresborough 7 September 1907), (Note: Births Mar 1884 Farrah John William Knaresbro' 9a 107 / Deaths Sep 1907 Farrah John William 23 Knaresbro' 9a 80) Constance Annie (Harrogate 1887 – 15 September 1915), (Note: Births Mar 1887 Farrah Annie Constance Knaresbro' 9a 110 / Deaths Sep 1915 Farrah Constance A. 28 Knaresbro 9a 136 (She is variously listed as Annie Constance or Constance Annie)) and Joseph Sumpster (Harrogate 1889 – Lewes 1958) of the Royal Engineers. (Note: Births Jun 1889 Farrah Joseph Sumpster Knaresbro' 9a 118 / Deaths Sep 1958 Farrah Joseph S. 69 Lewes 5h 390)

Farrah appeared in Court twice in 1880, the year when his first wife died. On the first occasion he was accused of trespassing on nurseryman E.J. Batchelor's land on Harlow Hill, Harrogate. The case was dismissed when it was established that Farrah was on a public footpath. On the second occasion he was suing labourer R.E. Sharpe for non-payment of groceries. A compromise verdict was given.

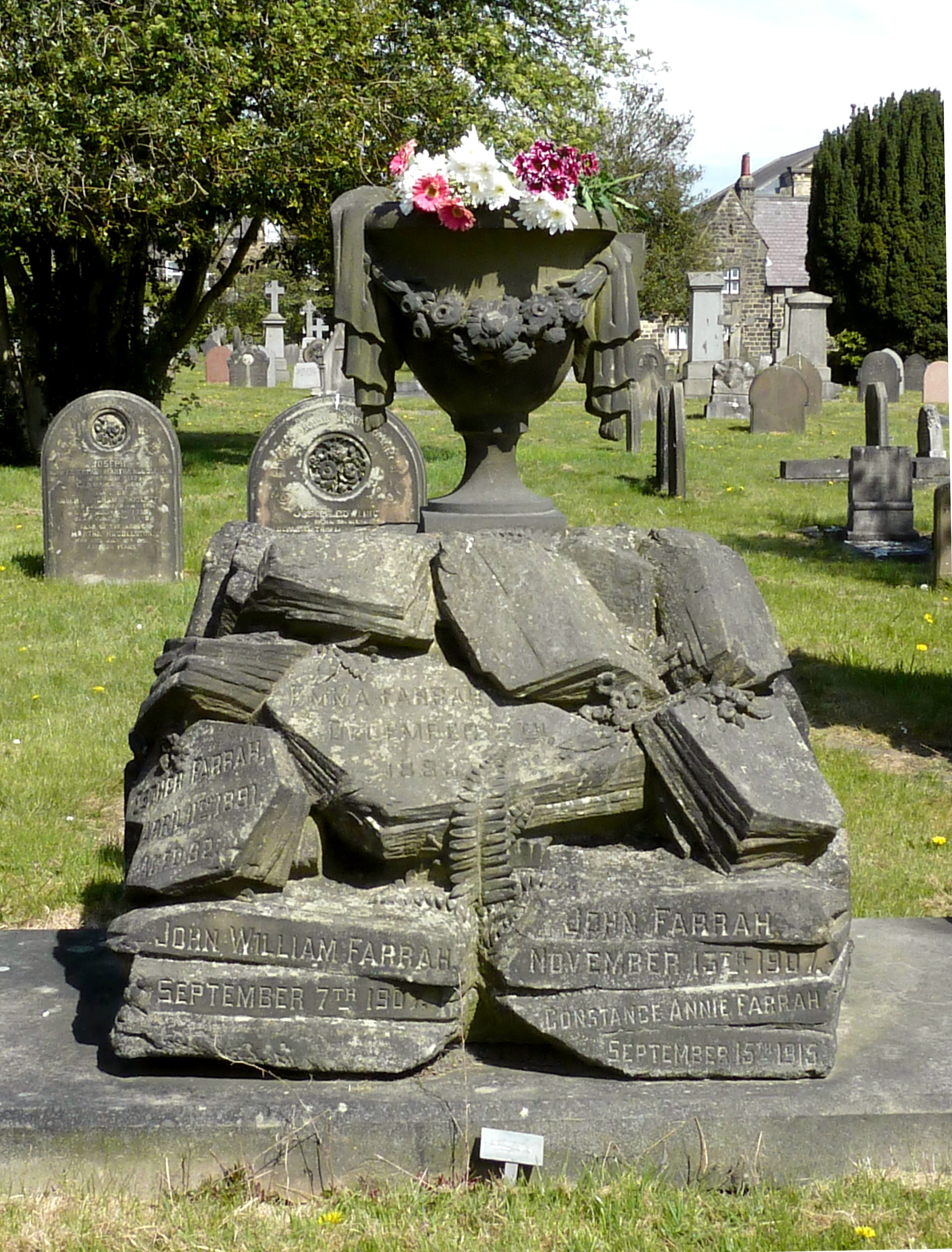
Farrah's gravestone

Farrah lived at a house named Jefferies Coate on the York Road, Harrogate, from at least 1894. He retired on 26 March 1900, so in 1901 the census finds Farrah as a retired baker, grocer and widower at Jefferies Coate in York Road, Harrogate, with his children. (Note: England Census 1901 RG13/4053 p.18 Harrogate) After he retired, his health was poor. In the two years before he died, he bought two farms at Felliscliffe, but they required his time and money, and took him away from his botanical work. Farrah is buried at Grove Road Cemetery, Harrogate. He left £26,254 (equivalent to £2,730,648.56 in 2025) in his will. Nine years after Farrah died, his son Joseph presented eight marble busts by William John Seward Webber, besides Thomas Holroyd's portrait of Farrah's friend William Grainge and some "rare manuscripts" to Harrogate Library.

=== Character ===
American botanist George Francis Atkinson (1854–1918) describes Farrah in his 1903 diary of his visit to England.

I never saw Mr. Farrah with his coat on. He is about six feet, two inches. Legs not very large yet stout enough for his body which is "sub" corpulent, breast broad, head large, forehead massive, but a little sloping, head surmounted, flanked and brought up in the rear by a heavy growth of long dark gray hair, eyes large, mild and appealing yet with humor hidden under the large lashes, chin and cheek with a patriarch beard for size, but of the same color as his hair, and a neck well constructed, the nose not massive nor puny but yet present ... Mr. Farrah always carved, now the hams, then the beef, one day at the end of the table, the next day at the other end. He always stood. When talking he would close the operation of carving, flourish his hands and arms, carving knife and fork, stand erect, his subcorpulent body not quite in contact with the fat so-called English ham, which he declared was imported from America (Canada) ... Many were the jokes he would get off on Massee and Clarke, and they often would get back at him. When they brought in some unexpected thrust at him he would appear stunned, would simply stare and make no reply. (G.F. Atkinson (1903), Diary of Trip to Europe) (Note: In the same document of 1903, Sheppard says he was told that Farrah went silent on those occasions when he would normally swear but circumstances prevented him. He also says that Farrah liked "racy" stories.)

John Farrah, who would not be called "Mr" or Esquire", was both modest and forthright. Thomas Sheppard, in The Naturalist of December 1907, gives an account of Farrah's personality:

He was honest and straightforward to a degree that is rarely seen now-a-days. He hated deceits and shams of every description, and rarely was he so bluff and out-spoken as when roused by some mean action, or what he considered a high-handed or improper procedure. Proud of his county and of the characteristics of Yorkshiremen, he strongly upheld these, no matter in whose company. Anything approaching to cant met with his disapproval and caused him to express his feelings very forcibly. (T. Sheppard (1907), In Memoriam)

Farrah may have been a businessman, but in certain respects he preferred the rural idyll to industrial progress: "The motor car [is] the latest curse inflicted upon the country ... I used to have a contempt for cyclists; now I am beginning to respect them. They glide along noiseless and stinkless, and comparatively dustless, and the tinkle of their bells is heavenly music compared with the horn of the motor". However, Atkinson is right about Farrah's sense of humour. Here is a footnote from his paper, "Flowering plants of Bowes": "It is called Honesty from its transparency. We can see through it. From this I conclude that it did not originate in Yorkshire".

== John Farrah Ltd ==
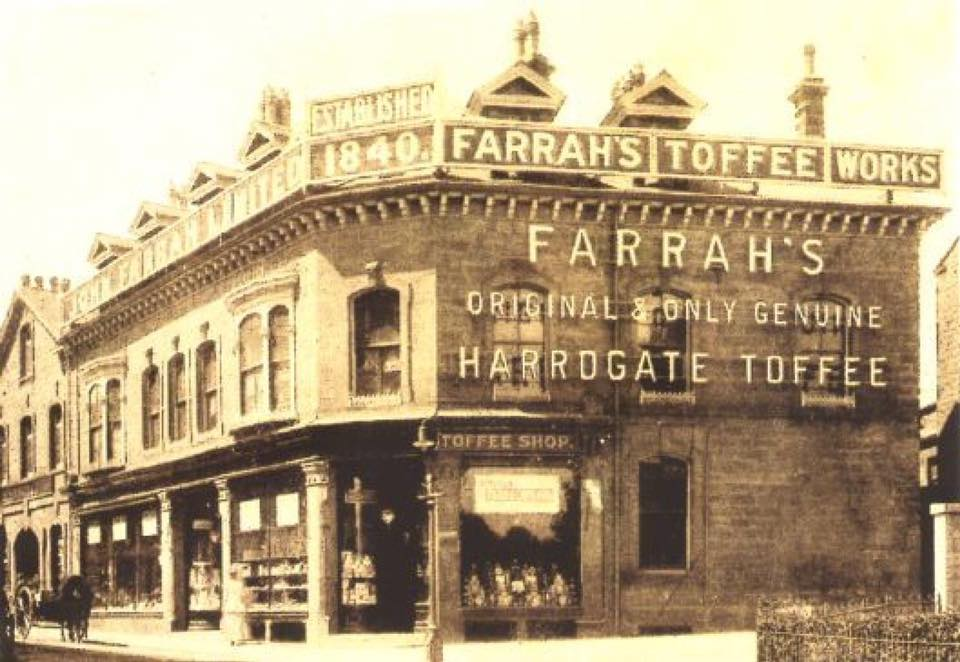
Farrah's toffee shop,1875, designed for Farrah by Arthur Hiscoe.

John Farrah was a baker and a grocer. In the late 19th century he was owner and director of Messrs John Farrah (Limited), grocers and confectioners of Crescent Road and Royal Parade, Harrogate. In 1903 the American mycologist George Francis Atkinson said that Farrah earned "four or five thousand dollars yearly" (equivalent to $179,166.67 in 2025).

One Joseph Farrah of Harrogate was selling "genuine spaw water" and exporting it as far as Hull in 1822. Robert Hudson Swan started a tea business in Crown Place, Harrogate. In 1840 Swan invented a toffee recipe designed to take away the taste of the Harrogate spa waters which tourists would take at the nearby Royal Pump Room. The taste of this toffee is like barley sugar and butterscotch, and it contains various types of sugar, butter and lemon flavouring. Farrah's paternal grandmother Ann Farrah was a relative of Swan and an assistant in the business, and his father Joseph was registered as a dealer for the company in 1848. The company was officially registered at 2 Crescent Place, Harrogate in 1873. By 1887 John Farrah was owner of the company, and in that year he registered Swan's recipe as Farrah's Harrogate Toffee, while trademarking his own name as the business name. However the company was not listed with directorships until 16 February 1897, when John Farrah Limited was registered; the directors were Fred Farrah Ridsdale, Fred Hunter and John Farrah. John Farrah resigned on 26 March 1900 at the age of 50.

Since Farrah's lifetime, the company has expanded products and premises, and was visited by Queen Elizabeth II in 1998. Today it is known as Farrah's.

== Natural science ==
John Farrah, F.L.S., F.R.Met.S, was an amateur botanist, a "great Yorkshire character", and chairman of Yorkshire Naturalists' Union (YNU) in 1906, while also assisting with funds and paying extra for thorough work. He was Honorary Meteorological Recorder for Harrogate at one point, and was elected as a fellow of the Royal Meteorological Society on 18 April 1894. He was a "well-known Yorkshire naturalist", and secretary and president of the Old Harrogate Naturalists' Club for "many years", He contributed to Harry Speight's Nidderdale (1894), "He had one of the best scientific libraries in the district." In the YNU he was on the executive committee for some years, he took "a leading part" as president of the Botanical Section, and assisted the Committee of Suggestions for Research. As a birder he would be in the field by three o'clock in the morning before work.

His collecting was restricted to books ... He was ... very severe with those who collected rare plants or anything which might in any way have a harmful effect upon the flora or fauna of the county. More than one over-enthusiastic character has received such a "dressing down" from John Farrah that they will remember it to the end of their days. (T. Sheppard (1907), In Memoriam)

Farrah did not like writing papers, but he did write "The flowering plants of Bowes", eschewing certain academic styles:

It is not my intention to write a string of dry scientific names in the body of this article; if these appear at all it will be at the end, in a list to themselves, where they will stand in stern forbiddingness, the bug-bear of many a would-be botanist. Bowes is delightfully quiet and peaceful, and I pray God that it will forever remain so. (John Farrah, The flowering plants of Bowes)

=== Published papers ===
- Farrah, John (1903). "The flowering plants of Bowes". The Naturalist. London: 359–369. "2 plates. (5000 8000 de) 13249" (As listed in: International catalogue of scientific literature [Sect.] M. Botany : 1st −14th annual issues, 1901–1914)

=== Entoloma farrahi ===
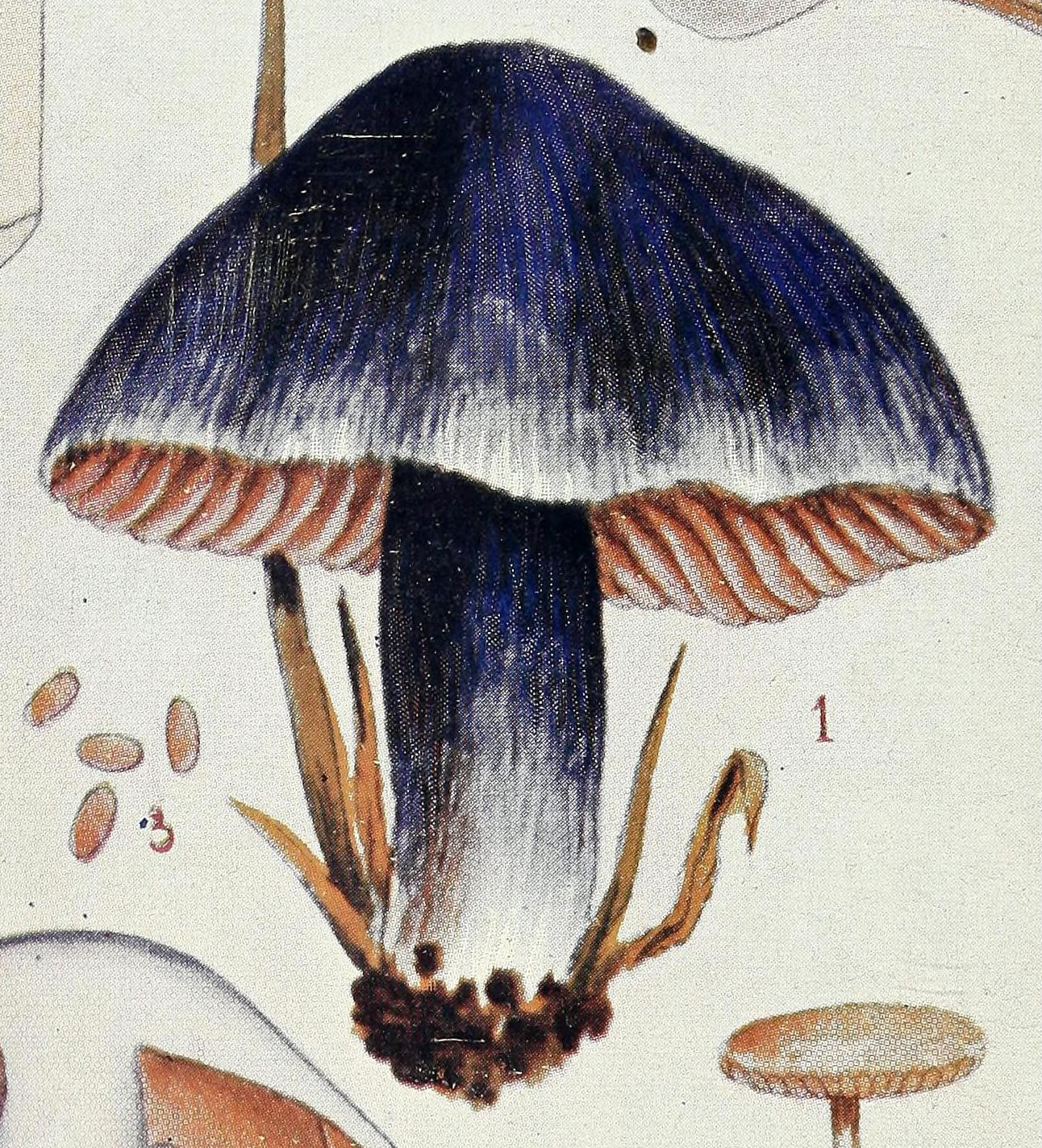
The 1904 drawing of Entoloma farrahi

In 1903 among unimproved grass on Rievaulx Terrace overlooking Rievaulx Abbey, while assisting at the Fungus Foray of the Mycological Committee, Farrah discovered a "large indigo-blue" toadstool, which was named Entoloma farrahi after him in 1904. The Yorkshire Naturalists' Union returned to the area in 1919, but the weather had been dry, and they did not find E. farrahi.

In 1948, the 1904 description of Entoloma farrahi by George Edward Massee and Charles Crossland was re-examined, and was judged to be dubious, on account of not being an Entoloma due to the given smooth shape of the spores. The spore size (to 10.8 μm in length), if assumed to be correct even if the shape is wrong, would only fit E. bloxamii. However, the fruit body which Farrah found in 1903 would closely resemble the endangered Entoloma species: big blue pinkgill, specifically E. atromadidum whose indigo colour (shading to black) is identical, if the 1904 drawing of the smooth spores were taken as an error. (Note: George Francis Atkinson reports in his 1903 diary that George Edward Massee (1845–1917) told him that if he and William Eagle Clarke did not have sufficient live specimens to complete a botanical illustration, then they would invent the missing piece. That may explain the inappropriately smooth spores in the illustration of E. farrahi. In that case it would not be so much an error as an invention of an element (the spores) which they had not seen. However, Massee also said that such improper illustrations remained unsigned – whereas as we can see, the illustration of E. farrahi is signed by Massee.)

=== Friendship with William Grainge ===
According to Thomas Sheppard, M.Sc. (1876–1945), Farrah was a "good antiquary, and had a thorough knowledge of the past and present history of the Harrogate district. For several years he was the constant companion of the late William Grainge, whose History of the Forest of Knaresborough is well known. In connection with this work Mr. Farrah helped a good deal."

According to John Farrah, he knew Grainge, "better than anyone else, even better than the members of [Grainge's] family in a scientific sense". They first met when Farrah was a boy, purchasing books from his bookshop. The regular April–September Sunday walks taken by Grainge and Farrah began in 1873, when Farrah was about twenty-four years old, and Grainge was fifty-five. An average walk would be a 24-mile-long (39 km) round trip, and it was Grainge who introduced Farrah to many aspects of natural science. After Grainge died, Farrah wrote a Tribute to him, describing their friendship.

Farrah possessed a portrait painting of Grainge, which as of 2021 hangs in Harrogate library. The painting was presented to Harrogate Field Naturalists' and Camera club in the late 1890s by John Farrah. It moved to Harrogate library in 1916 when it was presented by Farrah's son Joseph.
