= Timble =

Village in North Yorkshire, England

Coordinates: 53.97234°N 1.72715°W

- Location within North Yorkshire
- Population: 142 (2011)
- OS grid reference: SE179529
- Civil parish: Great Timble
- Unitary authority: North Yorkshire
- Ceremonial county: North Yorkshire
- Region: Yorkshire and the Humber
- Country: England
- Sovereign state: United Kingdom
- Post town: OTLEY
- Postcode district: LS21
- Police: North Yorkshire
- Fire: North Yorkshire
- Ambulance: Yorkshire

Timble is a village in the county of North Yorkshire, England. It is situated on the slopes of the Washburn Valley, north of Otley and close to Swinsty and Fewston reservoirs.

== History ==
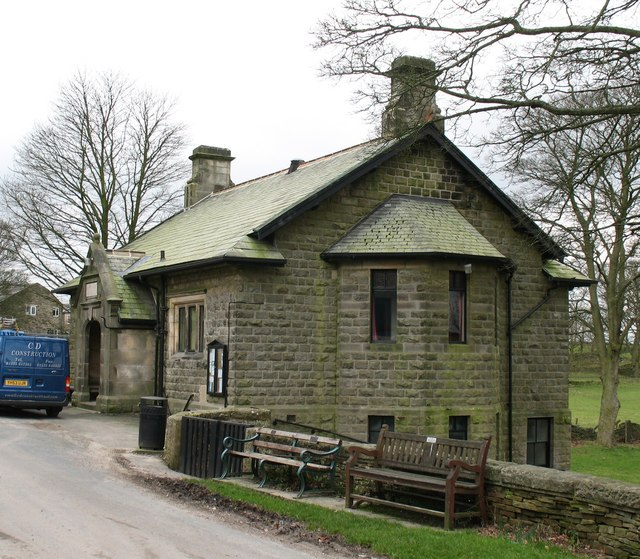
Timble Robinson Library

The village is recorded as having been raided by Scottish marauders in 1318. In 1988, the diaries of local man John Dickinson were published, providing considerable insight into the history of the village and the surrounding area. In the 17th century, the village was home to The Witches of Timble, who were accused of witchcraft by local poet Edward Fairfax, and tried but acquitted twice at York.

The village has one pub, the Timble Inn. It was closed in 2004 but was re-opened in September 2009 as a Free House following an extensive refurbishment.

The Yorkshire Water Way goes through Timble.

== Etymology ==
The name Timble may be of Brittonic origin and derived from the elements din, "a hill fort", and mę:l, "bald, bare". It may otherwise have a connection with Old English tumbian, "to tumble", although verbs rarely form the basis of settlement names.

== Parishes ==
The village of Timble is the principal settlement in the civil parish of Great Timble. East of the village is the separate civil parish of Little Timble, which includes Swinsty Hall, a Grade I listed building (presently the home of Gareth Southgate), and the western side of Swinsty Reservoir. Little Timble has only a small population, estimated at 10.

The two parishes have different histories. Great Timble was a township in the ancient parish of Fewston. Little Timble was a township in the large ancient parish of Otley. Both became separate civil parishes in 1866. Until 1974 it was part of the West Riding of Yorkshire. From 1974 to 2023 it was part of the Borough of Harrogate, it is now administered by the unitary North Yorkshire Council.

== See also ==
- Listed buildings in Great Timble
- Listed buildings in Little Timble
