= Six Dales Trail =

Long distance footpath in North Yorkshire, England

Six Dales Way
- Length: 39 mi (63 km)
- Location: North and West Yorkshire, England
- Trailheads: Jubilee Tower, Otley, West Yorkshire; 53.9054°N 1.6942°W; Market Cross, Middleham, North Yorkshire; 54.2853°N 1.8057°W
- Use: Hiking
- Elevation gain/loss: total ascent 1,453 m (4,767 ft)
- Sights: Middleham Castle

The Six Dales Trail is a long distance footpath in North Yorkshire, England, with a short section in West Yorkshire. It is 38 miles (61 km) long and connects Otley and Middleham.

The trail is waymarked. It was opened by Janet Street-Porter at the end of June 2010 in conjunction with Otley Walking Festival. It is a project of Walkers are Welcome - Otley.

== Route ==
The route takes its name from the six Yorkshire Dales it traverses: Wharfedale, Washburndale, Nidderdale, Colsterdale, Coverdale and Wensleydale.

From Otley in Wharfedale the trail heads north to Swinsty Reservoir, then follows Washburndale past Fewston Reservoir to the small village of Blubberhouses. From the dam of Thruscross Reservoir above Blubberhouses the trail climbs and descends to the village of Glasshouses in Nidderdale. It says close to the River Nidd to Pateley Bridge. Above Pateley the trail coincides with the Nidderdale Way past Wath and Gouthwaite Reservoir to Bouthwaite near Ramsgill. The trail then ascends to cross Fountains Earth Moor and Low Ash Head Moor to the head of Roundhill Reservoir. It descends to cross Colsterdale at Gollinglith Foot to reach Ellingstring and Jervaulx Abbey in Wensleydale. It then ascends the side valley of Coverdale for 1.9 miles (3 km) before turning north to reach the end of the trail at Middleham.
