= Listed buildings in Little Timble =

Little Timble is a civil parish in the county of North Yorkshire, England. It contains three listed buildings that are recorded in the National Heritage List for England. Of these, one is listed at Grade I, the highest of the three grades, and the others are at Grade II, the lowest grade. The parish is entirely rural, and does not contain any settlements. The most important building in the parish is Swinsty Hall, a large listed house, and the other listed buildings are a smaller house and a farmhouse.

== Key ==
Grade	Criteria
I	Buildings of exceptional interest, sometimes considered to be internationally important
II	Buildings of national importance and special interest

== Buildings ==
Name and location	Photograph	Date	Notes	Grade
Swinsty Hall; 53.97451°N 1.70621°W		Late 16th to early 17th century	A large house on a plinth, with quoins, and a stone slate roof, some of the gables with elaborate shaped kneelers and corniced pyramidal finials. The house is of three builds, the main range with three storeys and four bays, recessed to the west is a range with two storeys and two bays, and to the rear at right angles is a two-storey, three-bay range. On the main range is a three-storey porch that has a moulded surround with roses in the soffits. Inside the porch are benches, and the inner doorway has a moulded chamfered surround and a triangular head. The windows in the house are mullioned and transomed, with ogee-moulded heads and hood moulds.	I
Nether Timble; 53.96789°N 1.71303°W	—	Early 17th century	The house is in gritstone, and has a stone slate roof with shaped kneelers and gable copings. There are two storeys and three bays, a two-storey porch on the left, and a rear lean-to. The house has a central inserted doorway, and a blocked doorway with a large lintel to the right. The windows are mullioned with hood moulds. The porch contains a canted bay window, with a string course and a mullioned window above.	II
Bride Cross Farmhouse and barn 53.96780°N 1.71026°W	—	Early to mid 18th century	The farmhouse and barn are in gritstone, with quoins, two storeys, and stone slate roofs with shaped kneelers and gable copings. The farmhouse has two bays, and a lean-to on the left. The doorway has a surround with inscribed initials and a leaf motif, and the windows are mullioned. The barn has four bays, and contains a cart entrance with quoined jambs and a wooden lintel, a stable window, two loading doors and slit vents.	II
