= Yorkshire Heritage Way =

42-mile footpath in northern England

Coordinates: 53.929°N 1.792°W

The Yorkshire Heritage Way is a 42-mile (68 km) footpath in northern England. It links the contrasting cities of Bradford in West Yorkshire and Ripon in North Yorkshire, and passes through two UNESCO World Heritage Sites: Saltaire, and Fountains Abbey and Studley Royal Park.

The way was created in part to connect the Area of Outstanding Natural Beauty of Nidderdale with the urban area of Bradford, in line with the recommendations of the Glover Review that AONBs should be made more accessible to city-dwellers. It was designed by members of The Ramblers Lower Wharfedale group and the Burley Bridge Association.

The trail was officially launched on 29 April 2022. An inaugural 4-day walk along the trail was arranged to arrive at Ripon Cathedral as it celebrated the 1,350th anniversary of its foundation.

== Route ==
The way starts at Bradford Cathedral in the centre of Bradford in West Yorkshire, and passes through Saltaire, Shipley Glen and Burley Woodhead to arrive at Burley in Wharfedale. Here the River Wharfe must be crossed, either by stepping stones or by a two-mile detour to use Denton Bridge upstream: the Burley Bridge Association is actively campaigning for a footbridge across the river at Burley, which has been requested by local residents since 1898. The route continues, now in North Yorkshire, past Timble, Blubberhouses church and the Washburn Valley, to Thruscross Reservoir. It goes on past Glasshouses to the National Trust's spectacular Brimham Rocks before passing Fountains Abbey and Studley Royal Park and reaching Ripon Cathedral.

The route will form the basis of a 50-mile (80 km) ultramarathon in 2023.
