= River Washburn =

River in North Yorkshire, England

- The River Washburn approaching Lindley Wood Reservoir

Location
- Country: England

Physical characteristics
- Source
  - location: Washburn Head
  - coordinates: 54°3′46″N 1°50′50″W
  - elevation: 391 m (1,283 ft)
- Mouth
  - location: River Wharfe near Pool
  - coordinates: 53°54′39″N 1°39′6″W
  - elevation: 49 m (161 ft)
- Length: 26 km (16 mi)
- Basin size: 87.3 km^{2} (33.7 sq mi)

The River Washburn is a river in Yorkshire, England. It originates high in the Yorkshire Dales and ends where it meets the River Wharfe. It lies within the Nidderdale National Landscape.

== Name ==
The earliest recorded form of the river's name was Walkesburn, from the early 12th century. The name is thought to come from an Old English personal name Walc, not otherwise recorded, so means "stream of a man named Walc".

== Course ==
The river's source is at Washburn Head on Pock Stones Moor, just south of Stump Cross Caverns. From there it flows southwards via Thruscross Reservoir, Blubberhouses, Fewston Reservoir, Swinsty Reservoir and Lindley Wood Reservoir, before joining the River Wharfe just north-west of Pool-in-Wharfedale near Leathley. From source to the mouth on the River Wharfe is 16.2 miles (26.1 km).

== Reservoirs ==
The Washburn has been dammed to a series of four reservoirs. Three were built to supply water to the city of Leeds. The lower three (Lindley Wood, Swinsty and Fewston) were built at the end of the 19th century, while the fourth, Thruscross, was delayed until the 1960s. Fewston and Swinsty reservoirs have a surface area of around 1.6 square kilometres (0.62 mi^{2}) and a combined length of 4.1 kilometres (2.5 mi); Thackray Beck and Spinksburn Beck are major tributaries flowing into these reservoirs. Capelshaw Beck is the main tributary flowing into Thruscross reservoir. Lindley reservoir maintains river flow, not public supply.

== Geology ==
Where the valley has not been flooded to make reservoirs, the sides are V-shaped. The valley floor consists of solid Millstone Grit overlain with till drift. The drainage can be described as slowly permeable and seasonally waterlogged. The bedrock is covered with fine loam over clay soils and some peat soils at higher elevations on the fringe of the moorland.

== Geography ==
The river valley has grassland that is intensively managed for livestock. There are also a range of field sizes, bounded by stonewalls that are often reinforced with post and wire fencing, plus some post and rail fencing. There are very large conifer forestry plantations around the reservoirs as well as at Beecroft Moor Plantation, with conifer shelterbelts at Carlhow Ridge Plantation. Deciduous tree clumps can be found around settlements. Ancient semi-natural woodland can still be seen at Blubberhouses, Folly Hall Wood, Hanging Wood and Ellers Wood. There is evidence of past quarrying of local stone for buildings and walls.

The river valley is crossed by the Harrogate Dales Way Link, the Six Dales Trail and the Yorkshire Heritage Way.

== Kayaking ==
The section of the river between Thruscross Reservoir and Fewston Reservoir is used for whitewater kayaking when water is released by Yorkshire Water.

== Heritage Centre ==
The Washburn Heritage Centre, adjacent to Fewston Church, opened in February 2011.

== See also ==
- Dob Park Bridge
- List of rivers of the United Kingdom
