= Thomas Hawksley =

English civil engineer (1807–1893)

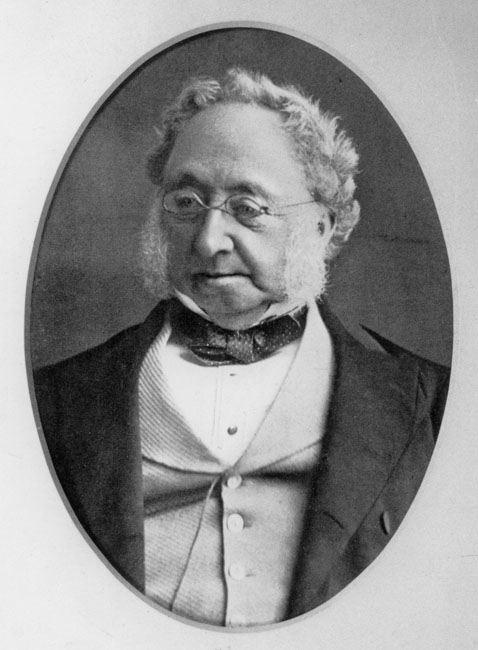
- Thomas Hawksley
- Born: 12 July 1807; Arnold, Nottinghamshire
- Died: 23 September 1893 (aged 86); Kensington, London
- Education: Self-taught from age 15
- Children: Charles Hawksley
- Parent(s): John Hawksley and Sarah Thompson
- Engineering career
- Discipline: Civil engineering
- Institutions: Institution of Civil Engineers (president), Institution of Gas Engineers and Managers (president), Fellow of the Royal Society
- Projects: Lindley Wood, Swinsty and Fewston reservoirs

Thomas Hawksley (12 July 1807 – 23 September 1893) was an English civil engineer of the 19th century, particularly associated with early water supply and coal gas engineering projects. Hawksley was, with John Frederick Bateman, the leading British water engineer of the nineteenth century and was personally responsible for upwards of 150 water-supply schemes, in the British Isles and overseas.

== Biography ==
The son of John Hawksley and Sarah Thompson and born in Arnot Hill House, Arnold, near Nottingham on 12 July 1807, Hawksley was largely self-taught from the age of 15 onwards—despite his education at Nottingham High School—having at that point become articled to a local firm of architects under the supervision of Edward Staveley that also undertook a variety of water-related engineering projects.

Locally, he remains particularly associated with schemes in his home county. He was engineer to the Nottingham Gas Light and Coke Company and Nottingham Waterworks Company for more than half a century, having, early in his career, completed the Trent Bridge waterworks (1831). This scheme delivered Britain's first high pressure 'constant supply', preventing contamination entering the supply of clean water mains.

Hawksley first rose to national prominence at the time of the health of towns inquiry in 1844. His advocacy of a constant supply of water to consumers brought him immediate acclaim. Edwin Chadwick adopted Hawksley as an ally for a time, but Hawksley adopted a more pragmatic approach and was prepared to act for others' undertakings. This approach led him to be appointed to many major water supply projects across England, including schemes for Liverpool, Sheffield, Leicester, Lincoln, Leeds, Derby, Darlington, Oxford, Cambridge, Sunderland, Wakefield and Northampton. He also undertook drainage projects, including schemes for Birmingham, Worcester and Windsor.

In 1852, Hawksley set up his own engineering practice in Westminster, London. He was the first president of the Institution of Gas Engineers and Managers (serving for three years from 1863), a Fellow of the Royal Society, and was elected President of the Institution of Civil Engineers in 1871 (a post his son Charles later occupied in 1901).

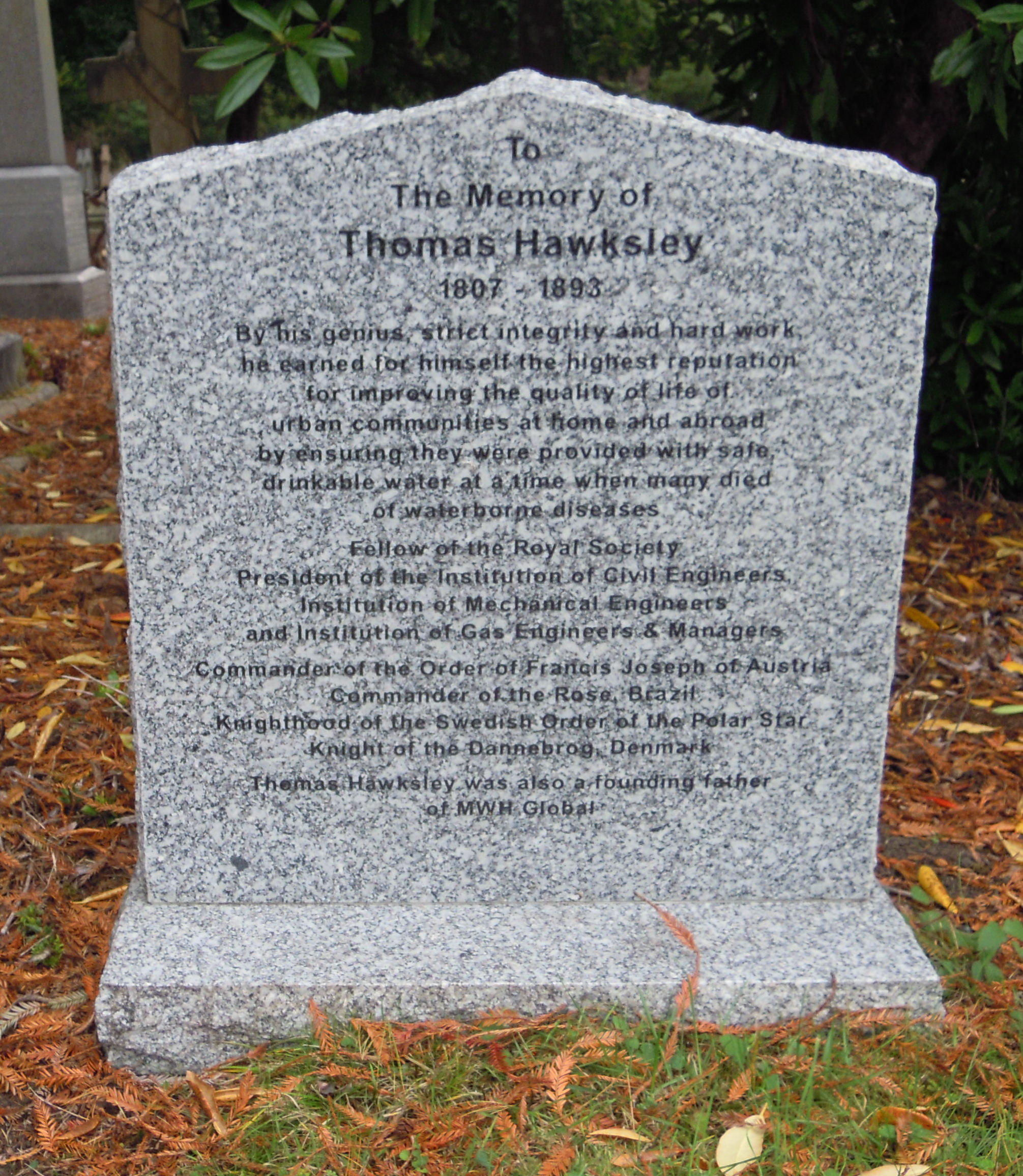
Hawksley's grave in Brookwood Cemetery

Between 1869 and 1879, Hawksley acted as consultant to the construction of Lindley Wood, Swinsty and Fewston reservoirs for Leeds Corporation Waterworks. At Tunstall Reservoir in 1876, and at Cowm Reservoir in 1877–78, he is credited with the first two uses of pressure grouting to control water leakage under an embankment dam. Glossop comments, "This procedure of rock grouting, which is now standard practice in dam construction, was an invention of the greatest importance to engineering practice, but its adoption by civil engineers was slow."

Hawksley died in Kensington, London in 1893 and is buried in his family plot at Brookwood Cemetery, Surrey. In December 2007 a granite memorial was placed over his previously unmarked grave.

Thomas Hawksley was the first of four generations of eminent water engineers, having been followed into the profession by his son, Charles Hawksley, grandson Kenneth Phipson Hawksley, and great grandson, Thomas Edwin Hawksley (died 1972). The Institution of Mechanical Engineers still holds an annual lecture in his memory.

A memorial to him was placed in a stone wall at Rivington in 2023, the memorial reads 'In memory of Thomas Hawksley FRS, Civil Engineer and Architect, of the Rivington Reservoir System build 1850 to 1857' the memorial features masonic symbols.

== Bibliography ==
- Douet, J. (2023). The Architecture of Steam, Waterworks and the Victorian Sanitary Crisis. Liverpool University Press. ISBN 9781802077537.
- Uhler, B, et al. (2018). Pure and Constant, The Life and Legacy of Thomas Hawksley 1807-1893. Arima Publishing. ISBN 9781845493042.

Professional and academic associations
Preceded by Charles Blacker Vignoles	President of the Institution of Civil Engineers; December 1871 – December 1873	Succeeded by Thomas Elliot Harrison
Preceded by Sir Frederick Bramwell	President of the Institution of Mechanical Engineers; 1876–1877	Succeeded by John Robinson
