= Fewston =

Village and civil parish in North Yorkshire, England

Coordinates: 53°59′01″N 1°42′18″W

- Location within North Yorkshire
- Population: 182 (Including Blubberhouses. 2011 census)
- OS grid reference: SE177529
- Civil parish: Fewston
- Unitary authority: North Yorkshire
- Ceremonial county: North Yorkshire
- Region: Yorkshire and the Humber
- Country: England
- Sovereign state: United Kingdom
- Post town: HARROGATE
- Postcode district: HG3
- Police: North Yorkshire
- Fire: North Yorkshire
- Ambulance: Yorkshire

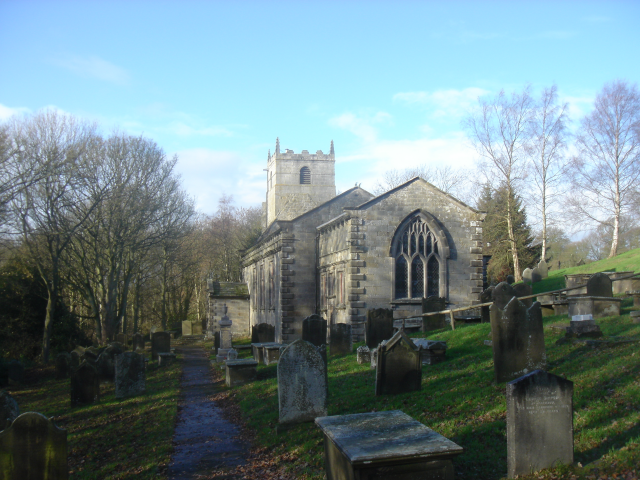
The village church

Fewston is a village and civil parish in the county of North Yorkshire, England. It is situated north of Otley and close to Swinsty and Fewston reservoirs.

St Michael and St Lawrence's Church, Fewston mostly dates from 1697, although the tower was built in the 14th century. The Washburn Heritage Centre, adjacent to the church, opened in February 2011.

== History ==
The name Fewston derives from either the Old Norse personal name Fotr or the Old English personal name Fot and the Old English tūn meaning 'settlement'.

Fewston was an ancient parish in the Forest of Knaresborough in the West Riding of Yorkshire. It covered a wide area, and included the townships of Blubberhouses, Clifton with Norwood, Great Timble, and Thruscross. All these places became separate civil parishes in 1866. Fewston was transferred to the new county of North Yorkshire in 1974. From 1974 to 2023 it was part of the Borough of Harrogate, it is now administered by the unitary North Yorkshire Council.

The poet Edward Fairfax lived at nearby New Hall, now submerged under the waters of Fewston Reservoir, as did Ferdinando Fairfax, 2nd Lord Fairfax of Cameron. Edward's daughters Elizabeth and Anne were baptised in the village church in 1606 and 1621 respectively, while Ferdinando's daughter Mary and son Charles were baptised there in 1606 and 1615.

== See also ==
- Listed buildings in Fewston
