= Thomas Sheppard (curator) =

British museum curator and amateur geologist (1876–1945)

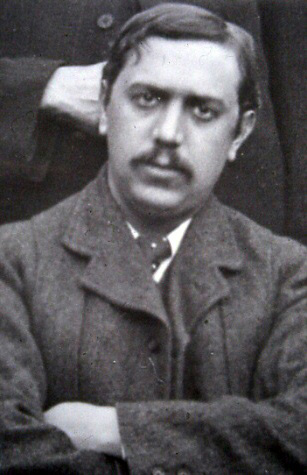
- Thomas Sheppard
- Born: 2 October 1876; South Ferriby, North Lincolnshire
- Died: 18 February 1945 (aged 68)
- Known for: Museum foundation and curation

Thomas Sheppard (2 October 1876 – 18 February 1945) was a British museum curator and amateur geologist, who founded several museums in Kingston upon Hull and in the East Riding of Yorkshire, England.

== Biography ==
Sheppard was born in South Ferriby, one of ten children of Harvey, schoolmaster and Myra (née Havercroft). His childhood included holidays spent with his uncle who was a collector of antiquities and fossils. He also accompanied William Greenwell on archaeological digs whilst still at school. Thomas was educated to elementary level in Hull. He worked as a railway clerk in Hull for 11 years, during which time he was self-educated, also attending classes in microscopy and preservation of specimens, natural history topics and geology.

Sheppard's employment by the railway (North Eastern Railway) gave him free travel on the company's lines, enabling him to visit sites of interest in the East Riding. Sheppard became acquainted with John Robert Mortimer, and in 1900 produced a catalogue of Mortimer's Driffield museum.

In 1901 he married Mary Isobel Osborn (b.1877), a son Harvey was born 1902.

In 1904 he became the first curator of the Hull Municipal Museum at the Royal Institution in Albion Street, Hull, which was based on the collection of the Hull Literary & Philosophical Society (founded 1822) which had been acquired by Hull Corporation. Sheppard closed the museum and refurbished it, re-opening it in 1902 without admission charges.

The museum was popular, with over 2000 visitors a week. Sheppard's character, coupled with the support of influential people led to the opening of further museums. Wilberforce House was opened in 1906, the Pickering Park Museum of Fisheries and Shipping (1912), (Note: See also Pickering Park, Kingston upon Hull and Christopher Pickering) the Commerce and Transport Museum (1925), the Easington Tithe Barn museum (1928), the Mortimer Museum (1929), and a Railway Museum in 1933. (Note: The railway museum as located in Hull Paragon railway station.) An 'Old Times Street' museum was also under development but destroyed before opening during the Second World War.

Sheppard's interests also extended to other fields including amateur dramatics, literary societies and geology.

Sheppard's health declined in the 1930s, and he gave up some honorary positions; he was noted as liking cigars and as having a love of whisky, possibly an alcoholic. He separated from his wife Mary Isobel in the early 1930s.

He retired in 1941, and died at home, four years later. He is commemorated with a green plaque on The Avenues, Kingston upon Hull.

== Legacy ==
The Wilberforce Museum, recalling the slave trade and abolitionists still exists, located at Wilberforce House; the "Pickering Park Museum of Fisheries and Shipping" collection moved to the Dock Office building in 1974, and now forms part of the Hull Maritime Museum; the "Museum of Commerce and Transport" collection now is part of the Streetlife Museum of Transport; the Mortimer Museum collection is part of the Hull and East Riding Museum.

Several of the Hull museums were badly damaged during the Hull Blitz of the Second World War. The Railway museum, and the un-opened 'Old Times Street' museum were destroyed, and the Municipal Museum building was gutted by fire. (Note: An excavation on the site of the Municipal Museum in the 1990s recovered many exhibits.)

Sheppard published numerous books and papers; primarily histories, catalogues, and introductory geological works; as well as many Hull museum publications. He was awarded several honorary life memberships and other honours including a Lyell Award from the London Geological Society. A partial list is given in Seaward (2008).

Sheppard has been described as a humorous individual, 'portly and jovial' in later years; a workaholic; with a good sense of self publicity and unscrupulous when collecting in the interests of his museums; occasionally arrogant and opinionated. A conflict with the Morfitt family of Atwick probably led him to wrongly label bone points collected in Holderness as fakes.
