= Charles Hawksley =

Civil engineer from Nottingham, England (1839–1917)

- Charles Hawksley
- Born: 1839
- Died: 1917 (aged 77–78)
- Engineering career
- Discipline: Civil,
- Institutions: Institution of Civil Engineers (president)
- Projects: Catcleugh Reservoir

Signature
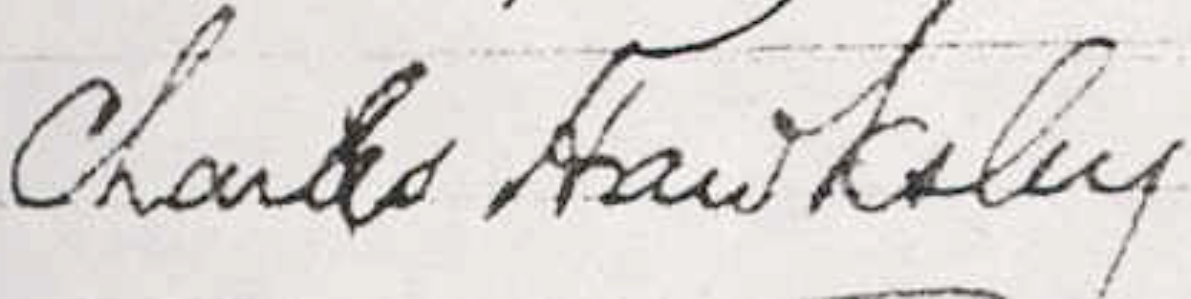

Charles Hawksley (1839–1917) was a British civil engineer. Hawksley was born in Nottingham, England in 1839 and was the son of civil engineer Thomas Hawksley. He studied at University College London and after graduating entered into apprenticeship with his father's firm, which had been established in 1852 and specialised in water related projects. From 1857 Hawksley was, with his father, an adviser to the Great Yarmouth Waterworks Company and in 1866 became a partner in his father's firm. Hawksley worked extensively in the water industry and clients included the Newcastle and Gateshead Water Company, Sunderland and South Shields Water Company, Consett Waterworks, Weardale and Shildon District Waterworks and Durham County Water Board. Hawksley, with his father, built the Catcleugh Reservoir in Northumberland for the Newcastle and Gateshead Water Company between 1899 and 1905. In addition to his work on reservoirs, pipes and other infrastructure for the water companies he also undertook work for the Bishop Auckland District Gas Company.

Hawksley became a member of the Smeatonian Society of Civil Engineers in 1897 and would serve as their president in 1911. He also served as the 38th president of the Institution of Civil Engineers from November 1901 to November 1902. In holding that office he followed in the footsteps of his father who had been the 16th president from December 1871 to December 1873. On 12 July 1907 Charles Hawksley established the Thomas Hawksley Fund on the centenary of his father's birth to provide a lasting memory for Thomas who had died in 1893. The fund was given to the Institution of Mechanical Engineers, of which whose council he was a member, which used it to provide an annual lecture and medal the first of which was presented on 5 December 1913. Hawksley gave £4000 to Imperial College London's department of civil engineering which was used to construct a hydraulics laboratory shortly after the First World War. Charles Hawksley died in 1917. The Institution of Civil Engineers awards the Charles Hawksley Prize in his honour.

Professional and academic associations
Preceded by James Mansergh	President of the Institution of Civil Engineers; November 1901 – November 1902	Succeeded by John Clarke Hawkshaw
