= Swinsty Reservoir =

Reservoir in North Yorkshire, England

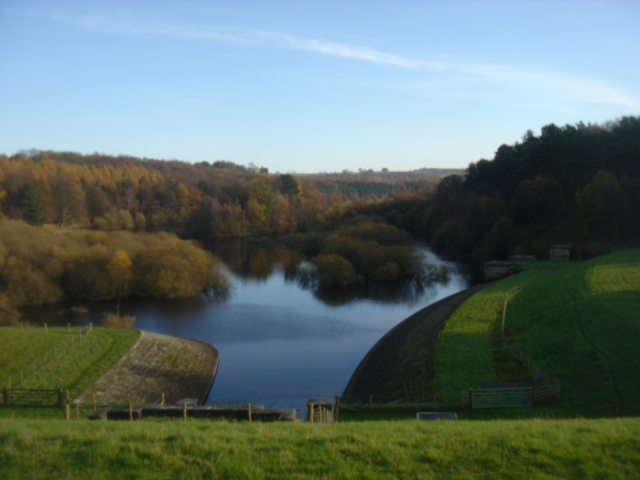
- Viewed from Fewston Dam in 2006

- Location within North Yorkshire
- Location: North Yorkshire
- Coordinates: 53.9753°N 1.7017°W
- Type: reservoir
- Basin countries: United Kingdom
- Surface area: 63 ha (160 acres)

Swinsty Reservoir is a reservoir in the Washburn valley north of Otley and west of Harrogate in Yorkshire, England. Construction began in 1871 and was completed in 1878. The capacity is about 866 million gallons, with a surface area of 63 hectares. It can be found from the A59 road.

The reservoir is below and directly adjoining Fewston Reservoir. The area around the reservoirs is popular with walkers.

== Before the reservoir ==
Beneath the waters of the reservoir are the remains of New Hall, originally a home to the Fairfax family, whose members included Ferdinando Fairfax and the poet Edward Fairfax.

Women in the nearby village of Timble were twice tried at York for witchcraft on the accusation of Edward, who suspected them of possessing his two daughters. Neighbouring Fewston Reservoir covers another Fairfax family home, Cragg Hall.

== Construction ==
The reservoir was built by Leeds Corporation Waterworks, and employed a labour force of around 300 men under the management of Robert Brooks, previously an assistant at the construction of Lindley Wood Reservoir. Consultants were Thomas Hawksley of Westminster and Edward Filliter of Leeds.

Work on the construction of the reservoir began in 1871. "The Huts", as they were known locally, were constructed to house the workforce, in part using materials from a water mill dismantled in the valley. The bulk of the materials for the dam itself came to Starbeck by rail. From there they were, at first, transported to the site using a steam traction engine pulling wagons. However, by 1872 this practice was put to an end due to the damage being caused to the 'Turnpike road', now the A59, and from then on materials were transported by contractors.

At the site, a narrow gauge railway was constructed, and two locomotives purchased, the first arriving in 1873 and the second in 1875.

The impact of the construction work was considerable for local residents, in ways both positive and negative. In his diaries, local man John Dickinson mentions the waterworks band coming with their music on Christmas Day, a visit to a "Magic Lantern performance at The Huts" and a waterworks sports day on Swinsty Moor with several hundred in attendance. On the downside, he complains several times of "rough navvies" occupying the local inn at Timble, and expresses the hope they will soon be gone.

As work neared completion in 1877, the huts were removed and the filling of the reservoir began. Work was finally completed in 1878.

== Design and architecture ==
Achelous watches over the reservoir

The reservoir is fed directly from the overflow of neighbouring Fewston Reservoir via a shallow spillway which bypasses Fewston Dam and terminates in a grand stepped cascade of falling water. The culvert under the dam itself terminates in an archway topped on the keystone with an ornate carving of the head of Achelous who stares out over the reservoir itself.

The water is held in place by a small dam on the eastern side, and a much larger one at the southern end, beyond which the River Washburn continues its descent to join the River Wharfe.

== Swinsty Hall ==
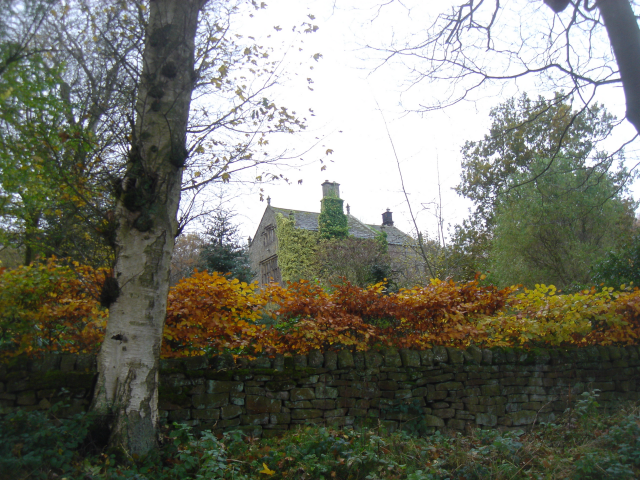
Swinsty Hall, on the bank of the reservoir

On the banks of the reservoir stands Swinsty Hall, built in the 17th century. Local legend has it that the hall was built by a man named Robinson, who left nearby Fewston to seek his fortune in London. On arriving there, he found it in the grip of the great plague of 1603–4. Robinson took to looting the houses of the dead and amassed a great fortune with which he returned home, purchased the Swinsty estate, and built Swinsty Hall.

The truth appears more mundane – a family named Wood owned the Swinsty estates in the sixteenth century, and Francis Wood undertook to erect a new hall on the estate as part of a marriage contract. Unable to pay for it, he raised a loan from Henry Robinson, and when he got into further financial difficulties in 1590, Robinson foreclosed and took the hall and estates in lieu of the debt.

The hall was owned by a succession of Robinsons right up until 1772. At this point, the male Robinson line came to an end and the hall and estate passed to Robert Bramley, husband of Mary Robinson, and later his son John Bramley, and in 1853 John Bramley's son, also named John. Stone for the construction of Fewston Reservoir was purchased from the Swinsty Hall quarry in 1874, from a Mr Bramley.

The hall is now owned and occupied by England football manager Gareth Southgate and his family.

== See also ==
- Listed buildings in Little Timble
