= Lindley Wood Reservoir =

Reservoir in North Yorkshire, England

Coordinates: 53°56′20″N 1°40′28″W

- Location within North Yorkshire
- Location: Yorkshire
- Type: Reservoir
- Primary inflows: River Washburn
- Primary outflows: River Washburn
- Basin countries: United Kingdom

Lindley Wood Reservoir is located in the Washburn Valley north of Otley in Yorkshire, England.

== History ==
The reservoir was built by navvies between 1869 and 1876. In about 1872 Elizabeth Garnett was moved by the living conditions of the workers and their families who were camped here building this reservoir. She opened a Sunday School at the site and within a year she resolved to move to the camp. She was joined in her work by the Reverend Lewis Moule Evans and together they founded was known as the "Navvies Mission".

The capacity is about 750,000,000 imperial gallons (3.4×10^{9} L; 900,000,000 US gal). It was the first of a chain of four reservoirs built along the River Washburn. While the three higher reservoirs provide water to the city of Leeds, Lindley Wood provides compensation flows to the Washburn.

In 2002/03, the dam crest was raised 9.8 feet (3 m) as the original height would have been overtopped during the Probable Maximum Flood (PMF). This was part of a £6.5 million scheme to make Swinsty, Fewston and Lindley Wood reservoirs meet improved flood standards. The reservoir keeper's house at the dam was originally planned to be demolished during this work, but was built into the new, higher crest as bats were found to be living there.

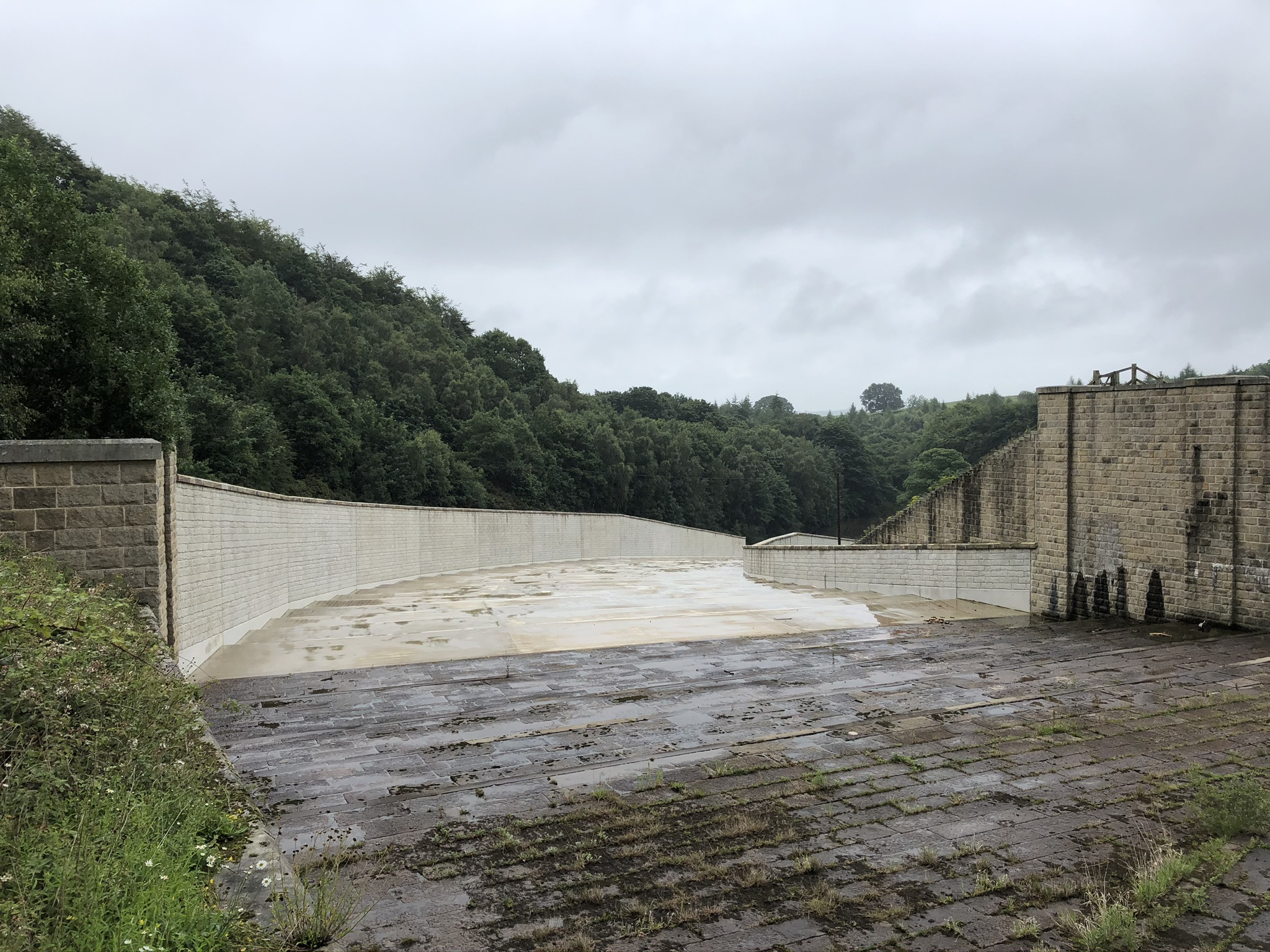
The upgraded spillway, pictured in July 2020, following completion of safety works.

During 2019/20, the spillway was relined, and the side walls were raised in a £5 million project to ensure the embankment dam was protected from erosion.

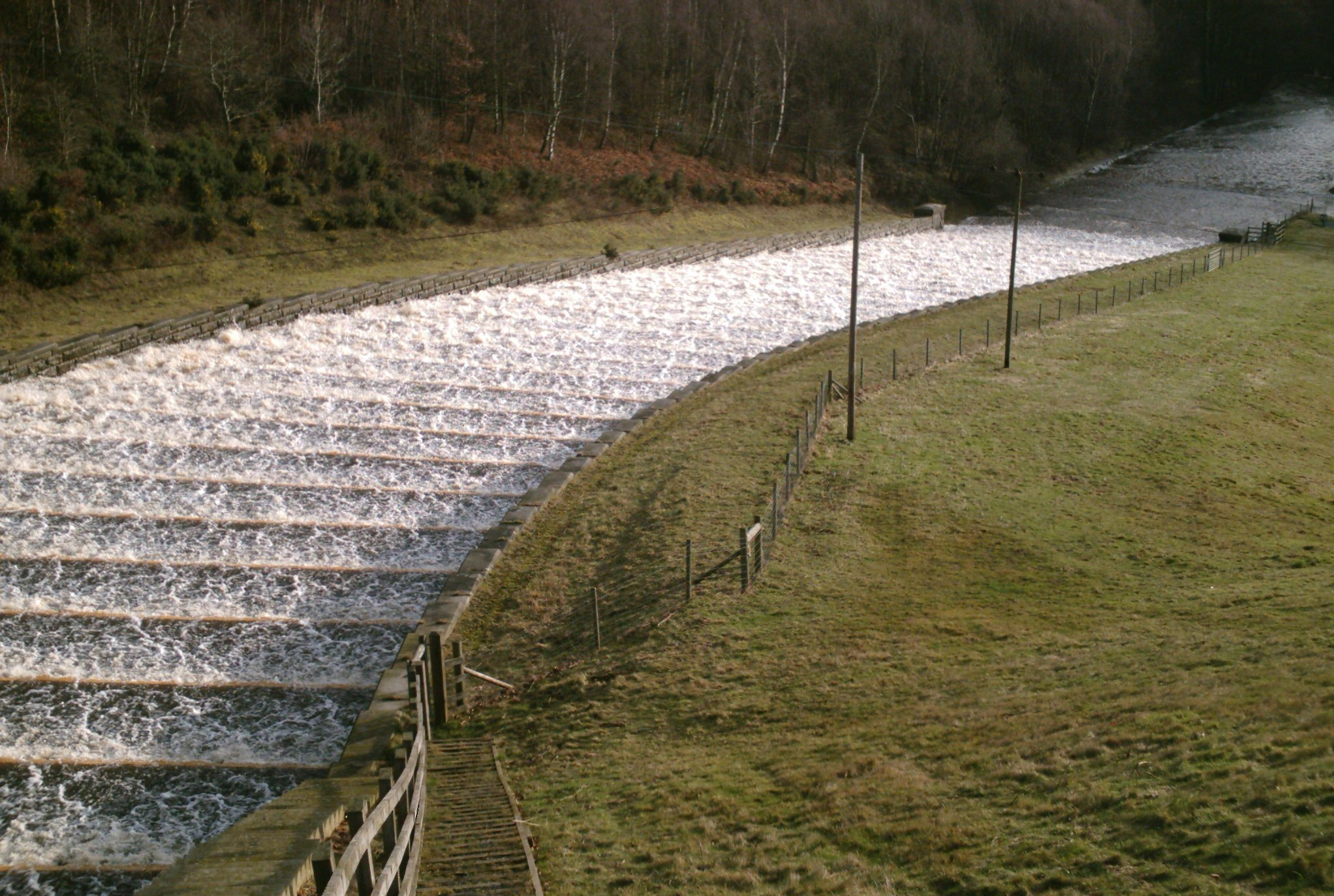
The spillway in full flow, pictured in 2008.
