= Edward Fairfax =

English translator (c. 1580 – 1635)

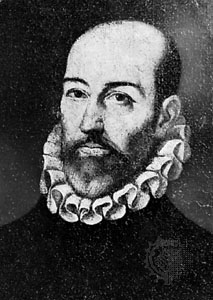
Edward Fairfax

Edward Fairfax (c. 1580 – 27 January 1635) was an English translator. He translated Torquato Tasso's Jerusalem Delivered. He also wrote an original work on demonology.

== Life ==
He was the natural son of Sir Thomas Fairfax the elder, of Denton in Yorkshire, and a half-brother of Thomas Fairfax, 1st Lord Fairfax of Cameron (1560–1640). Fairfax lived at New Hall, Fewston, near Harrogate, Yorkshire, England.

He is best known for his translation of Torquato Tasso's Jerusalem Delivered, considered a masterpiece. It is one of the comparatively few translations which in themselves are literature and was highly praised by John Dryden. The first edition appeared in 1600, and was dedicated to Queen Elizabeth I of England. Fairfax also wrote a treatise on demonology, in which he was a devout believer.

Edward's daughters Elizabeth and Anne were baptised in the village church of Fewston in 1606 and 1621 respectively. It is unknown when his eldest daughter Ellen was baptised.

== Notes ==
Attribution
