= Fewston Reservoir =

Reservoir in North Yorkshire, England

- Reservoir, with the overflow in the foreground

- Location within North Yorkshire
- Location: Yorkshire
- Coordinates: 53.9861°N 1.7246°W
- Type: reservoir
- Primary inflows: Washburn
- Primary outflows: Swinsty Reservoir
- Basin countries: United Kingdom

Fewston Reservoir is located in the Washburn valley north of Otley and west of Harrogate in Yorkshire, England. It was built in 1879. The capacity is about 3.5 million cubic metres. It can be found from the A59 road. The overflow from the reservoir feeds directly into the adjoining Swinsty Reservoir. Formerly, this overflow was encircled by a metal walkway from which floodboards could be lowered, but this has since been removed. The reservoir is the property of Yorkshire Water, which manages it for the benefit of walkers, anglers and wildlife. Situated in the charming Washburn valley, sharing an embankment with Swinsty Reservoir, Fewston is popular with walkers and runners. Cyclists and horse-riders can also make use of their own permitted tracks in the surrounding woodlands.

== Construction ==
The reservoir was built by Leeds Corporation Waterworks under the management of Robert Brooks. Consultants were Thomas Hawksley of Westminster and Edward Filliter of Leeds. Work began in 1874 and was completed in 1879.

Early in the work, Fewston Mill was demolished, as was West House Mill at Blubberhouses, with the stone going to build a wall around the reservoir. Much of the machinery, including the locomotives for the narrow gauge railway, came from the construction of neighbouring Swinsty Reservoir.

== Accessibility ==
There are accessible toilets at Swinsty Moor car park with accessible parking there and at Blubberhouses car park. There are no steps, stiles or gates and the reservoir features wide, well surfaced paths with only a few moderate inclines.
