= Hang East =

Ancient division of North Yorkshire, England

- Wapentake
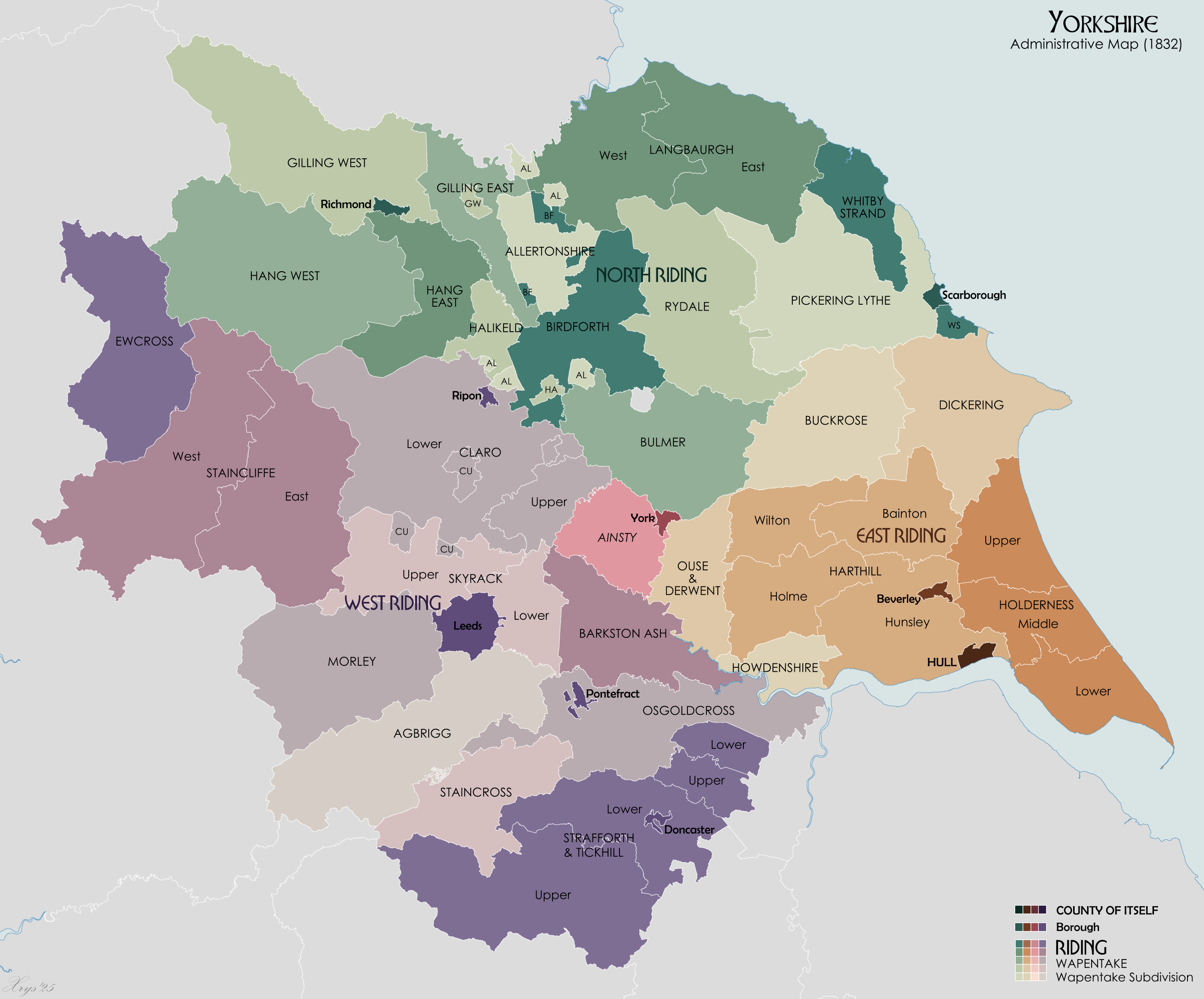
- Wapentakes of North Yorkshire. Hang East is a dark green colour on the top left.
- Subdivisions
  - Type: Nine parishes

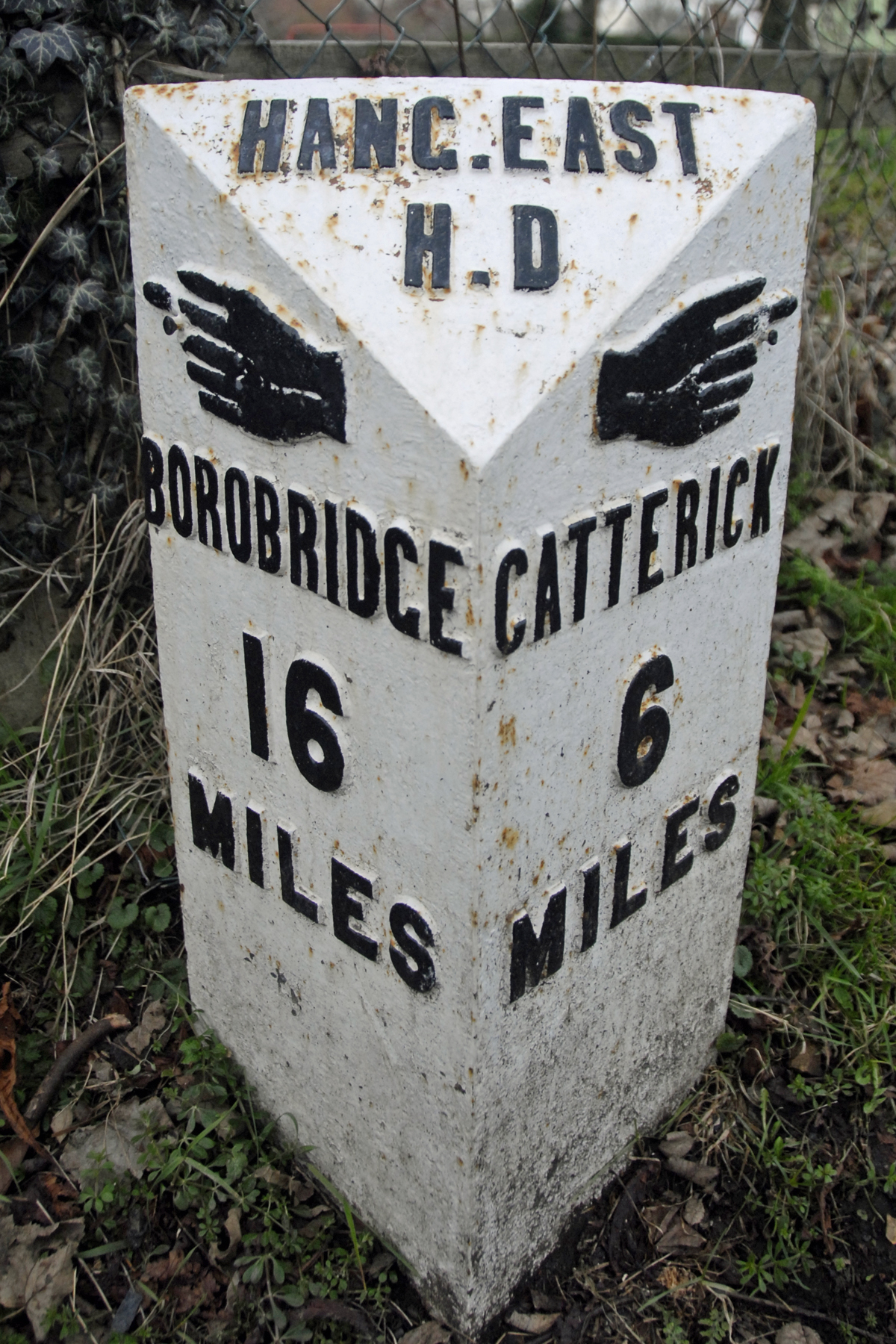
Sign at the crossroads in Leeming Bar. This is on Roman Road, the original A1 road

Hang East (Note: Sometimes referred to as East Hang.) was a Wapentake (Hundred), which is an administrative division (or ancient district), in the historic county of the North Riding of Yorkshire. It was one of the smaller wapentakes by area and consisted of nine parishes and two towns; Bedale and Masham.

== History ==
Hang East and Hang West were originally one wapentake (Hang), and formed part of the Honour of Richmond from the 11th century. Hang was divided into two in the 13th century; this is why Hang East wapentake derives its name from a hill which was no longer in its area. Its name derives from its meeting place of Hang Bank which was halfway between Hutton Hang and the village of Finghall. Hang is believed to derive from the Old English word Hangar which meant a wooded slope. The place is mentioned in the Domesday Book as Hotun.

Hang East was divided up into nine parishes; Bedale, Catterick, Hornby, Kirkby Fleetham, Masham, Patrick Brompton, Scruton, Thornton Watlass and Well. It was bordered to the south by Claro Wapentake and to the east by Hallikeld (Note: The spelling of this Wapentake varies between Halikeld and Hallikeld.) and Gilling East Wapentakes. To the north lay Richmond and Gilling West Wapentake with Hang West on its western edge.

In 1831, the Wapentake was measured as covering 64,000 acres (26,000 ha) and was 8 miles (13 km) across at its widest and was 15 miles (24 km) from north to south. It was chiefly agricultural in nature and possessed two market towns; Bedale and Masham. Its land was described as being more fertile and low-lying than Hang West wapentake (to the west) which contained steeper valleys and higher peaks. In modern times, the area that the Wapentake covered is divided between the Hambleton and Richmondshire districts of North Yorkshire.

== Settlements ==
The table below lists the settlements within the Hang East Wapentake. These are as listed in Bulmer's North Riding and White's History, Gazetteer, and Directory, of the East and North Ridings of Yorkshire.

(BP=Bedale Parish, CP=Catterick Parish, HP=Hornby Parish, KFP=Kirkby Fleetham Parish, MP=Masham Parish, PBP=Patrick Brompton Parish, SP=Scruton Parish, TWP=Thornton Watlass Parish, WP=Well Parish)

Name	Parish	Name	Parish	Name	Parish
Ainderby Myers with Holtby (Note: Modern day spelling is Ainderby Miers)	HP	Great Crakehall	BP	Patrick Brompton (Note: Was known as Brompton Patrick; part of the parish was in the wapentake of Hang West.)	PBP
Aiskew	BP	Hackforth	HP	Rand Grange	BP
Arrathorne	PBP	Healey-with-Sutton	MP	Rookwith	TWP
Bedale	BP	High Ellington	MP	St Martin's (Note: Was originally listed as being Hipswell and St Martin's Chapelry.)	CP
Brough	CP	Hipswell	CP	Scotton	CP
Burrell-cum-Cowling (Note: Modern day spelling is Burrill.)	BP	Hornby	HP	Scruton	SP
Burton-upon-Ure	MP	Ilton-cum-Pott	MP	Snape	WP
Catterick	CP	Killerby	CP	Swinton-with-Watermarsk (Note: Sometimes listed as Swinton Wathermarske.)	MP
Clifton-upon-Ure	TWP	Kirkby Fleetham	KFP	Thirn	TWP
Colbourn (Note: Modern day spelling is Colburn.)	CP	Langthorne	BP	Thornton Watlass	TWP
East Appleton	CP	Little Crakehall	BP	Tunstall	CP
Ellingstring	MP	Low Ellington	MP	Well	WP
Fearby	MP	Masham	MP	West Appleton	CP
Firby	BP	Newton-le-Willows	PBP		

Exelby with Leeming and Newton used to be in Hallikeld Wapentake, but was transferred to Hang East in the early 19th century, hence the sign on the road with Hang East instead of Hallikeld. The HD on the sign stands for Highway District (Hang East Highway District took its name from the wapentake) and the Highways District maintained the roads in the former Wapentake area.
