= Ellington =

Ellington may refer to:

== Places ==
=== United Kingdom ===
- Ellington, Cambridgeshire, a village and civil parish
- Ellington, Northumberland, a village
- Ellington High and Low, a civil parish in North Yorkshire
  - High Ellington
  - Low Ellington

=== United States ===
- Ellington, Connecticut, a town
- Ellington Township, Adams County, Illinois
- Ellington Township, Hancock County, Iowa
- Ellington, Missouri, a city
- Ellington, New York, a town
- Ellington Township, Michigan
- Ellington Township, Dodge County, Minnesota
- Ellington, Wisconsin, a town

=== Elsewhere ===
- Ellington (crater), on the planet Mercury

== People ==
=== Surname ===
- Andre Ellington (born 1989, American former football player
- Brandon Ellington (born 1980), American politician
- Brian Ellington (born 1990), American baseball player
- Bruce Ellington (born 1991), American former football player
- Buford Ellington (1907–1972), Governor of Tennessee from 1959 to 1963
- Charles Ellington (born 1952), British zoologist
- Douglas Ellington (1886–1960), American architect
- Edward Kennedy "Duke" Ellington (1899–1974), American jazz pianist, composer and bandleader
- Edward Ellington (1877–1967), Marshal of the British Royal Air Force
- Edward B. Ellington (1845–1914), British hydraulic engineer
- Erik Ellington (born 1977), professional skateboarder
- James Ellington (born 1985), British retired sprinter
- James Ellington (politician) (born 1943), American politician
- Joe Ellington (born 1959), American politician
- John B. Ellington Jr., former general in the Air National Guard
- John J. Ellington (born 1960), American associate justice of the Supreme Court of Georgia
- Lance Ellington (born 1957) English singer, songwriter and actor, son of Ray Ellington
- Lee Ellington (born 1980), English former footballer
- Marc Ellington (1945–2021), American-born British folk and folk-rock singer-songwriter, guitarist and bagpiper
- Mercer Ellington (1919–1996), American composer, trumpeter and bandleader
- Nathan Ellington (born 1981), English professional footballer
- Noble Ellington (born 1942), Louisiana state legislator and cotton merchant - see Louisiana Political Museum and Hall of Fame
- Ray Ellington (1916–1985), English singer, drummer and bandleader, a.k.a. Harry Pitts Brown
- Wayne Ellington (born 1987), American basketball player

=== Given name ===
- Ellington Ratliff (born 1993), American drummer and actor
- Ellington Sabin (born 1981), Dominican football manager

== Arts and entertainment ==
- Ellington (band), an Australian indie pop band formed in 2006
- Ellington Jazz Club, a music venue in Perth, Western Australia
- Ellington (TV series), a 1994–1996 British TV series
- Ellington Feint, a character from Lemony Snicket's All the Wrong Questions

== Other uses ==
- Ellington Electronics Technology Group, a printed circuit boards manufacturer from China
- Ellington Management Group, a multi-billion dollar hedge fund firm
- Ellington (horse), a Thoroughbred racehorse, winner of the 1856 Epsom Derby
- Ellington (typeface), a font designed by Michael Harvey
- Ellington Agricultural Center, Brentwood, Tennessee, U.S.
- USS Ellington (SP-776), a United States Navy patrol boat in commission from 1917 to 1919
- Ellington Airport (disambiguation)
- Ellington Colliery, a former coal mine in Northumberland, England

== See also ==
- Allington (disambiguation)
