= Colsterdale Light Railway =

Disused railway line in Yorkshire, England

Coordinates: 54.218°N 1.710°W

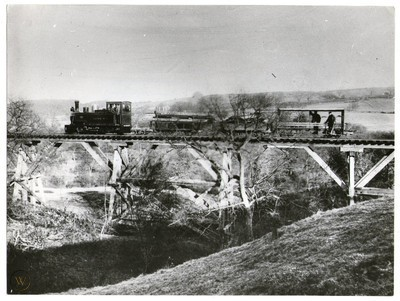
- A train on the CLR

Overview
- Status: Closed
- Locale: Masham, North Yorkshire, England
- Termini: Masham railway station

History
- Commenced: 1903
- Completed: 1905

Technical
- Line length: 6 mi (9.7 km)
- Number of tracks: 1
- Track gauge: 2 ft (610 mm)

The Colsterdale Light Railway (CLR) was a narrow-gauge railway line in Colsterdale, North Yorkshire, England. It was built between 1903 and 1905 to allow materials to be taken up the Colsterdale valley for reservoir building. The building of two reservoirs (Roundhill, and later Leighton) in the valley of the River Burn, was first approved for the councils of Harrogate and Leeds respectively in 1901. Construction on the second reservoir was halted during the First World War, although the railway was kept in use carrying men and supplies to the training camp, later a PoW camp, at Breary Banks.

== History ==
Harrogate Waterworks Tramroad Act 1904
- Act of Parliament
- Parliament of the United Kingdom
- Long title: An Act to empower the Corporation of Harrogate to construct a temporary tramroad telephonic communication and other works in connection with their Waterworks and for other purposes.
- Citation: 4 Edw. 7. c. clii

Dates
- Royal assent: 1 August 1904

Other legislation
- Repealed by: Claro Water Board Order 1958

Status: Repealed

Text of statute as originally enacted

Initially, Harrogate Corporation built a small railway yard near to what would become the site of Leighton Reservoir. This ran along up the valley to the site of their reservoir at Roundhill (some 1.75 miles (2.82 km) distant), and connected with the quarries on the high hillside of Colsterdale (on the southern flank). The yard at Leighton was a transhipment point from road to rail, but complaints about parking of steam traction engines in Masham town centre, and the "havoc wrought by traction engines [on the road between Masham and Leighton]", led to the development of the light railway connecting Masham railway station and the narrow gauge line at Leighton, engineered by Edward Wilson Dixon. Initially, Leeds Corporation petitioned to build a standard-gauge railway, and the Harrogate Corporation wanted to stay with their 2-foot (0.61 m) gauge line. Both corporations submitted bills before Parliament, but Harrogate were successful, and the Harrogate Waterworks Tramroad Act 1904 (4 Edw. 7. c. clii) was passed. (Note: This was approved as the Harrogate Waterworks Tramroad.) after some negative press regarding why Leeds and Harrogate could not come to some understanding, and then, they had to negotiate with the North Eastern Railway about a connection with their terminus in Masham. The many river and stream crossings taken by the railway were on wooden trestle bridges, but the bridge over the River Ure at Masham needed specific reinforcement against the heavy flow of the river. Inward and outward bound traffic was swapped over in a yard to the north of Masham railway station, and from there, the line extended some 6 miles (9.7 km) up the valley.

Roundhill Reservoir was started and completed first by Harrogate Corporation Waterworks, whose aqueduct to carry water south into Nidderdale was also furnished with a 2 ft (610 mm) railway in the tunnel. Leeds Corporation Waterworks bought the rolling stock and line from Harrogate after the completion of Roundhill. Leeds initially intended to build one of their reservoirs in a side valley to the north of Roundhill at Spruce Gill Beck, however, the geological conditions were found not to be unstable in that area, so a reformed plan involved building Leighton Reservoir first below the outfall of Roundhill, with a catchwater drain bringing water from Spruce Gill. Before the location change, Leeds had already built the extension up to what was Breary Banks Camp, and although the reservoir would be in the adjacent valley, navvies were billeted at Breary Banks, which involved the Paddy Mail trains (workman's train) having to reverse at Leighton Junction. The beginner for their project was Charles Henzell, who along with a consultant engineer, recommended that the reservoir at Spruce Gill (known as Colsterdale Reservoir on the plans) be abandoned. During the 1910 Leighton reservoir building phase, the railway was carrying between 500 tonnes (550 tons) and 700 tonnes (770 tons) of goods per week. Typical freight transhipped at Masham Exchange Yard included timber, coal and cement, with cement accounting for the heaviest traffic on the line.

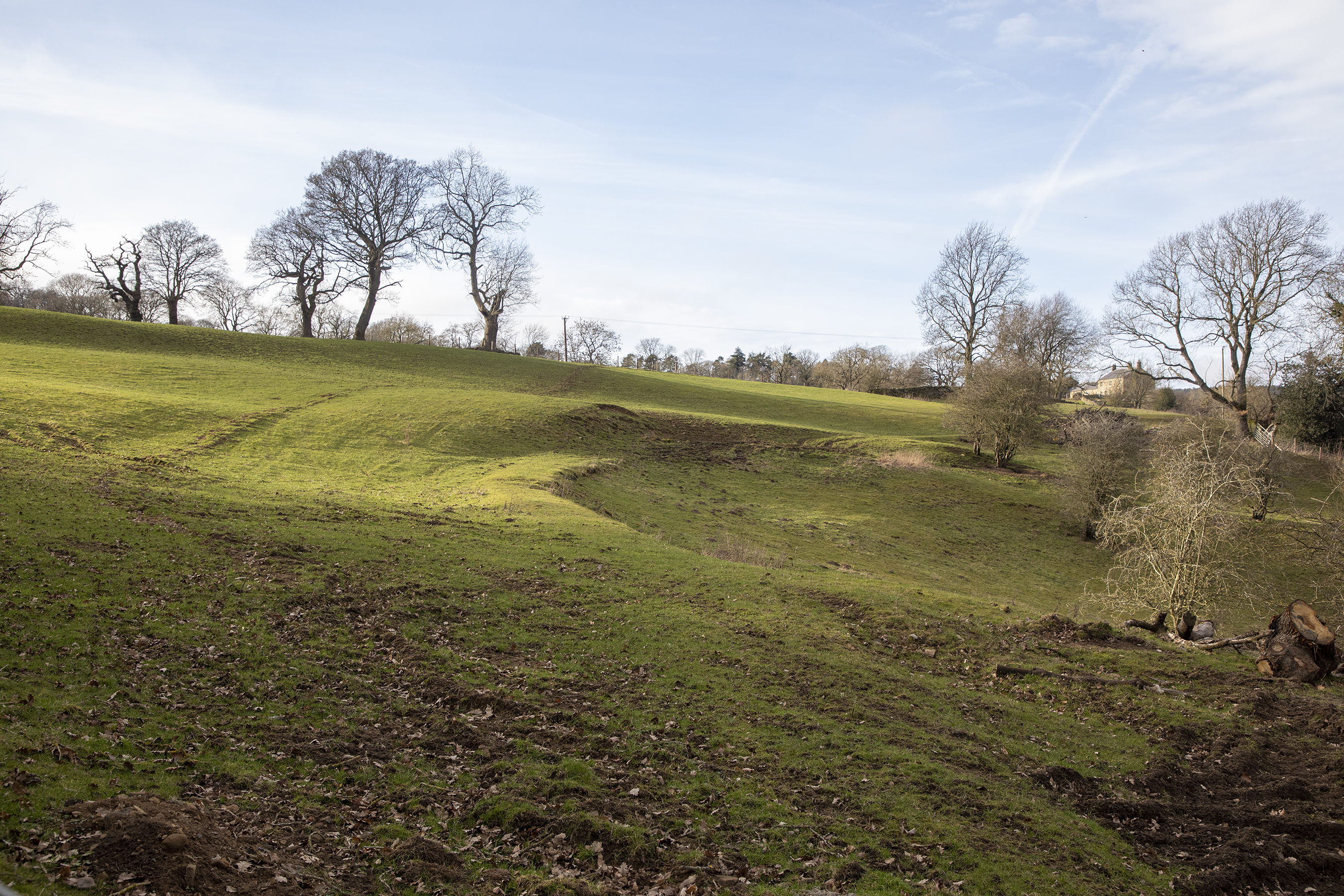
Leighton Junction - the curve in the middle is the former trackbed

On 29 May 1911, one of the Harrogate engines was caught on the trestle of the bridge over a stream below the Leighton dam site. It derailed just before the bridge killing one of the footplate crew. It was carrying several passengers, and despite the driver informing the manager that the load was too much (he reckoned about 20 tonnes (22 tons) behind a locomotive weighing 7 tonnes (7.7 tons)), the consist proceeded down the valley from Roundhill Dam, picking up speed on the 1-in-30 downhill section. The driver later attested that he could feel the weight of the train behind pushing his engine.

In 1914, on the outbreak of the First World War, work on Leighton Reservoir slowed down as workers joined up to fight. The encampment at Breary Banks was commandeered by the army to house training for the Leeds Pals, and in 1915, work on the reservoir stopped completely, although the railway was kept in use to bring supplies to the Breary Banks Camp for 1,000 men, and was also used to ferry soldiers to and from Masham railway station on occasion. Passenger workings consisted of Paddy Mail trains and occasional specials for the families of the workers on the reservoirs. In 1917, the huts at Breary Banks were converted into a Prisoner of War camp.

Work on the reservoir resumed in 1919, and the reservoir was completed in 1926, with the rolling stock and tracks removed by 1932. The passenger service along the former North Eastern Railway branch to Masham had also ceased in 1931.
