= Ilton, North Yorkshire =

Village in North Yorkshire, England

Coordinates: 54.200°N 1.71°W

Ilton
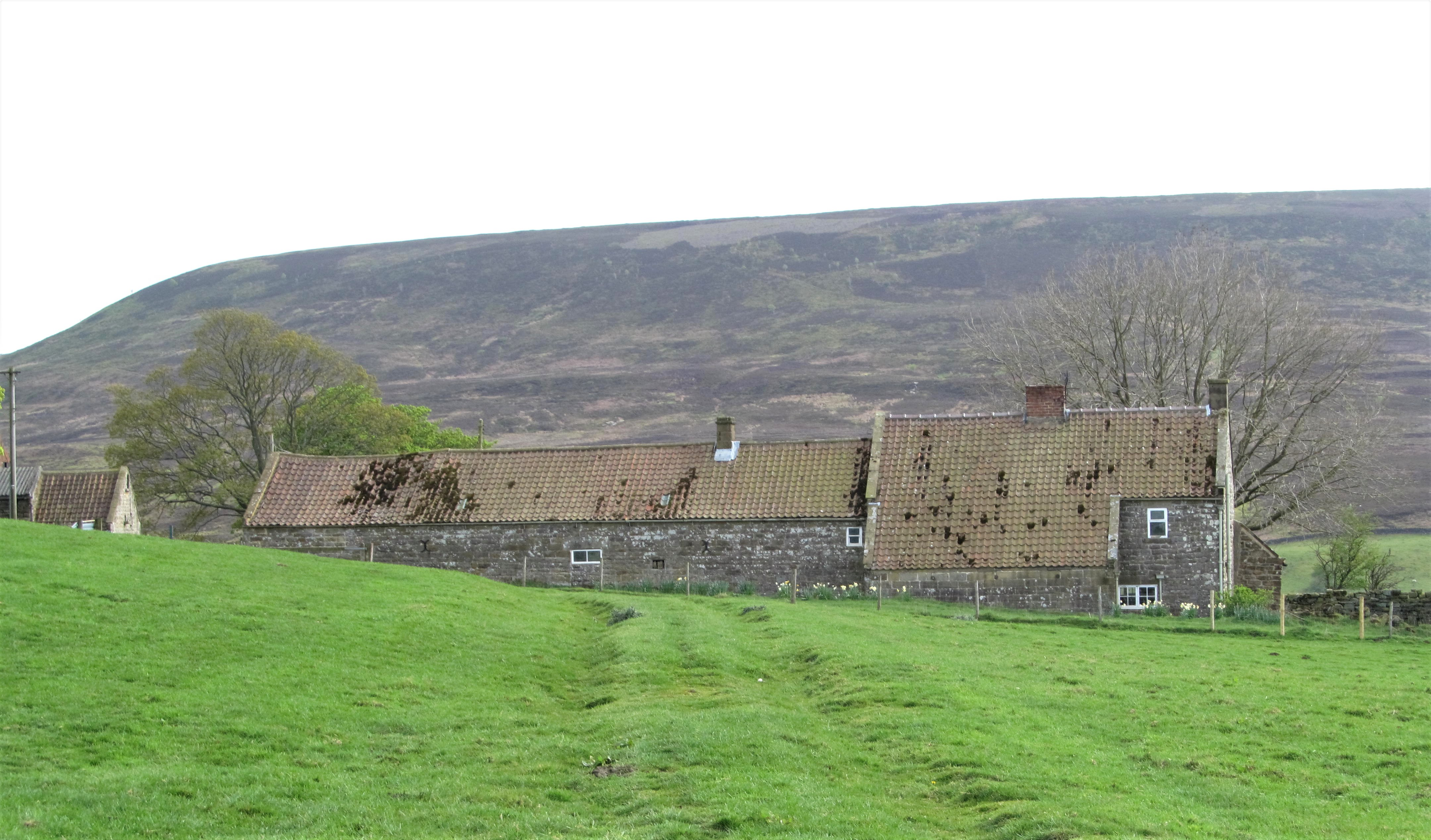
- Farm on the village outskirts

- Location within North Yorkshire
- Population: 50
- OS grid reference: SE191782
- Civil parish: Ilton cum Pott
- Unitary authority: North Yorkshire
- Ceremonial county: North Yorkshire
- Region: Yorkshire and the Humber
- Country: England
- Sovereign state: United Kingdom
- Post town: RIPON
- Postcode district: HG4
- Dialling code: 01765
- Police: North Yorkshire
- Fire: North Yorkshire
- Ambulance: Yorkshire

Ilton is a village in North Yorkshire, England, 3 miles south-west of Masham. It is the principal settlement in the civil parish of Ilton cum Pott. The parish includes Roundhill Reservoir. The population of the parish was estimated at 50 in 2015.

== History ==
The name is recorded in the Domesday Book as Ilcheton, meaning "settlement of a man called Ylca".

In the Middle Ages Fountains Abbey held land in Ilton, and also had a grange at Pott, 2.3 miles (3.7 km) west of Ilton. Following the Dissolution in the 16th century Sir Thomas Danby acquired the land at Pott, and in 1658 a later Sir Thomas Danby bought the Ilton land, which has since formed part of the Swinton estates.

Although Ilton and Pott were detached from each other, they formed a single township in Mashamshire, the large ancient parish of Masham, in the North Riding of Yorkshire. Ilton cum Pott became a separate civil parish in 1866. In 1934 a large area of Masham Moor between the two parts of the parish was added to the parish. Until 1974 Ilton was part of Masham Rural District (before 1934 Masham Urban District). In 1974 the parish was transferred to the new county of North Yorkshire.

From 1974 to 2023 it was part of the Borough of Harrogate, it is now administered by the unitary North Yorkshire Council.

== Governance ==
The parish now shares a grouped parish council, known as Fearby, Healey and District Parish Council, with Colsterdale, Ellingstring, Fearby and Healey.

== Druids' Temple ==
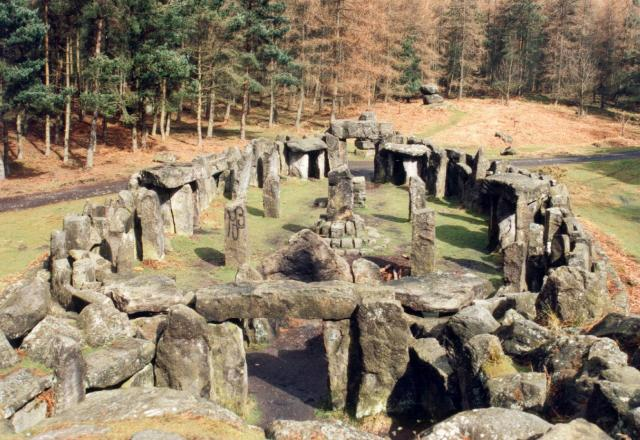
Ilton Druid's Temple

Near the village is the Druids' Temple, a replica of Stonehenge built in about 1800 by William Danby of nearby Swinton Park. During a time of agricultural depression and high unemployment, Danby hired local men to construct a moderately large-scale replica of Stonehenge, working at a full shilling a day. The result is a folly of national reputation. He was less successful in hiring a silent druidic hermit to fulfill a seven-year contract, though several tried, for the promised annuity. The folly is still owned by the Swinton Estate.

== See also ==
- Listed buildings in Ilton-cum-Pott
