= Colsterdale towers =

Set of sighting towers in North Yorkshire, England

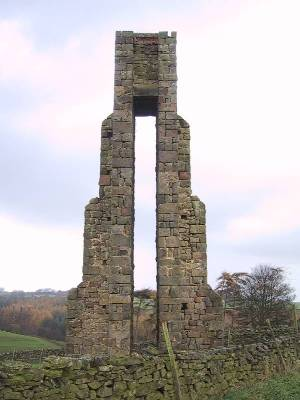
Front view

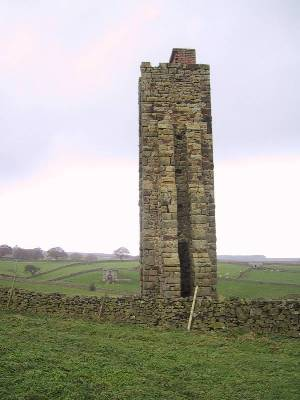
Side view

The Colsterdale towers are a set of sighting towers in and around Colsterdale, North Yorkshire, England.

These sighting towers were used to conduct surveys during the construction of Leighton reservoir and Roundhill reservoir, other proposed reservoirs and accompanying pipelines.

Visible from Roundhill Reservoir and Leighton Reservoir above Arnagill Crags is a stone sighting tower built over an aqueduct near a water-pumping station. The similar Carle Tower is 1.9 miles (3 km) southeast just above Wandley Gill, Carlesmoor Sighting Tower is a further 1.2 miles (2 km) east and another sighting tower to the north is long since gone, having been constructed of wood. The Greygarth Monument is also in the area, commemorating Queen Victoria's Diamond Jubilee in 1897.

== Erection ==
The sighting towers were erected to conduct surveys — the steep-sided valley of Dallowgill was once a proposed reservoir site — and as references for construction of the pipeline over hill and dale toward Harrogate. The pipe begins at the bottom of a small catchments reservoir above Spout Gill Farm and flows to Roundhill Reservoir, where it meets the dam overflow pipe that runs to Carlesmoor and empties into the River Laver.

== Reservoirs ==
The reservoirs were built by the Harrogate Corporation Waterworks between 1895 and 1911. The Leeds Corporation explored construction of another reservoir to the north-west in Colsterdale but the proposal was rejected owing to concerns over lead and coal mines in the area. The narrow-gauge Colsterdale Waterworks Light Railway built in 1901 as a supply line from Masham to Roundhill Reservoir closed in 1926 and was removed in 1932 (after being used during World War I for troop transport to the Leeds Pals camp at Breary Banks just north of Leighton) but is still evident on the south side of the dale.

== See also ==
- Listed buildings in Ilton-cum-Pott
