= Firby =

Firby may refer to:

- Firby, Bedale, historically in the North Riding, south of Bedale, North Yorkshire, England
- Firby, Westow, historically in the East Riding, south-west of Malton, North Yorkshire, England
- Firby (surname)
- SS Firby, a ship wrecked in September 1939

== See also ==
- Fearby, a village south-west of Firby, Hambleton, UK
- Furby, a toy
