= Arnagill Tower =

Tower in Ilton-cum-Pott, North Yorkshire, England

Coordinates: 54°10′38″N 1°46′05″W

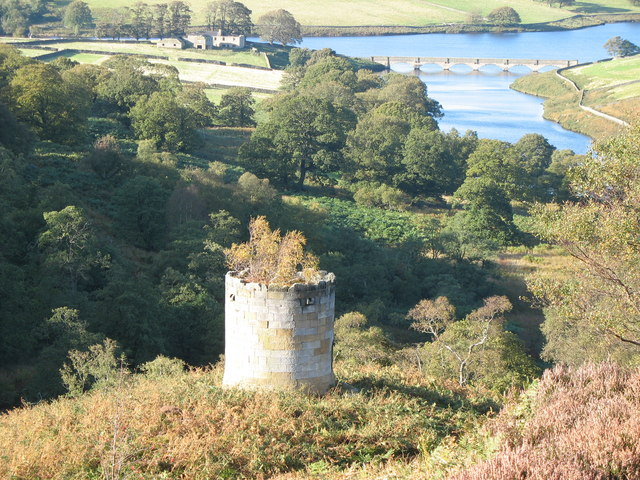
The tower, in 2009

Arnagill Tower is a historic building in Ilton-cum-Pott, a civil parish in North Yorkshire, in England.

The folly was built in 1824 on Masham Moor, to a design by John Foss. It is a round tower, with walls terminating about 10 feet (3.0 m) from the ground, to resemble a ruin. It has one storey, and contains a doorway and three windows, all arched. It is described by Gwyn Headley as a "Gothic mood piece", linked with the nearby Druid's Temple. It was grade II listed in 1986.

== See also ==
- Listed buildings in Ilton-cum-Pott
