= River Burn, North Yorkshire =

River in North Yorkshire, England

River Burn Bourne Burne (archaic)
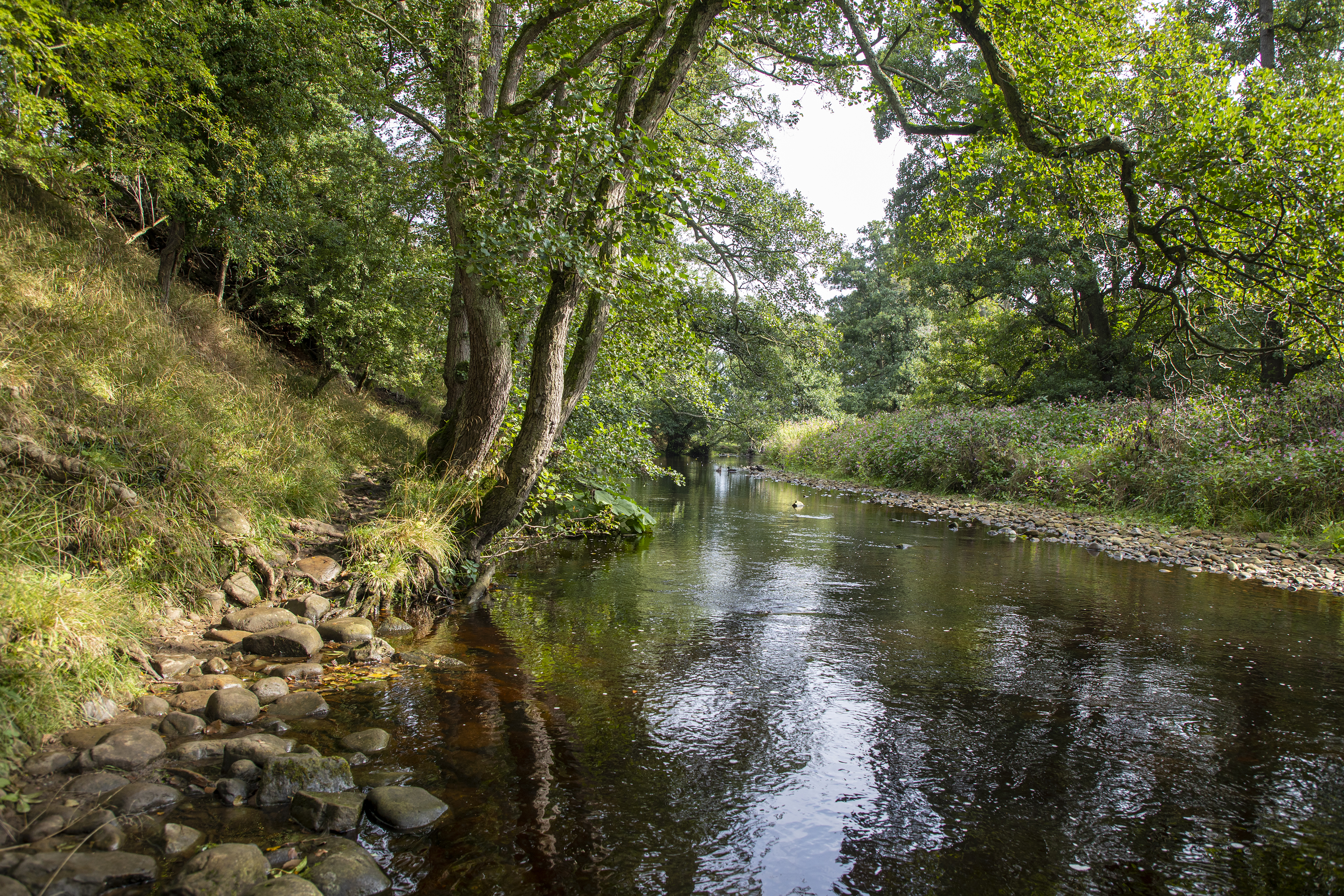
- River Burn near Masham

- Location of river mouth

Location
- United Kingdom: England
- County: North Yorkshire

Physical characteristics
- Source
  - location: Little Haw
  - coordinates: 54°12′08.4″N 1°51′36.1″W
  - elevation: 1,509 feet (460 m)
- Mouth: River Ure
  - location: Masham
  - coordinates: 54°12′46.9″N 1°38′51.4″W
  - elevation: 230 feet (70 m)
- Length: 12 miles (19 km)
- Basin size: 27 square miles (69.5 km^{2})

Basin features
- River system: River Ure
- Tributaries
  - left: Slee House Gill; House Gill; Low Gill; Birk Gill Beck; How Gill; Gir Beck; Sinney Keld; Swinney Beck
  - right: Spruce Gill Beck; Pott Beck; Sole Beck; Eller Beck; Den Beck
- Waterfalls: High House Farm

The River Burn is a river that flows wholly within North Yorkshire, England. The river starts as several small streams on Masham Moor and drains Colsterdale flowing eastwards before emptying into the River Ure just south of Masham. Conservation work on removing a weir, and introducing fish to the river in 2016, has meant that salmon have been recorded spawning in the river for the first time in over 100 years.

Whilst the River Burn valley is not in Nidderdale, almost all of it is included in the Nidderdale Area of Outstanding Natural Beauty.

== History ==
During the Ice Age, a glacier forced water to build up in what are now the valleys that hold the Pott Beck and the River Burn. This created large lakes that deposited minerals such as limestone and chert. The river flows over several types of bedrock (limestone, sandstone, mudstone and shale) which is covered by gravel and silty clay which is a result of riverine alluvia. When tested in the 1990s, this alluvia was found to be the largest and coarsest of all sediment that was flowing out through the Humber basin.

The name of the river is from the Old English Burna (literally meaning a beck or a brook) and has been written variously as either Bourne, Burne or Burn. Curiously, unlike most other of the Yorkshire Dales, the name of the river does not lend itself to the valley that it flows through (Colsterdale). (Note: Wensleydale is the other major oddity, but it was named Uredale/Yoredale for some time.) The valley acquired its name in the 12th century when coal was mined in the upper reaches and transported down the valley by a track known as The Coal Road, which still exists today. The dale is sometimes called the Burn Valley or the River Burn Valley.

A desire to site reservoirs on the River Burn itself had been in the minds of the planners of the Leeds Corporation as far back as the turn of the 20th century. Work started on building a reservoir in 1904 at Gollinglith Foot, but had to be abandoned in 1906 due to landslips.

In 2016, a £20,000 project to remove a weir at Breary Banks on the river was completed. It was reported in 2017 that salmon had managed to negotiate this part of the river and spawn there for the first time in over 100 years. The project was part financed by ABP as part of the wider Green Port Hull Project which was initiated to aid migratory fish through the Humber Basin.

To help with this project, the Ure Salmon Trust released over 30,000 salmon smolts into the river to encourage adult salmon to return in later years. The removal of the weir would also benefit other fish (sea trout, brown trout, grayling, elvers, bullhead, stoneloach and brook lamprey) to migrate further upriver to reproduce. The damming of Pott Beck to create the reservoirs at Leighton and Roundhill, had a detrimental effect on the migration of the fish through Colsterdale.

== Catchment area ==
The river travels for 12 miles (19 km) and drains over 27 square miles (69.5 km^{2}) of moorland and farmland as it flows towards the River Ure. The river has been designated as being "heavily modified" by the Environment Agency and the water quality is moderate but projected to be good by 2027. Along with the rivers Bain, Cover, Laver, Skell and Tutt, the river is noted as being one of the main tributaries of the River Ure.

== Course ==
The valley that the river runs through has been described as an "exquisite valley". The river starts on the moorland west of Masham and astride the watershed that feeds water to Coverdale (to the north) and Nidderdale (to the south). It is named the River Burn from where New House Gill and Thorny Crane Gill meet, however it has been traditionally taken as starting as a small fountain on the hill of Great Haw. The river flows at first across the peat moorland which overlies the coal measures and millstone grit beneath, and over waterfalls at High House Farm. The cascades around High House Farm have revealed the Red Scar Grit Sandstone that overlies the coal and both sandstone and coal were mined and quarried in the area; most of these workings were down in the steep valley carved by the river.

This upper section flows through a narrow V-shaped valley that rises from 591 feet (180 m) from the riverbed to 1,083 feet (330 m) at the rim of the valley. This section of the river is designated as part of the East Nidderdale Moors SSSI because of the ancient woodland at Birks Gill, the birdlife and fauna it supports.

Below Leighton the river is joined by its largest tributary, Pott Beck, which has been heavily modified for clean water purposes with the building of the two reservoirs at Leighton and Roundhill. Where the Pott Beck joins, the river valley leaves Colsterdale, flattens out and becomes less steep sided and craggy. The river runs east through farmland towards Masham and is also home to three ancient, semi-natural woodlands; Hall Wood, Fearby Low Moor and Hawkswell Wood.

As the river passes through Masham Golf Course (which straddles both banks of the river) it flows under the grade II listed High Burn Bridge. Just before the river flows into the Ure, it passes under Low Burn Bridge which carries the road between Masham and Grewelthorpe. The present bridge was built in 1715 and is now a grade II listed structure. A bridge had existed here previously but was only wide enough to take a single horse and was widened when financed by a local man in his will in 1623. The river joins the Ure just south of Masham town and the section of bedrock it flows over at this point is magnesian limestone deposits.

== Economy ==
The river valley forms part of the Swinton Estate and the river is used extensively for fishing and has many access points.

As with many other rivers, the Burn Valley was home to several mills and industries that were water powered. The former saw mill at Healey is now a grade II listed dwelling. Just west of the saw-mill site is Swinton Trout Farm which supplies trout for the fishing on the Swinton Estate and at Leighton Reservoir.

The weir at Breary banks was constructed to allow for the collection of fresh water for the navvy construction camps at Leighton and Roundhill for the reservoirs. This was later used for the same purposes at the army camp at Breary Banks when recruits from Leeds (the Leeds Pals) were training for the First World War. Both the weir and the waterwheel were the subject of an archaeological study before the weir was removed in 2016.
