= Healey, North Yorkshire =

Village and civil parish in North Yorkshire, England

Coordinates: 54°13′16″N 1°43′23″W

Healey
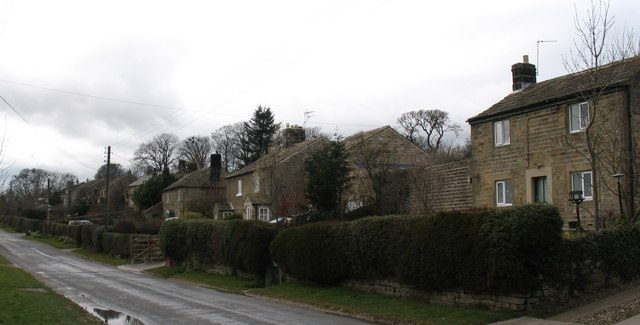
- The main, indeed only, street in Healey

- Location within North Yorkshire
- Population: 100
- OS grid reference: SE181806
- Civil parish: Healey
- Unitary authority: North Yorkshire
- Ceremonial county: North Yorkshire
- Region: Yorkshire and the Humber
- Country: England
- Sovereign state: United Kingdom
- Post town: RIPON
- Postcode district: HG4
- Police: North Yorkshire
- Fire: North Yorkshire
- Ambulance: Yorkshire

Healey is a small village and civil parish in the county of North Yorkshire, England. It is situated in the valley of the River Burn, to the immediate west of Fearby. It is about three miles west of Masham in the Nidderdale Area of Outstanding Natural Beauty. There are several holiday cottages and four Grade II Listed buildings, one of which is Healey Mill, a former corn mill.

The civil parish includes Leighton Reservoir, the hamlet of Leighton, the hamlet of Gollinglith Foot in the lower part of Colsterdale and a large area of Masham Moor, a grouse moor, rising to the summit of Great Haw, 6.5 miles (10.5 km) from the village at the western extremity of the parish. The population of the parish was estimated at 100 in 2013.

== History ==
Healey was historically a township in the large ancient parish of Masham in the wapentake of Hang East in the North Riding of Yorkshire. Healey became a separate ecclesiastical parish in 1849. The civil parish of Healey with Sutton was formed in 1866. Sutton consists of a few farms (High Sutton, Low Sutton, Sutton Penn and Sutton Grange) 2 miles (3 km) north-east of Healey, and was transferred to the parish of Ellington High and Low in 1886. In 1934 3,213 acres (1,300 ha) of the uninhabited Masham Moor (which had been common to the parishes of Masham and East Witton) were added to the civil parish, which was then renamed Healey.

== Governance ==
Until 1974 Healey was part of Masham Rural District (before 1934 Masham Urban District) in the North Riding of Yorkshire. From 1974 to 2023 it was part of the Borough of Harrogate, it is now administered by the unitary North Yorkshire Council.

The parish now shares a grouped parish council, known as Fearby, Healey and District Parish Council, with Colsterdale, Fearby, Ellingstring and Ilton cum Pott.

== Church ==
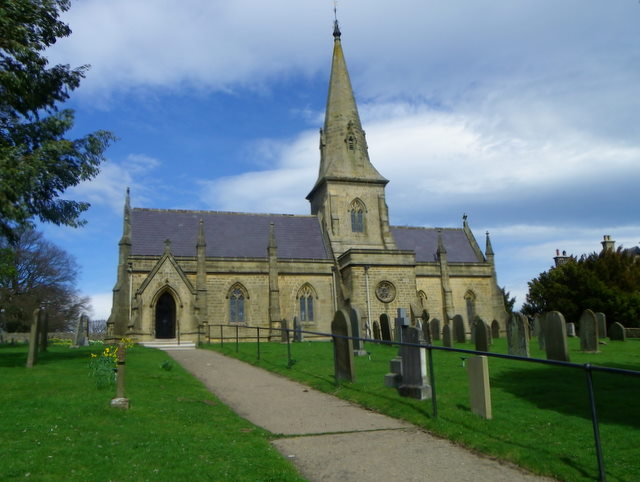
St Paul's parish church

St Paul's Church, Healey, is a Grade II* Listed building completed in 1848. It was designed in the decorative style by the Victorian architect Edward Buckton Lamb and has a central tower with a spire. The stained glass east window was donated by Sir Robert Frankland-Russell. The north window was commissioned by Lamb and bears his initials. The west window may also be to his design.

== School ==
Kell Bank Church of England Primary School, midway between Healey and the neighbouring village of Fearby, served both villages. It was founded in 1822 by William Heslington and William Danby. In 1890 it had an attendance of 60, and still had 45 pupils in 2013, but by February 2021 the school roll had fallen to only 6 pupils and plans were announced to close it. The last pupils left in July 2021.

== See also ==
- Listed buildings in Healey, North Yorkshire
