= Christ's Hospital, Firby =

Listed building in Firby, North Yorkshire

Coordinates: 54°16′19″N 1°35′36″W

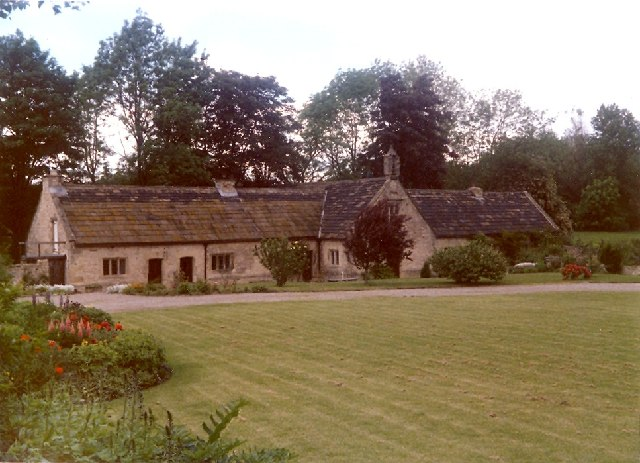
The building, in 1988

Christ's Hospital is a historic building in Firby, a village in North Yorkshire, in England.

The building was constructed in 1608 to serve as almshouses, with a central chapel. An inscription above the door commemorates the foundation. The stone slabs on the roof were partly replaced by stone slates, but the building was otherwise little altered. It was grade II listed in 1952. In the 1970s, the almshouses were converted into two houses.

The building is constructed of stone on a chamfered plinth, and has a stone slate roof with stone coping. It has seven bays with a single storey, other than the middle bay, which projects, and is gabled with two storeys. This contains a doorway with a chamfered surround and a four-centred arched lintel, over which is a cornice containing a plaque with a moulded surround and a Latin inscription. Above this is a mullioned and transomed window, and a cornice and a plaque with a moulded architrave, and on the apex of the gable is a bellcote. The outer bays contain doorways with chamfered surrounds, some with four-centred arched lintels, and the windows are chamfered with mullions. Prior to the conversion, the chapel contained a Jacobean dado, locker and hat rail, and four contemporary paintings. Each almshouse contained its original fireplace and a cupboard bed.

== See also ==
- Listed buildings in Firby, Hambleton
