= Listed buildings in Healey, North Yorkshire =

Healey is a civil parish in the county of North Yorkshire, England. It contains ten listed buildings that are recorded in the National Heritage List for England. Of these, one is listed at Grade II*, the middle of the three grades, and the others are at Grade II, the lowest grade. The parish contains the villages of Healey and Leighton and the surrounding countryside. The listed buildings consist of farmhouses, farm buildings, two mills, a boundary stone, a church and a war memorial.

== Key ==
Grade	Criteria
II*	Particularly important buildings of more than special interest
II	Buildings of national importance and special interest

== Buildings ==
Name and location	Photograph	Date	Notes	Grade
Barn south of Firs Farm; 54.22041°N 1.72656°W	—	15th century or earlier	Originally a chapel, it has been converted into a barn. It is in stone with quoins, a Welsh slate roof, and one storey. In the centre is a wagon entrance with a large lintel, and in each return is a window with a chamfered surround and a cusped arch.	II
Barn northwest of Leighton Farmhouse; 54.21096°N 1.75180°W	—	16th century	A chapel, later a barn, in stone with quoins and a Welsh slate roof. It contains a large wagon door with a segmental arch, a doorway with a stone lintel, two windows, and three chamfered slit openings.	II
Leighton Farmhouse; 54.21091°N 1.75159°W	—	1608	The farmhouse, which incorporates 16th-century fragments, is in stone on a chamfered plinth, with quoins, and a stone slate roof with a shaped kneelers and stone coping on the right. There are two storeys and three bays. The windows vary, and include mullioned windows, horizontally-sliding sashes, and later casements, and in the left return is a blocked three-light windw with elaborate tracery under a string course.	II
Healey Saw Mill; 54.21651°N 1.71711°W	—	18th century	A cotton watermill, later a sawmill, and a house at right angles, forming an L-shaped plan. The sawmill has a central range with two storeys and two bays, containing two doorways and casement and sash windows. To the left is a gabled single-storey bay containing a doorway with a segmental arch and a horizontally-sliding sash window. The house has two storeys and two bays, and a stone slate roof. It contains a doorway with a fanlight, and sash windows, one with a mullion.	II
Tranmire Stone; 54.23942°N 1.75586°W		18th century	The boundary stone is in millstone grit, about 1 metre (3 ft 3 in) high, square with a pyramidal cap, and set diagonally in a wall. On two fronts are carved pointing hands, and on the other fronts are the names of the parishes.	II
Healey Mill; 54.22109°N 1.72790°W		Late 18th to early 19th century	The buildings are in stone, and have a stone slate roof with shaped kneelers and stone coping. They consist of a house, a cornmill to the left, and a barn further to the left. The house has three storeys and two bays, a central porch and sash windows. The corn mill has three storeys and three bays, and contains a doorway in the centre of the ground and middle floors, and the windows are casements. The barn has two storeys on the right, and one on the left, and contains a wagon door with a segmental arch and a dated keystone, two doors and a window.	II
Firs Farm; 54.22062°N 1.72623°W	—	Early 19th century	The farmhouse is in stone, with two storeys and three bays. The central doorway has a chamfered surround, the windows are a mix of casements and horizontally-sliding sashes, and the roof has stone coping.	II
St Paul's Church; 54.22145°N 1.72097°W		1848	The church, designed by E. B. Lamb in Decorated style, is built in stone with Welsh slate roofs. It consists of a nave, a south porch, north and south transepts, a chancel, and a steeple at the crossing. The steeple has a tower with angle buttresses, two-light bell openings, a cornice, and a broach spire with four lucarnes. The transepts are short and flat-roofed with parapets, and each contains an oculus window.	II*
War memorial 54.21636°N 1.76269°W		1936	The memorial stands in an isolated position on the site of the first camp of the Leeds Pals (The 15th Battalion West Yorkshire Regiment) in 1914, and commemorates those who served in the regiment. It consists of a tall, broad, tapered pylon of rusticated stone blocks with a square plan. On the memorial is a rectangular bronze plaque decorated with the Yorkshire rose and the Leeds city arms, and it carries an inscription.	II
