= Gollinglith Foot =

Hamlet in North Yorkshire, England

Coordinates: 54.2244°N 1.7662°W

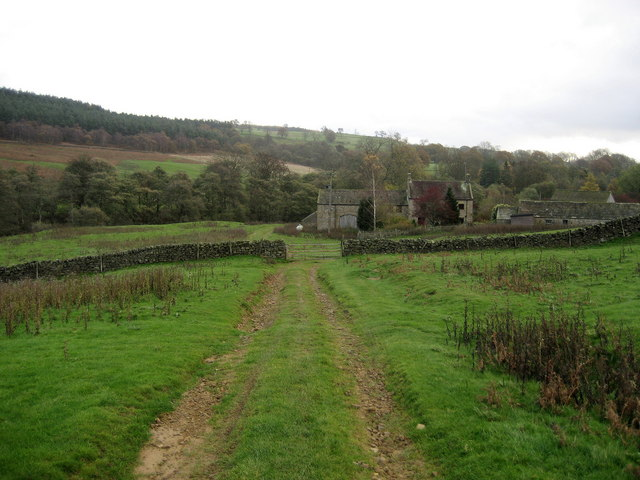
- Gollinglith Foot from the west

- Location within North Yorkshire
- OS grid reference: SE154810
- Civil parish: Healey
- Unitary authority: North Yorkshire
- Ceremonial county: North Yorkshire
- Region: Yorkshire and the Humber
- Country: England
- Sovereign state: United Kingdom
- Post town: RIPON
- Postcode district: HG4
- Police: North Yorkshire
- Fire: North Yorkshire
- Ambulance: Yorkshire

Gollinglith Foot (GOWN-li FOOT), historically also spelt Gownley Foot, is a hamlet in the civil parish of Healey in the county of North Yorkshire, England. It lies on the River Burn near the foot of Colsterdale.

It takes its name from the moorland ridge known as Gollinglith 2 miles (3 km) west of the hamlet, between the valleys of the River Burn and Spruce Gill Beck.

Gollinglith Foot was once a thriving mining community. Iron, lead and coal have all been mined from the area. It once had its own school, founded in 1787.

From 1974 to 2023 it was part of the Borough of Harrogate, it is now administered by the unitary North Yorkshire Council.

The Six Dales Trail passes through the hamlet.
