= Listed buildings in Rookwith =

Rookwith is a civil parish in the county of North Yorkshire, England. It contains two listed buildings that are recorded in the National Heritage List for England. Both the listed buildings are designated at Grade II, the lowest of the three grades, which is applied to "buildings of national importance and special interest". The parish contains the hamlet of Rookwith and the surrounding countryside. Both listed buildings are in the hamlet, and consist of a farmhouse and associated buildings.

== Buildings ==
Name and location	Photograph	Date	Notes
Smithy and wash house, Rookwith House; 54.27507°N 1.68658°W	—	18th century	The buildings are in stone with quoins and a Welsh slate roof with stone coping. There is one storey and two bays. They contain doorways and a casement window.
Rookwith House; 54.27492°N 1.68681°W		Late 18th century	A farmhouse in stone with two storeys, a main block of three bays, and a lower two-bay wing on the right. The main block has a stone slate roof with shaped kneelers and stone coping. The central doorway has Doric pilasters on plinths, partly reeded, a frieze, a cornice and a blocking course. The windows are sash windows. The wing has a pantile roof, a floor band, a casement window on the ground floor, and a horizontally sliding sash window on each floor. In the gable end are pieces of medieval window tracery.
