= Listed buildings in Laverton, North Yorkshire =

Laverton is a civil parish in the county of North Yorkshire, England. It contains four listed buildings that are recorded in the National Heritage List for England. All the listed buildings are designated at Grade II, the lowest of the three grades, which is applied to "buildings of national importance and special interest". The parish contains the village of Laverton and the surrounding countryside, and the listed buildings consist of farmhouses and a house.

== Buildings ==
Name and location	Photograph	Date	Notes
Bowes Farmhouse; 54.13947°N 1.69441°W	—	Late 18th century	The farmhouse is in stone, with quoins, and a Welsh slate roof with stone coping. There are two storeys and two bays. On the front is a doorway, and to its right is a casement window. The other windows are horizontally-sliding sashes.
The Grange; 54.15712°N 1.70534°W	—	1793	The farmhouse is in stone, with quoins, and a stone slate roof with stone coping on the left. There are two storeys, a main block with two bays, and to the left is a lower single-bay extension. The central doorway has a plain surround, and above it is a dated and inscribed tablet. The windows in the main block are sashes, some horizontally-sliding, and in the extension they are casements.
Azerley Grange; 54.14544°N 1.67538°W	—	1801	The farmhouse is in stone, with quoins, and a stone slate roof with stone copings and plain kneelers. There are two storeys and three bays, and the gable end faces the road. The central doorway has a plain surround, and a dated and initialled pedimented hood on brackets. Above the doorway is a blind window, and the other windows are sashes with plain surrounds.
Laverton Grange; 54.15610°N 1.65332°W	—	Early 19th century	The house is in stone on a plinth, with oversailing eaves and a hipped Welsh slate roof. There are two storeys, three bays, the middle bay recessed, and a single-storey wing on the right. Steps lead up to the doorway, that has Doric pilasters, a fanlight, a frieze, a cornice and a blocking course. The doorway is flanked by canted bay windows, each with a frieze, a cornice and a hipped roof, and the windows in the upper floor are sashes.
