= Laverton, North Yorkshire =

Village and civil parish in North Yorkshire, England

Coordinates: 54°09′N 1°39′W

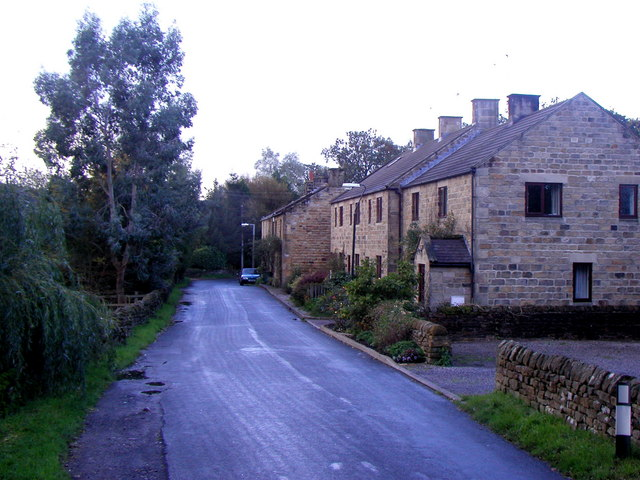
Cottages at Laverton

Laverton is a village and civil parish in the county of North Yorkshire, England, about 7 miles (11 km) west of Ripon. The population of this parish as taken at the 2011 census was 260. The River Laver, from which the settlement derives its name, flows through the village. The parish includes the area of Dallowgill west of the village of Laverton.

Historically Laverton was a township in the ancient parish of Kirkby Malzeard in the West Riding of Yorkshire. It became a separate civil parish in 1866, and was transferred from the West Riding to North Yorkshire in 1974. From 1974 to 2023 it was part of the Borough of Harrogate, it is now administered by the unitary North Yorkshire Council. The parish now shares a parish council with Kirkby Malzeard (Kirkby Malzeard, Laverton and Dallowgill Parish Council). There are also places to stay at Laverton.

== See also ==
- Listed buildings in Laverton, North Yorkshire
