= Listed buildings in Fearby =

Fearby is a civil parish in the county of North Yorkshire, England. It contains nine listed buildings that are recorded in the National Heritage List for England. All the listed buildings are designated at Grade II, the lowest of the three grades, which is applied to "buildings of national importance and special interest". The parish contains the village of Fearby and the surrounding area. All the buildings are in the village, and consist of houses, farmhouses, barns, a former market cross and a telephone kiosk

== Buildings ==
Name and location	Photograph	Date	Notes
Market cross 54.22684°N 1.69721°W		Medieval	The remains of the market cross are in stone. They consist of the base of a circular shaft set in an octagonal chamfered base.
Chapel Farmhouse; 54.22467°N 1.70432°W		1740	The house is in stone with quoins and a stone slate roof. There are two storeys and two bays. The central doorway has a moulded surround on a plinth, and a dated and initialled lintel. To its left is a two-light casement window, to the right is a three-light chamfered mullioned window, and in the upper floor are horizontally-sliding sash windows with chamfered surrounds.
Holly Tree Farmhouse; 54.22515°N 1.70471°W		1753	The house is in stone, with quoins, and a stone slate roof with shaped kneelers and stone copings. There are two storeys, three on the left, and three bays. The doorway and the windows have flat arches and voussoirs. Above the door is an inscribed datestone, and the windows are a mix of casements and sashes.
Elm Tree Farmhouse; 54.22609°N 1.70306°W		Mid to late 18th century	The farmhouse is in stone, with quoins, and a stone slate roof with shaped kneelers and stone copings. There are two storeys and three bays. The central doorway and the windows, which are horizontally-sliding sashes, have plain surrounds.
Barn west of Grange Farmhouse; 54.22660°N 1.70083°W	—	Late 18th century	The barn is in stone, with quoins, and a stone slate roof with stone coping. In the centre is a segmental-arched wagon doorway with quoins and voussoirs, flanked by slit vents.
Manor House Farmhouse; 54.22650°N 1.70171°W	—	Late 18th century	The farmhouse is in stone with quoins and a Welsh slate roof. There are two storeys, three bays and a rear outshut. The doorway and the windows, which are horizontally-sliding sashes, have plain surrounds.
Barn east of Manor House Farm; 54.22661°N 1.70163°W	—	Late 18th century	The barn is in stone, with quoins, and a stone slate roof with stone coping. In the centre is a segmental-arched wagon doorway with quoins and voussoirs, flanked by slit vents.
Manor Farmhouse; 54.22664°N 1.70121°W	—	Early 19th century	The farmhouse is in stone with quoins and a stone slate roof. There are two storeys and four bays. The doorway has a fanlight, and the windows are sashes, some of them horizontally-sliding.
Telephone kiosk 54.22493°N 1.70390°W		1935	The K6 type telephone kiosk was designed by Giles Gilbert Scott. Constructed in cast iron with a square plan and a dome, it has three unperforated crowns in the top panels.
