= Rookwith =

Hamlet and civil parish in North Yorkshire, England

Coordinates: 54.2737°N 1.68605°W

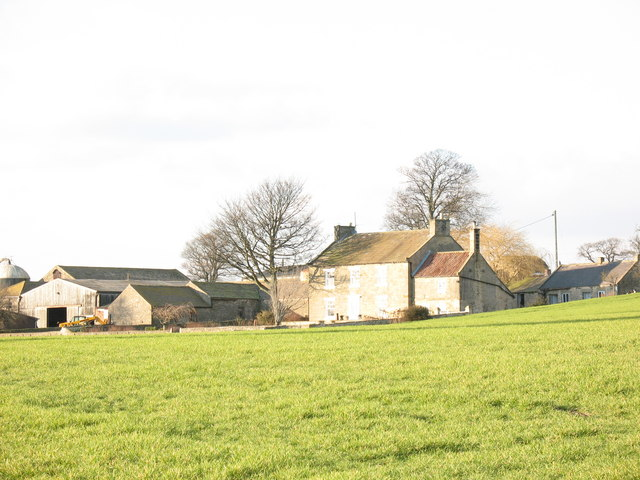
- Farm in Rookwith

- Location within North Yorkshire
- OS grid reference: SE205864
- Unitary authority: North Yorkshire
- Ceremonial county: North Yorkshire
- Region: Yorkshire and the Humber
- Country: England
- Sovereign state: United Kingdom
- Post town: Ripon
- Postcode district: HG4
- Police: North Yorkshire
- Fire: North Yorkshire
- Ambulance: Yorkshire

Rookwith is a hamlet and civil parish in the county of North Yorkshire, England, about 4 miles (6.4 km) west of Bedale and near the flow of the River Ure. The hamlet was mentioned in the Domesday Book as belonging to Count Alan and having four ploughlands.

The population at the 2011 Census was less than 100. Details are included in the civil parish of Thirn. The population in 2015 was estimated to be 20.

From 1974 to 2023 it was part of the Hambleton District, it is now administered by the unitary North Yorkshire Council.

The name Rookwith derives from the Old Norse hrókrviðr meaning 'rook tree/wood'.

== See also ==
- Listed buildings in Rookwith
