= St Paul's Church, Healey =

Church in Healey, North Yorkshire, England

Coordinates: 54°13′17″N 1°43′15″W

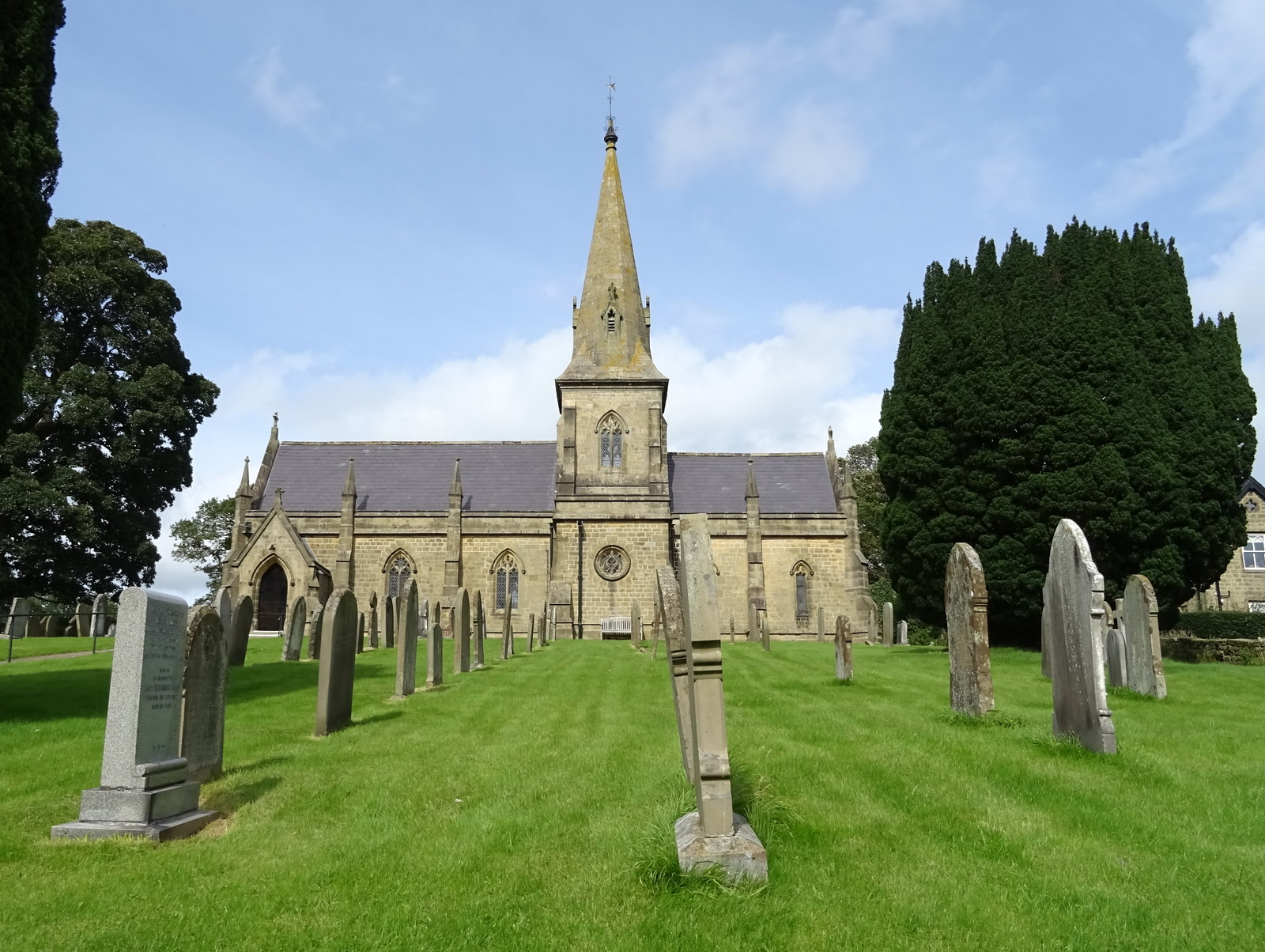
The church, in 2020

St Paul's Church is the parish church of Healey, North Yorkshire, a village in England.

The church was designed by E. B. Lamb in Decorated style, and was completed in 1848. A local legend claims that funding for the construction came from the winnings of the local horse Ellington, but this is impossible as Ellington only raced in 1855 and 1856. The church was grade II* listed in 1966.

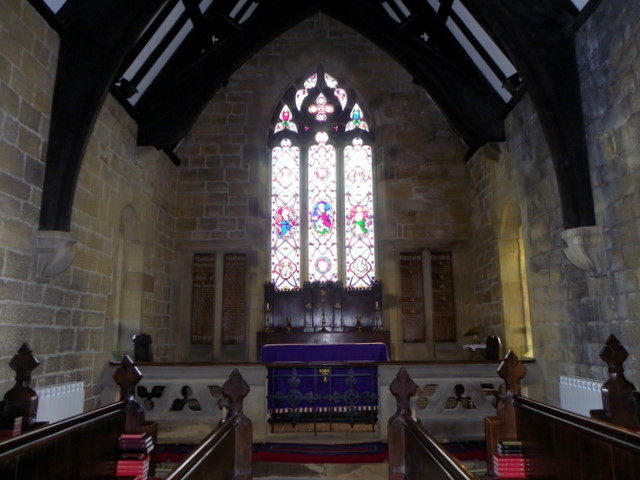
View from the nave into the chancel

The church is built of stone with Welsh slate roofs. It consists of a nave, a south porch, north and south transepts, a chancel, and a steeple at the crossing. The steeple has a tower with angle buttresses, two-light bell openings, a cornice, and a broach spire with four lucarnes. The transepts are short and flat-roofed with parapets, and each contains an oculus window. Inside, the crossing is of unusual construction, with four narrow arches, with heavy squinches in the corners supporting the tower. It is described by Nikolaus Pevsner as "the real Lamb Grand Slam". The stone altar rail with iron gates, wooden pews and choir stalls, pulpit and font are all designed by Lamb, as are the north and west stained glass windows. The east window was designed by Robert Frankland-Russell.

== See also ==
- Grade II* listed churches in North Yorkshire (district)
- Listed buildings in Healey, North Yorkshire
