= Afon Llafar =

River in Snowdonia, Wales

Coordinates: 53.1750°N 4.0583°W

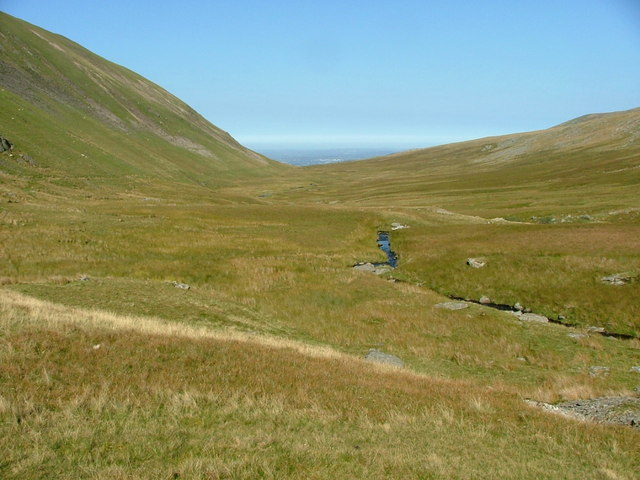
Afon Llafar, 4 km from Pont Pen-y-Benglog, Conwy, Wales

Afon Llafar is a river in the Carneddau, Snowdonia. It rises where many streams flow down the slopes of Yr Elen, Carnedd Llewelyn and Carnedd Dafydd to join together in the valley below the cliffs of Ysgolion Duon ("Black Ladders"). It is one of several similarly named streams in Wales. The river flows north-west along Cwm Pen-llafar, with Caseg River joining it near Gerlan, and discharges into the River Ogwen in the heart of Bethesda. Afon Llafar has the same etymology as the River Laver in North Yorkshire, England, with both being derived from Brittonic laβar, meaning "talkative, boastful" (Welsh llafar, "loud, noisy").
