= Martha Hatfield =

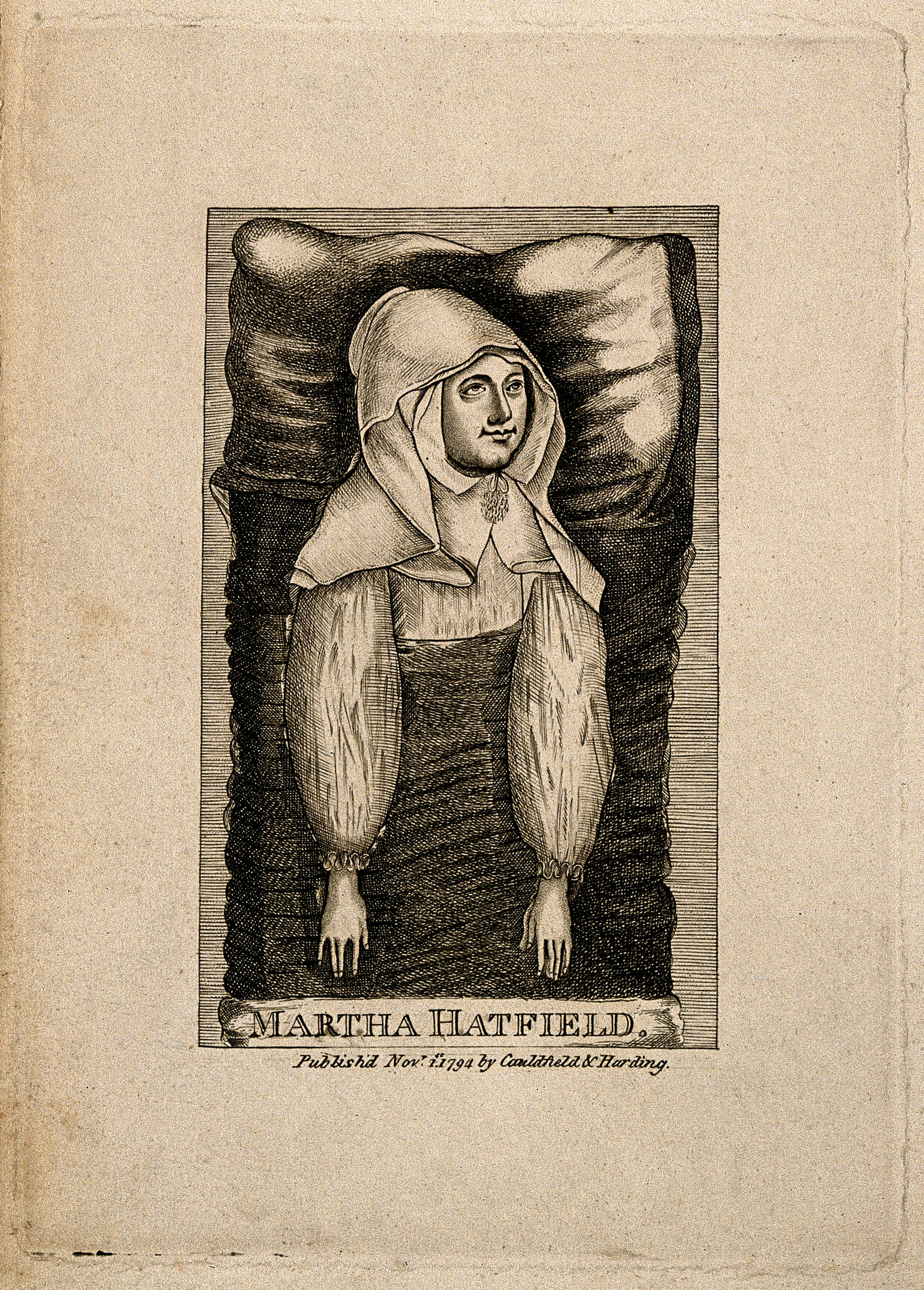
- Years active: 1652
- Known for: Religious prophet

Martha Hatfield (or Hatfeild; born 27 September 1640), also known as The Wise Virgin, was an English Puritan prophet.

Hatfield was born in Leighton, North Yorkshire, England in the 17th century, daughter of Anthony Hatfield (1598-1655/6; the family name is more commonly encountered as "Hatfeild"), of Laughton-en-le-Morthen, near Rotherham, and Faith (d. 1659), daughter of George Westby, of Gilthwaite, Rotherham. The Hatfield family were Yorkshire gentry, originally of Ecclesfield, coming to own the manor of Thorp Arch in the eighteenth century through marriage with the Gossip family of that place.

In April 1652, Hatfield became ill with a type of catalepsy. She became paralyzed, blind, deaf and mute. This lasted for seventeen days. When she recovered she began "rambling" about religious subjects and started quoting scriptures. What she said was documented by John and Peter, the sons of Edward Rodes, and another man named John Cromwell. On 8 September 1652 she became mute again. She remained mute until 7 December 1652. However, her second recovery did not have any prophetic moments.

In 1653, her uncle, James Fisher, who founded the first Presbyterian church in Sheffield, England, wrote a book about Hatfield and her prophetic dialogue called The Wise Virgin. The book was a best seller and was reprinted multiple times.
