= Listed buildings in Firby, Bedale =

Firby is a civil parish in the county of North Yorkshire, England. It contains four listed buildings that are recorded in the National Heritage List for England. All the listed buildings are designated at Grade II, the lowest of the three grades, which is applied to "buildings of national importance and special interest". The parish contains the village of Firby and the surrounding countryside. The listed buildings consist of two houses, a milestone and former almshouses.

== Buildings ==
Name and location	Photograph	Date	Notes
Christ's Hospital Almshouses; 54.27194°N 1.59333°W		1602	The almshouses were converted into two houses in the about the 1970s. They are in stone on a chamfered plinth, and have a stone slate roof with stone coping. There are seven bays with a single storey, other than the middle bay, which projects, and is gabled with two storeys. This contains a doorway with a chamfered surround and a four-centred arched lintel, over which is a cornice containing a plaque with a moulded surround and a Latin inscription. Above this is a mullioned and transomed window, and a cornice and a plaque with a moulded architrave, and on the apex of the gable is a bellcote. The outer bays contain doorways with chamfered surrounds, some with four-centred arched lintels, and the windows are chamfered with mullions.
Milestone; 54.27281°N 1.61098°W		1712	The milestone is on the left side of Masham Road (B6268 road). It is in limestone and consists of a square pillar about 1 metre (3 ft 3 in) high on a plinth. The milestone is inscribed with the date, and on all four sides with the names of destinations.
Ashla Cottage; 54.27274°N 1.59111°W	—	Mid 18th century	The house is in stone with a pantile roof. There are two storeys and four bays. In the front is a doorway with a flush surround, above which is a sundial. The windows are sashes, those in the upper floor horizontally-sliding. All the openings have flat brick arches.
Firby Hall; 54.27307°N 1.59252°W		Late 18th century	The house, which was extended in the 19th century, is in rendered stone, with a hipped stone slate roof and oversailing eaves. There are two storeys with a main front of six bays, three of them with three storeys and canted. The right return has two bays, and contains a doorway with pilasters, a fanlight and an open pediment. The windows are sashes with stone sills.
