= Listed buildings in Ellington High and Low =

Ellington High and Low is a civil parish in the county of North Yorkshire, England. It contains three listed buildings that are recorded in the National Heritage List for England. All the listed buildings are designated at Grade II, the lowest of the three grades, which is applied to "buildings of national importance and special interest". The parish contains the villages of High Ellington and Low Ellington and the surrounding countryside, and the listed buildings consist of two farmhouses and a school house.

== Buildings ==
Name and location	Photograph	Date	Notes
Firth Farmhouse; 54.24496°N 1.69884°W	—	Late 18th century	The farmhouse is in stone, with quoins, and a stone slate roof with stone copings and shaped kneelers. There are two storeys, three bays, and a recessed bay on the right. On the front is a doorway, and the windows are sashes, one horizontally-sliding.
Ellington Farmhouse; 54.24954°N 1.68746°W	—	Early 19th century	The farmhouse is in stone, with a floor band, and a hipped stone slate roof. There are two storeys and three bays. Steps lead up to the doorway that has an architrave, a fanlight with Gothic glazing bars, a frieze, a cornice and a blocking course. The windows are three-light chamfered mullioned sashes.
Low Ellington School House; 54.24725°N 1.69133°W		Early 19th century	The school house is in stone, it contains medieval fragments, and has a stone slate roof with stone coping. There is one storey and two bays. The central doorway has medieval fluted pilasters, and a moulded segmental arch. Flanking it are three-light chamfered mullioned windows with hood moulds, and above each is a small piece of medieval tracery.
