= Dallowgill =

Village in North Yorkshire, England

Coordinates: 54.145°N 1.716°W

- Location within North Yorkshire
- OS grid reference: SE185725
- Civil parish: Laverton
- Unitary authority: North Yorkshire
- Ceremonial county: North Yorkshire
- Region: Yorkshire and the Humber
- Country: England
- Sovereign state: United Kingdom
- Post town: RIPON
- Postcode district: HG4
- Police: North Yorkshire
- Fire: North Yorkshire
- Ambulance: Yorkshire

Dallowgill (historically also Dallaghill) is a village in the county of North Yorkshire, England. It consists of a number of scattered settlements in the western part of the civil parish of Laverton.

== History ==
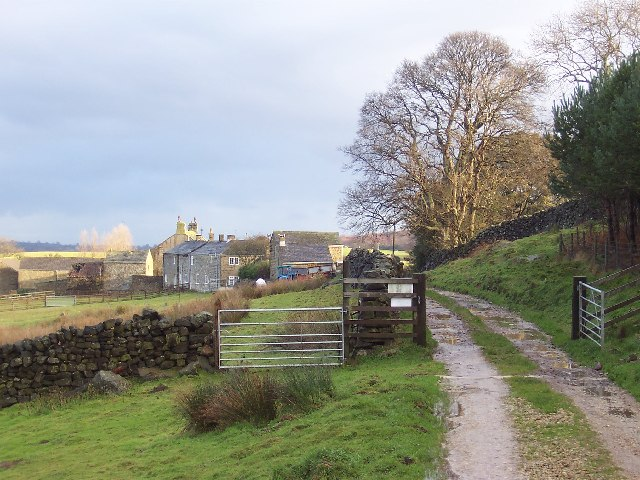
Dallow hamlet

Dallowgill takes its name from Dallow, now a small settlement in the south of the area. Dallow is derived from dael haga, meaning "enclosure in the dale". "Dallowgill" was originally applied to the ravine or gill of the River Laver below Dallow.

Historically Dallowgill was part of the ancient parish of Kirkby Malzeard in the West Riding of Yorkshire. It became a separate parish in 1844. When civil parishes were created in 1866 it became part of the civil parish of Laverton, which now shares a parish council with Kirkby Malzeard (Kirkby Malzeard, Laverton and Dallowgill Parish Council). Dallowgill remains a separate ecclesiastical parish, now part of the benefice of the Fountains Group of parishes.

From 1974 to 2023 it was part of the Borough of Harrogate, it is now administered by the unitary North Yorkshire Council.

== Buildings and structures ==
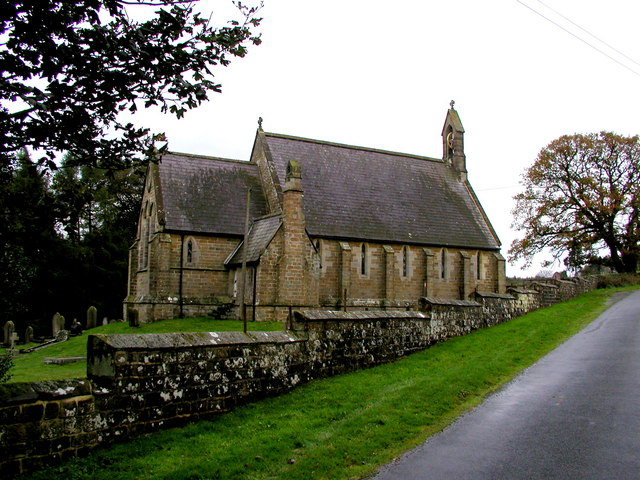
St Peter's church

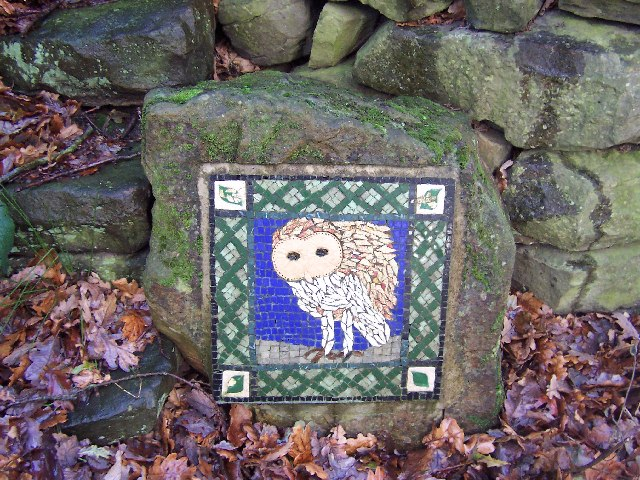
One of the Crackpots Mosaics near Stang Brae

The parish church of St Peter was built in 1842. It closed in 2011. There is also a Methodist chapel.

The Greygarth Monument commemorates Queen Victoria's Diamond Jubilee in 1897. At Carlesmoor in the north of the parish there is a sighting tower.

Dotted around Dallowgill are 22 mosaic panels depicting local scenes and wildlife. They were created and positioned in 1997 by local artists calling themselves the Crackpots.
