= Listed buildings in Ilton-cum-Pott =

Ilton-cum-Pott is a civil parish in the county of North Yorkshire, England. It contains seven listed buildings that are recorded in the National Heritage List for England. All the listed buildings are designated at Grade II, the lowest of the three grades, which is applied to "buildings of national importance and special interest". The parish contains the village of Ilton and the surrounding countryside and moorland. All the listed buildings are outside the village, and consist of a house, a farmhouse and farm buildings, two follies, a seat and a tower.

== Buildings ==
Name and location	Photograph	Date	Notes
Lobley Hall; 54.20870°N 1.70929°W		Late 17th century	A stone house in ruins, with a moulded cornice. There are two storeys and three bays. The central doorway has a moulded surround, and the windows, which are mullioned, have moulded surrounds and chamfered sills.
Roundhill Farmhouse and farm buildings 54.18565°N 1.77369°W		1773	A farmhouse with farm buildings, largely in ruins, in stone with Welsh slate roofs. The house has quoins and two storeys, and contains doorways and windows. The barn to the west contains a segmental-headed cart entrance with a dated keystone, and further to the west are single-storey farm buildings in three ranges round a courtyard. To the south is a two-storey building with quoins and a hipped roof.
Stable with hay loft and pigeoncote north of Roundhill Farmhouse; 54.18590°N 1.77375°W		Late 18th century	The stable, hayloft and pigeoncote are in stone, with quoins, a stone slate roof, and two storeys. In the south gable are triangular flight holes and perches. In the middle of the east front is a stable door, and to its left is an external stairway leading to a loft door.
Druids' Temple; 54.20389°N 1.73379°W		c. 1800	A folly in sandstone intended to resemble a druids' temple. There are two circles, within which are an antechamber, a circular chamber containing a sacrificial stone, and a tomb. On the hill above is a tall column of stones symbolising a deity and the twelve signs of the zodiac.
Arnagill Tower; 54.17717°N 1.76798°W		1824	A folly in the form of a round tower. It has one storey, and contains a doorway and three windows, all arched.
Seat at Quarry Gill Bridge; 54.21508°N 1.69988°W		1832	This consists of a semicircular-arched apsidal structure in stone. Inside there is an inscription and the date.
Sighting tower 54.18852°N 1.75770°W		1903	The tower was built for surveying, it is in stone, and about 14 metres (46 ft) high. The tower consists of two T-shaped buttressed piers, with T-shaped heads forming a sill around the head of the tower.
