= Ellingstring =

Village and civil parish in North Yorkshire, England

Coordinates: 54.2445°N 1.7292°W

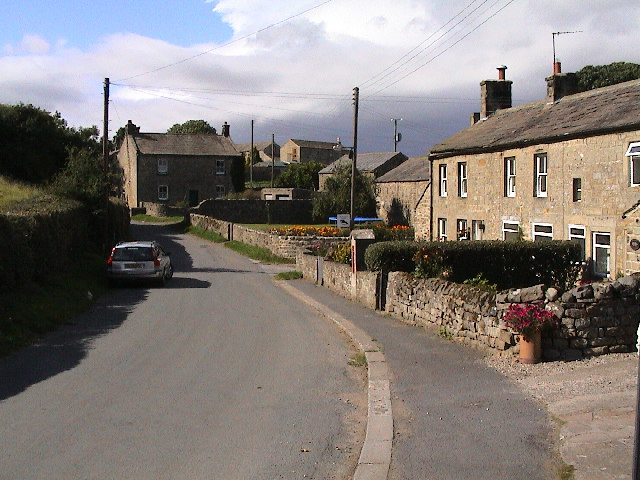
- Ellingstring village

- Location within North Yorkshire
- Population: 80
- OS grid reference: SE177832
- Unitary authority: North Yorkshire
- Ceremonial county: North Yorkshire
- Region: Yorkshire and the Humber
- Country: England
- Sovereign state: United Kingdom
- Post town: RIPON
- Postcode district: HG4
- Dialling code: 01677
- Police: North Yorkshire
- Fire: North Yorkshire
- Ambulance: Yorkshire
- UK Parliament: Skipton and Ripon

Ellingstring is a village and civil parish in Wensleydale in North Yorkshire, England, about 5 miles (8 km) south-east of Leyburn, and 3.5 miles (5.6 km) north of Masham. Historically it was in the wapentake of Hang East. From 1974 to 2023 it was part of the Borough of Harrogate, it is now administered by the unitary North Yorkshire Council.

The population of the parish was estimated at 80 in 2012.

The parish now shares a grouped parish council, known as Fearby, Healey and District Parish Council, with Colsterdale, Fearby, Healey and Ilton cum Pott. It falls within the Skipton and Ripon constituency for the UK Parliament. The name of the village was first recorded in 1198 as Elingstrengge, and derives from the Old English Ella and the Old Norse strengr, meaning watercourse.
