= Ellington Airport =

Ellington Airport may refer to:

- Ellington Airport (Connecticut), an airport in Ellington, Connecticut, United States (FAA: 7B9)
- Ellington Airport (Tennessee), an airport in Lewisburg, Tennessee, United States (FAA: LUG)
- Ellington Airport (Texas), an airport in Houston, Texas, United States (FAA/IATA: EFD)
