= Ellington Electronics Technology Group =

- Type: Public
- Traded as: SSE: 603328
- Industry: Electronics
- Founded: 2000; 26 years ago, Hong Kong
- Headquarters: Zhongshan City, Guangdong Province, China
- Key people: Wayne Lee, Vincent Lee, Tommy Lee
- Products: Printed circuit boards
- Revenue: $487 million USD (FY 2017); $508 million USD (FY 2018); $494 million USD (FY 2019)
- Number of employees: 6,500+ (Q3 2019)
- Website: www.ellingtonpcb.com

Ellington Electronics Technology Group (Chinese: 依頓電子科技股份有限公司; simply known as Ellington PCB or Eton) is one of the leading printed circuit board (PCB) manufacturers in China. It is a Hong Kong–based company which is listed on the Shanghai Stock Exchange on 1 July 2014. In Year 2018, the company was ranked Top 10 in China and 41st in the world by revenue.

== History ==
Ellington was founded in March 2000, principally engaged in the manufacture and sale of high precision and density 2/L to 20/L printed circuit board. With in-house surface finishing of Organic Solderability Preservative (OSP), Lead-Free Hot Air Solder Leveling (HASL), Immersion Gold / Silver / Tin. It manufactures for over 400 customers worldwide. Ellington's world ranking jumped from 88th in 2005 to 41st in 2018.

== Operations ==
The company's headquarter and production facilities are located in Zhongshan City, Guangdong Province, China. The 4-storey manufacturing plant has a total area of 2,600,000 sq ft. Ellington focusing on production quality management and control, with the mission of "Quality Is Life", the company is ISO/TS16949, ISO 9002, ISO 14001 and OHSAS 18001 certified. After the completion of its 3rd stage capacity expansion, the company currently generates an output of 4,200,000 sq ft (390,600 m^{2}) per month and currently employs more than 6,500 people.

Ellington also has a logistic facility and administration office located in Tsuen Wan, Hong Kong.

The company produces multilayered rigid PCBs that are used in various electronic equipment worldwide including consumer electronics, telecommunication, computer and Computer Peripherals, automotive industry, automation, power supply and electronic test equipment.

== Future ==
Ellington has completed the 4th Stage of capacity expansion, generating a further 500,000 sq ft capacity for Automotive Industry only in an isolated production plant. A total production output of 7,000,000 sq ft multilayer PCB will be generated by the 5th Stage of capacity expansion plan after listing on Shanghai Stock Exchange.

== Major Customer Base ==
Apple, Bose Corporation, Continental AG, Delphi Technologies, Flextronics, Huawei, Jabil Circuit, Lite-On, Preh, Robert Bosch GmbH, Wistron Corporation, Valeo and 200+ others.
