= Fearby =

Village and civil parish in North Yorkshire, England

Coordinates: 54.225°N 1.7°W

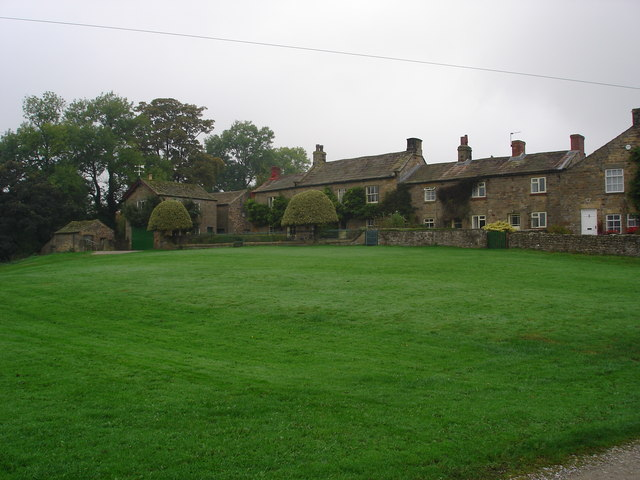
- Cottages overlooking the village green at Fearby

- Location within North Yorkshire
- Population: 130
- OS grid reference: SE195812
- Civil parish: Fearby
- Unitary authority: North Yorkshire
- Ceremonial county: North Yorkshire
- Region: Yorkshire and the Humber
- Country: England
- Sovereign state: United Kingdom
- Post town: RIPON
- Postcode district: HG4
- Dialling code: 01765
- Police: North Yorkshire
- Fire: North Yorkshire
- Ambulance: Yorkshire
- UK Parliament: Skipton and Ripon

Fearby is a village and civil parish in North Yorkshire, England. It is located in the valley of the River Burn 2 miles (3 km) west of Masham. Nearby settlements include Healey, High Ellington and Swinton. The population of the parish was estimated at 130 in 2013.

== History ==
The village is first mentioned, as Federbi, in the Domesday Book which records a population of eight villagers and one smallholder. The toponym is of uncertain derivation. The element -by is of Old Norse origin, meaning "village", and the name could mean either "four villages" or "feather village".

Fearby was historically a township in the large ancient parish of Masham in the North Riding of Yorkshire. It became part of the new ecclesiastical parish of Healey in 1849. The civil parish of Fearby was formed in 1866.

== Governance ==
Until 1974 Fearby was part of Masham Rural District (before 1934 Masham Urban District) in the North Riding of Yorkshire. From 1974 to 2023 it was part of the Borough of Harrogate, it is now administered by the unitary North Yorkshire Council. It lies within the Nidderdale Area of Outstanding Natural Beauty.

The parish now shares a grouped parish council, known as Fearby, Healey and District Parish Council, with Colsterdale, Ellingstring, Healey and Ilton cum Pott.

== See also ==
- Listed buildings in Fearby
