= Rand Grange =

Civil parish in North Yorkshire, England

Coordinates: 54.295°N 1.608°W

- Civil parish

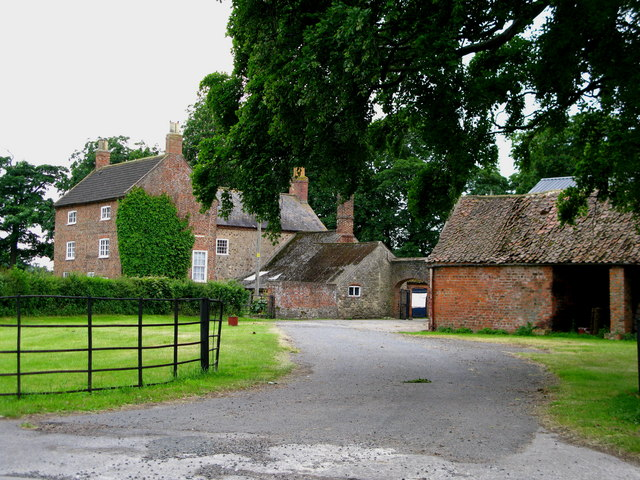
- Population: 10
- OS grid reference: SE255889
- Civil parish: Rand Grange
- Unitary authority: North Yorkshire
- Ceremonial county: North Yorkshire
- Region: Yorkshire and the Humber
- Country: England
- Sovereign state: United Kingdom
- Post town: BEDALE
- Postcode district: DL8
- Police: North Yorkshire
- Fire: North Yorkshire
- Ambulance: Yorkshire
- UK Parliament: Thirsk and Malton

Rand Grange is a civil parish in the county of North Yorkshire, England. It is a very small parish, consisting of a single farmhouse and surrounding fields and woodland, less than a mile north of the town of Bedale. Its total area is 359 acres (145 ha), and the population was estimated at 10 in 2015.

From 1974 to 2023 it was part of the Hambleton District, it is now administered by the unitary North Yorkshire Council.

The farmhouse is a Grade II listed building, dating from the early 19th century.
