= Thirn =

Village and civil parish in North Yorkshire, England

Coordinates: 54.2685°N 1.66756°W

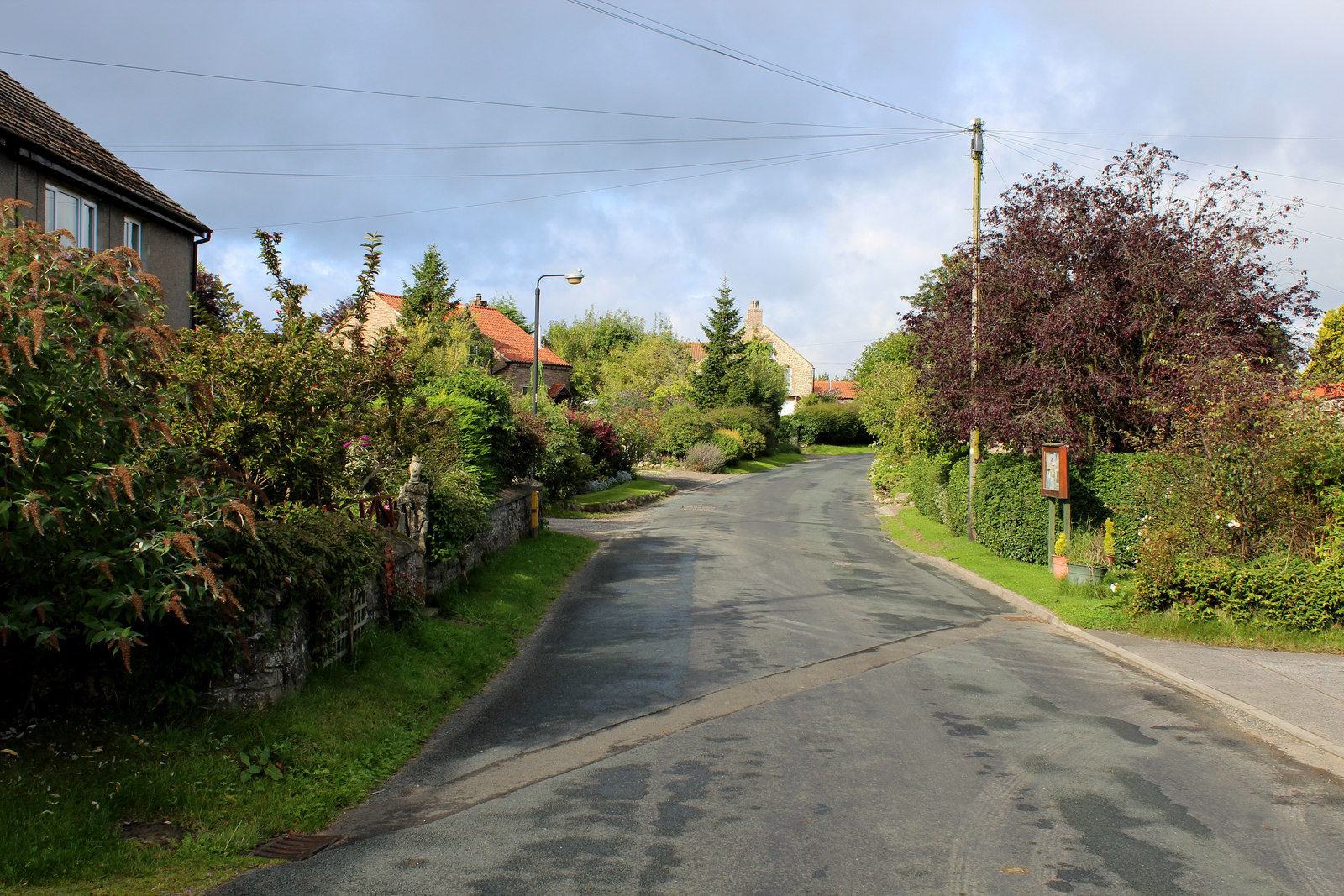
- Village street

- Location within North Yorkshire
- Population: 144 (Including Clifton-on-Yore and Rookwith. 2011 census)
- OS grid reference: SE217859
- Unitary authority: North Yorkshire
- Ceremonial county: North Yorkshire
- Region: Yorkshire and the Humber
- Country: England
- Sovereign state: United Kingdom
- Post town: Ripon
- Postcode district: HG4
- Dialling code: 01677
- Police: North Yorkshire
- Fire: North Yorkshire
- Ambulance: Yorkshire

Thirn is a village and civil parish in North Yorkshire, England. It is situated close to the River Ure, about 3 miles (5 km) south-west of Bedale.

The hamlet of Thirn is mentioned in the Domesday Book, and the name derives from the Old English þyrne, meaning thorn-bush. Historically the hamlet was in the ecclesiastical parish of Thornton Watlass, in the wapentake of Hang East.

From 1974 to 2023 it was part of the Hambleton District, it is now administered by the unitary North Yorkshire Council.

There is a former Wesleyan Chapel which is located on the road to Thornton Watlass, and a former public house (The Boot & Shoe).
