= William Danby (writer) =

English writer

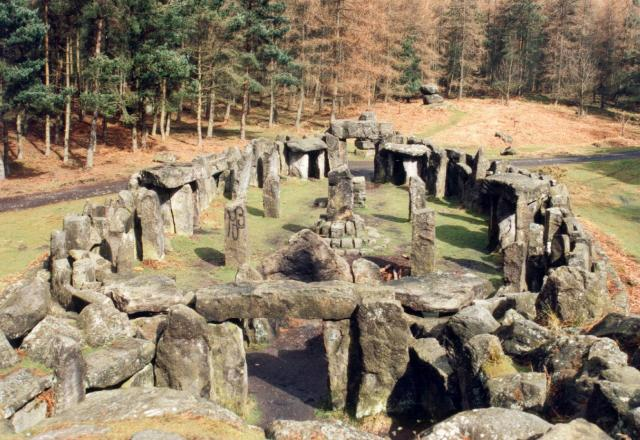
Danby's "Druid's temple "

William Danby (1752 – 4 December 1833) was an English writer who rebuilt his family home of Swinton Park, near Masham in the North Riding of Yorkshire (now in North Yorkshire), in Gothick taste and recreated Stonehenge on his estate, as the "Druids' Temple". His house is now a hotel and his Stonehenge a picnickers' spot on nearby Forestry Commission land at Ilton.

Danby was the only son of the Reverend William Danby DD (1712-1781) of Swinton Park, and Mary, daughter of Gilbert Affleck of Dalham, Suffolk. From 1763 to 1770 he had a private tutor at Eton College. On 24 October 1770 he was admitted as a fellow-commoner to Christ's College, Cambridge. In 1784 he served the office of High Sheriff of Yorkshire. He was twice married: first in 1775 to Caroline (d. 1821), daughter of Henry Seymour, and second on 5 January 1822 to Anne Holwell, second daughter of William Gater.

Danby almost entirely rebuilt his country house at Swinton, from designs by John Carr and local builder-architects, with some interior design contributed by James Wyatt. It included a handsome library and a richly furnished museum of minerals. Describing a tour which he made in 1829, the poet Robert Southey remarked, "The most interesting person whom I saw during this expedition was Mr. Danby of Swinton Park, a man of very large fortune, and now very old."

Danby was an accomplished scholar and wrote some works of personal philosophy that include: Thoughts, Chiefly on Serious Subjects (1821), Ideas and Realities, or, Thoughts on Various Subjects (1827), Extracts from and observations on Cicero's dialogues De senectute and De amicitia, and a translation of his Somnium Scipionis, with notes (1829), and Thoughts on Various Subjects (1831). Danby died at Swinton Park on 4 December 1833. He left no children.

He was elected as a Vice-President of the Yorkshire Philosophical Society in 1824.
