= Colsterdale =

Valley in North Yorkshire, England

Coordinates: 54.227500°N 1.802100°W

- Location within North Yorkshire
- OS grid reference: SE130813
- Civil parish: Colsterdale
- Unitary authority: North Yorkshire
- Ceremonial county: North Yorkshire
- Region: Yorkshire and the Humber
- Country: England
- Sovereign state: United Kingdom
- Post town: RIPON
- Postcode district: HG4
- Police: North Yorkshire
- Fire: North Yorkshire
- Ambulance: Yorkshire

Colsterdale is the valley of the River Burn, a tributary of the River Ure, in the Yorkshire Dales in North Yorkshire, England. It gives its name to a hamlet and civil parish in the upper part of the dale, about 7 miles (11 km) west of Masham. The population of the civil parish was estimated at 20 in 2010. The lower part of the dale around the hamlet of Gollinglith Foot is in the civil parish of Healey. From 1974 to 2023 it was part of the Borough of Harrogate. It is now administered by the unitary North Yorkshire Council.

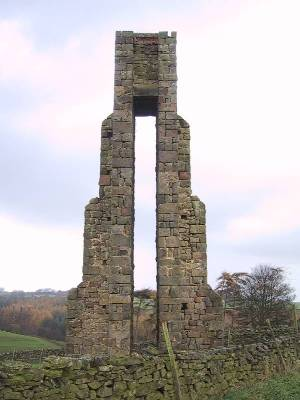
One of the Colsterdale towers

Although Colsterdale is not in Nidderdale, it lies within the Nidderdale National Landscape.

Colsterdale is part of the privately owned Swinton Estate.

The Colsterdale towers are towers built between 1895 and 1911 to conduct surveys.

== History ==
The name, first recorded in 1281, means "coalman valley". There was a coal mine here in the 14th century.

Colsterdale was historically divided between the parishes of East Witton and Masham in the North Riding of Yorkshire. The upper part of the inhabited dale, above Gollinglith Foot, was a detached part of the parish of East Witton (from 1866 a detached part of the civil parish of East Witton Without), but in 1886 was transferred to the civil parish of Healey with Sutton, and in 1894 was created a separate civil parish. In 1934 2,915 acres (1,180 ha) of the uninhabited Masham Moor (including the uninhabited part of Colsterdale), an area common to the parishes of Masham and East Witton, was added to the civil parish of Colsterdale. The lower part of the dale became part of the civil parish of Healey with Sutton (known as Healey from 1934) in 1866.

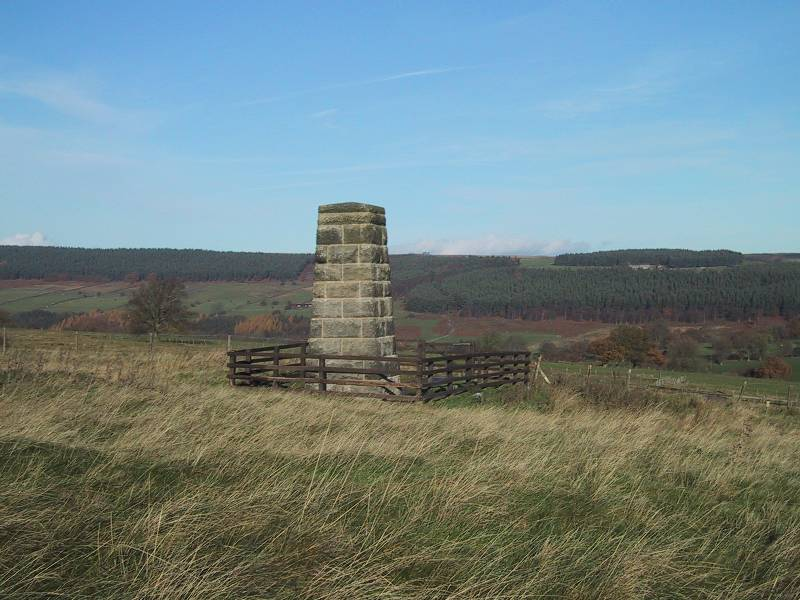
Leeds Pals Memorial

During the First World War Colsterdale was the site of a training camp for the Leeds Pals. There is now a memorial to the Leeds Pals in the dale, erected in 1935. The camp later became a Prisoner of War camp for German Officers.

The parish now shares a grouped parish council, known as Fearby, Healey and District Parish Council, with Ellingstring, Fearby, Healey and Ilton cum Pott.
