= Firby, Bedale =

Village and civil parish in North Yorkshire, England

Coordinates: 54°16′23″N 1°35′24″W

Firby
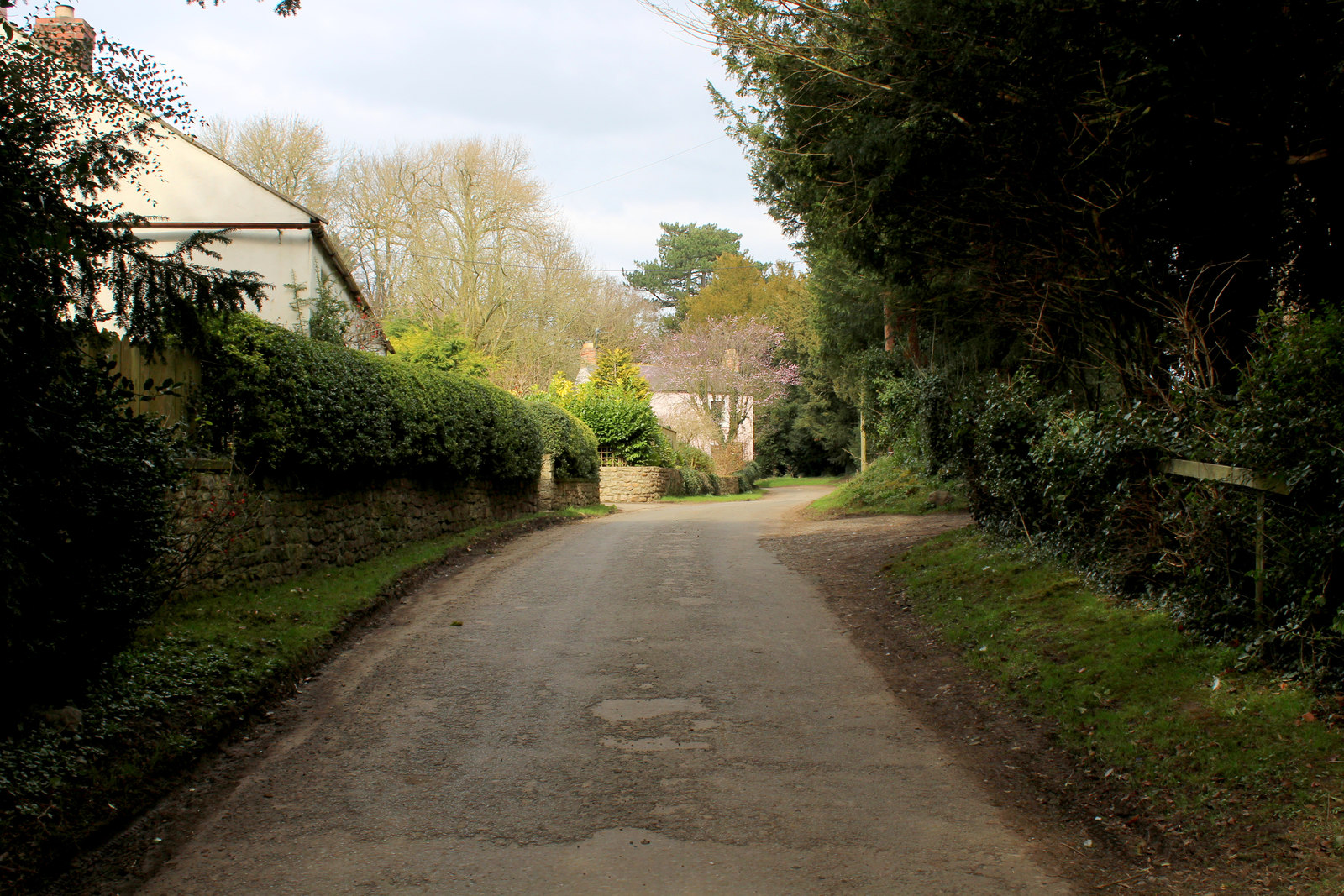
- Road into Firby

- Location within North Yorkshire
- Population: 30
- OS grid reference: SE268865
- Civil parish: Firby
- Unitary authority: North Yorkshire
- Ceremonial county: North Yorkshire
- Region: Yorkshire and the Humber
- Country: England
- Sovereign state: United Kingdom
- Post town: Bedale
- Postcode district: DL8
- Police: North Yorkshire
- Fire: North Yorkshire
- Ambulance: Yorkshire
- UK Parliament: Thirsk and Malton

Firby is a small village and civil parish in North Yorkshire, England. It lies 1-mile (1.5 km) south of Bedale. The population of the parish was estimated at 30 in 2015. At the 2011 Census the population was included with the civil parish of Bedale, and not counted separately.

The manor was owned by Auduid before the Norman Conquest. By 1086, it was held by Count Alan who had many lands in the area and owned the manor of Bedale. It came to Scolland and his family who were alternately represented by sons typically named Alan FitzBryan and Bryan FitzAlan, owning the parish for over two centuries and Killerby, North Yorkshire. By the late 14th century, it was in a different family name.

Firby was a liberty of Richmondshire, and within the bounds of East Hang wapentake in the North Riding of Yorkshire. From 1974 to 2023 it was part of the Hambleton District, it is now administered by the unitary North Yorkshire Council.

The gardens at Thorp Perrow lie just to the south of the village and are in the parish of Firby. Some names of places within Firby include: Firby Hall, Firby (Christ's) Hospital, John Clapham House, Firby Grange (gifted by Scolland of Bedale to Castle Acre Priory), Low Ash Bank and High Ash Bank, Mile House Farm and Manley Farm. Christ's Hospital was founded in 1608 and was originally four almshouses. The building is now Grade II listed.

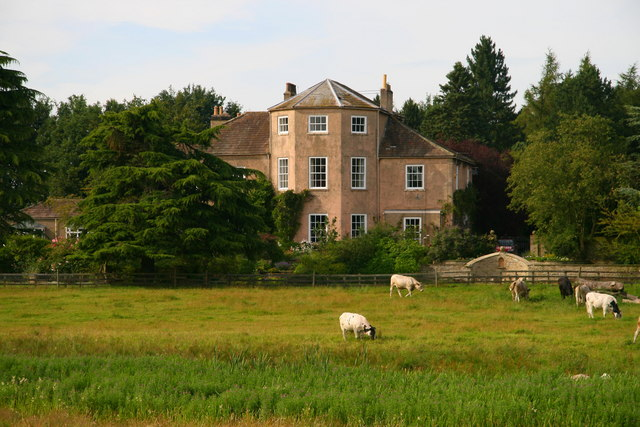
Firby Hall

Firby Hall, also Grade II listed, was built in 1788 by Colonel Thomas Coores who fought in the American War of Independence. He demolished much of the village to build the house and the 57-acre (23 ha) estate.

Firby was the origin of the surname Firby. The name of the village derives from a personal name (Frithi) and the suffix by, meaning village or farmstead.

== See also ==
- Listed buildings in Firby, Hambleton
