= Leighton, North Yorkshire =

Hamlet in North Yorkshire, England

Coordinates: 54.21082°N 1.75142°W

Leighton
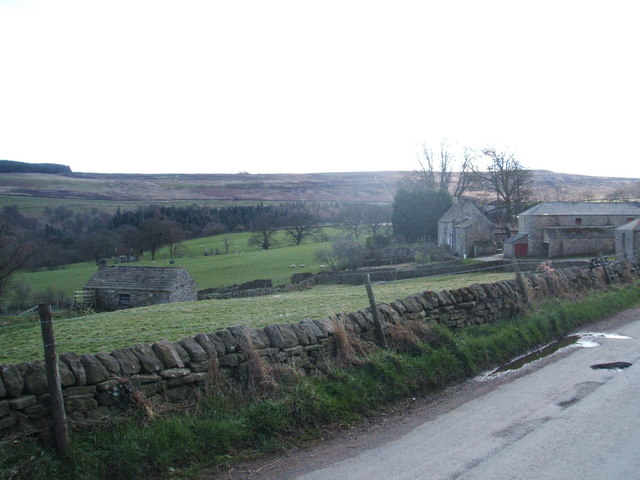
- Leighton Hall Farm

- Location within North Yorkshire
- OS grid reference: SE163794
- Civil parish: Healey
- Unitary authority: North Yorkshire
- Ceremonial county: North Yorkshire
- Region: Yorkshire and the Humber
- Country: England
- Sovereign state: United Kingdom
- Post town: RIPON
- Postcode district: HG4
- Police: North Yorkshire
- Fire: North Yorkshire
- Ambulance: Yorkshire

Leighton is a hamlet in the civil parish of Healey in the county of North Yorkshire, England. It is near Leighton Reservoir that provides for Yorkshire Water.

From 1974 to 2023 it was part of the Borough of Harrogate, it is now administered by the unitary North Yorkshire Council.

== Notable residents ==
The religious prophet Martha Hatfield was from Leighton.

== See also ==
- Listed buildings in Healey, North Yorkshire
