= Ilton-cum-Pott =

Civil parish in North Yorkshire, England

Coordinates: 54.1982°N 1.7092°W

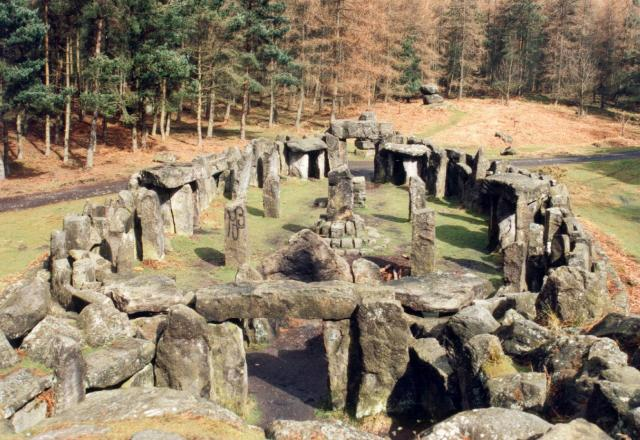
- Druids Temple

- Location within North Yorkshire
- Population: 48 (2021 census)
- Civil parish: Ilton-cum-Pott
- Unitary authority: North Yorkshire
- Ceremonial county: North Yorkshire
- Region: Yorkshire and the Humber
- Country: England
- Sovereign state: United Kingdom
- Police: North Yorkshire
- Fire: North Yorkshire
- Ambulance: Yorkshire

Ilton-cum-Pott is a civil parish in North Yorkshire, in England.

The hamlets of Ilton and Pott first became associated in the late Medieval period, when both became possessions of Fountains Abbey. Both lay within the parish of Masham, and despite the two being separated by Masham Moor, Ilton-cum-Pott became a single township. In 1866, it was made into a civil parish.

From 1894, Ilton-cum-Pott lay within Masham Urban District. This was rearranged in 1934, becoming Masham Rural District. At the same time, the part of Masham Moor between the two parts of the parish was added to it, forming for the first time one contiguous district. From 1974 to 2023 it was part of the Borough of Harrogate, it is now administered by the unitary North Yorkshire Council.

The parish's population has gradually fallen, and in 2015 was estimated at 50 people. It shares a grouped parish council, known as Fearby, Healey and District Parish Council, with Colsterdale, Ellingstring, Fearby and Healey.

== See also ==
- Listed buildings in Ilton-cum-Pott
