= Leighton Reservoir =

Reservoir in North Yorkshire, England

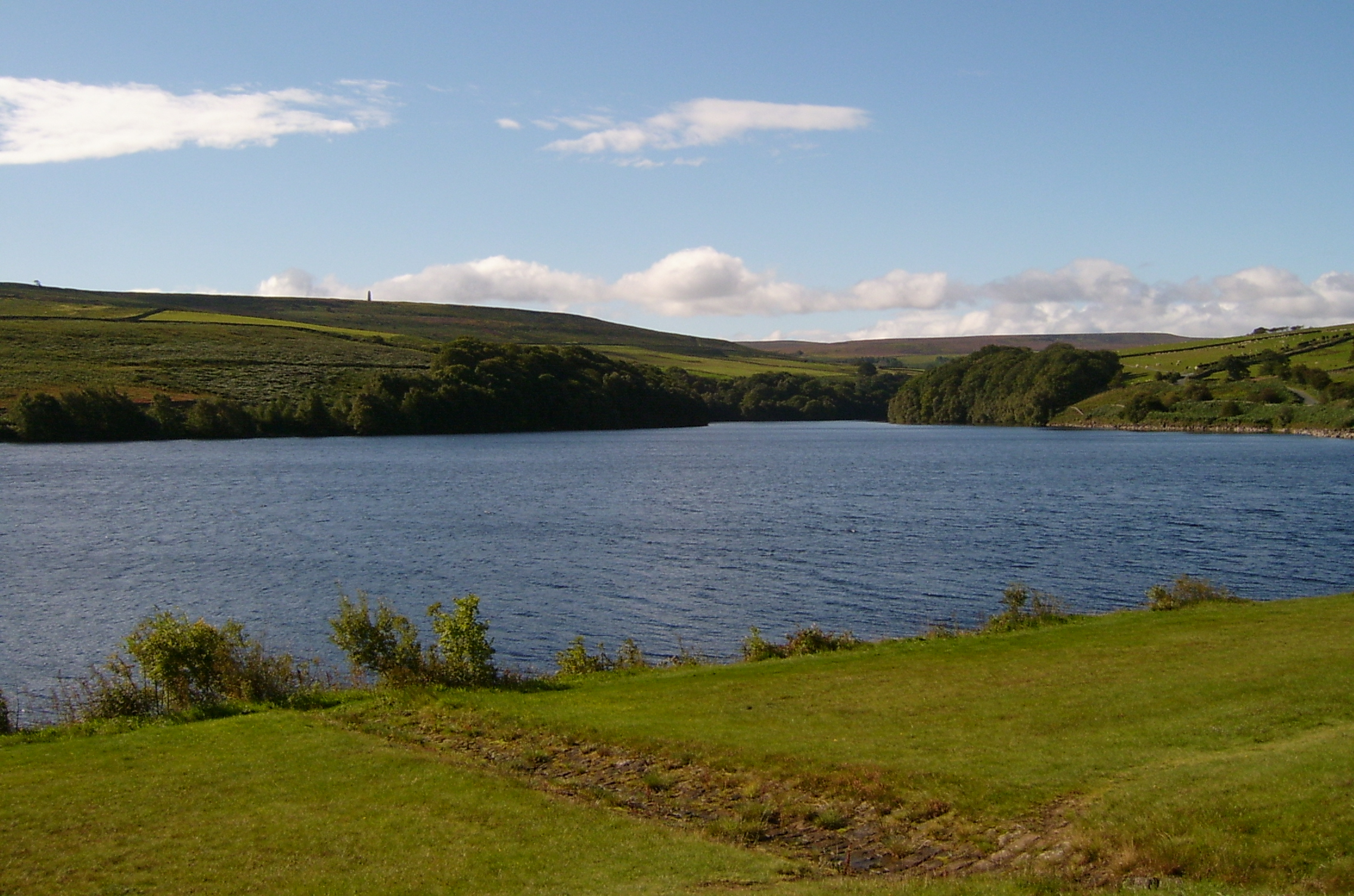

- Location within North Yorkshire
- Location: North Yorkshire
- Coordinates: 54°12′11″N 1°45′24″W
- Type: Reservoir
- Basin countries: United Kingdom
- Water volume: 5,000,000 litres (1,099,846.241 imp gal; 1,320,860.262 US gal)

Leighton Reservoir is a reservoir which drains via the River Burn to the River Ure in North Yorkshire, England. It neighbours Roundhill Reservoir and is about 4 miles (6.4 km) west of Masham. It takes its name from the nearby village of Leighton.

Work on the reservoir was started by the Leeds Corporation Waterworks in 1908, and although the major parts of the building process were over by March 1926, the final cementation was not completed until 1941. The reservoir was allowed to fill with water over the winter of 1926–1927. A newspaper report from 1910, estimated that the final cost of the construction would be £437,000 (equivalent to £44,505,000 in 2025). Although the Leeds Corporation intended to build another reservoir in Colsterdale on the River Burn, this never came to pass, and Leighton Reservoir was constructed on two tributaries of the Burn; Pott Beck and Spruce Gell.

Water from the reservoir is used to compensate for abstraction from the River Ure. Although not in Nidderdale, the reservoir is within the Nidderdale Area of Outstanding Natural Beauty.

Leighton is accessible for fishing and has a car park. The reservoir is on land owned by the Swinton Estate and they stock the waters with fish.

Like its near neighbours in Upper Nidderdale, the construction of Leighton reservoir (and Roundhill) necessitated the building of an industrial railway to bring in materials for construction. A 2 ft (610 mm) 6-mile (9.7 km) railway was built from the north end of Masham railway station where a transhipment yard was located to transfer freight between the narrow and standard gauge lines. The line opened in 1905 and was closed by 1930.

The reservoir has a mean depth of 36 feet (11.1 m), a surface area of 91 acres (37 hectares), a catchment area of 5,600 acres (2,260 hectares), and it lies at an elevation of 617 feet (188 m) above sea level.
