= River Laver =

River in North Yorkshire, England

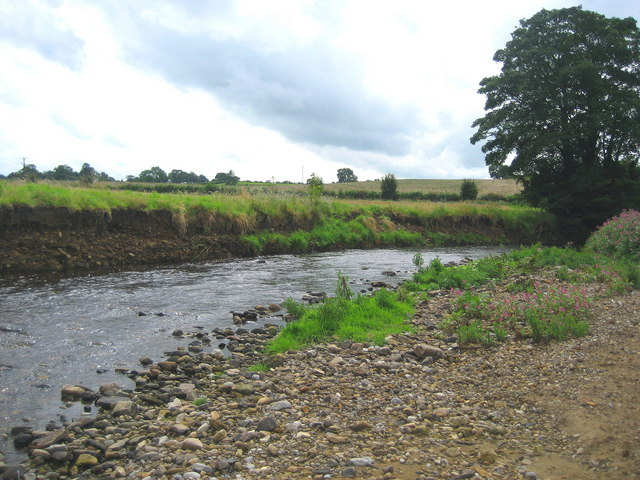
- River Laver near Ripon

Location
- Country: England

Physical characteristics
- Source
  - location: Confluence of North Gill Beck and South Gill Beck at Dallowgill
  - coordinates: 54°8′22″N 1°42′30″W
  - elevation: 170 metres (560 ft)
- Mouth
  - location: River Skell at Ripon
  - coordinates: 54°7′55″N 1°32′8″W
  - elevation: 33 metres (108 ft)
- Length: 15 km (9.3 mi)
- Discharge
  - average: 1.1 m^{3}/s (39 cu ft/s)

The River Laver is a tributary of the River Skell, itself a tributary of the River Ure in North Yorkshire, England. The name is of Brittonic origin, from labaro, meaning "talkative", i.e. a babbling brook. The Afon Llafar in Wales shares the same name.

The Laver is noted as a fly fishing river, especially for brown trout and grayling.

== Course ==
The river has its origins in a number of small streams which rise on the moors between upper Nidderdale and Kirkby Malzeard. The two largest of these streams, North Gill Beck and South Gill Beck, meet in a narrow wooded valley at Dallowgill to form the River Laver. The river continues to flow through a narrow wooded valley, before broadening at Laverton. The riverbanks again become densely wooded near Winksley, then become more open and shallow as the river approaches Ripon. The river joins the River Skell at the western edge of Ripon.

== Hydrology ==
The flow of the River Laver has been measured at a weir in Ripon, near to its confluence with the Skell since 1977. The thirty seven year record shows that the catchment of 88 square kilometres (34 sq mi) to the gauging station yields an average flow of 1.1 cubic metres per second (39 cu ft/s). In June 2007 the highest river level of 1.9 metres (6 ft 3 in) over the weir was recorded, which was estimated to have a flow of 65 cubic metres per second (2,300 cu ft/s).
