= Low Ellington =

Village in North Yorkshire, England

Coordinates: 54.24689°N 1.69117°W

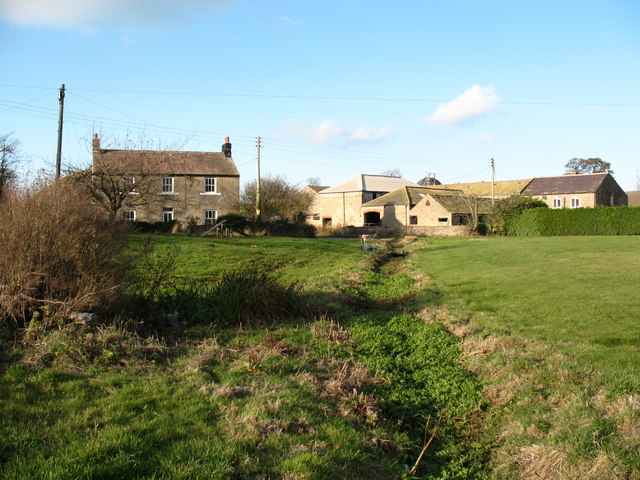
- Farm and houses at Low Ellington

- Location within North Yorkshire
- OS grid reference: SE202835
- Civil parish: Ellington High and Low
- Unitary authority: North Yorkshire
- Ceremonial county: North Yorkshire
- Region: Yorkshire and the Humber
- Country: England
- Sovereign state: United Kingdom
- Post town: RIPON
- Postcode district: HG4
- Police: North Yorkshire
- Fire: North Yorkshire
- Ambulance: Yorkshire

Low Ellington is a small village in lower Wensleydale in North Yorkshire, England about 2 miles (3.2 km) north-west of Masham. It is 0.5 miles (0.8 km) east of the much larger village of High Ellington.

The village was historically also known as Nether Ellington. Low or Nether Ellington formed, with High or Over Ellington, a township in the ancient parish of Masham in the North Riding of Yorkshire. From 1974 to 2023 it was part of the Borough of Harrogate, it is now administered by the unitary North Yorkshire Council.

At the time of the Domesday Book it was in the possession of Count Alan of Brittany. In 1566 Christopher Danby acquired the manor of Nether Ellington from Henry Lord Scrope, and the manor remained in the Danby family until 1883.

== See also ==
- Listed buildings in Ellington High and Low
