= Roundhill Reservoir =

Reservoir in North Yorkshire, England

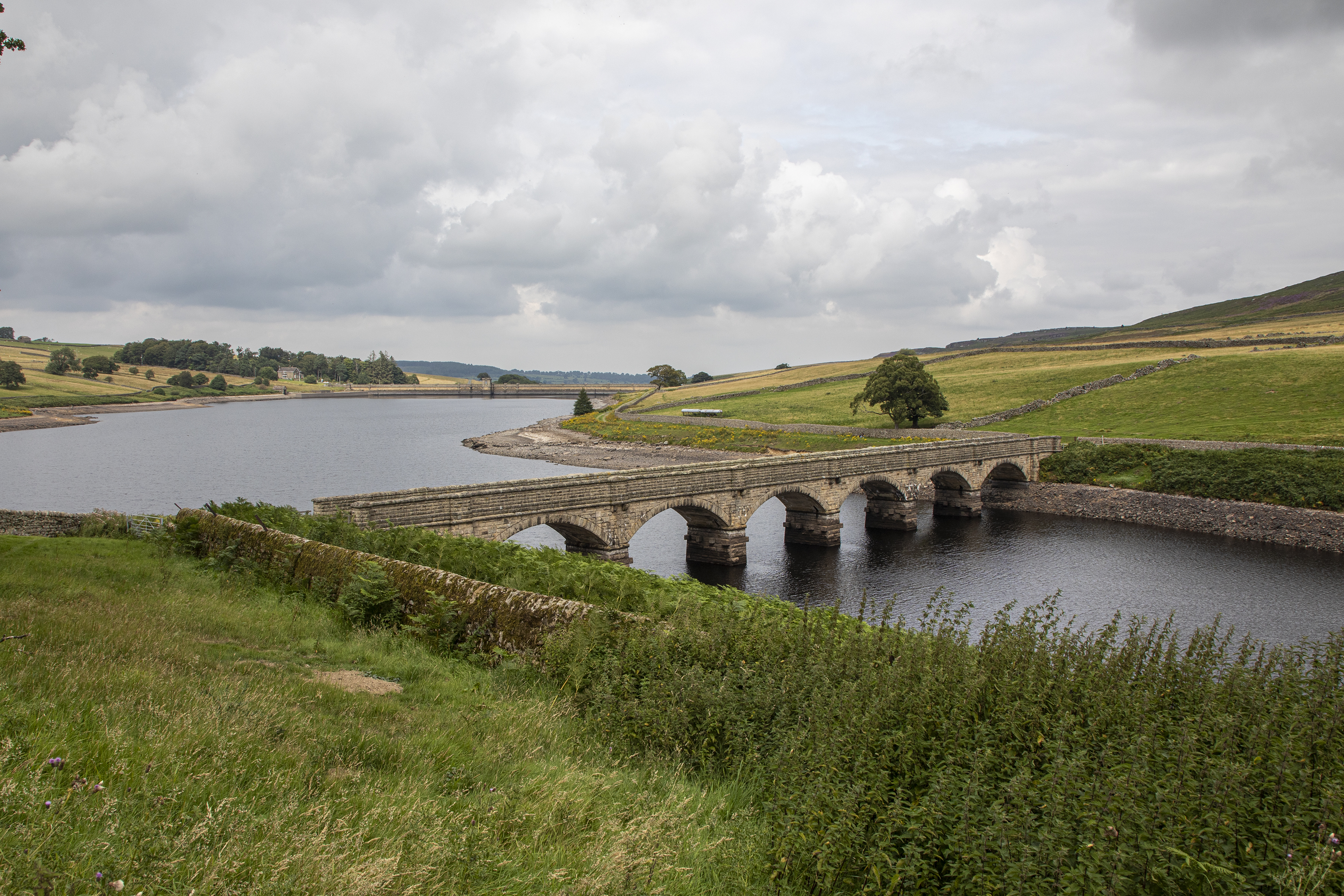
- Looking west over Roundhill Reservoir

- Location within North Yorkshire
- Location: North Yorkshire
- Coordinates: 54°11′20″N 1°46′18″W
- Type: reservoir
- Basin countries: United Kingdom

Roundhill Reservoir is situated near Leighton Reservoir in North Yorkshire, England. It was constructed by Harrogate Corporation early in the 20th century. Water from the reservoir is fed into Yorkshire Water's grid.

Roundhill reservoir is overlooked by a stone tower, Carlesmoor sighting tower, which was used to triangulate the end points of a water tunnel from the reservoir to Harrogate. It is one of several Colsterdale towers.

Although not in Nidderdale, the reservoir is within the Nidderdale Area of Outstanding Natural Beauty.

== History ==
Roundhill Reservoir was built for Harrogate Corporation. It was completed in 1913, at a cost of £500,000. In 1908, while Roundhill was being constructed, Leeds Corporation began building Leighton Reservoir close by. Both reservoirs impounded the water from Pott Beck: Harrogate was permitted by Parliament to take no more than 4 million gallons per day, the rest going to Leeds.

The reservoir later was under the jurisdiction of the Claro Water Board.
