= High Ellington =

Village in North Yorkshire, England

Coordinates: 54.24498°N 1.70033°W

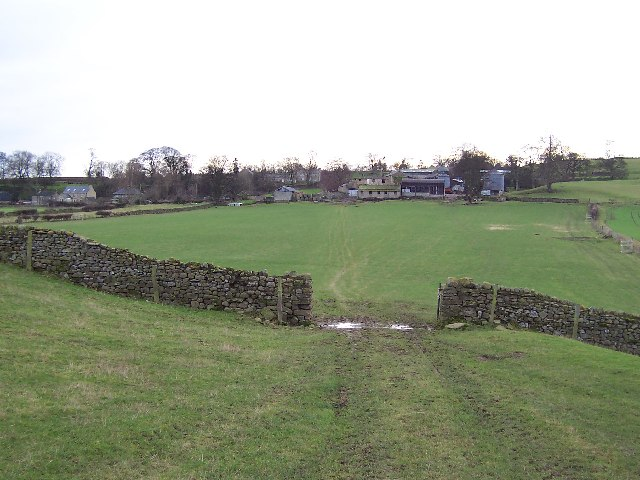
- High Ellington from the north

- Location within North Yorkshire
- OS grid reference: SE196832
- Civil parish: Ellington High and Low
- Unitary authority: North Yorkshire
- Ceremonial county: North Yorkshire
- Region: Yorkshire and the Humber
- Country: England
- Sovereign state: United Kingdom
- Post town: RIPON
- Postcode district: HG4
- Police: North Yorkshire
- Fire: North Yorkshire
- Ambulance: Yorkshire

High Ellington is a village in lower Wensleydale in North Yorkshire, England, about 2.5 miles (4 km) north-west of Masham. The smaller village of Low Ellington is 0.6 miles (0.97 km) to the east. High Ellington is the largest settlement in the civil parish of Ellington High and Low, which also includes Low Ellington and the scattered settlement of Sutton (which includes High Sutton, Low Sutton, Sutton Penn and Sutton Grange). The population of the parish was estimated at 60 in 2013.

High Ellington was historically, with Low Ellington, a township in the ancient parish of Masham in the North Riding of Yorkshire. At the time of the Domesday Book it was in the possession of Count Alan of Brittany. It became a civil parish in 1866, then known as Ellingtons. In 1886 Sutton was transferred to the parish from Healey with Sutton. From 1974 to 2023 it was part of the Borough of Harrogate, it is now administered by the unitary North Yorkshire Council.

The parish now shares a grouped parish council, known as Masham Parish Council, with Masham, Burton on Yore and Swinton with Warthermarske.

== See also ==
- Listed buildings in Ellington High and Low
