= Leeds Pals =

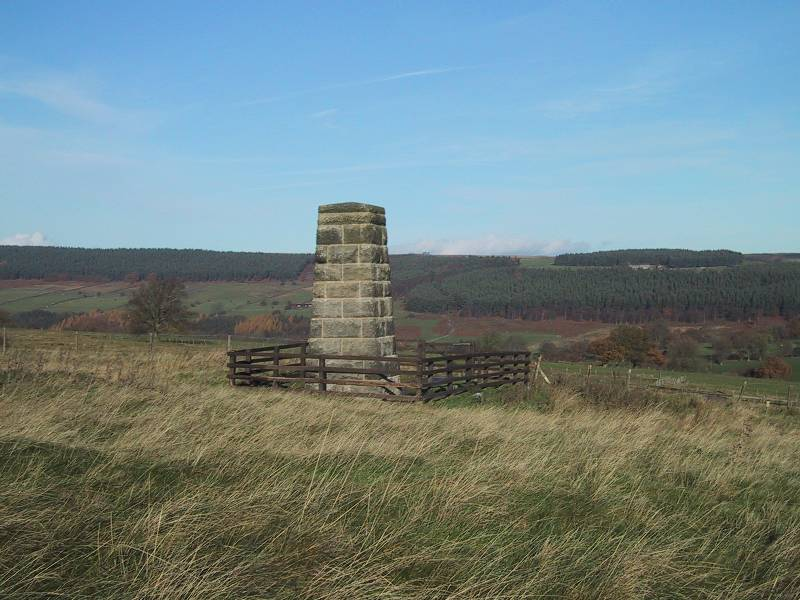
Leeds Pals Memorial at Colsterdale

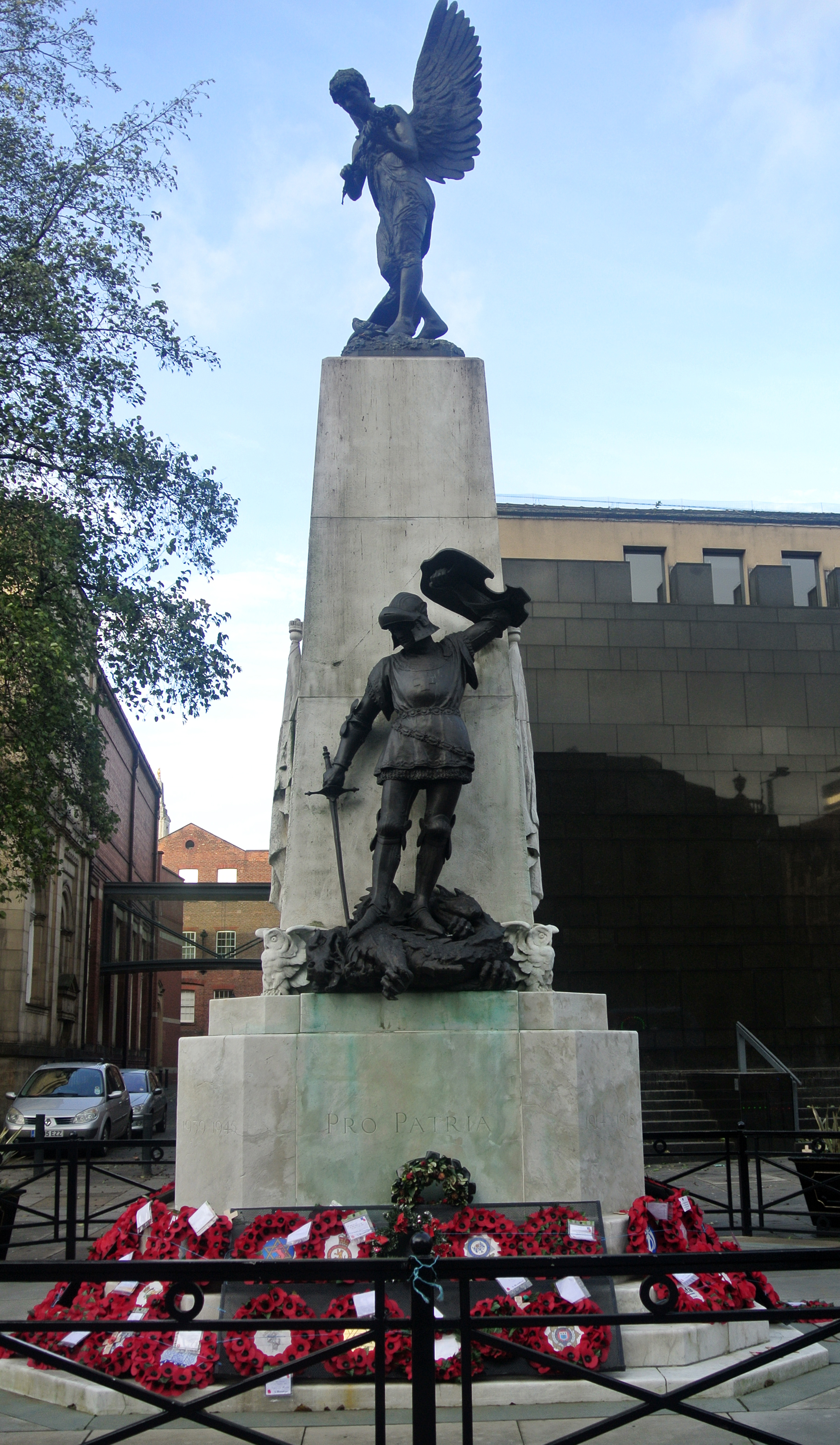
War memorial in Leeds

The Leeds Pals were a First World War Pals battalion of Kitchener's Army raised in the West Yorkshire city of Leeds. When the battalion was taken over by the British Army it was officially named the 15th Battalion (1st Leeds), The Prince of Wales's Own (West Yorkshire Regiment).

The battalion was formed in September 1914 by a committee led by Lord Brotherton, politician Francis Martineau Lupton and his brother Arthur G. Lupton. The brothers' brother, Lord Mayor of Leeds Sir Charles Lupton, was filmed in 1915 inspecting the Leeds Pals at a camp near Colsterdale in the Yorkshire Dales where the battalion underwent training. The Lord Mayor's brothers were also present at the event. The three sons of Francis Martineau Lupton - all educated at Rugby and Cambridge University - were killed during the Great War.

The battalion became part of the 93rd Brigade of the 31st Division, along with the two Bradford Pals battalions (16th and 18th Battalions, The West Yorkshire Regiment). In December 1915 the Leeds Pals were deployed to Egypt to defend the Suez Canal from the threat of the Ottoman Empire.

In March 1916 the battalion landed in France, joining the British build up for the Battle of the Somme. On the first day on the Somme, 1 July 1916, the 31st Division attacked towards the village of Serre and the Leeds Pals advanced from a line of copses named after the Gospels. The battalion was shelled in its trenches before Zero Hour (7.30 am) and when it advanced, it was met by heavy machine gun fire. A few men got as far as the German barbed wire but no further. Later in the morning the German defenders came out to clear the bodies off their wire, killing any that were still alive. The battalion casualties, sustained in the few minutes after Zero, were 24 officers and 504 other ranks, of which 15 officers and 233 other ranks were killed.

"The name of Serre and the date of 1st July is engraved deep in our hearts, along with the faces of our 'Pals', a grand crowd of chaps. We were two years in the making and ten minutes in the destroying." (Private A.V. Pearson, Leeds Pals)

In December 1917 the Leeds Pals were amalgamated with the 2nd Leeds battalion (17th Battalion, The West Yorkshire Regiment, a Bantam battalion) to form the 15th/17th Battalion, The West Yorkshire Regiment.

== In popular culture ==
John Harris' novel Covenant With Death (Arrow Books Ltd., London, 1961) is a lightly fictionalized account of a private in the Sheffield City Battalion from their formation until the first day of the Battle of the Somme. A.V. Pearson's quote (above), slightly modified, is the last paragraph of the novel.

Benjamin Till's 2014 musical Brass is a fictional musical based on real life stories from the Leeds Pals.
