= Masham Mechanics' Institute =

Mechanics' institute in Masham, North Yorkshire, England

Coordinates: 54°13′19″N 1°39′29″W

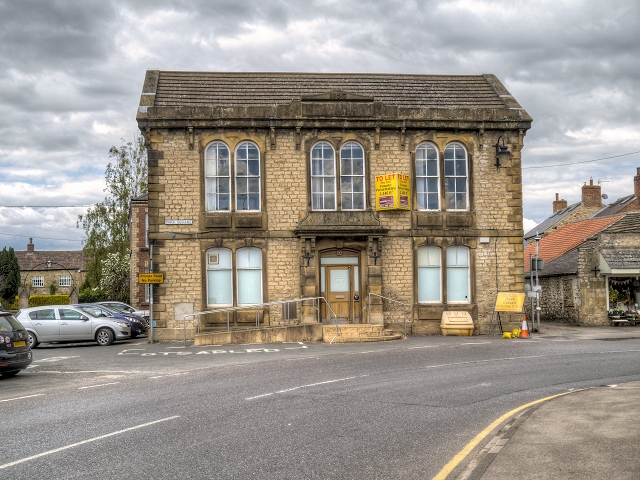
The building, which fronts onto Park Square, in 2014

Masham Mechanics' Institute is a historic building in Masham, a town in North Yorkshire, in England.

The mechanics' institute was founded on 27 August 1848, with the intention of providing a reading room and library, and to hold a series of lectures. Thomas Riddell, the reverend of the Church of St Mary the Virgin, Masham, was appointed as the institute's president, and devoted considerable time to it. He died suddenly in 1855, and this inspired the construction of a permanent base for the institute. A building was constructed on Park Square, to a design by William Perkin, at a cost of £736. It opened on 3 November 1856, providing a reading room, lecture room, committee room, classrooms, and accommodation for the librarian. The ground floor was later converted into a bank, while the upper floor became a public library. Both closed in 2012, and the building was converted into holiday lets. The building was grade II listed in 2015.

The building is constructed of limestone with sandstone dressings, on a plinth, with quoins, a floor band, a cornice on shaped consoles, a parapet with a central datestone, and a tile roof. There are two storeys, a front range of three bays and rear extensions. The central doorway has a segmental head and a cornice on paired consoles. The windows are paired sashes with aprons, those on the ground floor with segmental heads and keystones, and those on the upper floor with round heads.

== See also ==
- Listed buildings in Masham
