= York Brewery =

Former brewery in York, England (1996–2018)

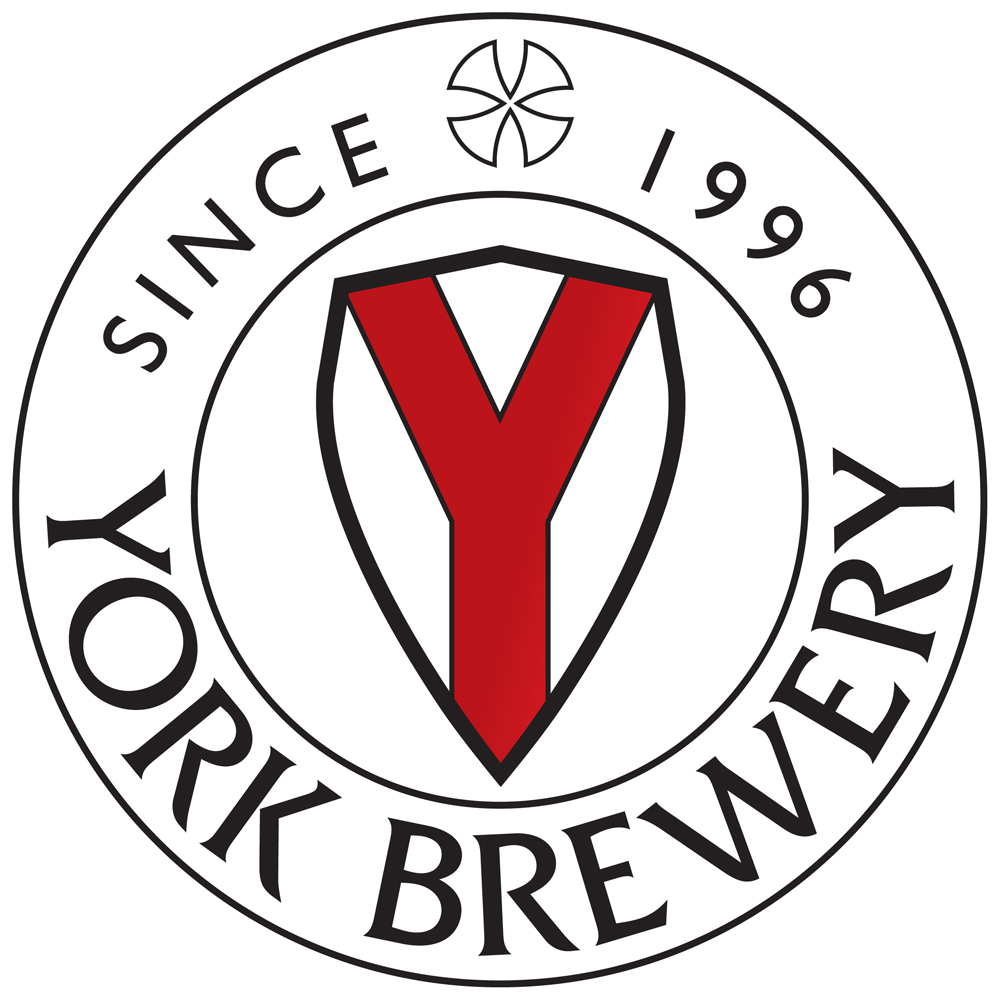

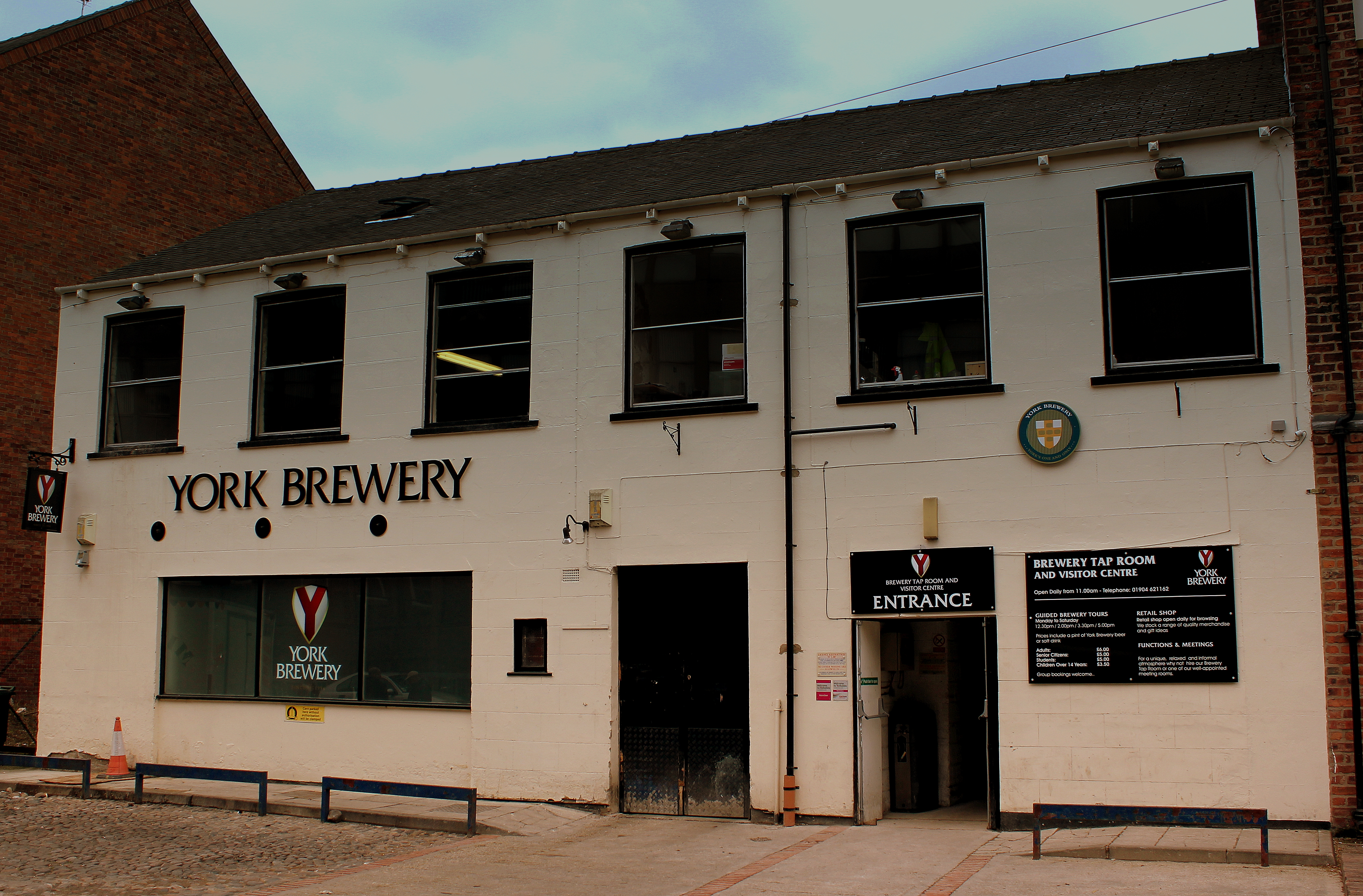
- The brewery in 2013
- Location: 12 Toft Green, York, North Yorkshire, England
- Opened: 1996
- Owner: Black Sheep Brewery

York Brewery is a former brewery in York, England, originally located within the city walls. It opened in May 1996 using the disused equipment of Lions Original Brews and was the first brewery inside the walls for 40 years. In 2000 it opened its first pub, The Last Drop Inn, followed by the Three-Legged Mare in 2001. The brewery expanded production in 2007 but was taken over by Mitchell's of Lancaster the following year. Mitchell's, and therefore York Brewery, went into administration in 2018, after which the brewery and four pubs were purchased by Black Sheep Brewery, with brewing moved to Black Sheep's premises in Masham.

== History ==
York Brewery opened in May 1996 in York, England, using the disused brewery equipment of Lions Original Brews from Burnley, and was the first brewery within the city walls for 40 years. Faced with difficulty in finding outlets for its beer, in 2000 the brewery opened its first pub, The Last Drop Inn, in a late-16th-century, Grade II listed building on Colliergate in York. A second pub, the Three-Legged Mare, opened on High Petergate in July 2001.

In 2007 it expanded its production capacity by 50 per cent to 150 barrels a week.

The brewery was taken over by Mitchell's Hotels and Inns of Lancaster in December 2008, which planned to expand the business and create jobs. In December 2018 Mitchell's, and therefore York Brewery, went into administration, with the brewery and four pubs subsequently being purchased by Black Sheep Brewery. Brewing was moved to Black Sheep's premises in Masham, although its stated intention was to find a new site in York.

The brewery was located centrally within York on Toft Green and offered tours of its facilities to the public. While the frontage on Toft Green is relatively modern, the rear of the building overlooking Micklegate is significantly older and was the birthplace of Joseph Hansom, the inventor of the Hansom cab. The building was also where the furniture company Whitby Oliver was founded in 1897; that company remains the landlord, and its logo can still be seen on the side of the top-floor offices on Micklegate.

== Core beers ==
York Brewery produced five core beers that were available all year round.

== Awards ==
In summer 2015, Otherside IPA was awarded a gold award in the 'Premium Bitters & Pale Ales' category at the SIBA NE Region Beer Competition 2015 and a second place in the Pale & Amber 4.5–5% category in the York CAMRA LocALE awards 2015. Both were awarded at the York Beer & Cider Festival 2015 on the Knavesmire in York.

Minster Ale scooped a bronze in the 'Bottled Gold Beers' category at the SIBA NE Region Beer Competition 2014.

In 2013, York Blonde took home a first place in the 'Beers under 4%' category in the York CAMRA LocALE awards.

The brewery's 'Centurion's Ghost Ale' was named champion in the Brewing Industry International Awards 2002 and won the 'Best Strong Bitter' gold medal at the Great British Beer Festival in 2006 and 2007. Its beer, 'Guzzler' won the gold medal in the bitter category of the Small Independent Brewers Association (SIBA) North Beer Competition in January 2006 and the gold medal in the bitter category of the North Beer Competition, held by the Society of Independent Brewers, in January 2007. 'Yorkshire Terrier' won the bronze medal in the Champion Beer of Britain competition held at the Great British Beer Festival in 2000, and the silver medal in the Society of Independent Brewers North Beer competition in February 2003.

== Beer name origins ==
Centurion's Ghost Ale, which is 5.4% alcohol by volume, is York Brewery's strongest beer and is named after an incident when an apprentice plumber saw Roman soldiers marching through the cellar of Treasurer's House in York.

'Brideshead Bitter' (no longer available) was produced in conjunction with Castle Howard, where scenes from the television series Brideshead Revisited were filmed.

== Pubs ==
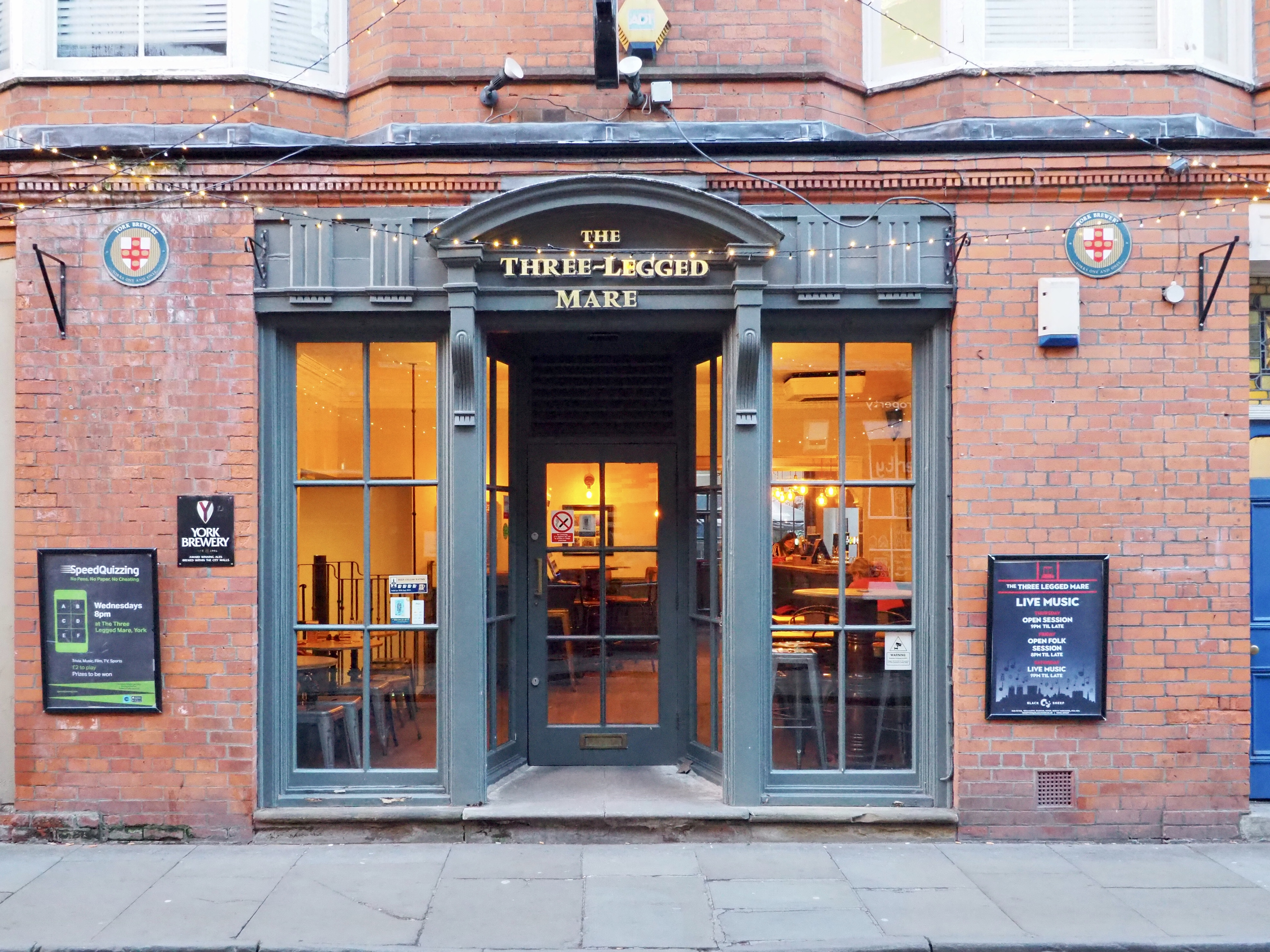
The Three-Legged Mare in 2023

As well as producing ales, the brewery also ran three pubs in York: The Three-Legged Mare, The Last Drop Inn and The Yorkshire Terrier Inn, and one, Mr. Foley's Cask Ale House, in Leeds. The Yorkshire Terrier was not acquired by Black Sheep Brewery when York Brewery was bought out of administration in December 2018, leaving two premises in York, The Three-Legged Mare and The Last Drop Inn, and one in Leeds. After Black Sheep Brewery went into administration in 2023, the brewery divested itself of The Last Drop Inn and Mr. Foleys in Leeds leaving only The Three-Legged Mare.

== See also ==
- List of breweries in England
