= Masham Methodist Church =

Church in Masham, North Yorkshire, England

Coordinates: 54°13′14″N 1°39′32″W

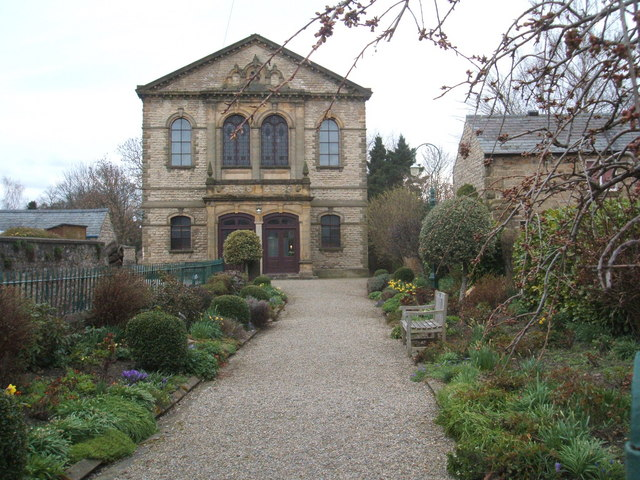
The church, which is set back from Park Street, in 2009

Masham Methodist Church is a historic building in Masham, a town in North Yorkshire, in England.

Methodism first came to Masham in the late 18th century, and the Wesleyan Methodist Church soon erected a chapel. In 1892, a new chapel was built on Park Street, in the neoclassical style. The building was grade II listed in 2004. In 2010, it was awarded a community grant from the National Churches Trust, and the whole building was refurbished and upgraded, the work including the replacement of the ground floor pews with more comfortable seating, and the installation of a toilet and an office.

The church is built of stone, with quoins, a floor band, a dentilled cornice and a slate roof. The entrance front has two storeys and four bays. In the centre is a double portico containing two segmental arched openings with keystones, divided by a column, and surmounted by an openwork balustrade with corner finials. It is flanked by segmental-headed windows with an band, and on the upper floor are round-headed windows. The middle pair have two lights and are flanked by half-columns carrying a moulded cornice. The outer windows have one light and keystones, and at the top is a pediment containing a decorative feature.

== See also ==
- Listed buildings in Masham
