= 27 Colliergate =

Listed pub in York, England

- The pub in 2026
- Interactive map of the 27 Colliergate area
- Former names: The Cocoa Rooms; Ye Olde Black Sheep Bottle Shoppe
- Alternative names: The Last Drop Inn

General information
- Status: Converted to public house
- Type: House (former), later commercial uses
- Location: Colliergate, York, England
- Coordinates: 53.95997°N 1.07963°W
- Year built: Late 16th century
- Renovated: Late 17th century (extended); Early 18th century (remodelled and extended); 20th century (modernised and shopfront)
- Owner: White Wells Pub Company

Design and construction
- Designations

Listed Building – Grade II
- Official name: 27, Colliergate
- Designated: 1 July 1968
- Reference no.: 1258002

Website
- Official website

27 Colliergate, now trading as The Last Drop Inn, is a Grade II listed public house on Colliergate in York, England. Built as a late‑16th‑century house, it was enlarged in the 17th and early 18th centuries, including a brick front added around 1725 and a major rear extension, and was modernised in the 20th century with a new shopfront. The building has housed a succession of businesses, and in 2000 York Brewery opened The Last Drop Inn as its first pub. After York Brewery and its tied pubs entered administration in 2018, the premises were bought by Black Sheep, which reopened it following refurbishment in 2021. It closed in 2023 and was acquired and reopened by the White Wells Pub Company in 2026.

== History ==
The building is a late‑16th‑century house on Colliergate that was extended in the late 17th century and remodelled and enlarged in the early 18th century, when the front was rebuilt in brick around 1725 and the rear was expanded to more than double its original size. It later received a 20th‑century modernisation and shopfront and was subsequently adapted for commercial use.

The 1851 directory of Kingston-upon-Hull and York records Edward Bell, a tobacco and snuff dealer, at No. 27, while the 1885 directory for York lists George Settle, a butcher, at the premises. The 1913 Kelly's Directory of the North and East Ridings of Yorkshire records Mrs Jane Hubie, the manageress of The Cocoa Rooms, at No. 27.

In 1968 the site was included within the newly established Central Historic Core conservation area, and on 1 July 1968, No. 27 was designated a Grade II listed building. It stands between Nos. 25–26 and No. 28, also Grade II listed.

In 2000, York Brewery opened The Last Drop Inn in the previously vacant commercial building at No. 27 as its first pub. York Brewery and its tied pubs entered administration in early 2018, and The Last Drop Inn was bought out of administration by Black Sheep shortly before Christmas that year. It closed in March 2020 during the COVID‑19 pandemic and reopened in October that year as Ye Olde Black Sheep Bottle Shoppe. Following a major refurbishment, it officially reopened under Black Sheep in October 2021, and retained the name The Last Drop Inn. It closed permanently in June 2023 before being bought and reopened by the White Wells Pub Company in August 2026.

== Architecture ==
The front part of the building is timber‑framed and finished in painted render, with the rear wing also rendered. It has a pantile roof with a shortened brick chimney to the left. The building has three storeys and an attic, with two windows on the front. The first and second‑floor windows are four‑pane sashes set on painted sills, with simple raised bands above them. At the eaves is a decorative cornice, and the attic has two dormer windows with small‑pane Yorkshire sashes.

=== Interior ===
Inside, the staircase rises through an open well from the ground to the second floor, with shaped balusters, a turned newel at the base and a moulded handrail; the attic stair has a closed string and slimmer balusters.

Part of the interior in 2025

On the first floor, the subdivided rear room has chamfered beams and keeps its fireplace, raised and fielded dado panelling, and a three‑panel cupboard door. The second‑floor front rooms are divided by a studded partition that includes a doorway later blocked with wall tiles, and both rooms have spine beams with ogee stops. The left‑hand room has a moulded fireplace set within a later surround with added mouldings and a cornice shelf, while the right‑hand room shows an exposed studded cross wall. The rear room has chamfered beams. In the attic, timber‑framed walls and studded partitions survive.

== See also ==
- Listed buildings in York (within the city walls, northern part)
