= Old Gaol and Carriage House =

Building in Masham, North Yorkshire, England

Coordinates: 54°13′19″N 1°39′15″W

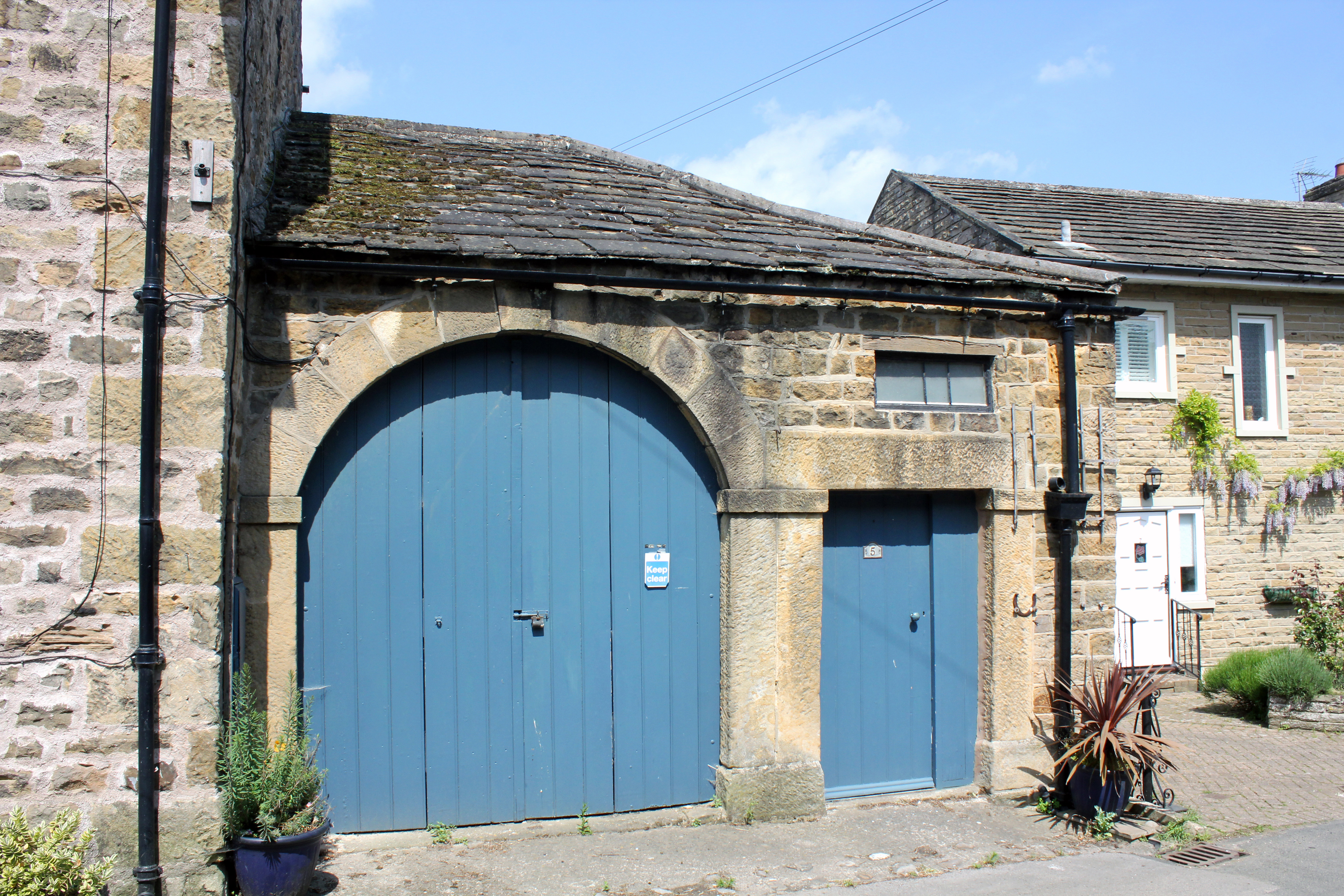
The front of the building, on Millgate, in 2023

The Old Gaol and Carriage House is a historic building in Masham, a town in North Yorkshire, in England.

The building was constructed in the mid or late 18th century, as the town's gaol and a carriage house which housed the town's fire engine. The carriage house was later used as a garage, while the gaol became part of a house. The building was grade II listed in 1979. By 2011, it was a four-bedroom property which was purchased for £350,000. The new owners converted it into a bed and breakfast, which in 2015 was named the best bed and breakfast in the world.

The building is in stone with a stone slate roof, hipped on the right, and one storey. On the front is a round-arched doorway with an impost band and a keystone. To the right is a flat-headed doorway with an impost band, and above it is a small barred window. In the right return is a nail-studded door with an iron locking-bar.

== See also ==
- Listed buildings in Masham
