= Masham Town Hall =

Municipal building in Masham, North Yorkshire, England

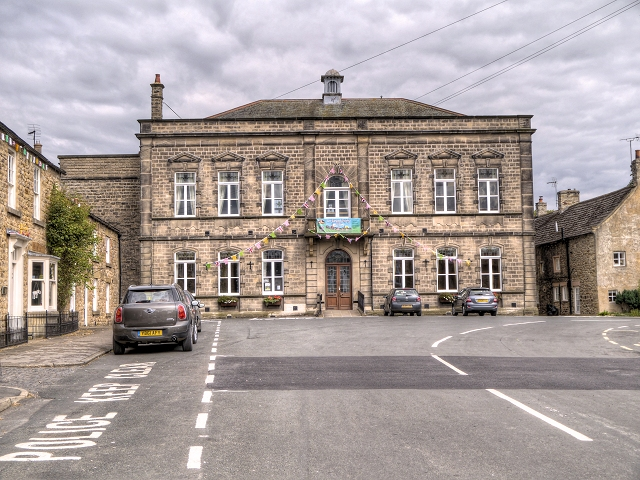
- Masham Town Hall

- Shown in North Yorkshire
- 54.2221°N 1.6554°W
- Location: Little Market Place, Masham

History
- Built: 1913

Site notes
- Architect: John Houfe
- Architectural style: Neoclassical style
- Website: Masham Town Hall

Listed Building – Grade II
- Official name: Town Hall
- Designated: 28 April 1986
- Reference no.: 1167212

Masham Town Hall is a municipal building in the Little Market Place, Masham, North Yorkshire, England. It is used as an events venue and meeting place of Masham Parish Council, and is a grade II listed building.

== History ==
Following significant population growth, largely associated with the status of Masham as a market town, the area became an urban district in 1894. In the early 20th century, the new council decided to procure an events venue for the town: they site they chose on the north side of the Little Market Place had been occupied by a row of single-storey houses. The new building was financed by a bequest from Samuel Lister, 1st Baron Masham who had died in 1906.

Construction work on the new building began in 1912. It was designed by John Houfe of Harrogate in the neoclassical style, built in ashlar stone at a cost of £3,751 and was officially opened on 24 May 1913. The design involved a symmetrical main frontage with seven bays facing onto the Little Market Place. The central bay featured a doorway with a fanlight and a keystone, flanked by rusticated pilasters and brackets supporting a stone balcony; there was a French door with a fanlight and keystone, flanked by pilasters, on the first floor. The other bays were fenestrated by casement windows with architraves and keystones on the ground floor and by casement windows with architraves, friezes and pediments on the first floor. At roof level there was a frieze, cornice and parapet as well as a central cupola. Internally, the principal room was the main assembly hall on the first floor.

During the First World War, the town hall was used as a Red Cross Voluntary Aid Detachment auxiliary hospital for wounded service personnel. A wooden plaque commemorating the contribution of local service personnel who had served in the war was unveiled inside the building by Lady Cunnliffe Lister in April 1929.

By the time of the Second World War, the town hall was mainly operating as a cinema but, in the second half of the 20th century, the building began hosting a broader range of community activities again. In 1965, the first of a series of annual steam rallies was held in the outskirts of Masham, raising funds towards the upkeep of the town hall.

Fundraising to support the cost of operating the building was undertaken by the Masham Town Hall Association from 1967, and by the Masham Town Hall Community Charity from 2012.

In May 2015, the town hall hosted the folk rock band, Lindisfarne, with Rod Clements fronting the group for the first time. As of 2025, Masham Parish Council hold their monthly meeting in the Committee Room.

== See also ==
- Listed buildings in Masham
