= Nutwith Cote =

Historic building in North Yorkshire, England

Coordinates: 54°12′21″N 1°38′49″W

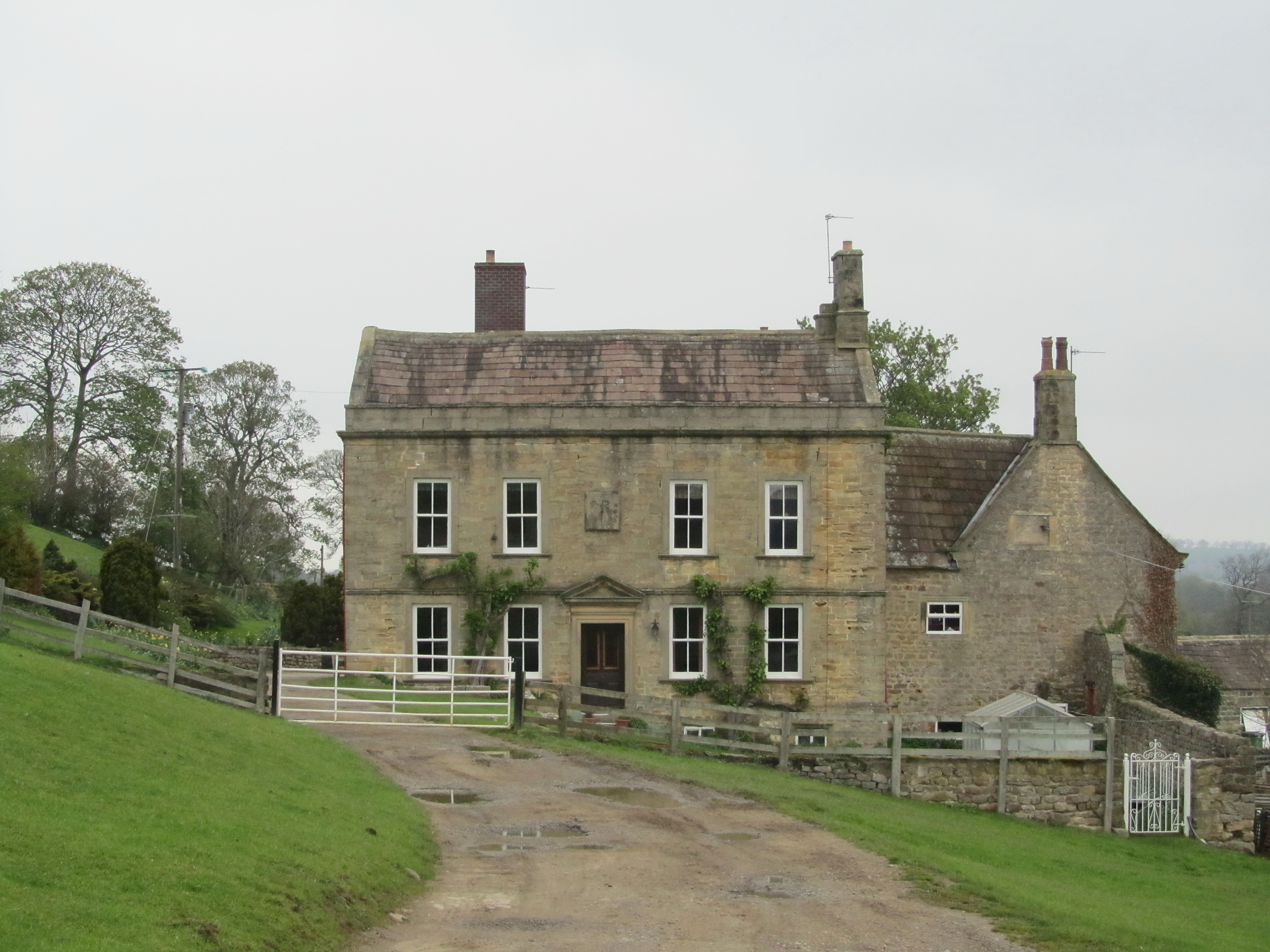
The building, in 2012

Nutwith Cote is a historic building in Burton-on-Yore, a village in North Yorkshire, in England.

There was already a farm on the site in the 12th century, when Fountains Abbey acquired it from Richard de Hedune. It served as a monastic grange until the Dissolution of the Monasteries, when it was given to Richard Gresham. In 1582, his descendant, William Gresham, sold the farm to Christopher Beckwith, and it remained in the Beckwith family for many generations.

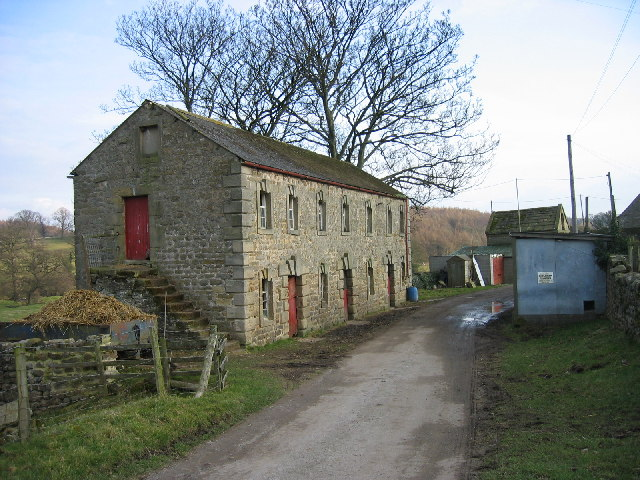
The stables, in 2006

The oldest parts of the present house are the rear wings, dating from the early 17th century. The main front was added in the late 18th century. A grand stable was constructed in the early 18th century, and the farm became a noted centre for racehorse breeding, with the horse Bartlett's Childers being stabled there. Of similar date is a coach house, which incorporates 16th-century beehives. Further south are a mid-18th century barn and dovecote. The house, stables, coach house and barn are all Grade II* listed, while the dovecote is grade II listed.

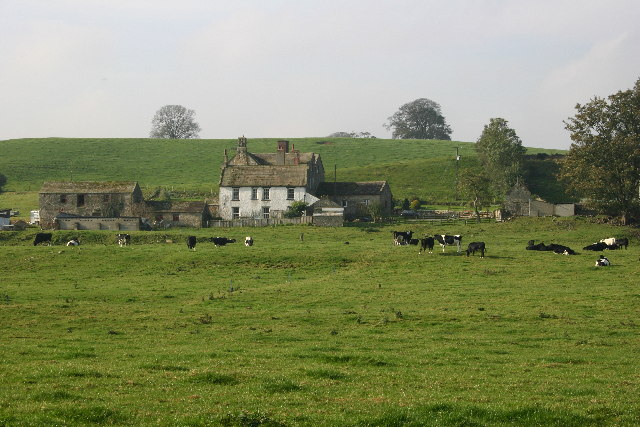
Rear view of the house, showing the 17th century wing

The farmhouse is built of stone, with a moulded cornice, a coped parapet, and a stone slate roof with stone coping and shaped kneelers. The main range dates from the 18th century, and has two storeys and a cellar, and four bays. The central doorway has an architrave, a pulvinated frieze and a pediment, and above it is a sundial. The windows on the front are sashes with plain surrounds and moulded sills. To the right and lower is the 17th-century wing, which contains two windows, one with a chamfered surround and above one with a moulded architrave.

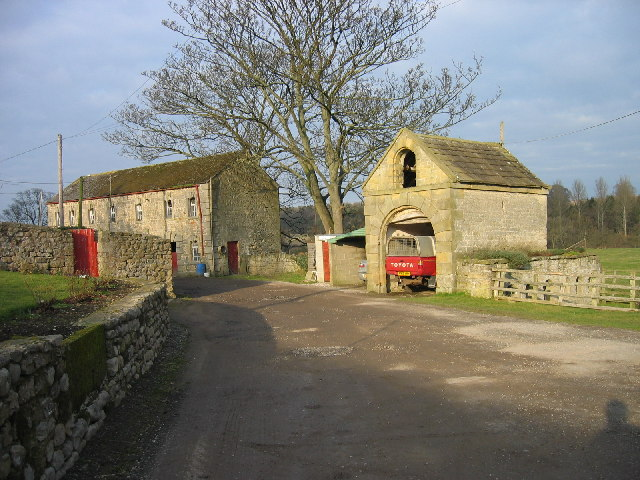
The coach house, in 2006

The stables are also built of stone, and have chamfered quoins and a corrugated asbestos roof. There are two storeys and seven bays. On the front are three doorways with chamfered quoined surrounds and tripartite keystones. The windows are casements with projecting plain stone surrounds and tripartite keystones.

The coach house, is similarly built of stone, with quoins, an eaves band, and a stone roof with stone coping. It is a small building, with a single storey and a single bay. It contains an arched entrance with rusticated voussoirs and a keystone. Above, in the gable, is an arched opening with a keystone. To the right is a range of six 16th-century arched bee hives with moulded surrounds and semicircular apses.

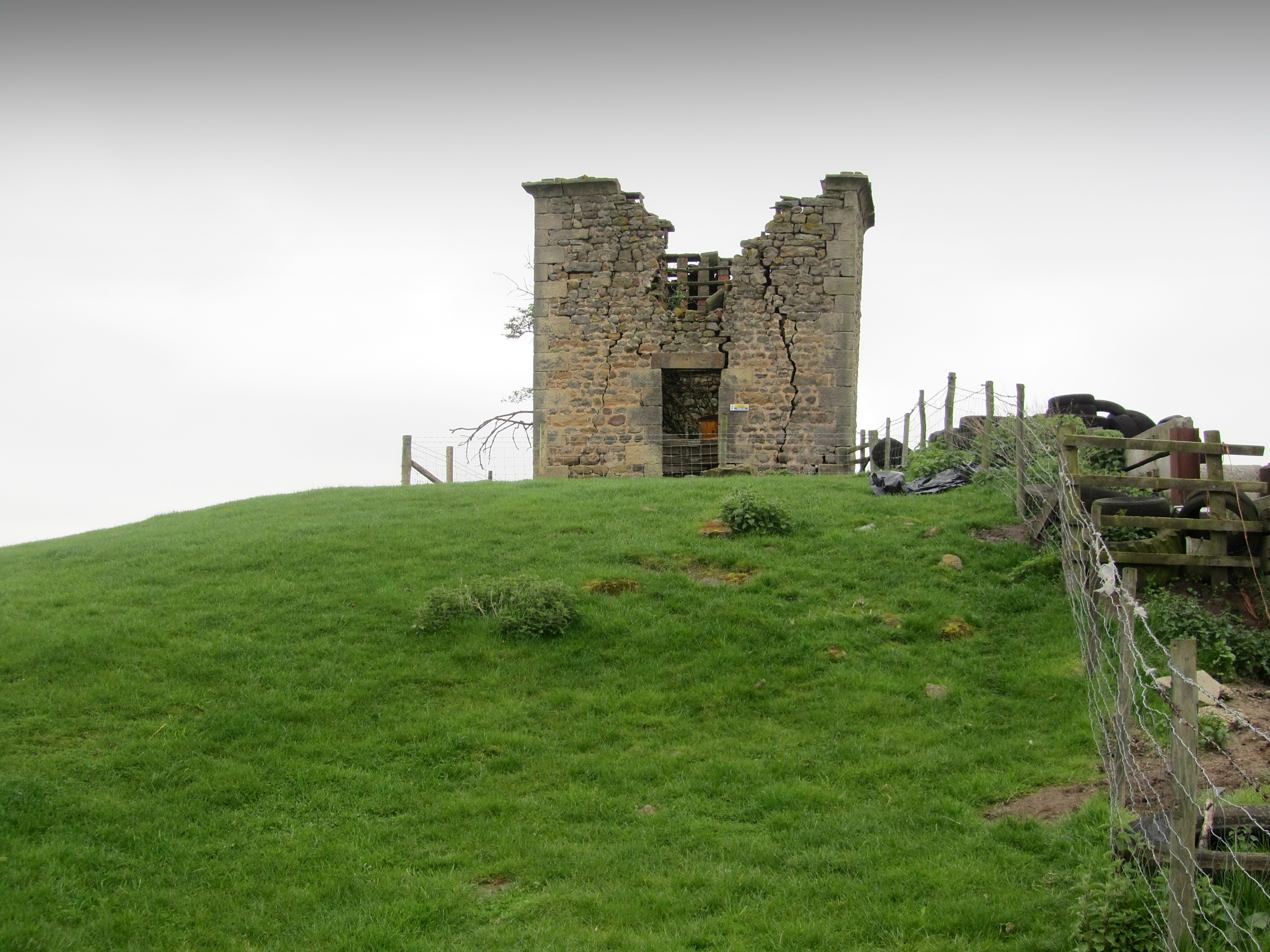
The dovecote, in 2012

The stone barn has a stone slate roof with moulded kneelers and stone coping. There is a single storey and three bays. In the centre is an arched wagon entrance with moulded imposts, voussoirs and a keystone. This is flanked by two giant Doric pilasters on plinths, carrying an entablature with a band, a frieze and a moulded cornice. In each outer bay is a doorway with a square opening above.

The stone dovecote is now a ruin. It has quoins and a coved cornice. It contains a doorway with a lintel, and above it is a partially ruined oval window.

== See also ==
- Grade II* listed buildings in North Yorkshire (district)
- Listed buildings in Burton-on-Yore
