= Masham Market Cross =

Structure in Masham, North Yorkshire, England

Coordinates: 54°13′18″N 1°39′21″W

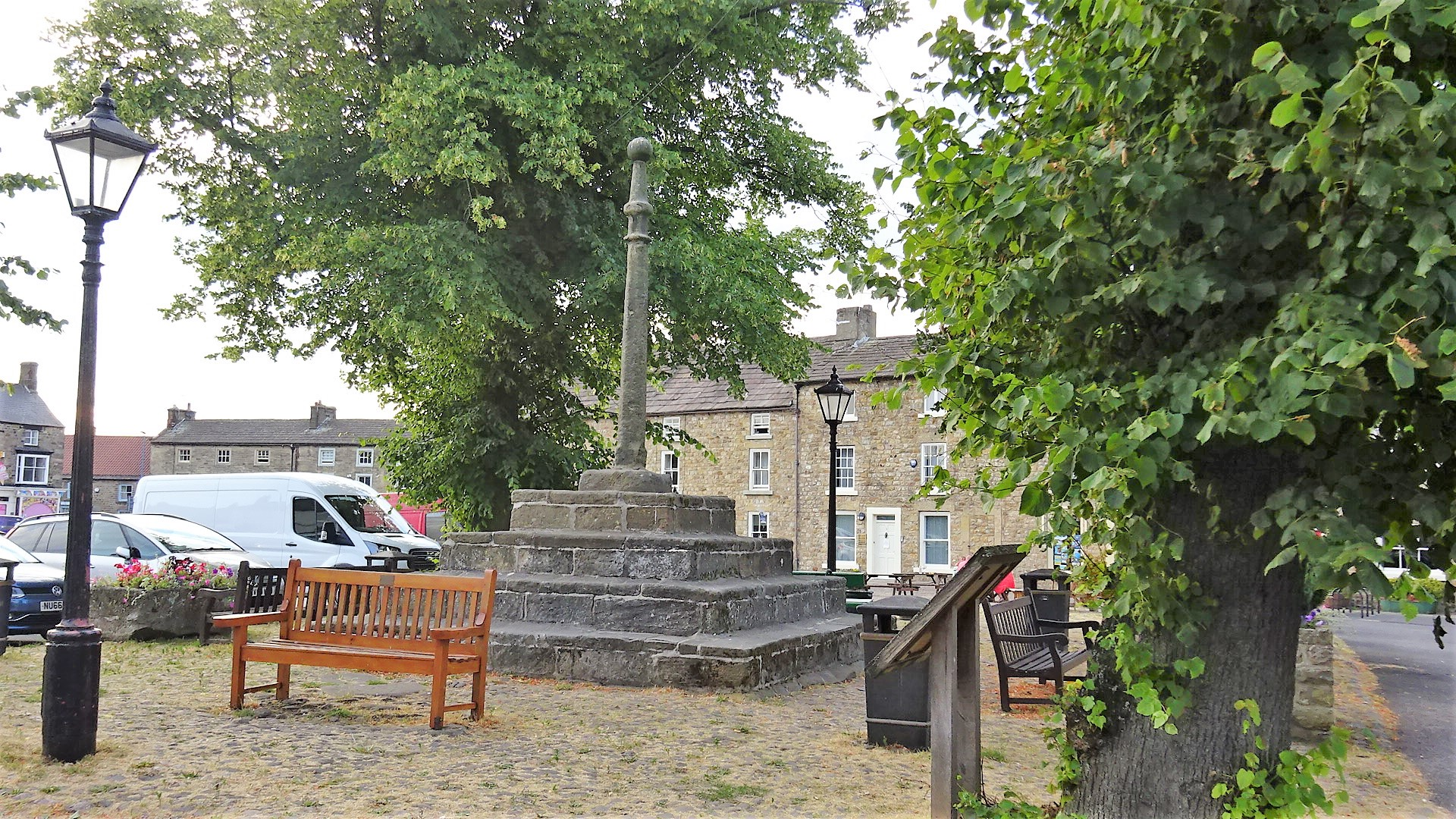
The cross, in 2018

Masham Market Cross is a historic structure in Masham, a town in North Yorkshire, in England.

Masham received a market charter in 1251, and the market cross was erected in the marketplace during the mediaeval period. The base survives, but the upper part of the cross was removed and a new shaft erected in the 18th century. It was grade II listed in 1966, and is also a scheduled monument.

The cross is built of stone. It consists of a tall octagonal shaft with a chamfered projecting band near the top, a frieze, a band, and a conical capstone with a ball finial, set on a four-step podium which is five metres square.

== See also ==
- Listed buildings in Masham
