= Listed buildings in Masham =

Masham is a civil parish in the county of North Yorkshire, England. It contains 70 listed buildings that are recorded in the National Heritage List for England. Of these, one is listed at Grade II*, the middle of the three grades, and the others are at Grade II, the lowest grade. The parish contains the market town of Masham and the surrounding area. Many of the listed buildings are grouped in and around Market Place, and these include a church with a cross shaft in the churchyard, a market cross and the town hall. Here and elsewhere, most of the listed buildings are houses, cottages and associated structures, shops and offices. The others include three bridges, a school, a former watermill, a hotel and a public house, a farmhouse, a former gaol, a former mechanics' institute, a Methodist church and a telephone kiosk.

== Key ==
Grade	Criteria
II*	Particularly important buildings of more than special interest
II	Buildings of national importance and special interest

== Buildings ==
Name and location	Photograph	Date	Notes	Grade
Churchyard cross 54.22114°N 1.65396°W		Early 9th century	The cross shaft is in the churchyard of St Mary's Church, to the south of the church. It is in sandstone, and the shaft is set on a later two-tier chamfered octagonal base. It has three rows of carved figures set in arcading, with a band between each row, and the top of shaft is fluted. The shaft dates from the 9th century and is a scheduled monument.	II
St Mary's Church; 54.22133°N 1.65387°W		12th century	The church has been altered and extended through the centuries, particularly in about 1860. It is built in sandstone with lead roofs, and consists of a nave with a clerestory, north and south aisles, a south porch, a north transept, a chancel with a north chapel, and a west steeple. The steeple has a tower with four stages, and contains floor bands, round-arched openings in the lower stages, and a corbel table with corner pinnacles. The top stage is octagonal, with diagonal buttresses, two-light windows with hood moulds, and an embattled parapet with pinnacles, and is surmounted by a tall spire. The west doorway has a round moulded arch, and two orders of colonnettes with scalloped capitals. The nave also has embattled parapets and pinnacles.	II*
Market cross 54.22156°N 1.65593°W		Medieval	The market cross is in stone. It consists of a tall octagonal shaft with a chamfered projecting band near the top, a frieze, a band, and a conical capstone with a ball finial, set on a four-step podium.	II
15 and 17 Market Place; 54.22193°N 1.65536°W		Early 17th century	A house divided into two houses, in stone on a plinth, with quoins, a moulded floor band, and a stone slate roof with shaped kneelers and stone coping. On the front are two doorways, the left with a chamfered surround, and the right with a moulded chamfered surround. Some of the windows are sashes, and others are mullioned, with some mullions missing.	II
Park House; 54.22252°N 1.65886°W	—	Early 17th century	The house, which has been extended, is in stone, with quoins, and stone flag roofs. There are two storeys, four bays, and a three-bay extension on the right. On the front is a porch, and the windows are sashes, some horizontally-sliding. In the extension is a full-height elliptical coach house arch with a dated and initialled quoin, blocked and infilled with two windows, and at the rear is a tall staircase window.	II
Morton House; 54.22109°N 1.65821°W		Late 17th century	The house is in stone with a stone slate roof. There are two storeys and an attic, and three bays. The central doorway has a moulded architrave, and is flanked by canted bay windows. On the upper floor are sash windows in moulded architraves, and a small blind opening, and in the attic are three small blind openings.	II
Low Burn Bridge; 54.21383°N 1.65429°W		1715	The bridge carries Thorpe Road over the River Burn. It is in stone, and consists of three segmental arches with voussoirs. There are four semicircular cutwaters rising as pilaster buttresses. The bridge has a band, and a coped parapet projecting and rising above the buttresses.	II
6 Church Street; 54.22207°N 1.65717°W		Early 18th century	The cottage is in stone and has a pantile roof with three eaves courses of stone slates, and a shaped kneeler and stone coping on the left. There are two storeys and three bays. On the front is a doorway, and to the left is a wagon door. In the centre is a 19th-century shop window with pilasters, a frieze and a cornice, and the other windows are sashes.	II
School; 54.22199°N 1.65507°W		Early 18th century	The school is in stone, it has roofs is stone slate and tile, and there are four blocks. The oldest block has a hipped roof, quoins, and three round-arched windows with Gibbs surrounds on the front. To the right is a later 18th-century block, with a pediment containing a blind oculus, and a doorway with a rusticated surround and a pediment. The left two blocks were rebuilt in 1834; the right has a gabled porch and a gabled bellcote, and the left is simpler and cottage-like.	II
The Old Mill; 54.22280°N 1.64899°W		Early 18th century	A watermill, later converted into two houses, in stone with quoins and hipped stone slate roofs. The central section has three storeys and three bays, to the left is a two-storey two-bay block, and to the right is a two-storey outshut. The main and left blocks contain doorways and casement windows; one of the windows in the main block has an inscribed and dated lintel. In the outshut is a segmental arch with voussoirs.	II
Kings Head Hotel; 54.22132°N 1.65596°W		Early to mid-18th century	The hotel is in stone, and has a Welsh slate roof with shaped kneelers and stone coping. There are three storeys and seven bays. The central doorway has a moulded surround and a fanlight. The windows are sashes in plain surrounds, and some on the top floor are horizontally-sliding.	II
Mill House; 54.22237°N 1.65180°W		Early to mid-18th century	The house is in stone, and has a stone slate roof with shaped kneelers and stone coping. There are two storeys and three bays. The central doorway has a moulded architrave, and is flanked by sash windows. The upper floor contains sash windows with chamfered surrounds, the outer two horizontally-sliding.	II
3 Market Place; 54.22191°N 1.65633°W		Mid-18th century	A house, later used for other purposes, in stone with a stone slate roof, and a shaped kneeler and stone coping on the left. There are two storeys and three bays. The central doorway has a fanlight, and the windows are sashes.	II
9 and 11 Market Place; 54.22187°N 1.65602°W		18th century	A house and a shop in stone with a stone slate roof. There are two storeys and four bays. Each part has a central doorway with a plain surround and a fanlight. On the ground floor, the house on the left has sash windows, and in the shop to the right are plate glass windows. The windows on the middle floor are sashes, and on the top floor are casement windows, all with plain surrounds.	II
22 Market Place; 54.22152°N 1.65702°W		18th century	A house, at one time a bank, and later a shop, it was refronted in the 19th century. It is in stone on a plinth, with an eaves band, and a Welsh slate roof with stone coping. There are two storeys and an attic, and three bays. The central doorway has pilasters, a fanlight, consoles, a frieze and a cornice, and is flanked by three-light mullioned windows. The upper floor contains two-light mullioned sash windows, and in the attic are two gabled dormers with paired sashes.	II
26 Market Place; 54.22136°N 1.65698°W		18th century	A house in stone, with a stone slate roof, and stone coping and a shaped kneeler on the right. There are three storeys and one bay. On the right is a doorway with a plain surround, to its left and on the middle floor is a sash window, and on the top floor is a horizontally-sliding sash.	II
36 and 38 Market Place; 54.22134°N 1.65618°W		18th century	A pair of houses in rendered stone with a stone slate roof. There are three storeys and two bays. The central doorway has a round arch, a plain surround on a plinth, a radial fanlight, imposts, voussoirs, and a double keystone. The windows on the lower two floors are sashes, and on the top floor are horizontally-sliding sashes.	II
Beaver's shop and house 54.22250°N 1.65685°W		18th century	The shop and the house to the rear are in stone, the shop has a hipped stone slate roof, and the house has a Welsh slate roof, a shaped kneeler and stone coping. There are two storeys, a front of one bay, and a canted bay on the right. The shop has a 19th-century shopfront with pilasters, consoles, a frieze and a cornice. In the corner bay is a doorway with a fanlight, and above is a sash window. The rear range has a sprocketed gable end with corbels.	II
Bordar House; 54.22184°N 1.65584°W		18th century	The building, on a corner site, is in stone with a stone slate roof. There are two storeys and an attic, and front of one bay. To the left is a doorway with a four-pane fanlight, and the windows are sashes.	II
Brooklyn House; 54.22138°N 1.65543°W		Mid-18th century	The house is in rendered stone with a stone slate roof. There are two storeys and two bays. In the right bay is a basket-arched carriage entrance with board doors, voussoirs, imposts and a keystone. The left bay contains a doorway, and the windows in both bays are sashes.	II
Cogden House; 54.22128°N 1.65631°W	centr	Mid-18th century	The house is in rendered stone on a plinth, with stone dressings, quoins, a floor band, and a projecting pediment containing a lunette. There are three storeys and three bays, and the windows are sashes.	II
College Grove; 54.22246°N 1.65719°W	—	Mid-18th century	The house is in stone, with quoins, and a stone slate roof with stone coping. There are three storeys and three bays. The main doorway has Doric pilasters on plinths, a frieze and a cornice, and to the right is a doorway with a simpler surround. In the left bay is a tripartite window, and the other windows are sashes.	II
Deepdale; 54.22139°N 1.65646°W	cntre	Mid-18th century	The house is in rendered stone, with stone dressings, an impost band, a floor band, and a stone slate roof. There are three storeys and two bays. On the left is a basket-arched carriage entrance. The doorway has a plain surround, a radial fanlight, and a round arch with two raised voussoirs and a double keystone. The windows are sashes with plain surrounds.	II
High Burn Bridge; 54.21689°N 1.66956°W		18th century	The bridge, which was widened in 1796 by John Carr, carries Swinton Road over the River Burn. It is in stone, and consists of a single segmental arch with voussoirs and a hood mould. The bridge has pilaster buttresses, each containing an arched niche, a band, and a coped parapet.	II
Lyth Cottage, shop and cottage 54.22192°N 1.65516°W	—	Mid-18th century	A house later divided into three, in stone, with quoins on the right, and a stone slate roof with shaped kneelers and stone coping. There are two storeys and three bays. In the centre is a door and a shopfront with pilasters, consoles, a frieze and a cornice, flanked by doorways with plain surrounds. The windows are horizontally-sliding sashes with plain surrounds.	II
Rudston House; 54.22225°N 1.65584°W		Mid-18th century	The house is in stone, and has a Welsh slate roof with stone coping. There are two storeys and four bays. In the third bay is a doorway with pilasters on plinths, a four-pane fanlight, a frieze, and a cornice on consoles. To its right is a canted bay window, the other windows are sashes, and in front of the left bay is a four-step mounting block.	II
South View; 54.22189°N 1.65622°W	—	Mid-18th century	A house, later a shop, in stone with a stone slate roof. There are three storeys and two bays. The doorway is in the centre, the windows are sashes, and all have plain surrounds.	II
The Old Rectory; 54.22128°N 1.65489°W		18th century	The house is in stone, with quoins, and a stone slate roof with shaped kneelers and stone coping, hipped on the wing. There are three storeys and three bays, and a three-storey one-bay wing recessed on the left. In the centre of the main block is a doorway with a fanlight, the wing also has a doorway, and the windows are sashes.	II
House to west of The Old Rectory; 54.22140°N 1.65533°W		18th century	The house, later used for other purposes, is in rendered stone, and has a stone slate roof. There are three storeys and two bays. On the front is a doorway, the windows on the lower two floors are horizontally-sliding sashes, and the top floor contains casement windows.	II
Through the Looking Glass; 54.22203°N 1.65632°W		Mid-18th century	A house, later a shop, in stone with a Welsh slate roof. There are two storeys and six bays. In the centre is a 19th-century shopfront, consisting of a doorway flanked by bay windows, with a frieze, consoles and a cornice. The windows are sashes, some horizontally-sliding.	II
Waterloo House; 54.22131°N 1.65696°W		Mid-18th century	The house is in stone on a plinth, with chamfered quoins, and a stone slate roof with shaped kneelers and stone coping. There are three storeys and two bays. The central doorway has a plain surround with plinths and imposts. The windows on the lower two floors are sashes, and those on the top floor are casements.	II
Masham Bridge; 54.22615°N 1.65473°W		1754	The bridge carries a road over the River Ure. It is in stone and consists of four segmental arches with voussoirs. The bridge has triangular cutwaters rising to canted refuges, a band and parapets.	II
Lows Mains Farmhouse; 54.24077°N 1.66134°W	—	1758	The farmhouse is in stone, and has a stone slate roof with shaped kneelers and stone coping. There are two storeys and two bays. The central doorway has a dated and inscribed lintel, and the windows are horizontally-sliding sashes in plain surrounds.	II
10, 12 and 14 Market Place; 54.22166°N 1.65702°W		Mid to late 18th century	Three houses, later shops and flats, in stone, with a stone slate roof, shaped kneelers and stone coping. There are three storeys and five bays. In the left bay is a segmental carriage arch with a keystone. In the right bay is a 20th-century shopfront with pilasters, a frieze and a cornice. Between them are doorways with fanlights and sash windows. The upper bays contain sash windows, some horizontally-sliding.	II
1–3 Silver Street; 54.22215°N 1.65664°W		Mid to late 18th century	A house and a shop in stone on a plinth, with a stone slate roof, hipped on the left, and with stone coping on the right. There are three storeys and three bays, and a two-storey single bay extension on the right. Steps lead up to a central doorway in the main block, with an architrave and a fanlight. It is flanked by 19th-century shop windows, above it are blind windows, and in the outer bays of the upper floors are sash windows; all the windows have architraves. In the extension is a square bay window, and a sash window above.	II
9 Silver Street; 54.22241°N 1.65678°W		Mid to late 18th century	A house, later used for other purposes, in stone on a plinth, with quoins, and a stone slate roof with shaped kneelers. There are two storeys and three bays. In the centre is a doorway and the windows are sashes, all with plain surrounds.	II
Ivydene; 54.22172°N 1.65483°W		Mid to late 18th century	The house is in stone, and has a roof of Welsh slate on the main block, and stone slate on the wing with stone coping on the right. There are two storeys, the main block has five bays, and the wing to the right has two. The main block has a central doorway with a fanlight, there is a blocked doorway in the wing, and in the left return is a blocked carriage entrance.	II
Kings Head Cottage; 54.22133°N 1.65574°W		Mid to late 18th century	The house is in stone with a stone slate roof, two storeys and two bays. In the right bay is a basket-arched carriageway with a keystone. To the left is a sash window in a blocked doorway, and to its left and on the upper floor are sash windows.	II
Radleigh House; 54.22125°N 1.65586°W		Mid to late 18th century	A house in stone, with chamfered quoins, and a stone slate roof with shaped kneelers and stone coping. There are two storeys and four bays. The doorway has a moulded surround and a fanlight, and the windows are sashes in plain surrounds.	II
The Gallery; 54.22144°N 1.65699°W		Mid to late 18th century	A house, later a shop, in stone, with chamfered quoins, and a Welsh slate roof. There re two storeys and three bays. The central doorway has a plain surround on a plinth and a fanlight, and the windows are sashes.	II
The Old Gaol and Carriage House; 54.22198°N 1.65409°W		Mid to late 18th century	The building is in stone with a stone slate roof, hipped on the right, and one storey. On the front is a round-arched doorway with an impost band and a keystone. To the right is a flat-headed doorway with an impost band, and above it is a small barred window. In the right return is a nail-studded door with an iron locking-bar.	II
11 Little Market Place; 54.22224°N 1.65565°W		Late 18th century	The house is in stone with a Welsh slate roof. There are two storeys and three bays. On the front is a doorway, and the windows are four-pane sashes.	II
2 and 4 Market Place; 54.22191°N 1.65702°W		Late 18th century	A house and a shop in stone with a Welsh slate roof. There are three storeys and two bays. Towards the centre is a doorway with a plain surround on a plinth, and a fanlight, to its right is an early 20th-century shopfront with a doorway, pilasters, consoles, a frieze and a dentilled cornice, and to its left is a bay window. The middle floor contains a sash window on the left and a bay window on the right, and on the top floor are horizontally-sliding sashes.	II
6 Market Place; 54.22183°N 1.65701°W		Late 18th century	The house is in stone with a Welsh slate roof. There are three storeys and two bays. The doorway is in the centre, and is flanked by large 20th-century windows. The windows on the middle floor are sashes, and on the top floor are horizontally-sliding sashes.	II
8 Market Place; 54.22177°N 1.65702°W		Late 18th century	A shop with a flat above, in stone with a Welsh slate roof. There are three storeys and one bay. The doorway on the left has a plain surround on a plinth and a fanlight, and to its right is a 20th-century shop window. On the middle floor is a casement window, and the top floor contains a horizontally-sliding sash window.	II
14, 16 and 18 Park Street; 54.22127°N 1.65819°W		Late 18th century	A row of three cottages in stone, with quoins on the left, and a stone slate roof with stone coping and shaped kneelers. On the front are three doorways with plain surrounds, and the windows are sashes, some horizontally-sliding.	II
Ariguane and The Cottage; 54.22293°N 1.65715°W	—	Late 18th century	A pair of cottages in stone with a Welsh slate roof. There are two storeys and three bays. The two doorways have plain surrounds, and the windows are two-pane casements in plain surrounds.	II
College House; 54.22249°N 1.65783°W		Late 18th century	The house, which has a 15th-century origin and was later rebuilt, is in stone, and has a stone slate roof with shaped kneelers and stone coping. There are two storeys, and three bays. The doorway is in the centre, and the windows are sashes.	II
Prospect House and Oaklands; 54.22088°N 1.65811°W		Late 18th century	A pair of houses in stone on a plinth, with quoins, and a stone slate roof with shaped kneelers and stone coping. There are three storeys, and each house has three bays and a central doorway with a fanlight and a plain surround. The windows are sashes, some on the top floor horizontally-sliding.	II
Stanhope; 54.22140°N 1.65527°W		Late 18th to early 19th century	The house is in stone, with chamfered quoins, and a stone slate roof with shaped kneelers and stone coping. There are two storeys and three bays. The central doorway has a moulded surround and a three-pane fanlight, and the windows are sashes with plain surrounds.	II
2 Church Street; 54.22210°N 1.65679°W		Early 19th century	The house is in stone with a stone slate roof. There are three storeys and three bays. The central doorway has pilasters on plinths, a fanlight, a frieze, and a cornice on four consoles. To its right is a casement window, above it are two blind windows, and all the other windows are sashes.	II
2–6 Millgate; 54.22181°N 1.65430°W		Early 19th century	A row of three cottages in stone with quoins and a stone slate roof. There are two storeys and three bays. On the front are three doorways, the windows in the left cottage are 20th-century casements, and the other windows are horizontally-sliding sashes.	II
8–12 Millgate; 54.22184°N 1.65409°W		Early 19th century	A row of three cottages in stone with a stone slate roof. There are two storeys and four bays. On the front are two doorways, and to the right is a carriage entrance. One of the windows is a casement, and the others are horizontally-sliding sashes.	II
21 Park Street; 54.22090°N 1.65786°W		Early 19th century	The house is in stone on a plinth, and has a stone slate roof with a shaped kneeler and stone coping on the right. In the centre is a doorway with a plain surround and a fanlight, and the windows are sashes with plain surrounds.	II
23 and 25 Park Street; 54.22080°N 1.65785°W		Early 19th century	A pair of stone houses with a stone slate roof. There are two storeys and three bays. The paired doorways are in the centre and have plain surrounds and divided fanlights, and the windows are sashes with plain surrounds.	II
42 and 46 Park Street; 54.22037°N 1.65802°W	—	Early 19th century	A pair of houses in stone, with quoins, and a stone slate roof with stone coping. There are two storeys, and each house has three bays. Both houses have a central doorway with a plain surround and a fanlight, above each doorway is a blind window, and the other windows are sashes with plain surrounds.	II
21–23 Silver Street; 54.22282°N 1.65702°W	—	Early 19th century	A house and shop in stone, with quoins, and a stone slate roof with shaped kneelers and stone coping. There are three storeys and three bays. In the centre is a doorway with a fanlight, and to its right is a 19th-century shopfront with pilasters, consoles, a frieze and a cornice. To the left and on the upper floors are sash windows; the windows above the doorway are blind. The doorway and windows have plain surrounds.	II
Bank Villa; 54.22418°N 1.65717°W		Early 19th century	The house is in stone, with chamfered quoins, a cornice, and a stone slate roof with kneelers and stone coping. There are two storeys and five bays. The central doorway has a fanlight in an architrave, and a cornice on consoles. Flanking the doorway are canted bay windows with friezes and cornices, and the upper floor contains sash windows with plain surrounds.	II
Bay Horse Inn; 54.22229°N 1.65672°W		Early 19th century	The public house is in rendered stone, and has a stone slate roof with shaped kneelers and stone coping. There are three storeys and three bays. Steps lead up to the central doorway, with pilasters on plinths, a frieze and a cornice on consoles. It is flanked by canted bay windows, and the upper stores contain sash windows in plain surrounds.	II
Crowham House; 54.22208°N 1.65693°W		Early 19th century	The house is in stone on a plinth, with a cornice, and a stone slate roof with a shaped kneeler and stone coping on the left. There are three storeys and three bays. The central doorway has pilasters on plinths, a fanlight, a frieze and a cornice. The middle window on the top floor is blind, and the others are sashes.	II
Silverdale; 54.22273°N 1.65697°W	—	Early 19th century	A house and shop on a corner site, in stone on a plinth, with quoins and a hipped stone slate roof. There are two storeys and a front of three bays. Steps with railings lead up to a central doorway with a chamfered architrave, a fanlight, a frieze and a cornice. To the right is a 19th-century shopfront with a frieze and a cornice, and the windows are sashes.	II
The Croft; 54.22128°N 1.65669°W		Early 19th century	A house in sandstone on a plinth, with quoins, and a stone slate roof with a shaped kneeler and stone coping on the right. In the left bay is a basket-arched carriageway with a keystone and wrought iron gates. The doorway has a plain surround, above it is a blind window, and the other windows are sashes with plain surrounds.	II
27 Park Street; 54.22071°N 1.65782°W		Early to mid-19th century	The house is in stone with a stone slate roof. There are two storeys and three bays. The central doorway has a plain surround and a fanlight, and all the windows are sashes.	II
Post Office House; 54.22301°N 1.65719°W	—	Early to mid-19th century	The house is in stone, with chamfered quoins, and a stone slate roof with shaped kneelers and stone coping. There are three storeys and three bays. In the right bay is a Doric porch with a frieze and a pediment. The windows on the ground and top floors are casements, and on the middle floor they are sashes.	II
Glebe House; 54.22040°N 1.65105°W	—	1839	The house is in stone, with a modillion cornice, overhanging eaves, and a hipped stone slate roof. There are two storeys and three bays. Steps lead up to the central doorway that has Doric pilasters, a frieze and a cornice. The windows are sashes in chamfered surrounds, and at the rear is a three-bay full-height bay window.	II
Former Fayre Enough restaurant 54.22232°N 1.65677°W		Mid-19th century	A house, later a restaurant, in stone, with quoins, and a Welsh slate roof with stone coping. On the ground floor is a 19th-century shopfront with pilasters, a frieze and a cornice, and to the left is a doorway with a fanlight. The middle floor contains canted bay windows with a frieze and a cornice, and on the top floor are sash windows.	II
Former mechanics' institute 54.22195°N 1.65813°W		1856	The mechanics' institute, later used for other purposes, is in limestone with sandstone dressings, on a plinth, with quoins, a floor band, a cornice on shaped consoles, a parapet with a central datestone, and a tile roof. There are two storeys, a front range of three bays and rear extensions. The central doorway has a segmental head and a cornice on paired consoles. The windows are paired sashes with aprons, those on the ground floor with segmental heads and keystones, and those on the upper floor with round heads.	II
Methodist Church; 54.22047°N 1.65880°W		c. 1890	The church is in stone, with quoins, a floor band, a dentilled cornice and a slate roof. The entrance front has two storeys and four bays. In the centre is a double portico containing two segmental arched openings with keystones, divided by a column, and surmounted by an openwork balustrade with corner finials. It is flanked by segmental-headed windows with an band, and on the upper floor are round-headed windows. The middle pair have two lights and are flanked by half-columns carrying a moulded cornice. The outer windows have one light and keystones, and at the top is a pediment containing a decorative feature.	II
Town Hall; 54.22210°N 1.65541°W		1912	The town hall is in stone, with quoins, sill bands, a floor band, a frieze, a cornice, a coped parapet, and a hipped Welsh slate roof. There are two storeys and seven bays. In the centre is a doorway with rusticated pilasters, a fanlight and a keystone. The windows are casements with rusticated moulded architraves, and shaped aprons, the upper floor windows also with friezes and pediments. On the roof is a square cupola with pilasters, segmental arches with keystones, a corbelled cornice and a dome.	II
Telephone kiosk 54.22211°N 1.65627°W		1935	The K6 type telephone kiosk was designed by Giles Gilbert Scott. Constructed in cast iron, it has a square plan and a dome, and there are three unperforated crowns in the top panels.	II
