= Church of St Mary the Virgin, Masham =

- St Mary the Virgin, Masham
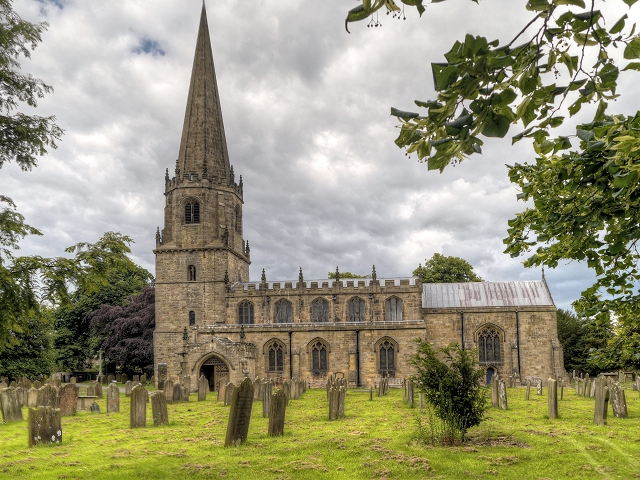
- The Church of Saint Mary the Virgin, Masham

- Location within North Yorkshire
- 54.2213°N 1.6537°W
- OS grid reference: SE 22674 80670
- Location: Masham, North Yorkshire
- Country: England
- Denomination: Church of England
- Website: Official webpage

History
- Dedication: St Mary the Virgin

Architecture
- Functional status: Active
- Architectural type: Perpendicular

Specifications
- Length: 100 feet (30 m)
- Width: 51 feet (16 m)

Administration
- Diocese: Leeds
- Archdeaconry: Richmond and Craven
- Deanery: Ripon
- Benefice: Masham and Healey
- Parish: Masham

Clergy
- Vicar: David John Cleeves

Listed Building – Grade II*
- Designated: 9 August 1966
- Reference no.: 1166880

The Church of St Mary the Virgin, Masham (also known as the Church of St Mary or St Mary's Church), is the parish church in the town of Masham, North Yorkshire, England. The church stands on the site of an Anglo-Saxon place of worship with some the original Saxon stones incorporated into the current church. Archaeology has determined that the site has been used as a place of Christian worship for over 1,400 years.

The Ecclesiastical Court in the town was previously a peculiar after it was given to the Diocese of York, but was deemed too dangerous and far away for the bishop or his tax collectors to travel to. All court affairs were presided over by the Peculier of Masham consisting of 24 men, known historically as the Four and Twenty. As it did not forward taxes to York, the court became quite rich, this led to some labelling it as the richest plum in Christendom.

The church sits at the south east corner of the market square in the town.

== History ==
The church stands on the site of a former Anglo-Saxon place of worship. A church is mentioned in the entry for the settlement in the Domesday Book when the lord of the manor was Gospatric, but it is not known exactly where it was sited and many have doubted that any part of the original church survives as part of the current architecture save for the odd stone in the church's walls. However, archaeological discoveries, most notably 57 Saxon bodies, have led to estimations that the site has been the place of Christian worship for over 1,400 years. (Note: In 1988, Yorkshire Water were laying a pipeline in the area and at least 57 skeletons were unearthed. They were dated to between 679 and 1011 AD and were all found a very short distance from the present church. The site of the bodies has now been marked with a plaque labelling it the Lost Graveyard. After a long evaluation by archaeologists, the bodies were re-interred in the present church's graveyard in 2009. Studies revealed that all the bodies were facing east (as per the early Christian tradition) and that they had not died as a result of battle or disease.) The church itself was started in the 12th century with additions in the 14th, 16th and 19th centuries. The restoration of the church between 1855 and 1863 was down to Octavius Vernon Harcourt who had married the widow of William Danby in 1823. The church was restored after lightning struck the tower in July 1855. During the 19th century renovations, several carved stones of Anglo-Saxon origin were found to be embedded within the church walls with more being unearthed when the foundations were maintained. It was grade II* listed in 1966.

The presence of the church is reflected in the name of the town; according to some sources Masham derives from Mass-Town as the presence of a church meant that that is where people travelled to worship. It was made a prebend of the Church of St Peter in York (York Minster) between 1154 and 1181 and its considerable distance meant that clergy from York could not travel to the town easily. It was therefore granted the right to be a Peculier, which has also influenced the name of a beer that is brewed in the town.

The church consists of a vaulted south porch, nave, chapel and chancel, with two aisles (north and south) and a tower. The length of the church is roughly 100 feet (30 m) with 51 feet (16 m) in width at its widest point.

The chancel contains a monument to Sir Marmaduke Wyvil (of Burton-on-Ure) and the south aisle contains many memorials to the Danby family from nearby Swinton. During the reformation, the rood-screen, decorations on the altar-rails and some off the stained glass was removed due to the puritanical considerations of the time. Most of the church is to be found in the Perpendicular style, however, some of the stained glass windows on the south side are in the Decorated style. In comparison to the rest of the church, the font is relatively new having been gifted to the church by the reverend Morton in 1862. The font is constructed of Caen stone with various religious symbols and people carved into the eight panels that flank the font.

The tower, which stands at the west side of the church, is Norman in its lower three stages and is believed to have been erected in the 12th century. This three tiered structure had bell openings in them. In either the 14th or 15th century, an octagonal section was added and a spire placed on the top of that. A clock was affixed to the outer wall of the spire (previously it had been inside the bell tower) in 1732. The Four and Twenty from the Peculier of Masham dictated that the face should be there as it would be "commodious and of great use to the inhabitants of the town and the people resorting to the market and fair, but also the country generally". The nave is separated from the north aisle by six bays and the south aisle has five. At the same time that the tower was amended in the 15th century, the clerestory was added.

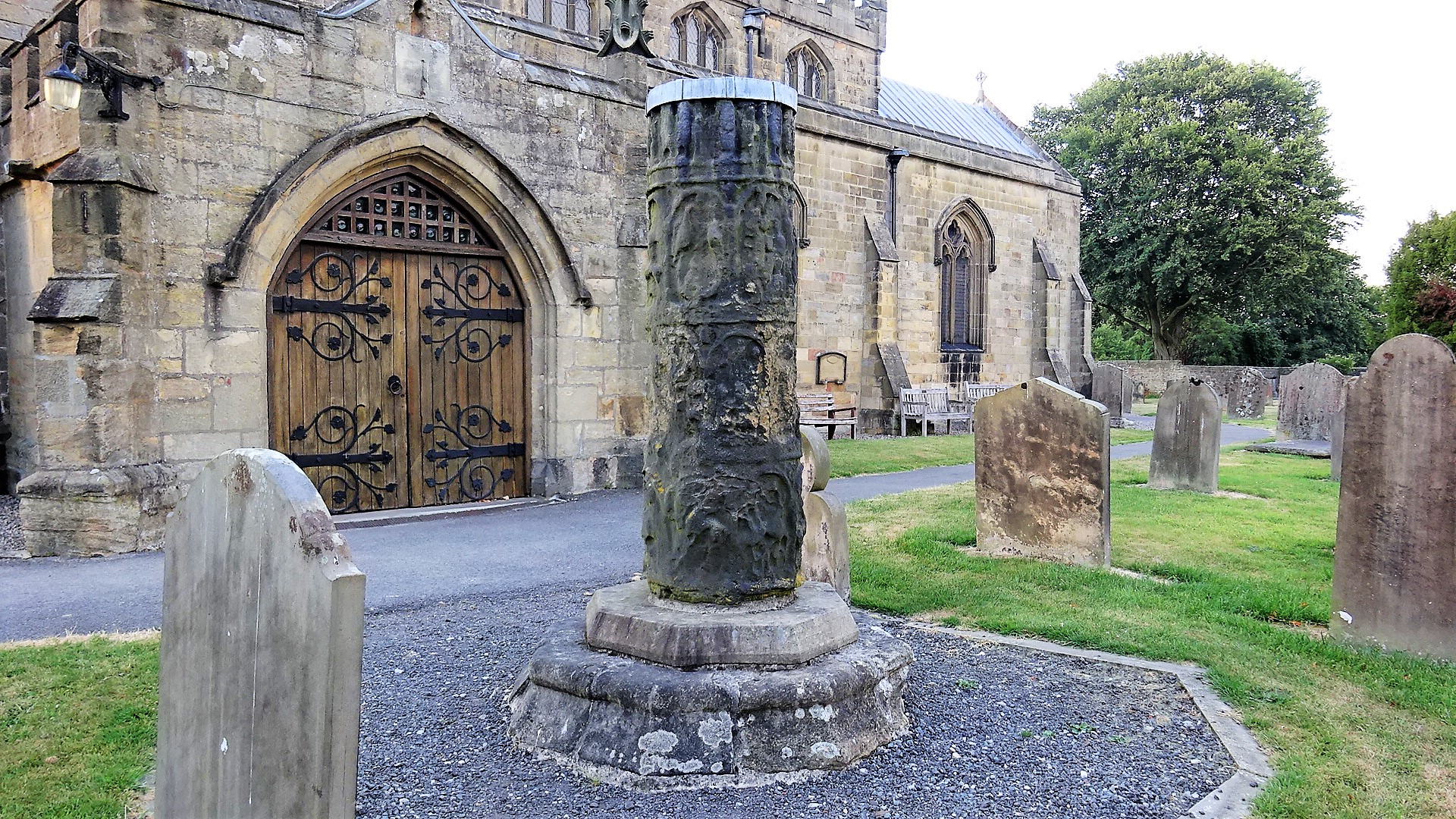
Anglo-Saxon Cross Shaft, St Mary's the Virgin Church, Masham. View from the west

Whilst the church itself is Norman and medieval, the stone cross that is just outside the porch is of Anglo-Saxon origin. It is believed to have been carved in the 8th or 9th centuries and to have been dedicated to St Wilfrid, who was Bishop of Ripon between 667 and 669. The cross, which is 6 feet 9 inches (2.06 m) tall and 2 feet 0 inches (0.6 m) in diameter, used to be known as the Paulinus Cross and is decorated with early Christian carvings. Many of the carvings and representations have weathered over time, though Fisher argues that some were probably removed by those with Puritanical leanings during the Reformation. It is similar to the types of crosses found in churchyards in Wolverhampton and Dewsbury. The cross was grade II listed in 1966. The church is located on the south eastern corner of the market square in Masham town centre, though the entrance faces south with views of the countryside in that direction.

Simon Jenkins in his book, England's Thousand Best Churches, awards the church and its churchyard one star out of five and describes the Anglo-Saxon cross as being

..an eerie piece of archaeology rising out of a refreshingly unkempt churchyard.

In January 2017, the church was used as the setting for an episode of the BBC TV series Strike. One of the main characters hails from Masham and is seen getting married in the church.

== The Peculier of Masham ==
Roger de Mowbray, the lord of the manor, was held captive during the Crusades and released after being ransomed by the Knights Templar. In gratitude, he donated the church to the Church of St Peter in York. (Note: This is the second time that de Mowbray had fought in the crusades, but most scholars agree that he died soon after being freed and was buried at Tyre. de Mowbray is said to have donated Masham church to York in the 1150s or 1160s which would mean it was after his first Crusade. Another possibility is that his son, also called Roger de Mowbray, donated it after his father's release and the two figures have become confused.) However, because of its distance from York, the threat of the church's tax collectors being mugged on the long route between the two places and the extra burden of having to govern it, the Archbishop declared that the town of Masham, through its church, was granted the right to govern its own affairs. The term Peculier, which derives from a Norman word, in this aspect actually means particular not odd as in the term peculiar.

As a result of this, the Peculier Court of Masham, consisted of 24 men (known historically as the Four and Twenty) which also gave rise to a name of one of the Theakstons' beers. The court is presided over by the incumbent of the church, and still has the right to rule on matters such as

drunkenness, brawling, swearing, scolding, not bringing your children to be baptised, bidding church wardens to do their worst when they order you to church and carrying a skull out of a churchyard to lay under a person’s head to charm him or her to sleep.

Between the 12th and 19th centuries, the court ruled on matters mostly pertaining to the church and adherence to Christian rituals not only in Masham, but also in the surrounding areas. People were fined for having non-Christian customs in burials, for not paying money into the collection plate, for wearing hats during communion and for setting up a school without permission. One man from nearby Ellington was excommunicated for not providing bread and water for a village walk. Others were punished for being Catholics or Recusants. Through not having to pay taxes to York, the court became quite rich and the power of its earning potential and endowments was renowned across the north of England. This gave rise to a saying the Peculier of Masham was the richest plum in Christendom.

When the Theakston Brewery was formed in the town, their first beer, brewed in 1827, was called Old Peculier. In 1999, the brewery paid for a new stained glass window in the church that showed the seal of the Peculier of Masham (believed to be the figure of Roger de Mowbray) which Theakstons had borrowed for the design of their beer.

A contract is signed between the incumbent of the church and Theakston Brewery to allow the use of the Peculier seal on their products. It was re-signed most recently in 1989 between the Reverend Brian Abell and Michael Theakston. Theakston also commissioned a new portrait of the Virgin Mary and the Baby Jesus as part of the deal that extends the licence of the seal until 2040.

== See also ==
- Grade II* listed churches in North Yorkshire (district)
- Listed buildings in Masham
