= Listed buildings in Burton-on-Yore =

Burton-on-Yore is a civil parish in the county of North Yorkshire, England. It contains ten listed buildings that are recorded in the National Heritage List for England. Of these, four are listed at Grade II*, the middle of the three grades, and the others are at Grade II, the lowest grade. The parish does not contain any settlements, and the listed buildings consist of houses, farmhouses and associated structures.

== Key ==
Grade	Criteria
II*	Particularly important buildings of more than special interest
II	Buildings of national importance and special interest

== Buildings ==
Name and location	Photograph	Date	Notes	Grade
Low Burton Hall; 54.22763°N 1.64284°W	—	15th century	The house, which has been altered, is in stone, and has a stone slate roof with stone coping. There are two storeys and a T-shaped plan, with a cross-wing on the left. The central doorway has a triangular head, a moulded lintel and a hood mould. It is flanked by chamfered mullioned windows with hood moulds, and in the upper floor most of the windows have round-arched heads and hood moulds. The wing has a large external chimney stack with a chamfered band and an embattled top, and at the rear is a re-set 13th-century window.	II
Coach house with bee hives north of Nutwith Cote; 54.20623°N 1.64698°W		16th century	The coach house, which dates from the 18th century, is in stone, with quoins, an eaves band, and a stone roof with stone coping. There is a single storey and a single bay. It contains an arched entrance with rusticated voussoirs and a keystone. Above, in the gable, is an arched opening with a keystone. To the right is a range of six 16th-century arched bee hives with moulded surrounds and semicircular apses.	II*
Nutwith Cote; 54.20587°N 1.64704°W		17th century	Originally a grange of Fountains Abbey, later a farmhouse, it is in stone, with a moulded cornice, a coped parapet, and a stone slate roof with stone coping and shaped kneelers. The main range dates from the 18th century, and has two storeys and a cellar, and four bays. The central doorway has an architrave, a pulvinated frieze and a pediment, and above it is a sundial. The windows on the front are sashes with plain surrounds and moulded sills. To the right and lower is the 17th-century wing, which contains two windows, one with a chamfered surround and above one with a moulded architrave.	II*
Outbuilding north of Nutwith Cote; 54.20648°N 1.64708°W		Early 18th century	The outbuilding is in stone with chamfered quoins and a corrugated asbestos roof. There are two storeys and seven bays. On the front are three doorways with chamfered quoined surrounds and tripartite keystones. The windows are casements with projecting plain stone surrounds and tripartite keystones.	II*
Barn south of Nutwith Cote; 54.20448°N 1.64737°W	—	Early to mid 18th century	The barn is in stone, and has a stone slate roof with moulded kneelers and stone coping. There is a single storey and three bays. In the centre is an arched wagon entrance with moulded imposts, voussoirs and a keystone. This is flanked by two giant Doric pilasters on plinths, carrying an entablature with a band, a frieze and a moulded cornice. In each outer bay is a doorway with a square opening above.	II*
Dovecote south of Nutwith Cote; 54.20404°N 1.64699°W		Early to mid 18th century	The dovecote, which is now a ruin, is in stone, with quoins and a coved cornice. It contains a doorway with a lintel, and above it is a partially ruined oval window.	II
Aldburgh Hall; 54.20738°N 1.64101°W	—	18th century	The house, which was refronted in the 19th century, is in rendered stone, on a plinth, with a hipped stone slate roof. There are two storeys, a main range of five bays, and projecting two-bay wings. The central doorway has Doric pilasters, a fanlight, a frieze, a cornice and a blocking course. The windows are sashes, tripartite in the outer bays, in moulded architraves.	II
South Cote Farmhouse; 54.19943°N 1.63525°W	—	Mid to late 18th century	The farmhouse is in stone with a roof of concrete slate. There are two storeys and four bays. The doorway has a plain surround, the ground floor windows are casements, and in the upper floor are horizontally-sliding sashes.	II
Stables west of Aldburgh Hall; 54.20745°N 1.64257°W	—	Late 18th century	The stables are in stone and have hipped stone slate roofs, and an L-shaped plan. The main range has six bays, the middle two bays project and have two storeys and a pyramidal roof, and the outer bays have a single storey. The projecting north wing has two storeys and five bays. The carriage entrances, doorways and windows, which are sashes, have round-arched heads, imposts and keystones.	II
Burton House; 54.23139°N 1.65508°W	—	Early 19th century	The house is in stone with a stone slate roof, two storeys and five bays. In the fourth bay, steps lead up to a Doric porch, flanked by square bay windows with friezes and dentilled cornices. The other windows are sashes with incised voussoirs. In the left return is a pediment-like gable containing a lunette window, and at the rear is a basket-arched stair window.	II
