= Burton-on-Yore =

Civil parish in North Yorkshire, England

Coordinates: 54.221°N 1.636°W

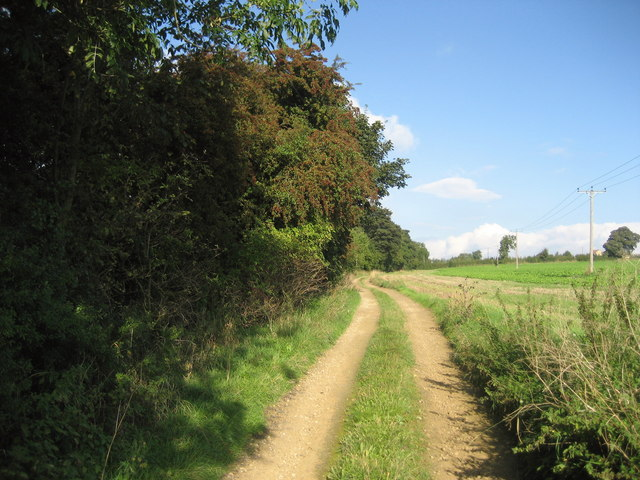
- Lane beside Low Burton Wood

- Location within North Yorkshire
- Population: 80 (2012 estimate)
- Civil parish: Burton-on-Yore
- Unitary authority: North Yorkshire
- Ceremonial county: North Yorkshire
- Region: Yorkshire and the Humber
- Country: England
- Sovereign state: United Kingdom
- Police: North Yorkshire
- Fire: North Yorkshire
- Ambulance: Yorkshire

Burton-on-Yore (historically also Burton upon Ure) is a civil parish in the county of North Yorkshire, England, facing Masham across the River Ure (historically the River Yore). There is no village in the parish, but there are two hamlets, Low Burton (or Little Burton) and High Burton (or Great Burton). The parish also includes Nutwith Cote on the west bank of the Ure, between Masham and Grewelthorpe. The population of the parish was estimated at 80 in 2012.

Low Burton was the location of Masham railway station from 1875 to 1963. Low Burton Hall dates back to the 15th century. It was the 15th century home of the Wyvill family, before they became lords of Constable Burton.

Nutwith Cote was a grange of Fountains Abbey. The present farmhouse dates from the 17th century, and is a Grade II* listed building.

Burton-on-Yore was historically a township in the ancient parish of Masham in the North Riding of Yorkshire. It became a separate civil parish in 1866. In 1974 the parish was transferred to the new county of North Yorkshire. The parish now shares a grouped parish council, known as Masham Parish Council, with Masham, Swinton with Warthermarske and Ellington High and Low. From 1974 to 2023 it was part of the Borough of Harrogate, it is now administered by the unitary North Yorkshire Council.

== See also ==
- Listed buildings in Burton-on-Yore
