= Black Sheep Brewery =

Brewery in Masham, North Yorkshire, England

Coordinates: 54.2252°N 1.6582°W

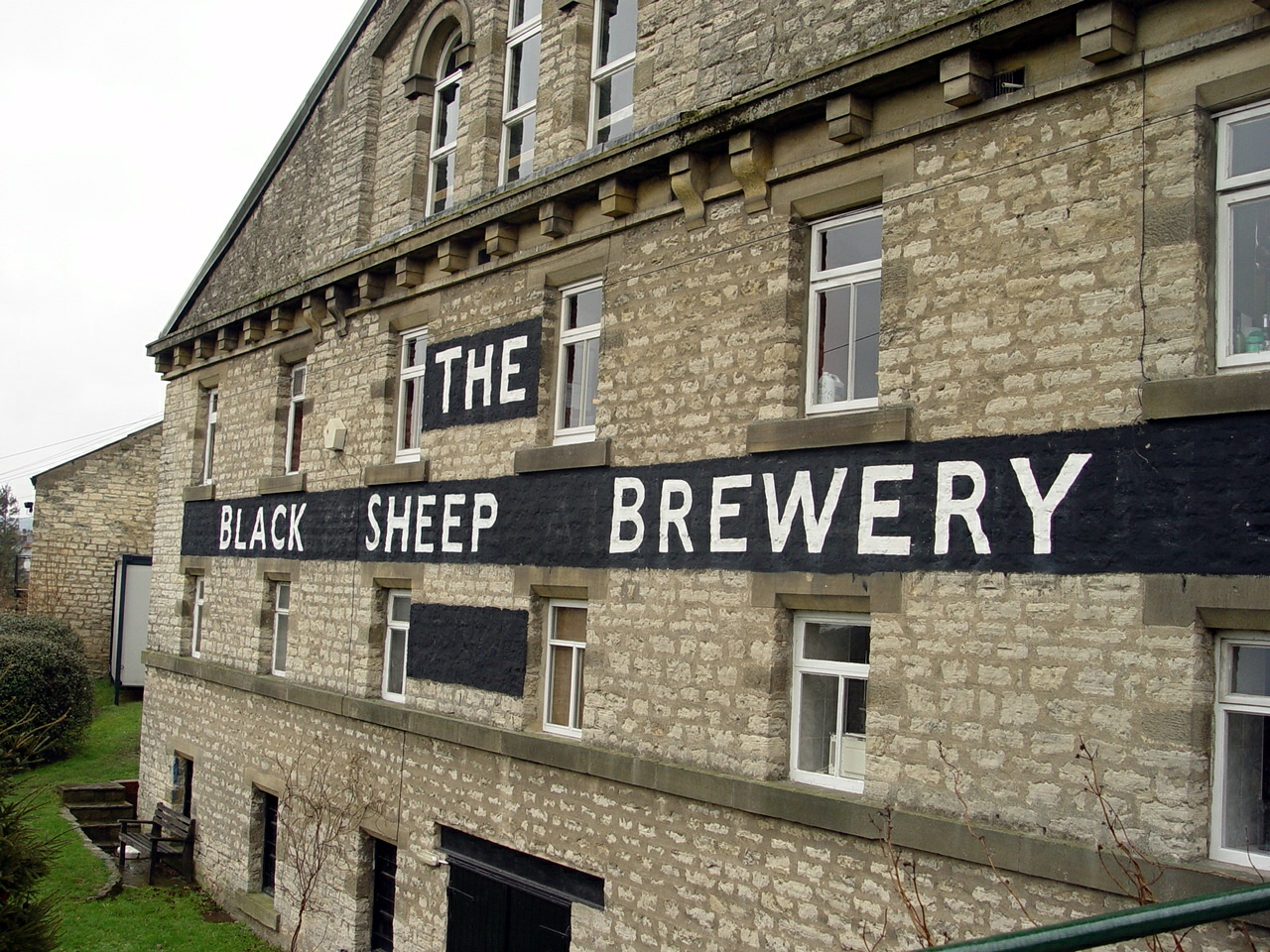
- The Brewery, in Masham, North Yorkshire
- Company type: plc (over 1,000 shareholders)
- Industry: Alcoholic beverage
- Founded: 1992
- Founder: Paul Theakston
- Headquarters: Masham, North Yorkshire, England
- Products: Beer
- Production output: 70,000 barrels
- Website: www.blacksheepbrewery.co.uk

The Black Sheep Brewery is a brewery in Masham, North Yorkshire, England.

== History ==
The Black Sheep Brewery was established by Paul Theakston in 1991. Following a successful launch as a Business Expansion Scheme, it became a public limited company (plc) in 1992. Theakston had been managing director of Theakston Brewery, also in Masham, since 1968. He began at the age of 23, taking over from his father, Frank Theakston.

The Theakston Brewery was acquired by Matthew Brown in 1984 following disagreements between members of the family and other shareholders. Scottish & Newcastle acquired Matthew Brown in 1987. Theakston left in 1988, and after a hiatus of more than a year purchased the North Yorkshire Malt Roasting Company, originally part of the former Lightfoot's brewery site, from an animal feed company, in order to start a new brewery in Masham.

Theakston wanted to use the Lightfoot name to bring back an old brewing tradition, but Scottish and Newcastle had already trademarked the name. The association of Masham with sheep led Theakston to come up with the name "Sheep Brewery" which became "Black Sheep" at his wife's suggestion. Much of the original brewing equipment came from the former Hartley's Brewery in Cumbria, whilst the slate Yorkshire squares and the yeast strain, in use since at least the early 1920s, came from the recently closed Hardys & Hansons brewery in Nottingham.

== Production ==
Black Sheep Best Bitter was first sold at the Bruce Arms in Masham.

The brewery produces a range of well-hopped bitters, to distinguish itself from Theakston's range of fruity and yeasty beers. The brewery quickly became successful, and now produces over 75,000 barrels a year.

In 2008, the brewery launched Draught Golden Sheep, a blonde cask beer with a citrus-hop flavour. It remains a seasonal brew. This, like all Black Sheep beers and indeed the brewing plant itself was created by Paul Ambler, Head Brewer since 1992 and later Operations Director. Paul Ambler has now retired. Comments Paul Theakston, "Over the years, Paul Ambler has been a fierce champion of the quality of our beer, which is the keystone of our success". Nevertheless, a growing share of its sales is in on-cask form.

All bottled beers brewed by the Black Sheep Brewery are suitable for both vegetarians and vegans.

== Finance ==
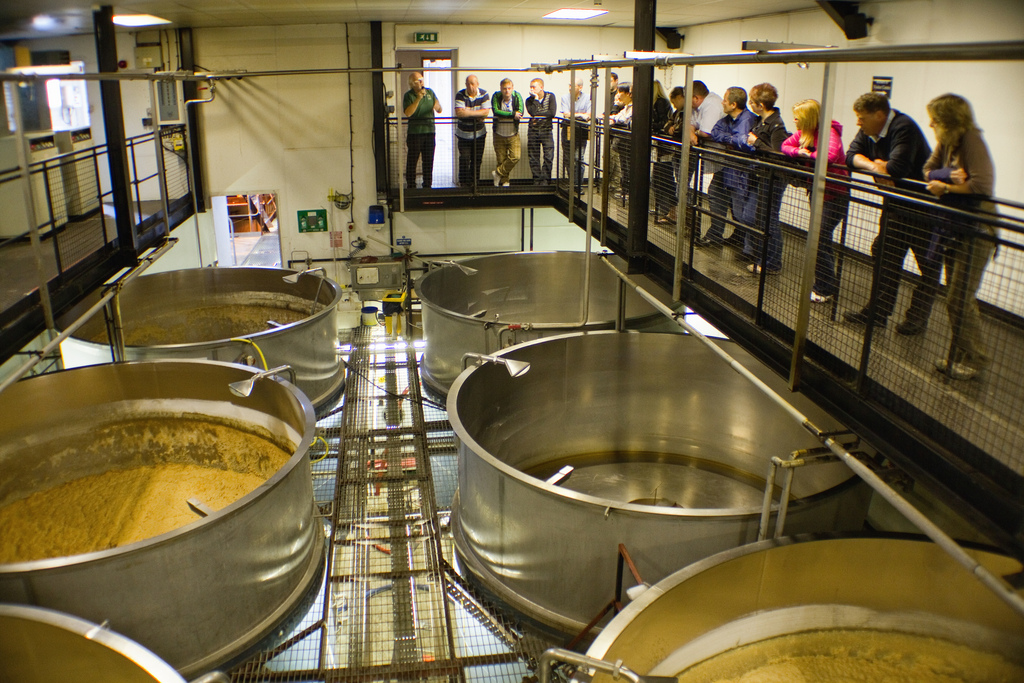
A group of visitors observes fermentation vats whilst on an official tour of the brewery facilities

The brewery has capitalised on its popularity by converting unused parts of the original maltings into a visitors centre from which tours of the brewery are conducted. In 1996, it served as host to an episode of the Two Fat Ladies cooking programme which was broadcast the following year.

For the first 15 years it paid its shareholders, including many real ale enthusiasts, steadily rising dividends. However it was forced to retrench, and paid no dividend for several years. It was one of the largest shareholdings of the CAMRA Members' Investment Club.

On 2 May 2023 the company announced that it was to go into administration as it lacked the cashflow needed to survive increased costs since the COVID pandemic.

On 26 May 2023 Black Sheep was bought out of administration by London based investor Breal Group (now Keystone Brewing Group) with an expectation that it would continue to produce Black Sheep beers and protect jobs.

== Cask beers ==
- Special Ale, 4.4% (Sold as Black Sheep Ale in bottles)
- Best Bitter, 3.8%. The brewery's best-known product, available at a large number of pubs in the UK.
- Riggwelter, 5.9%
- Black Sheep Blonde, 3.7%
- Respire, Fresh Session IPA, 4.0%

According to the website, "...Riggwelter takes its name from the local Yorkshire Dales dialect – when a sheep is on its back and can't get up without help, local dialect says it is riggwelted. This dialect word comes from the old Viking words: 'rigg'(rygg) meaning back and 'velte' to overturn (the words and their meaning are still largely the same in the modern North Germanic languages). Riggwelter is also popular in Sweden, being in the top 20 of bottled ales sold in that country.

== Bottled beers ==
- Black Sheep Ale (formerly Special Ale in cask form), 4.4%
- The Monty Python "Trilogy":
  - Monty Python's Holy Grail Ale, 4.7% – a golden ale
  - Monty Python's Flying Circus, 4.5% – an IPA
  - Brian, 3.9% – a pale ale
- Riggwelter, 5.7%
- Golden Sheep, 4.7% – originally produced specially for Tesco, as part of their "Finest" range
- Yorkshire Square Ale, 5.0% – named after a particular fermentation system originated over 200 years ago using double decked vessels called "squares" made of slate or stone. The brewery stopped using the slate squares 10 years ago and replaced them with modern stainless steel round equivalents. The label's distinctive square sheep icon and sunset background was designed by Middlesbrough born artist Mackenzie Thorpe.
- Imperial Russian, 8.5% – special brew porter
- All Creatures "Bright and Beautiful", 4.0% – brewed in celebration of the famous veterinary character James Herriot
- Velo, 4.2% – Originally brewed in 2014 to celebrate the Grand Départ of the Tour de France in Yorkshire, which passed the gates of the brewery
