= Theakston Brewery =

Brewery in Masham, North Yorkshire, England

T&R Theakston is a British brewery in Masham, North Yorkshire and the sixteenth largest brewer in the United Kingdom by market share. It is the second largest under family ownership, after Shepherd Neame, and is known for its Old Peculier beer.

The brewery is one of the few remaining in the UK to have an in-house cooperage.

== History ==
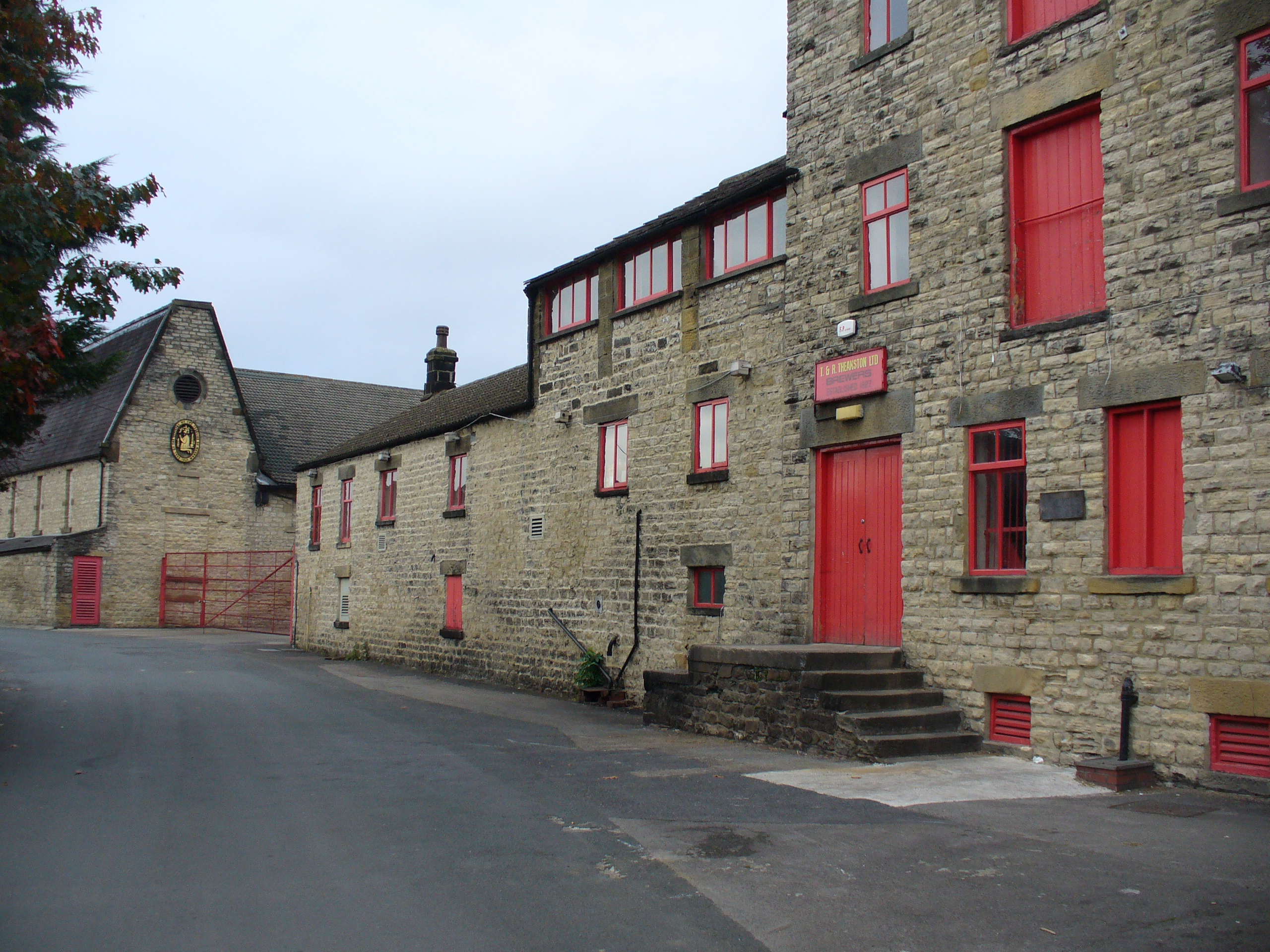
The Theakston's Brewery in Masham

The business was founded in 1827 by Robert Theakston and John Wood at the Black Bull pub and brewhouse in College Lane, Masham. By 1832, Theakston had sole ownership of the brewery and in 1875 he passed control over to his sons Thomas and Robert. They formed the T&R Theakston partnership and constructed a new brewery on Paradise Fields, near the original site.

In 1919, the company acquired the Lightfoot Brewery, also in Masham, now home to The White Bear.

The business grew in North Yorkshire and benefitted from renewed interest in cask ale in the 1960s. To meet growing demand T&R Theakston bought the UK Government owned Carlisle State Management Brewery. The transaction put financial strain on the business which was taken over in 1987 by Blackburn based brewer, Matthew Brown & Co Ltd. Matthew Brown was itself taken over by Scottish & Newcastle the same year.

Following these transactions, the brewing of some Theakston beers, including Theakston Best Bitter, was transferred to Scottish & Newcastle's Tyne Brewery.

In 2003, Simon Theakston and three of his brothers purchased a majority shareholding back from Scottish & Newcastle.

== Beers ==
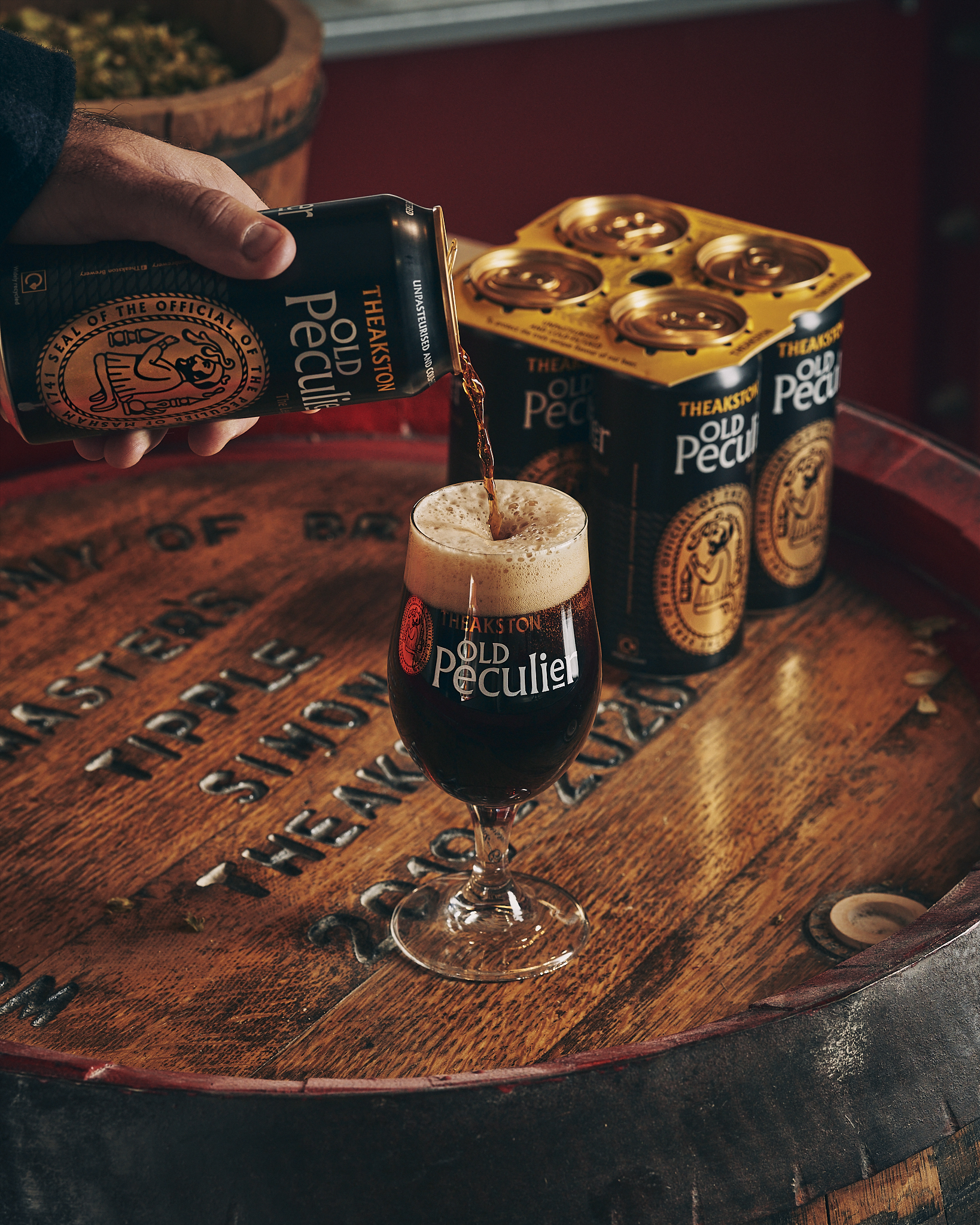
Theakston Old Peculier

The company produces cask and bottled ales. Theakston cask ales are widely available in pubs in the north of England, though are less common in other parts of the country. The bottled beers are distributed to British supermarkets and exported.

The company produces eight permanent beers and a range of seasonal ales. The permanent ales are:

Summit (4.2% ABV) - A cask-conditioned pale ale

Barista Stout (4.2% ABV) - A nitrogen infused, coffee flavoured stout

Pale (4.5% ABV) – A hoppy, cold filtered and unpasteurised pale ale

Best Bitter (3.8% ABV) was awarded First Prize in the 1910 London Brewers Exhibition.

XB (4.5% ABV) - A stronger bitter

Mild (3.5% ABV) - A dry Dark Mild

Lightfoot (4.1% ABV) - Golden in colour and bitter in taste

Old Peculier (5.6% ABV) - An old ale made under this name since the early 1800s. In 1989, the cask version of Old Peculier was voted Champion Strong Ale of Britain at the Great British Beer Festival. In 2000, the beer won the silver medal in the Campaign for Real Ale’s Champion Winter Beer of Britain competition. It was voted Champion of Champions in the 2007 Yorkshire Beer Championship. It is named after the Peculier of Masham, a peculier being a parish outside the jurisdiction of a diocese. In 1985, The Economist dubbed it the "doyen of real ales".

In 2022, Theakston launched Paradise Gold Dry Vintage Cider (6.8% ABV).

Brennan's Irish Stout (4.1% ABV) - a classic award winning smooth Irish stout in partnership with the Brennan family from County Wexford, Ireland

== Theakston Cooperage ==
Theakston has one of the last remaining full-time brewery coopers in the country. Euan Findlay makes oak casks for Old Peculier beer.

A cooper’s apprenticeship lasts four years and is marked by a ‘Trussing-In’ ceremony on completion. Euan’s ceremony in October 2021 was the first held in over 20 years.

== Theakston Old Peculier Crime Writing Festival ==
In 2004, Theakston became inaugural title sponsor of the Old Peculier Crime Writing Festival and sponsors of the Theakston's Old Peculier Crime Novel of the Year Award.

The Harrogate event is held in July and has welcomed John Grisham, Lee Child, Michael Connelly, PD James, Ruth Rendell, Colin Dexter, Reginald Hill, Val McDermid, Kathy Reichs, Jed Mercurio and Lynda La Plante.

== See also ==
- British regional breweries using wooden casks
