= Masham =

Market town in North Yorkshire, England

Coordinates: 54°13′20″N 1°39′32″W

- Town
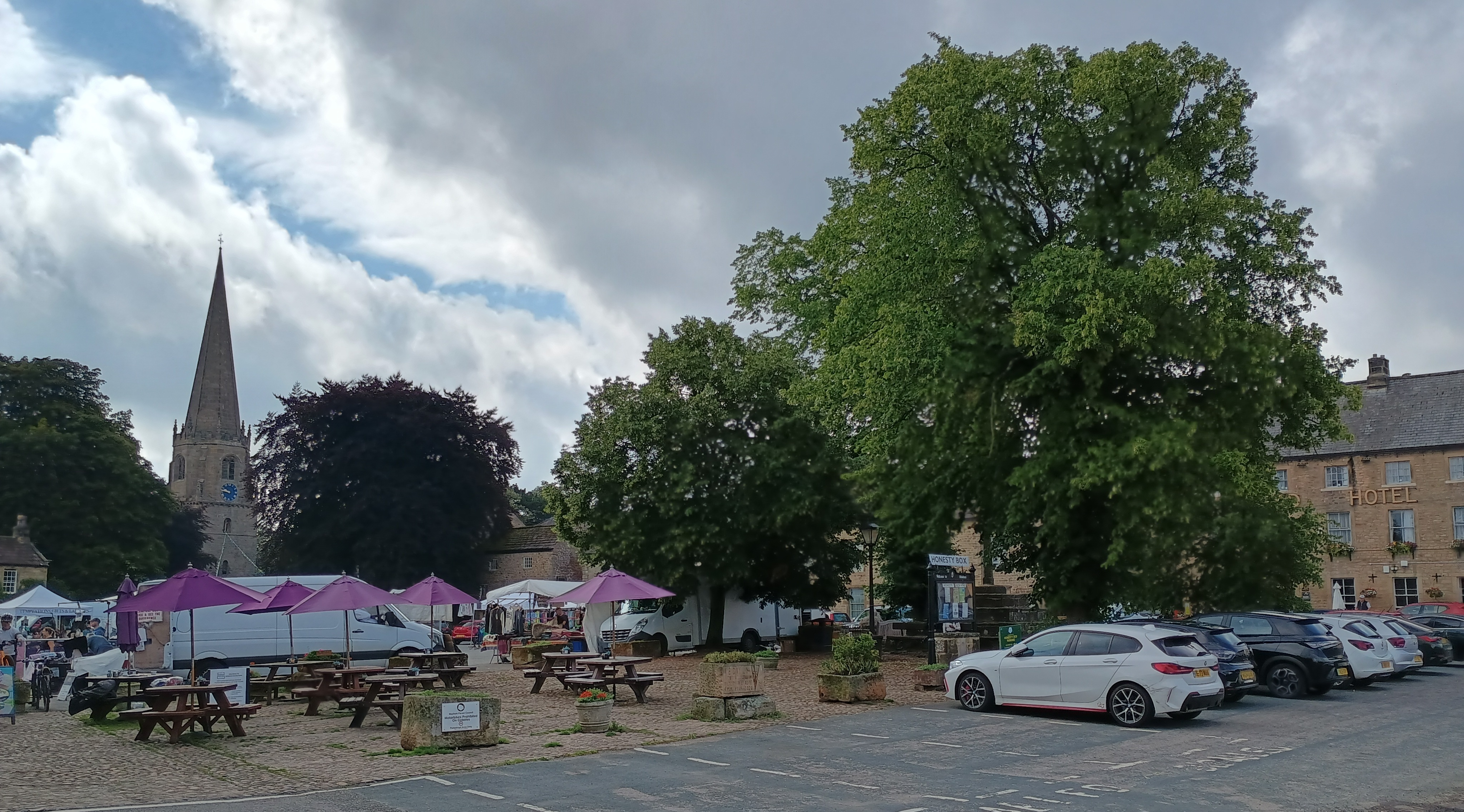
- Market Place

- Location within North Yorkshire
- Population: 1,205 (2011 census)
- OS grid reference: SE225808
  - London: 195 mi (314 km) SSE
- Civil parish: Masham
- Unitary authority: North Yorkshire
- Ceremonial county: North Yorkshire
- Region: Yorkshire and the Humber
- Country: England
- Sovereign state: United Kingdom
- Post town: RIPON
- Postcode district: HG4
- Dialling code: 01765
- Police: North Yorkshire
- Fire: North Yorkshire
- Ambulance: Yorkshire
- UK Parliament: Skipton and Ripon

Masham (/ˈmæsəm/ MASS-əm) is a market town and civil parish in North Yorkshire, England. It had a population of 1,205 at the 2011 census.

The town is located 34 miles (55 km) northwest of York and was in the former Harrogate district. It is situated in the lower Wensleydale, on the western bank of the River Ure, just north of its confluence with the River Burn.

== Etymology ==
The name derives from the Anglo-Saxon "Mæssa's Ham", the homestead belonging to Mæssa.

== History ==
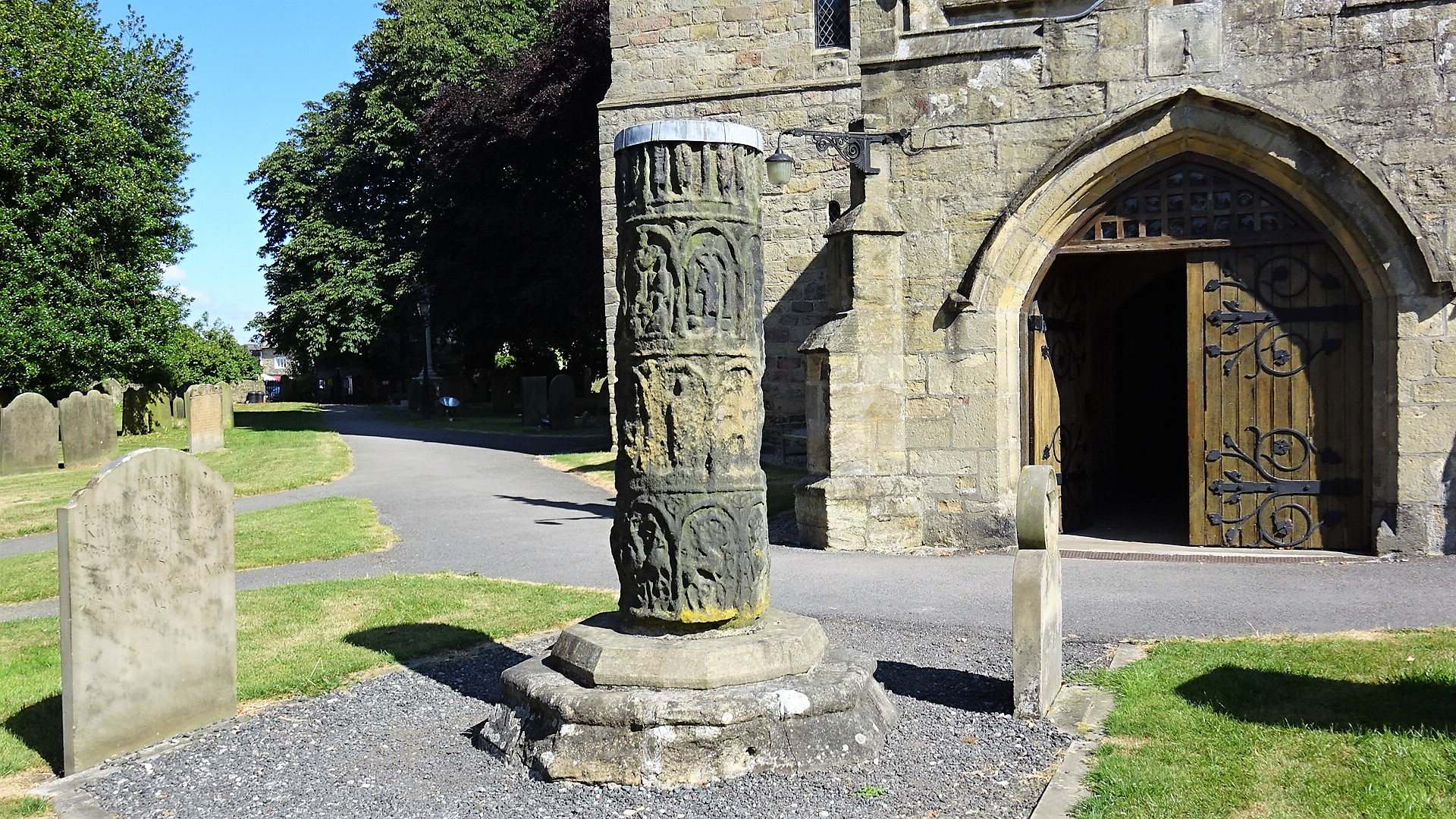
The remains of a 9th century cross in the churchyard; this and the Market Cross are the town's two scheduled monuments.

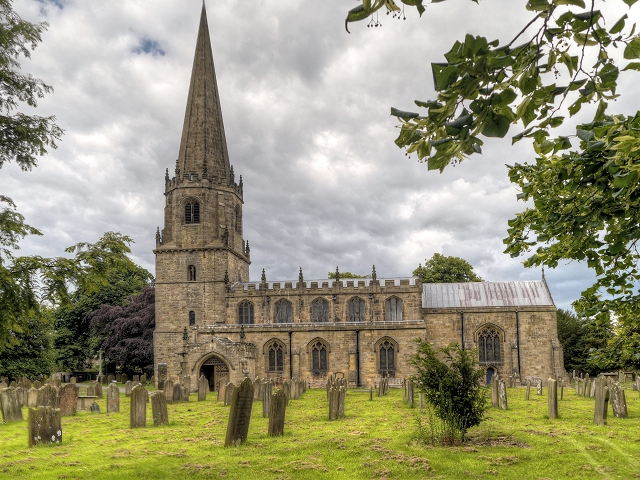
St Mary the Virgin church

The Romans had a presence here, but the first permanent settlers were the Angles. Around 900 AD the Vikings invaded, burning and laying waste to the church. They also introduced sheep farming, for which the town is still known.

Masham was historically a large parish in the North Riding of Yorkshire. As well as the town of Masham the parish included the townships of Burton-on-Yore, Ellingstring, Ellington High and Low, Fearby, Healey with Sutton, Ilton cum Pott and Swinton. In 1866 the townships became separate civil parishes. Masham Moor was an area of moorland to the west of the parish bordering the West Riding, common to the parishes of Masham and East Witton. It was divided between the parishes of Healey, Ilton cum Pott and Colsterdale in 1934.

The area of the ancient parish, except Burton-on-Yore, was known as Mashamshire from the 12th century or earlier.

St Mary's Church was most likely founded in the seventh century and stood somewhere near the present town hall on what used to be known as Cockpit Hill. The graveyard yielded 36 burials in a recent excavation. The present church – while having some Anglo-Saxon stonework and the stump of an eighth-century prayer cross – is mainly Norman with fifteenth-century additions. Masham was given to York Minster in the medieval period but, as the archbishop did not wish to make the long journey north to oversee the town's affairs, the parish was designated a peculiar.

During the Middle Ages, Masham developed as a small town with milling, mining, cloth making and tanning industries. The town received its first market charter in 1251. Masham's importance as a major sheep market is the reason for the large market place and its Georgian houses. The market originally thrived because of its nearness to Jervaulx and Fountains Abbeys, with their large flocks of sheep.

From 1875 the town was served by the Masham branch of the North Eastern Railway. Passenger services were stopped in December 1930, with goods traffic continuing until 1963. The station was across the River Ure at Low Burton.

The naturalist Charles Hedley (1862–1926) was born in Masham, where his father, the Rev. Canon Thomas Hedley, was vicar.

On 5 July 2014 the Tour de France Stage 1 from Leeds to Harrogate passed through the town.

== Governance ==
Prior to local government reform in North Yorkshire in 2023, the town lay within the Borough of Harrogate. Masham was part of that borough's electoral ward of Mashamshire. This ward stretched west to Colsterdale with a total population taken at the 2011 census of 2,350. Since 2023, the town is covered by North Yorkshire Council, a unitary authority.

As of 2025, the parish shares a grouped parish council, called Masham Parish Council, with Burton-on-Yore, Ellington High and Low, and Swinton with Warthermarske.

== Community ==
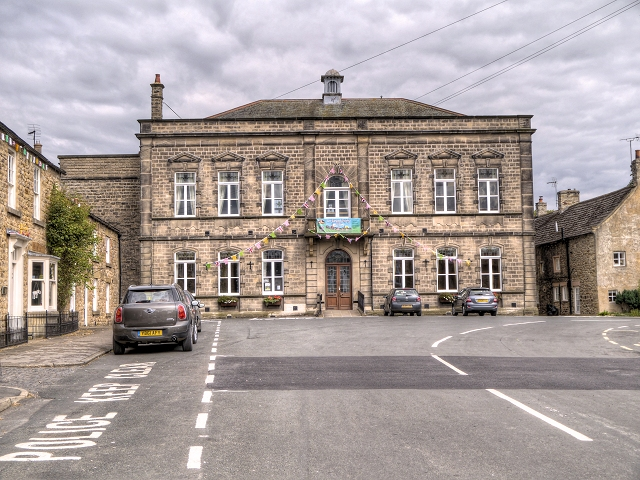
Masham Town Hall

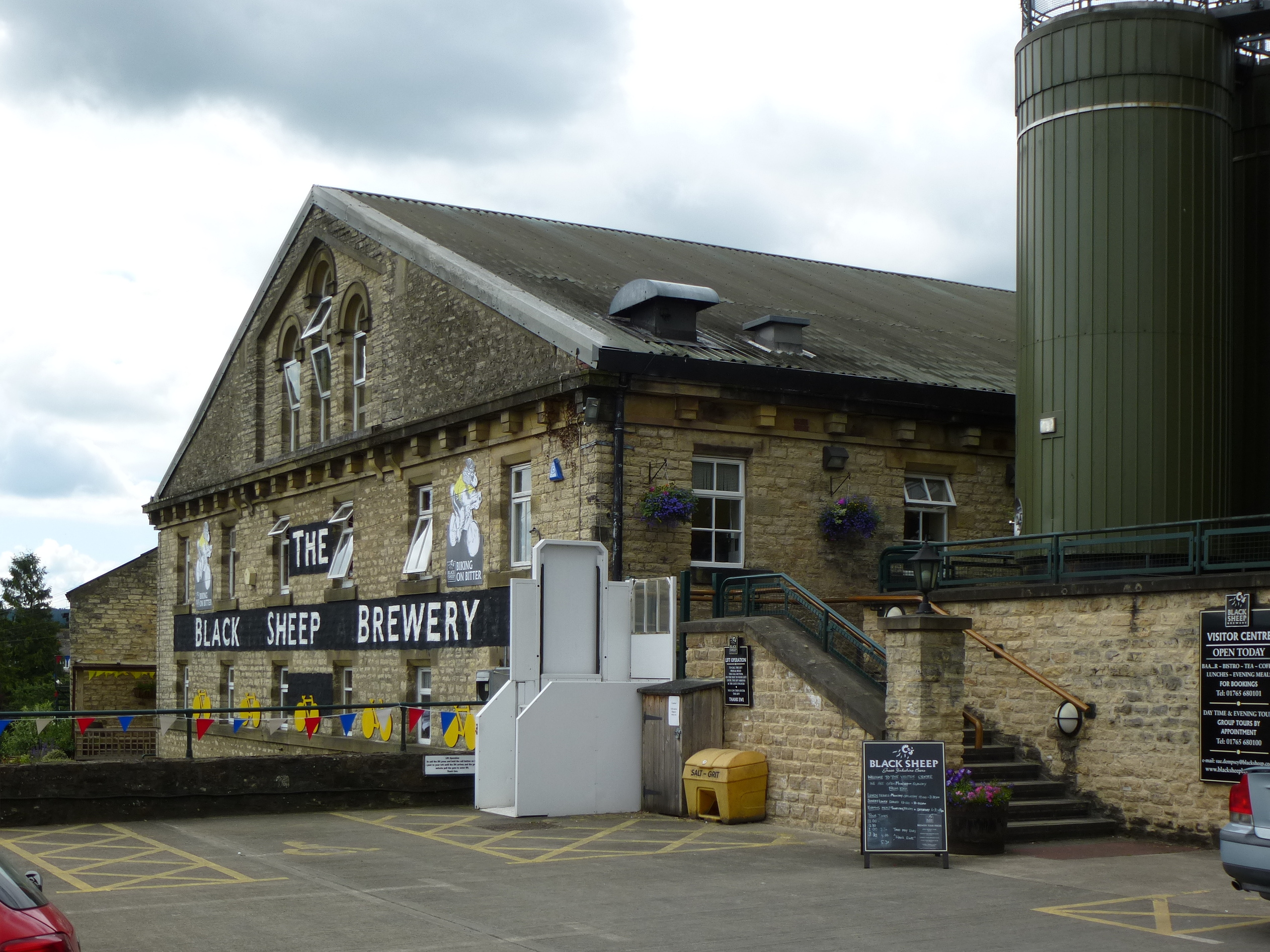
Black Sheep Brewery

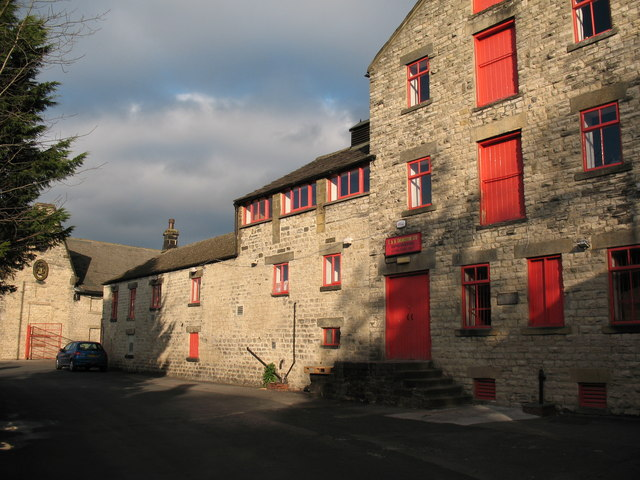
Theakston Brewery

Masham market days are Wednesday, Saturday and Bank Holiday Monday with a Farmers' Market every first Sunday of the month from April to September. An annual Sheep Fair is held in September, and the Masham breed is named after the town. The market place, the largest in the district, is tightly bordered on its south and west sides by ranges of two- and three-storey buildings. To the south-east, lies St. Mary's Church with its large graveyard.

Although Masham is a relatively small town it has two working breweries, Black Sheep Brewery and Theakstons, situated only a few hundred yards from one another. The Black Sheep Brewery sponsors annual folk festivals. Previous performers have included Hugh Cornwell of The Stranglers. The town was also for a long time home to Lightfoot Brewery. This was bought by the Theakston family and closed in the 1920s. The Lightfoot brewery buildings are now used by Black Sheep.

The Masham Steam Engine & Fair Organ Rally is held annually, beginning in 1965 to raise money for Masham Town Hall, which the Masham Town Hall Community Charity organises fundraising for. The town holds an arts festival every two years.

The town has a snooker and billiards club, which was founded in 1871.

== Media ==
Local news and television programmes are provided by BBC North East and Cumbria and ITV Tyne Tees. Television signals are received from the Bilsdale TV transmitter.

Local radio stations are BBC Radio York, Greatest Hits Radio Harrogate & the Yorkshire Dales and Dales Radio.

The town is served by the local newspaper, Harrogate Advertiser.

== Transport ==
The nearest railway stations are Thirsk and Northallerton both of which are on the East Coast Main Line; although the town was formerly served by its own station on the Masham branch railway. The town is on the A6108 road between Ripon, Leyburn, Richmond and Scotch Corner, and is several miles west of the A1(M) motorway. Masham is served by the 144 (to Bedale) and 159 (Ripon –Leyburn and Richmond) bus routes.

== See also ==
- Listed buildings in Masham
