= Celia Whitelaw, Viscountess Whitelaw =

British viscountess

Celia, Viscountess Whitelaw (1 January 1917 – 5 December 2011) was the wife of William "Willie" Whitelaw, MP, former Home Secretary, Deputy Prime Minister and aide to Margaret Thatcher.

== Early life ==
Born as Cecilia Doriel Sprot (she later changed her name to Celia) at her family home, Riddell Estate near Melrose, to Major Mark Sprot of the Scots Guards and his wife, Meliora (née Hay), a daughter of Sir John Hay, 9th Baronet. Among her siblings was the British Army officer Aidan Sprot.

She attended school at the now defunct Oxenfoord Castle boarding school in Midlothian. During World War II, she volunteered to serve with the Women's Auxiliary Territorial Service (ATS) and was posted to Edinburgh Castle as a clerk with the Scottish Command. She was referenced in the book, Debs at War 1939-1945: How Wartime Changed Their Lives, written by Anne de Courcy.

== Charity work ==
After her husband returned to civilian life following World War II, she played an active role in helping him run his family estates in Dunbartonshire and Lanarkshire. When he decided to go into politics in the 1950s, she became first a vivacious campaigner and later an active parliamentary wife. When her husband was created Viscount Whitelaw in 1983, she became Viscountess Whitelaw, however the lack of a male heir ended the viscountcy with Whitelaw's death. Lady Whitelaw served on the Lakeland Horticultural Society and was vice-president of the Penrith and District Gardeners' and Allotment Holders' Association.

Lady Whitelaw was heavily involved in charity work and philanthropy, including Barnardo's, British Red Cross, the Blencowe Women's Institute, Wives of Westminster, the Eden Valley hospice (in Carlisle), and the Yellow Brick Road Appeal of the Children's Foundation.

== Personal life ==
She was engaged in 1942 and married William "Willie" Whitelaw in St Giles' Cathedral, Edinburgh, on 6 February 1943. Willie was a son of William Alexander Whitelaw, a member of a Scottish family of the landed gentry, who died when he was still a baby, and Helen Russell, a daughter of Major-General Francis Russell of Aden. They had four daughters:

- Hon. Elizabeth Susan Whitelaw (b. 1944), who married Nicholas Cunliffe-Lister, 3rd Earl of Swinton, in 1966.
- Hon. Carolyn Meliora Whitelaw (b. 1946), who married Robert Donald Macleod Thomas in 1973. They divorced in 1979 and she married Michael Francis Graves-Johnston in 1983.
- Hon. Mary Cecilia Whitelaw (b. 1947), who married David Alexander Coltman, son of Col. Thomas Alexander Hamilton Coltman of Daljarroch, in 1972.
- Hon. Pamela Winifred Whitelaw (b. 1951), who married Malise Charles Richard Graham, son of Maj. Sir Charles Graham, 6th Baronet, in 1974.

After her husband suffered a series of strokes from 1987, she cared for him until his death in 1999. Viscountess Whitelaw died in Edinburgh on 5 December 2011, aged 94. She was buried with her husband at St Andrew's Church, Dacre.
