= Listed buildings in Swinton with Warthermarske =

Swinton with Warthermarske is a civil parish in the county of North Yorkshire, England. It contains 13 listed buildings that are recorded in the National Heritage List for England. Of these, one is listed at Grade II*, the middle of the three grades, and the others are at Grade II, the lowest grade. The parish contains the village of Swinton, the hamlets of Roomer and Warthermarske, and the surrounding countryside. The most important building in the parish is the country house Swinton Castle (also known as Swinton Park), which is listed, together with associated buildings in its grounds. The other listed buildings include houses, a farmhouse, a barn, two stone coffins, and two bridges.

== Key ==
Grade	Criteria
II*	Particularly important buildings of more than special interest
II	Buildings of national importance and special interest

== Buildings ==
Name and location	Photograph	Date	Notes	Grade
Two coffins 54.21422°N 1.68441°W	—	Roman (probable)	The coffins were rediscovered in 1835 in the grounds to the west of Swinton Castle. They are in stone, and each consists of a monolith carved out with curved sides. One has a flat bevelled lid, and the other has a triangular-sectioned lid, hipped at one end.	II
Lower Swinton; 54.21233°N 1.67273°W	—	Late 17th century	A house, later divided into two, in stone, with chamfered quoins, a moulded eaves cornice, and a tile roof. There are two storeys, a double depth plan, and five bays. The central doorway has a moulded architrave, the windows are casements, and most are mullioned. At the rear is a round-arched stair window with a moulded surround.	II
Tudor; 54.21303°N 1.67679°W	—	Late 17th century	A house in the grounds of Swinton Castle, it is in stone on a plinth, with chamfered quoins, oversailing eaves, and a hipped stone slate roof. There are three storeys and a basement, and six bays. Steps lead up to the doorway that has a moulded stone surround. On the basement is a casement window, and the other windows are sashes; all the windows have moulded stone architraves.	II
Swinton Castle; 54.21264°N 1.67628°W		Early 18th century	A country house, also known as Swinton Park, it has been much altered and later used for other purposes. It is in stone with embattled parapets and hipped stone slate roofs, and consists of a main range and recessed wings. The east front has three storeys, and five bays, with an octagonal tower at each end. In the centre is a four-storey round tower with a porte cochère and round-headed sash windows. Elsewhere, the windows are mullioned, with sashes and hood moulds. The north wing has three storeys, twelve bays and octagonal towers.	II*
Rose Cottage; 54.21117°N 1.67357°W		Mid-18th century	The house is in stone, and has a stone slate roof with stone coping and shaped kneelers. There are two storeys and three bays. The doorway has a stone surround, and the windows are horizontally sliding sashes in chamfered stone surrounds.	II
Swinton Grange Barn; 54.21098°N 1.67380°W		Mid-18th century	The barn is in stone with quoins, a stone slate roof, and two storeys. It contains a doorway, windows and cross-arrow openings.	II
Former stables, Swinton Castle; 54.21319°N 1.67599°W		1752–53	The stable building, later used for other purposes, is in stone, and has a hipped stone slate roof with shaped kneelers. There are two storeys and 13 bays, the middle three bays projecting. All the ground floor bays have semicircular heads, moulded architraves, impost bands and lunette windows. Some contain a tripartite sash window with a Diocletian window above, some are infilled, and the centre bay is blind. The upper floor has quoins, and contains sash windows in moulded architraves. On the roof is a square stone clock turret on a plinth, with a segmental cornice carrying an octagonal arched wooden cupola with keystones and plain columns on a two-stepped plinth, with a cornice, a lead hipped roof, a ball finial and a weathervane.	II
Gateway and lodges, Swinton Castle; 54.21304°N 1.67293°W		c. 1754	The building is in stone with stone slate roofs, and consists of a central carriage arch flanked by pedestrian gates, that are linked by curtain walls to the lodges. The gateway has four vermiculated rusticated pilasters, and the carriage arch has a moulded surround, and a double keystone with a carved head. Above is a cornice, an open pediment and ball finials. The gates are in wrought iron. The lodges each has two storeys and two bays, quoins, moulded cornices, a parapet and a pyramidal roof. The windows are sashes, those on the upper floor with architraves and keystones.	II
Home Farmhouse; 54.21384°N 1.67645°W	—	Late 18th century	The house is in stone with a Welsh slate roof. There are two storeys and three bays. In the centre is a doorway, the windows are horizontally sliding sashes, and all the openings have stone lintels.	II
Quarry Gill Bridge and Old Quarry Gill Bridge; 54.21508°N 1.69954°W		1811	The bridges are in stone, and the lower bridge consists of a single round arch. The later bridge was built above it in 1822. This bridge consists of three tall pointed arches with hood moulds flanked by offset pilaster buttresses, and has a chamfered band and a chamfered embattled parapet.	II
Coffin Lake Bridge; 54.21453°N 1.68489°W	—	1813	The bridge, to the west of Swinton Castle at the north end of the Coffin Lake, is in stone, and consists of three segmental arches with voussoirs and cutwaters. The bridge has a stone band, and a partial parapet of large irregular shaped stones.	II
High House; 54.21390°N 1.67504°W		Early 19th century	The house is in stone, and has a stone slate roof with coped gables and shaped kneelers. There are two storeys and three bays, a lower recessed two-storey bay to the left, and a single-storey bay to the right, both bays with hipped roofs. The central doorway has a fanlight, above it is a blind window, the other windows are sashes, and on the right bay is a bay window with a hipped roof.	II
Park Farmhouse; 54.20661°N 1.68496°W	—	Early 19th century	The farmhouse is in stone, with quoins, and a stone slate roof with stone coping. There are two storeys and three bays, and two single-bay lower wings to the right. The central doorway has a two-pane fanlight, above it is a blind window, and the other windows are sashes with plain surrounds.	II
