= Philip Cunliffe-Lister, 1st Earl of Swinton =

British politician (1884–1972)

The Right Honourable The Earl of Swinton GBE CH MC PC
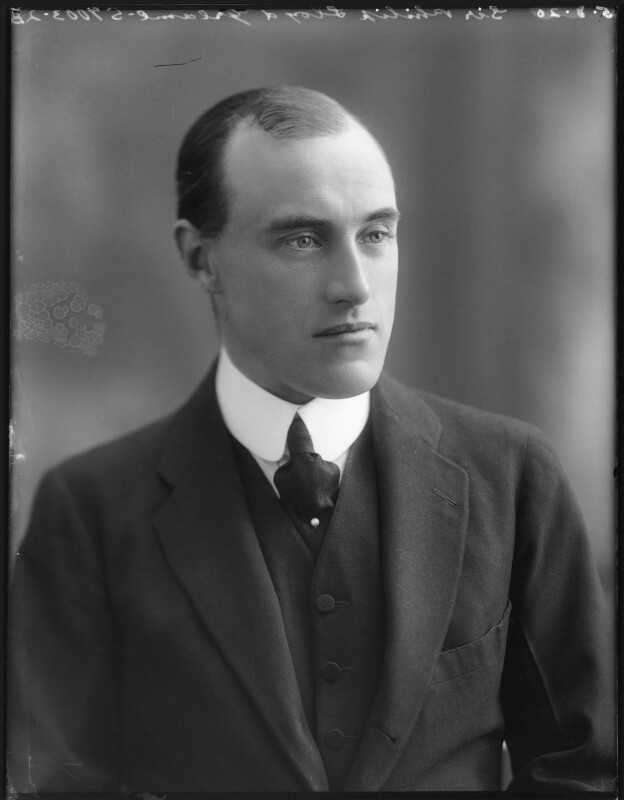
- Lloyd-Greame in 1920

Secretary of State for Commonwealth Relations
- In office 24 November 1952 – 7 April 1955
- Monarch: Elizabeth II
- Prime Minister: Winston Churchill
- Preceded by: The Marquess of Salisbury
- Succeeded by: The Earl of Home

Chancellor of the Duchy of Lancaster
- In office 31 October 1951 – 24 November 1952
- Monarchs: George VI; Elizabeth II
- Prime Minister: Winston Churchill
- Preceded by: The Viscount Alexander of Hillsborough
- Succeeded by: The Earl of Woolton

Minister of Civil Aviation
- In office 8 October 1944 – 26 July 1945
- Monarch: George VI
- Prime Minister: Winston Churchill
- Preceded by: Post established
- Succeeded by: The Lord Winster

Secretary of State for Air
- In office 7 June 1935 – 16 May 1938
- Monarchs: George V Edward VIII; George VI
- Prime Minister: Stanley Baldwin; Neville Chamberlain
- Preceded by: The Marquess of Londonderry
- Succeeded by: Kingsley Wood

Secretary of State for the Colonies
- In office 5 November 1931 – 7 June 1935
- Monarch: George V
- Prime Minister: Ramsay MacDonald
- Preceded by: James Henry Thomas
- Succeeded by: Malcolm MacDonald

President of the Board of Trade
- In office 25 August 1931 – 5 November 1931
- Monarch: George V
- Prime Minister: Ramsay MacDonald
- Preceded by: William Graham
- Succeeded by: Walter Runciman
- In office 6 November 1924 – 4 June 1929
- Monarch: George V
- Prime Minister: Stanley Baldwin
- Preceded by: Sidney Webb
- Succeeded by: William Graham
- In office 24 October 1922 – 22 January 1924
- Monarch: George V
- Prime Minister: Bonar Law; Stanley Baldwin
- Preceded by: Stanley Baldwin
- Succeeded by: Sidney Webb

Secretary for Overseas Trade
- In office 1 April 1921 – 19 October 1922
- Monarch: George V
- Prime Minister: David Lloyd George
- Preceded by: F G Kellaway
- Succeeded by: Sir William Joynson-Hicks, Bt

Parliamentary Secretary to the Board of Trade
- In office 22 August 1920 – 1 April 1921
- Monarch: George V
- Prime Minister: David Lloyd George
- Preceded by: William Bridgeman
- Succeeded by: William Mitchell-Thomson

Member of the House of Lords Lord Temporal
- In office 4 December 1935 – 27 July 1972; Hereditary peerage
- Preceded by: Peerage created
- Succeeded by: The 2nd Earl of Swinton

Member of Parliament for Hendon
- In office 14 December 1918 – 25 October 1935
- Preceded by: constituency established
- Succeeded by: Reginald Blair

Personal details
- Born: 1 May 1884 East Ayton, Yorkshire, England
- Died: 27 July 1972 (aged 88) Swinton, Yorkshire, England
- Resting place: Masham, Yorkshire, England
- Party: Conservative
- Spouse: Mary Constance Boynton (m. 1912)
- Education: Winchester College

Philip Cunliffe-Lister, 1st Earl of Swinton (1 May 1884 – 27 July 1972), known as Philip Lloyd-Greame until 1924 and as The Viscount Swinton between 1935 and 1955, was a prominent British Conservative politician from the 1920s until the 1950s. He was notable through the 1940s and 1950s as being firstly the Minister for Aviation and then being on the steering committee for the Convention on International Civil Aviation. He retired from politics in 1955, and his status was raised to an earldom.

== Background and early life ==
Beginning life as Philip Lloyd-Greame, he was the younger son of Lieutenant-Colonel Yarburgh George Lloyd-Greame (1840–1928) of Sewerby House, Bridlington, Yorkshire, by his wife Dora Letitia O'Brien, a daughter of the Right Reverend James Thomas O'Brien, Bishop of Ossory. His paternal grandfather was Yarburgh Gamaliel Lloyd, later Lloyd-Greame (1813–1890), who inherited Sewerby House by the will of his maternal uncle Yarburgh Greame, later Yarburgh (1782–1856).

He was educated at Winchester College, an all-boys public school in Winchester. He studied law at University College, Oxford, graduating with a Bachelor of Arts (BA) degree in 1905, then became an Honorary Fellow of his college and was admitted to the Inner Temple in 1908.

He joined the British Army in 1914, following the start of the First World War. He was mentioned in despatches and promoted to the rank of Major. In 1916, he was awarded the Military Cross (MC) while serving on the Western Front as a brigade major to the 124th Brigade of the 41st Division. During the war, Cunliffe-Lister spent time with Winston Churchill at his advanced HQ Lawrence Farm. They later worked together in the Stanley Baldwin ministries of the 1920s, when Cunliffe-Lister served as a minister of state. In 1917 he was appointed joint secretary to the Minister of National Service. He was noticed by David Lloyd George, who recruited the young man to be chairman of the Labour sub-committee of the war cabinet in Downing Street. At the end of the war, he stood as a Conservative candidate in the Coupon election of 1918.

== Political career ==
He agreed to join the Coalition slate and was elected for Hendon. He would hold this seat until his elevation to the House of Lords in 1935. His strong intellect was immediately recognizable as a member of the National Expenditure select committee scrutinizing the controversial McKenna Duties and Homes Fit For Heroes, after which in 1920 he was knighted.

He achieved his first ministerial post as Additional Under-Secretary Foreign Affairs in 1920 and took charge of the Overseas Trade Department in 1921 as Additional Parliamentary Secretary. In 1922 he became a Privy Counsellor and was appointed President of the Board of Trade, an office he would hold with two breaks until 1931. This fast elevation to the Cabinet came about because of the collapse of the Lloyd George Coalition Government, which forced the new Prime Minister Bonar Law to promote many inexperienced MPs.

In 1923, Law was forced to resign due to failing health and there was discussion as to whether he would be succeeded by Stanley Baldwin or Lord Curzon. As the last survivor of Law's Cabinet, Lloyd-Greame would later assert that it was Cabinet hostility to Curzon that prevented his appointment as Prime Minister, when he returned from the Imperial Economic Council. On 27 November 1924 Lloyd-Greame changed his surname to Cunliffe-Lister so as to be able to inherit property from his wife's family. Raised to Knight Grand Cross of the Order of the British Empire in 1929.

In 1931 Cunliffe-Lister was one of the Conservatives chosen to negotiate with the Labour Prime Minister Ramsay MacDonald as the latter's government collapsed and was replaced by the multi-party National Government. As a sign of his prominence within the party, Cunliffe-Lister was one of just four Conservatives in the emergency Cabinet of 10, serving for the third and final time as President of the Board of Trade.

The National Government won a massive election victory in the 1931 general election but was internally divided on the question of protective tariffs. So as to balance the Cabinet Cunliffe-Lister was replaced at the Board of Trade by the supposed Free Trader Walter Runciman, and instead became Secretary of State for the Colonies, which he would hold until June 1935. When MacDonald retired as Prime Minister and was succeeded by Stanley Baldwin a Cabinet reshuffle took place in which Cunliffe-Lister became Secretary of State for Air. At the 1935 general election he did not contest his seat and was instead ennobled as Viscount Swinton, retaining his ministerial office for the next three years into the premiership of Neville Chamberlain he took the strategic post of Secretary of State for Air responsible for Britain air defences in the lead up to war.

He also seemingly served on the Home Security Executive during the war. Letters were exchanged between Swinton and Oswald Allen Harker regarding the detention of Barry Domvile. KV2-834, National Archives.

As Swinton was now in the House of Lords his hands were free to be Chairman of the UK Commercial Corporation responsible for boosting enterprise and output. So Chamberlain appointed the Chancellor of the Duchy of Lancaster Lord Winterton (an Irish peer who sat in the House of Commons) to speak for the Air Ministry in the Commons. This arrangement did not prove successful and in May 1938 there was a disastrous debate on air and it became clear to Chamberlain that the Secretary of State must sit in the House of Commons. Swinton was dismissed, his political career seemingly over.

After serving as Minister Resident in West Africa and being made a Member of the Order of the Companions of Honour in 1943, during the Second World War Swinton's career revived when he was appointed as the first Minister of Civil Aviation, a post he held until the end of the war. During 1944 he served on the executive committee and on the Steering Committee at the Convention on International Civil Aviation done in Chicago, formally representing the United Kingdom.

When Winston Churchill formed his peacetime government in 1951 he appointed Swinton as Chancellor of the Duchy of Lancaster and Minister for War Materials a year later. As Deputy Leader of the House of Lords, Lord Swinton was also Secretary of State for Commonwealth Relations for three years. When in 1955 Churchill retired, Swinton insisted on retiring too, and he was further ennobled as the Earl of Swinton. Towards the end of his life, Swinton was an Honorary Fellow of University College, Oxford.

== Family ==
Philip Lloyd-Greame married Mary Constance "Mollie" Boynton (died 1974) on 5 September 1912. She was the granddaughter of industrialist Samuel Cunliffe-Lister, 1st Baron Masham who had bought Swinton Park in 1882. In 1924, Philip and Molly Lloyd-Greame took the name of Cunliffe-Lister and moved to Swinton (sold in 1980 by the 2nd Earl and bought back 2000 by his nephew, Lord Masham and the latter's family).

- John Yarburgh Cunliffe-Lister (1913– †14 April 1943)
- S/Ldr The Hon Philip Ingram Cunliffe-Lister DSO RAF (1918–1956)

Their elder son, John, was killed in the Second World War, leaving two sons of his own, of whom the elder grandson succeeded his grandfather as the 2nd Earl of Swinton, and was succeeded 2006 by his younger brother as the 3rd Earl of Swinton. The third Earl died in 2024. He had two sons, the elder of whom, Mark, has succeeded to the title as the fourth Earl.

== Cultural Portrayals ==
In the BBC miniseries Winston Churchill: The Wilderness Years, Swinton was portrayed by Walter Gotell.

== Footnotes ==
Parliament of the United Kingdom
New constituency	Member of Parliament for Hendon; 1918–1935	Succeeded by Sir Reginald Blair
Political offices
Preceded by Stanley Baldwin	President of the Board of Trade; 1922–1924	Succeeded by Sidney Webb
Preceded by Sidney Webb	President of the Board of Trade; 1924–1929	Succeeded by William Graham
Preceded by William Graham	President of the Board of Trade; 1931	Succeeded by Walter Runciman
Preceded by James Henry Thomas	Secretary of State for the Colonies; 1931–1935	Succeeded by Malcolm MacDonald
Preceded by The Marquess of Londonderry	Secretary of State for Air; 1935–1938	Succeeded by Kingsley Wood
New office	Minister of Civil Aviation; 1943–1945	Succeeded by The Lord Winster
Preceded by A. V. Alexander	Chancellor of the Duchy of Lancaster; 1951–1952	Succeeded by The Lord Woolton
Preceded by The Marquess of Salisbury	Secretary of State for Commonwealth Relations; 1952–1955	Succeeded by The Earl of Home
Honorary titles
Preceded by Sir Winston Churchill	Senior Privy Counsellor; 1965–1972	Succeeded by The Duke of Gloucester
Peerage of the United Kingdom
New creation	Earl of Swinton; 1955–1972	Succeeded by David Cunliffe-Lister
New creation	Viscount Swinton; 1935–1972	Succeeded by David Cunliffe-Lister
New creation	Baron Masham; 3rd creation 1955–1972	Succeeded by David Cunliffe-Lister
