= Baroness Masham =

Baroness Masham may refer to:

- Abigail Masham, Baroness Masham (c. 1670 – 1734), English courtier and royal favourite
- Susan Cunliffe-Lister, Baroness Masham of Ilton (1935–2023), British life peer and disability campaigner

== See also ==
- Baron Masham, a title in the Peerage of the United Kingdom
- Damaris, Lady Masham (1659–1708), English philosopher and theologian
