= Swinton with Warthermarske =

Civil parish in North Yorkshire, England

Coordinates: 54.20°N 1.68°W

Swinton with Warthermarske is a civil parish in the county of North Yorkshire, England. The parish includes the village of Swinton and the hamlets of Roomer and Warthermarske. It also includes Swinton Park, although the wider Swinton Estate extends well beyond the parish. To the north it is separated from the parish of Masham by the River Burn, and is bounded on the east by the River Ure.

The population of the parish was estimated at 90 in 2016.

Swinton with Warthermarske was historically a township in the ancient parish of Masham in the North Riding of Yorkshire. It became a separate civil parish in 1866. In 1934 the parish was enlarged by the addition of Nutwith and Roomer Common, which had been an area of stinted pasture common to all the townships of the ancient parish of Masham. In 1974 the parish was transferred to the new county of North Yorkshire. From 1974 to 2023 it was part of the Borough of Harrogate, it is now administered by the unitary North Yorkshire Council.

The parish now shares a grouped parish council, known as Masham Parish Council, with Masham, Burton on Yore and Ellington High and Low.

== See also ==
- Listed buildings in Swinton with Warthermarske
