= David Cunliffe-Lister, 2nd Earl of Swinton =

British politician

The Right Honourable The Earl of Swinton JP DL

Deputy Chief Whip of the House of Lords Captain of the Yeomen of the Guard
- In office 20 October 1982 – 10 September 1986
- Prime Minister: Margaret Thatcher
- Preceded by: The Lord Sandys
- Succeeded by: The Viscount Davidson

Member of the House of Lords Lord Temporal
- In office 28 July 1972 – 11 November 1999 as a hereditary peer
- Preceded by: The 1st Earl of Swinton
- Succeeded by: Seat abolished (Note: Seat abolished by the House of Lords Act 1999.)

Personal details
- Born: 21 March 1937
- Died: 26 March 2006 (aged 69)
- Party: Conservative
- Spouse: The Baroness Masham of Ilton (m. 1959)
- Education: Winchester College, Royal Agricultural College

David Yarburgh Cunliffe-Lister, 2nd Earl of Swinton, JP, DL (21 March 1937 – 26 March 2006), styled Lord Masham from 1955 to 1972, was a British peer and politician.

== Background ==
David Cunliffe-Lister was the son of the Hon. John Yarburgh Cunliffe-Lister and his wife Anne Irvine Medlicott. His father died in 1943 of wounds received action in during World War II. David was educated at Winchester College and the Royal Agricultural College, Cirencester.

His grandfather, Philip Cunliffe-Lister, who was created Viscount Swinton in 1935 and Earl of Swinton in 1955, had been an MP and a veteran of 11 Conservative cabinets. His great-grandfather was Samuel Lister, the founder of Lister's Mill in Bradford. Before the nationalisation of the coal industry, the family had owned the colliery in Featherstone and David never forgot his links with the area, being a fervent supporter, as well as president of, Featherstone Rovers Rugby League Club.

Cunliffe-Lister succeeded as the 2nd Earl of Swinton on the death of his grandfather in 1972 and served as Deputy Chief Whip in the House of Lords under Margaret Thatcher from 1982 to 1986. He was also government spokesman on agriculture and education from 1983 to 1986. He left the House of Lords following the House of Lords Act 1999.

== Personal life ==
In 1959, he married Susan Lilian Primrose Sinclair who was created a life peer as Baroness Masham of Ilton in 1970. He and his wife were one of the few couples who both held noble titles in their own right. They adopted two children, Claire and Jessie.

== Later life ==
Lord Swinton was a member of the North Riding of Yorkshire County Council 1961–1974, and of its successor, North Yorkshire County Council, 1973–1977. He was also a magistrate and Deputy Lieutenant of North Yorkshire. He was also formerly a member of the Countryside Commission and a director of the Leeds Permanent Building Society.

== Death ==
Dogged by illness for the last 10 years of his life, Swinton suffered a stroke and was disabled by its effects and those of Parkinson's disease. He also suffered from diabetes and eventually cancer. He died 5 days after his 69th birthday. His funeral took place at St Mary's Church, Masham, on 6 April 2006. He was succeeded in the earldom and viscountcy by his younger brother Nicholas.

== Notes ==
Political offices
Preceded by The Lord Sandys	Captain of the Yeomen of the Guard; 1982–1986	Succeeded by The Viscount Davidson
Peerage of the United Kingdom
Preceded by Philip Cunliffe-Lister	Earl of Swinton; 1972–2006; Member of the House of Lords (1972–1999)	Succeeded by Nicholas Cunliffe-Lister
Preceded by Philip Cunliffe-Lister	Viscount Swinton; 1972–2006	Succeeded by Nicholas Cunliffe-Lister
Preceded by Philip Cunliffe-Lister	Baron Masham; 3rd creation 1972–2006	Succeeded by Nicholas Cunliffe-Lister
