= Earl of Swinton =

Title in the peerage of the United Kingdom

Earldom of Swinton
- Blazon Arms: Quarterly: 1st & 4th, Ermine, on a Fess Sable, three Mullets Or, and for distinction a Cross-Crosslet Sable (Lister); 2nd, Sable, three Conies courant Argent, and for distinction a Cross-Crosslet Argent (Cunliffe); 3rd, Or, two Chevronels Sable, on a Chief Sable, three Escallops Or (Greame). Crests: Centre: a Stag’s Head proper, erased Or, attired Sable, charged on the neck, for distinction, with a Cross-Crosslet Sable (Lister). Dexter: a Greyhound sejant Argent, collared with a ring attached Sable, charged on the shoulder, for distinction, with a Cross-Crosslet Sable (Cunliffe). Sinister: on a Mount Vert, a Pair of Wings addorsed Or semée of Escallops Sable (Greame). Supporters: On either side a Stag proper, collared with a Chain Or, suspended therefrom to the dexter a Rose Argent, and to the sinister an Escallop Argent.
- Creation date: 5 May 1955
- Created by: Queen Elizabeth II
- Peerage: Peerage of the United Kingdom
- First holder: Philip Cunliffe-Lister, 1st Earl of Swinton
- Present holder: Mark William Philip Cunliffe-Lister, 4th Earl of Swinton
- Heir apparent: William Edward Cunliffe-Lister, Lord Masham
- Remainder to: the 1st Earl's heirs male of the body lawfully begotten
- Subsidiary titles: Viscount Swinton; Baron Masham
- Seat: Dykes Hill House
- Former seat: Swinton Park
- Motto: 1st: RETINENS VESTIGIA FAMÆ (Maintaining the tradition of fame) (Lister); 2nd: FIDELITER (Faithfully) (Cunliffe); 3rd: C’EST LA VIRTU SEUL QUI DONNE LA NOBLESSE (Virtue alone confers nobility) (Greame).

Earl of Swinton is a title in the Peerage of the United Kingdom. It was created in 1955 for the prominent Conservative politician Philip Cunliffe-Lister, 1st Viscount Swinton. He had already been created Viscount Swinton, of Masham in the County of York, in 1935, and was made Baron Masham, of Ellington in the County of York, at the same time he was given the earldom. Born Philip Lloyd-Greame, he was the husband of Mary Constance "Molly" Boynton, granddaughter of Samuel Cunliffe-Lister, 1st Baron Masham. When his wife inherited the large Masham estates in 1924, they assumed the surname of Cunliffe-Lister in lieu of Lloyd-Greame.

The earl was succeeded by his grandson, who became the second earl. He was the eldest son of Major the Hon. John Yarburgh Cunliffe-Lister, who was killed in the Second World War. Lord Swinton notably served as Captain of the Yeomen of the Guard (deputy chief government whip in the House of Lords) from 1982 to 1986 in the Conservative administration of Margaret Thatcher. His wife was Susan Cunliffe-Lister, Baroness Masham of Ilton. As of 2021 the titles are held by Lord Swinton's nephew, the fourth earl, who succeeded his father in that year.

The title is named after Swinton Park near Masham, North Yorkshire. The family seat is now Dykes Hill House, also near Masham.

== Viscount Swinton (1935) ==
- Philip Cunliffe-Lister, 1st Viscount Swinton (1884–1972) (created Baron Masham and Earl of Swinton in 1955)

=== Earl of Swinton (1955) ===
- Philip Cunliffe-Lister, 1st Earl of Swinton (1884–1972)
  - Hon. John Yarburgh Cunliffe-Lister (1913– †1943)
- David Yarburgh Cunliffe-Lister, 2nd Earl of Swinton (1937–2006)
- Nicholas John Cunliffe-Lister, 3rd Earl of Swinton (1939–2021)
- Mark William Philip Cunliffe-Lister, 4th Earl of Swinton (b. 1970)

== Present peer ==
Mark William Philip Cunliffe-Lister, 4th Earl of Swinton (born 15 September 1970), is the son of the 3rd Earl and his wife Elizabeth Susan Whitelaw, eldest daughter of William Whitelaw. He was styled as Lord Masham between 2006 and 2021.

A geophysicist with a degree in engineering from Durham University, he converted the family seat, Swinton Park, into a luxury hotel.

On 21 March 2021, Cunliffe-Lister succeeded his father as Earl of Swinton, Viscount Swinton, of Masham, and Baron Masham.

On 17 June 2000, he married Felicity C. Shadbolt, daughter of Kenneth Shadbolt, and they have three children:

- Lady Grace Elizabeth Cunliffe-Lister (born 2002)
- William Edward Cunliffe-Lister, Lord Masham (born 2004), heir apparent
- Timothy Cunliffe-Lister (born 2007)

== Title succession chart ==
Title succession chart, Viscounts Swinton, Earls of Swinton and Barons Masham (2nd and 3rd creations).

Baron Masham (2nd creation), 1891
Samuel Lister; 1815–1906; 1st Baron Masham
Samuel Cunliffe-Lister; 1857–1917; 2nd Baron Masham	Mary (Cunliffe-Lister) Boynton; 1859–1896	John Cunliffe-Lister; 1867–1924; 3rd Baron Masham
Viscount Swinton, 1935; Earl of Swinton and Baron Masham (3rd creation), 1955	Barony Masham extinct
Philip (Lloyd-Greame) Cunliffe-Lister; 1884–1972; 1st Earl of Swinton, etc.	Mary Boynton died 1975
Maj. John Cunliffe-Lister; 1913–1943
David Cunliffe-Lister; 1937–2006; 2nd Earl of Swinton, etc.	Nicholas Cunliffe-Lister; 1939–2021; 3rd Earl of Swinton
Mark Cunliffe-Lister b. 1970; 4th Earl of Swinton
William Cunliffe-Lister b. 2004 styled Lord Masham

== Line of succession ==
Line of succession
- Philip Cunliffe-Lister, 1st Earl of Swinton (1884–1972)
  - Maj. Hon. John Yarburgh Cunliffe-Lister (1913–1943)
    - David Yarburgh Cunliffe-Lister, 2nd Earl of Swinton (1937–2006)
    - Nicholas John Cunliffe-Lister, 3rd Earl of Swinton (1939–2021)
      - Mark William Philip Cunliffe-Lister, 4th Earl of Swinton (born 1970)
        - (1) William Edward Cunliffe-Lister, Lord Masham (born 2004)
        - (2) Hon. Timothy Samuel Cunliffe-Lister (born 2007)
      - (3) Hon. Simon Charles Cunliffe-Lister (born 1977)
        - (4) Joss Nicholas Cunliffe-Lister (born 2008)
        - (5) Otis Arthur Cunliffe-Lister (born 2010)
        - (6) Inigo John Cunliffe-Lister (born 2012)
        - (7) Sholto Yarburgh Cunliffe-Lister (born 2016)
  - Hon. Philip Ingram Cunliffe-Lister (1918–1956)
    - male issue in remainder

== See also ==
- Baron Masham
