= Susan Cunliffe-Lister (Lord Lieutenant) =

The Honourable Dame Susan Cunliffe-Lister DCVO
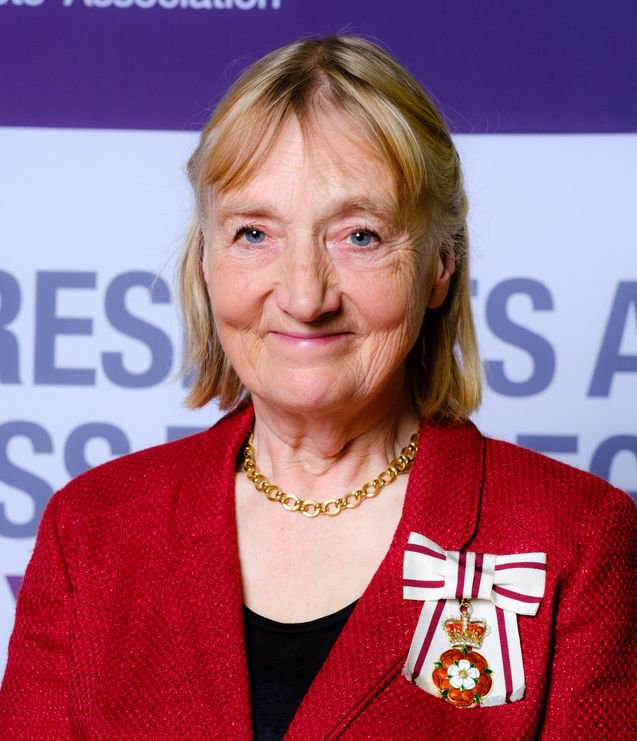

Personal details
- Born: Elizabeth Susan Whitelaw; 1944 (age 81–82) Masham, England
- Citizenship: United Kingdom
- Spouse: Nicholas Cunliffe-Lister, 3rd Earl of Swinton
- Relations: William Whitelaw, 1st Viscount Whitelaw (father)
- Children: Mark Cunliffe-Lister, 4th Earl of Swinton Simon Cunliffe-Lister
- Occupation: Gardener

Dame Elizabeth Susan Cunliffe-Lister (née Whitelaw; born 1944), commonly known by her middle name Susan, served as the Lord Lieutenant of the East Riding of Yorkshire from 2005 until her retirement in 2019.

Susan Cunliffe-Lister is the former President of the Yorkshire Agricultural Society and founder of the Great Yorkshire Show and the Sheep Fair in Masham. She is currently the Head Gardener at Swinton Estate, owned by her son Mark Cunliffe-Lister, 4th Earl of Swinton.

She is a gardener and managed the Burton Agnes Hall from 1989 until 2008 and also the Swinton Estate where she still manages and tends to the gardens to the present day. She was appointed a Deputy lieutenant for the East Riding of Yorkshire in 1996, served as High Sheriff of the Riding in 2001–2002, and became its Lord-lieutenant in 2005.

Cunliffe-Lister has written a book, Days of Yore: A History of Masham.

In the 2019 New Year Honours, Cunliffe-Lister was appointed a Dame Commander of the Royal Victorian Order by Queen Elizabeth II in recognition of her many years of service as the Lord Lieutenant of the East Riding of Yorkshire.
