= William Whitelaw =

British politician (1918–1999)

The Right Honourable The Viscount Whitelaw KT CH MC PC DL
- Whitelaw in 1963

Deputy Prime Minister of the United Kingdom
- De facto 4 May 1979 – 10 January 1988
- Prime Minister: Margaret Thatcher
- Preceded by: Rab Butler (de facto, 1963)
- Succeeded by: Geoffrey Howe

Lord President of the Council
- In office 11 June 1983 – 10 January 1988
- Prime Minister: Margaret Thatcher
- Preceded by: John Biffen
- Succeeded by: John Wakeham
- In office 20 June 1970 – 7 April 1972
- Prime Minister: Edward Heath
- Preceded by: Fred Peart
- Succeeded by: Robert Carr

Leader of the House of Lords
- In office 11 June 1983 – 10 January 1988
- Prime Minister: Margaret Thatcher
- Preceded by: The Baroness Young
- Succeeded by: The Baron Belstead

Home Secretary
- In office 4 May 1979 – 11 June 1983
- Prime Minister: Margaret Thatcher
- Preceded by: Merlyn Rees
- Succeeded by: Leon Brittan

Deputy Leader of the Conservative Party
- In office 12 February 1975 – 7 August 1991
- Leader: Margaret Thatcher; John Major
- Preceded by: Reginald Maudling (1972)
- Succeeded by: Peter Lilley (1998)

Secretary of State for Employment
- In office 2 December 1973 – 4 March 1974
- Prime Minister: Edward Heath
- Preceded by: Maurice Macmillan
- Succeeded by: Michael Foot

Secretary of State for Northern Ireland
- In office 24 March 1972 – 2 December 1973
- Prime Minister: Edward Heath
- Preceded by: Office established
- Succeeded by: Francis Pym

Leader of the House of Commons
- In office 20 June 1970 – 7 April 1972
- Prime Minister: Edward Heath
- Preceded by: Fred Peart
- Succeeded by: Robert Carr
Party political offices 1964–1975
Chairman of the Conservative Party
In office 11 June 1974 – 11 February 1975
Leader	Edward Heath
Preceded by	Peter Carington
Succeeded by	Peter Thorneycroft
Opposition Chief Whip in the House of Commons
In office 27 November 1964 – 20 June 1970
Leader	Alec Douglas-Home; Edward Heath
Preceded by	Martin Redmayne
Succeeded by	Francis Pym
Opposition Deputy Chief Whip in the House of Commons
In office 29 October 1964 – 27 November 1964
Leader	Alec Douglas-Home
Preceded by	John Hill
Succeeded by	Brian Batsford
Junior ministerial offices
Parliamentary Secretary to the Ministry of Labour
In office 16 July 1962 – 16 October 1964
Prime Minister	Harold Macmillan; Alec Douglas-Home
Preceded by	Alan Green
Succeeded by	Office abolished
Lord Commissioner of the Treasury
In office 6 March 1961 – 16 July 1962
Prime Minister	Harold Macmillan
Preceded by	Paul Bryan
Succeeded by	Gordon Campbell
Shadow Cabinet posts
Shadow Home Secretary
In office 11 April 1976 – 4 May 1979
Leader	Margaret Thatcher
Preceded by	Ian Gilmour
Succeeded by	Merlyn Rees
Parliamentary offices
Member of the House of Lords
Lord Temporal
In office 16 June 1983 – 1 July 1999
Preceded by	Peerage created
Succeeded by	Peerage extinct
Member of Parliament for Penrith and The Border
In office 26 May 1955 – 11 June 1983
Preceded by	Donald Scott
Succeeded by	David Maclean

Personal details
- Born: William Stephen Ian Whitelaw; 28 June 1918 Edinburgh, Scotland
- Died: 1 July 1999 (aged 81) Blencow, England
- Party: Conservative
- Spouse: Cecilia Sprot (m. 1943)
- Children: 4
- Education: Trinity College, Cambridge

Military service
- Allegiance: United Kingdom
- Branch/service: British Army
- Years of service: 1939–1946
- Rank: Major
- Unit: Scots Guards
- Battles/wars: World War II

William Stephen Ian Whitelaw, 1st Viscount Whitelaw (28 June 1918 – 1 July 1999) was a British Conservative Party politician who served in a wide number of Cabinet positions, most notably as Home Secretary from 1979 to 1983 and as de facto Deputy Prime Minister of the United Kingdom from 1979 to 1988. He was Deputy Leader of the Conservative Party from 1975 to 1991.

After the Conservative Party won an unexpected victory at the 1970 general election, Whitelaw was appointed as Leader of the House of Commons and Lord President of the Council by Prime Minister Edward Heath. After the suspension of the Stormont Parliament resulted in the imposition of direct rule, Whitelaw served as Secretary of State for Northern Ireland from 1972 to 1973. He also served under Heath as Secretary of State for Employment from 1973 to 1974 and as Chairman of the Conservative Party from 1974 to 1975.

Whitelaw served Prime Minister Margaret Thatcher throughout her leadership of the Conservative Party as deputy party leader. He served as de facto Deputy Prime Minister between 1979 and 1988 and as Home Secretary from 1979 to 1983. He stepped down as a Member of Parliament two days after the 1983 general election, and was appointed as a Member of the House of Lords. He served as Leader of the House of Lords and Lord President of the Council from 1983 to 1988. He was a captain of The Royal and Ancient Golf Club of St Andrews.

== Early life ==
Whitelaw was born in Edinburgh, Scotland, and raised at the family home, "Monklands", on Thurlow Road in Nairn. He never met his father, William Alexander Whitelaw, born 1892, a member of a Scottish family of the landed gentry, who died in 1919 after service in the Argyll and Sutherland Highlanders in the First World War, when his son was still a baby. Whitelaw was brought up by his mother, Helen, a daughter of Major General Francis Russell, MP for Cheltenham and a military attaché, and his paternal grandfather William Whitelaw. One of his great-aunts by marriage, born Dorothy Sarah Disraeli, was the niece of former Prime Minister Benjamin Disraeli.

Whitelaw was educated first at Wixenford School, Wokingham, before passing the entrance exam to Winchester College. From there he went up to Trinity College, Cambridge, where he won a blue for golf and joined the Officer Training Corps. By chance he was in a summer camp in 1939 on the outbreak of the Second World War and was granted a regular, not wartime, commission in the British Army, in the Scots Guards, later serving in the 6th Guards Tank Brigade, a separate unit from the Guards Armoured Division. He commanded Churchill tanks in Normandy during the Second World War and during Operation Bluecoat in late July 1944. His was the first Allied unit to encounter German Jagdpanther tank destroyers, being attacked by three out of the twelve Jagdpanthers which were in Normandy.

The battalion's second-in-command was killed when his tank was hit in front of Whitelaw's eyes; Whitelaw succeeded to this position, holding it, with the rank of major, throughout the advance through the Netherlands into Germany and until the end of the war. He was awarded the Military Cross for his actions at Caumont; a photograph of Field Marshal Bernard Montgomery pinning the medal to his chest appears in his memoirs. After the end of the war in Europe, Whitelaw's unit was to have taken part in the invasion of Japan, but the Pacific War ended before this. Instead he was posted to Palestine, before leaving the army in 1946 to take care of the family estates of Gartshore and Woodhall in Lanarkshire, which he inherited on the death of his grandfather.

== Political career ==
Following early defeats as a candidate for the constituency of East Dunbartonshire in 1950 and 1951, Whitelaw was elected as Member of Parliament (MP) for Penrith and The Border at the 1955 general election and represented that constituency for 28 years. He held his first government posts under Harold Macmillan as a Lord of the Treasury (government whip) between 1961 and 1962 and then under Macmillan and Alec Douglas-Home was Parliamentary Secretary to the Ministry of Labour between 1962 and 1964. After the Conservatives lost the 1964 election, Douglas-Home appointed Whitelaw as Opposition Chief Whip. He was sworn of the Privy Council in January 1967.

=== Heath government, 1970–1974 ===
When the Conservatives returned to power in 1970 under Edward Heath, Whitelaw was made Lord President of the Council and Leader of the House of Commons, with a seat in the cabinet. Upon the imposition of direct rule in March 1972, he became the first Secretary of State for Northern Ireland, serving in that capacity until November 1973. During his time in Northern Ireland he introduced Special Category Status for paramilitary prisoners. He attempted to negotiate with the Provisional Irish Republican Army, meeting its Chief of Staff Seán Mac Stiofáin in July 1972. The talks ended in an agreement to change from a seven-day truce to an open-ended truce; however, this did not last long. As a briefing for prime minister Heath later noted, Whitelaw "found the experience of meeting and talking to Mr Mac Stíofáin very unpleasant". Mac Stiofáin in his memoir complimented Whitelaw as cordial, direct, and smarter than he appeared on television (though artificial in some ways) noting that he pronounced Mac Stíofáin's name perfectly in Irish.

In 1973, Whitelaw left Northern Ireland—shortly before the Sunningdale Agreement was reached—to become Secretary of State for Employment, and confronted the National Union of Mineworkers over its pay demands. This dispute was followed by the Conservative Party losing the February 1974 general election. Also in 1974, Whitelaw became a Member of the Order of the Companions of Honour.

=== In opposition, 1974–1979 ===
Soon after Harold Wilson's Labour Party returned to government, Heath appointed Whitelaw as deputy leader of the opposition and chairman of the Conservative Party. Following a second defeat in the October 1974 general election, during which Whitelaw had accused Wilson of going "round and round the country stirring up apathy", Heath was forced to call a leadership election in 1975. Whitelaw loyally refused to run against Heath; however, and to widespread surprise, Margaret Thatcher narrowly defeated Heath in the first round. Whitelaw stood in his place and lost convincingly against Thatcher in the second round. The vote polarised along right–left lines, with in addition the region, experience and education of the MP having their effects.

Whitelaw managed to maintain his position as deputy leader until the 1979 general election, when he was appointed Home Secretary. In an unofficial capacity, he also served as Deputy Prime Minister in Thatcher's new government.

=== Home Secretary, 1979–1983 ===
Thatcher admired Whitelaw and appointed him Home Secretary in her first Cabinet, later writing of him "Willie is a big man in character as well as physically. He wanted the success of the Government which from the first he accepted would be guided by my general philosophy. Once he had pledged his loyalty, he never withdrew it". Thatcher was rumoured to have said that "every Prime Minister needs a Willie" and Whitelaw was seen as Thatcher's de facto Deputy Prime Minister between 1979 and 1988 (though he never formally held the office), to the extent that the then Cabinet Secretary, Robert Armstrong, said that had Thatcher been killed in the Brighton hotel bombing, he thought he would have advised Queen Elizabeth II to send for Whitelaw.

As home secretary, Whitelaw adopted a hard-line approach to law and order. He improved police pay and embarked upon a programme of extensive prison building. His four-year tenure in office, however, was generally perceived as a troubled one. His much vaunted "short, sharp shock" policy, whereby convicted young offenders were detained in secure units and subjected to quasi-military discipline, won approval from the public but proved expensive to implement. He was home secretary during the six-day Iranian Embassy siege in April–May 1980.

In March 1981, he approved Wolverhampton Metropolitan Borough Council's 14-day ban on political marches in the borough in response to a planned National Front demonstration there.

Inner city decay, unemployment and what was perceived at the time as heavy-handed policing of ethnic minorities (notably the application of what some called the "notorious" sus law) sparked major riots in London, Liverpool, Birmingham and Leeds, and a spate of disturbances elsewhere. The Provisional IRA escalated its bombing campaign in England.

He contemplated resigning after an intruder broke into the Queen's bedroom in 1982 but was dissuaded from doing so. "We couldn't do without Willie," Margaret Thatcher reflected in later years. "He was a wonderful person."

=== Leader of the House of Lords, 1983–1988 ===
Two days after the 1983 general election, Whitelaw received a hereditary peerage (the first created for 18 years) as Viscount Whitelaw, of Penrith in the County of Cumbria. Thatcher appointed him Lord President of the Council and Leader of the House of Lords. Lord Whitelaw faced many challenges in attempting to manage the House of Lords, facing a major defeat over abolition of the Greater London Council within a year of taking over. However, his patrician and moderate style appealed to Conservative peers and his tenure is considered a success.

During his period as her deputy and as Leader of the Lords, Thatcher relied on Whitelaw heavily; she famously announced that "every prime minister needs a Willie". He chaired the "star chamber" committee that settled the annual disputes between the limited resources made available by Treasury and the spending demands of other government departments. It was Whitelaw, in November 1980, who managed to dissuade Thatcher from going to Leeds to take charge of the Yorkshire Ripper investigation personally.

=== Resignation ===
Following a stroke in December 1987, he felt he had no choice but to resign. Nicholas Ridley argued that Whitelaw's retirement marked the beginning of the end of the Thatcher premiership, as he was no longer around as often to give sensible advice and to moderate her stance on issues, or to maintain a consensus of support in her own Cabinet and parliamentary party. He resigned from the Cabinet on 10 January 1988.

== Marriage and issue ==
Whitelaw was married in 1943 to Cecilia Doriel Sprot (later Celia, Viscountess Whitelaw; 1917-2011), a philanthropist, charity worker and horticulturist who had been an ATS volunteer during the Second World War. They had four daughters:

- The Hon Elizabeth Susan Whitelaw (born 2 November 1944), married Nicholas Cunliffe-Lister, 3rd Earl of Swinton, mother of Mark Cunliffe-Lister, 4th Earl of Swinton.
- The Hon Carolyn Meliora Whitelaw (born 1946)
- The Hon Mary Cecilia Whitelaw (born 15 November 1947)
- The Hon Pamela Winifred Whitelaw (born 9 March 1951)

== Retirement and death ==
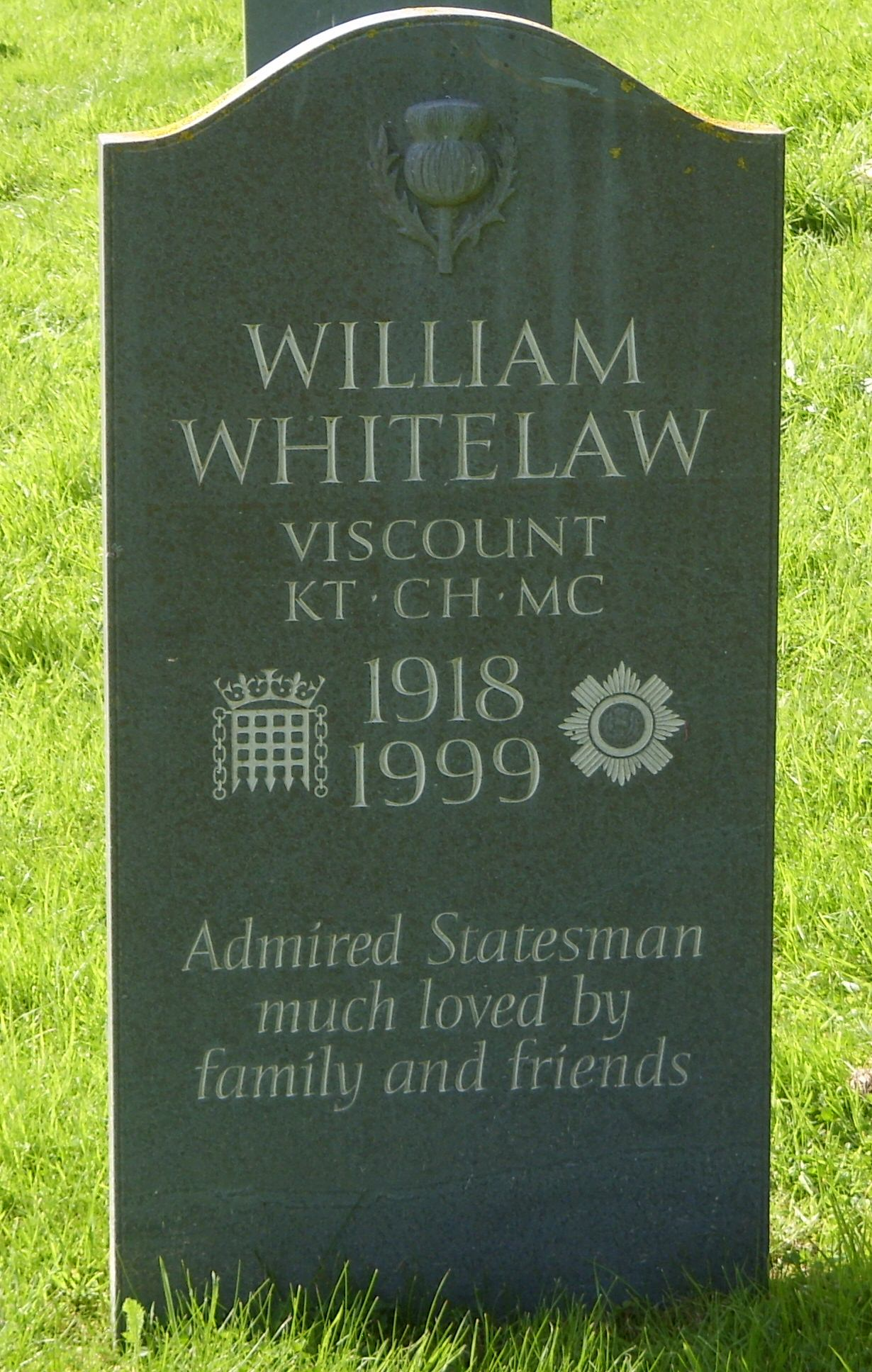
The grave of William Whitelaw

During his retirement and until his death, Whitelaw was the chairman of the board of Governors at St Bees School, Cumbria. He was appointed a Knight of the Thistle in 1990. He formally resigned as Deputy Leader of the Conservative Party in 1991; a farewell dinner was held in his honour on 7 August 1991.

After several years of declining health, Whitelaw died from natural causes at Ennim, his home in Blencow, on 1 July 1999, shortly after his 81st birthday. He had been married for 56 years. Although Whitelaw was given a hereditary peerage, the title became extinct on his death as his daughters were unable to inherit. His home for many years was the mansion of Ennim, just outside the village of Great Blencow near Penrith, Cumbria. He was buried at St. Andrew's Parish Church, Dacre, Cumbria. Whitelaw was an active freemason.

Coat of arms of William Whitelaw
Crest A Bee erect proper Escutcheon Sable a Chevron engrailed Or between three Boars' Heads couped Argent armed and langued Or Supporters On either side a Charolais Bull in trian aspect proper each with a Garland about the shoulder of Roses Gules barbed and seeded slipped and leaved and Thistles stalked and leaved proper and interlaced in front with two Pairs of Golf Clubs fretted saltirewise Gold; the Compartment comprising three Mounts of Moorland proper growing from each of these to the fore two Roses and as many Thistles the Roses Gules barbed and seeded stalked and leaved proper and the Thistles stalked and leaved also proper Motto Solertia Ditat (Prudence enriches)

Parliament of the United Kingdom
Preceded by Robert Scott	Member of Parliament for Penrith and The Border; 1955–1983	Succeeded by David Maclean
Political offices
Preceded by Alan Green	Parliamentary Secretary to the Ministry of Labour; 1962–1964	Office abolished
Preceded by Fred Peart	Leader of the House of Commons; 1970–1972	Succeeded by Robert Carr
Preceded by Fred Peart	Lord President of the Council; 1970–1972	Succeeded by Robert Carr
New office	Secretary of State for Northern Ireland; 1972–1973	Succeeded by Francis Pym
Preceded by Maurice Macmillan	Secretary of State for Employment; 1973–1974	Succeeded by Michael Foot
Preceded by Merlyn Rees	Home Secretary; 1979–1983	Succeeded by Leon Brittan
Preceded by The Baroness Young	Leader of the House of Lords; 1983–1988	Succeeded by The Lord Belstead
Preceded by John Biffen	Lord President of the Council; 1983–1988	Succeeded by John Wakeham
Party political offices
Preceded by John Hill	Conservative Deputy Chief Whip in the House of Commons; 1964	Succeeded by Brian Batsford
Preceded by Martin Redmayne	Conservative Chief Whip in the House of Commons; 1964–1970	Succeeded by Francis Pym
Preceded by The Lord Carrington	Chairman of the Conservative Party; 1974–1975	Succeeded by The Lord Thorneycroft
Vacant Title last held by Reginald Maudling	Deputy Leader of the Conservative Party; 1975–1991	Vacant Title next held by Peter Lilley
Preceded by The Baroness Young	Leader of the Conservative Party in the House of Lords; 1983–1988	Succeeded by The Lord Belstead
