= East Nidderdale Moors =

Protected area in North Yorkshire, England

Coordinates: 54.2°N 1.8°W

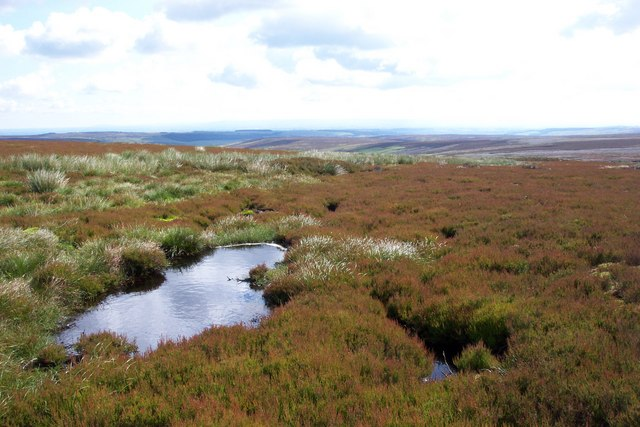
Pool on Masham moor, within East Nidderdale Moors SSSI

East Nidderdale Moors is a Site of Special Scientific Interest (SSSI) in the Pennines, North Yorkshire, England. Part of East Nidderdale Moors is within Yorkshire Dales National Park and part of it is within the Nidderdale National Landscape. East Nidderdale Moors extend from the peak of High Ruddes in the south (above the town of Pateley Bridge) to the peak of Flamstone Pin in the north (above the hamlet of Caldbergh). This area is protected because of the important moorland and peatland habitats here and because of the diversity of bird species.

The full name of this protected area is: East Nidderdale Moors (Flamstone Pin - High Ruckles) SSSI. One of the streams that flows through this protected area is called the River Burn. East Nidderdale Moors SSSI includes Colsterdale moor, Masham moor, Lofthouse moor, Dallowgill moor and Pateley moor.

== Biology ==
Moorland plant species include bell heather, cross-leaved heath, cranberry , bog asphodel, and round-leaved sundew. In wetter areas, plant species include bog pimpernel, bog pondweed , blinks , marsh pennywort, common butterwort, pale forget-me-not (Myosotis stoloinfera; genus Myosotis) and common twayblade. On peatland, moss species include Sphagnum papillosum and Sphagnum capillifolium. Woodlands around Birk Gill (that flows into Leighton Reservoir) are dominated by sessile oak trees.

Bird species include merlin, short-eared owl, red grouse, golden plover, curlew, snipe, redshank, ringed ouzel, peregrine, hen harrier and buzzard. There is a record of hen harriers breeding in East Nidderdale Moors in 1971.

== Land ownership ==
Part of the land within East Nidderdale Moors SSSI is owned by the National Trust (this protected area intersects with the Braithwaite Hall estate). Part of this protected area (Lofthouse Moor) is owned by the Ramsden family. In 2023, a member of the Ramsden landowning family was fined for burning vegetation that was on peat. The Swinton Estate also own land within East Nidderdale Moors SSSI.

== Raptor persecution ==
The moors around Nidderdale have a high level of raptor persecution. In 2019 a hen harrier was found shot on the Swinton Estate.
