= Warthermarske =

Hamlet in North Yorkshire, England

Coordinates: 54.20634°N 1.68397°W

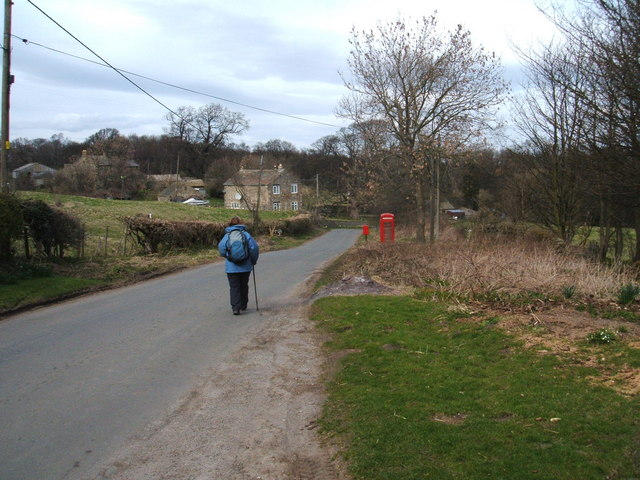
- Road through Warthermarske

- Location within North Yorkshire
- OS grid reference: SE207789
- Civil parish: Swinton with Warthermarske
- Unitary authority: North Yorkshire
- Ceremonial county: North Yorkshire
- Region: Yorkshire and the Humber
- Country: England
- Sovereign state: United Kingdom
- Police: North Yorkshire
- Fire: North Yorkshire
- Ambulance: Yorkshire

Warthermarske is a hamlet in the county of North Yorkshire, England. It is near Swinton, about 1 mile (2 km) south-west of Masham. The village is not far from the River Ure, which eventually runs through the small city of Ripon, which itself is a few miles south-east of Warthermarske.

The village is at the southern corner of the Swinton Park Estate and was formerly included with the village of Swinton as one township.

The hamlet used to be known as Wardenmask and its name derives from Old English with a Scandinavian influence; Wardonmersk which means Marsh at a Watch-Hill.

From 1974 to 2023 it was part of the Borough of Harrogate. It is now administered by the unitary North Yorkshire Council.
