= Dixons Cottingley Academy =

Location
- Cottingley New Road; Bingley; West Yorkshire, BD16 1TZ; England; 53.8304°N 1.8175°W

Information
- Type: Academy
- Local authority: Bradford
- Trust: Dixons Academies Trust Bradford
- Department for Education URN: 146198 Tables
- Ofsted: Reports
- Principal: Francesca Hitch
- Gender: Mixed
- Age: 11 to 16
- Enrolment: 872 as of November 2024
- Website: http://www.dixonsco.com

Dixons Cottingley Academy (formerly Samuel Lister Academy, Aire Valley School, Nab Wood School and originally Nab Wood Grammar School) is a mixed secondary school located in Cottingley, West Yorkshire, England.

Originally opened as Nab Wood Grammar School, later Nab Wood School, it was later a foundation school administered by Bradford City Council and the Nab Wood Community Trust. As Aire Valley School it converted to academy status in April 2012 and was renamed after Samuel Lister, 1st Baron Masham, an inventor and industrialist, notable for inventing the Lister nip comb. It was later renamed Dixons Cottingley Academy. The school is now sponsored by Dixons Academies Trust but continues to coordinate with the Bradford City Council for admissions. It was graded as a 'Good' school in November 2022 by Ofsted.

Dixons Cottingley Academy offers GCSEs and BTECs as programmes of study for pupils.

== Notable Alumni ==
Faisal Khan (Actor) known for being apart of the MCU in Agatha All Along as Wiccan and Eastenders

Umar Zaman (Politician)
