= Samuel Cunliffe Lister, 2nd Baron Masham =

English baron and industrialist

Coat of arms of Samuel Cunliffe Lister, 2nd Baron Masham

Crest
1st, a stag's head erased, per fesse proper and or, attired sable, Lister; 2nd, a greyhound sejant argent, collared sable, and charged on the shoulder with a pellet, Cunliffe.
Escutcheon
Quarterly, 1st and 9th ermine, on a fesse sable three mullets or, Lister; 2nd and 3rd, sable, three conies courant argent, Cathie.
Supporters
Dexter, a stag or, attired sable, gorged with a collar of the last, pendent therefrom an escutcheon of the arms of Lister; sinister, a greyhound argent, gorged with a collar sable, pendent therefrom an escut-cheon of the arms of Cunliffe.
Motto
Retinens Vestigia Famae (Following in the Footsteps of Our Fame)

Samuel Cunliffe Lister, 2nd Baron Masham (1857-24 January 1917) was an English baron and industrialist.

He was born in 1857, the son of Samuel Lister, 1st Baron Masham, and was educated at Harrow and St John's College, Oxford. Like his father, who he succeeded to the peerage in 1906, he was a prominent Yorkshire industrialist.

He never married, and on his death, his title was inherited by his younger brother, John Cunliffe Lister, 3rd Baron Masham.

Peerage of the United Kingdom
Preceded by Samuel Lister	Baron Masham; 2nd creation 1906–1917	Succeeded by John Lister
