= Baron Masham =

Barony in the Peerage of Great Britain

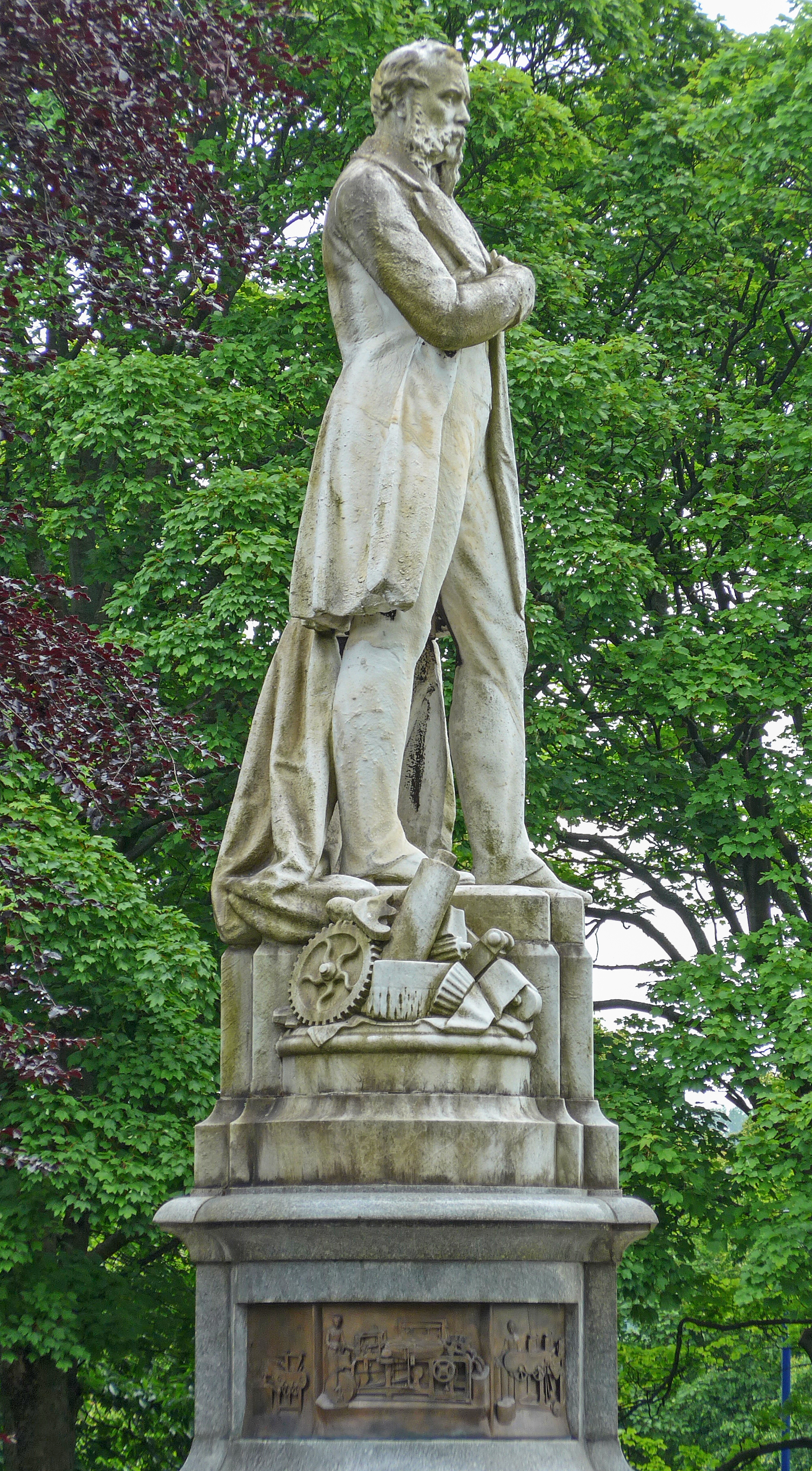
Statue of Samuel Lister, 1st Baron Masham

Baron Masham is a title that has been created three times, once in the Peerage of Great Britain and twice in the Peerage of the United Kingdom. It was first created in the Peerage of Great Britain in 1712 when the courtier Samuel Masham was made Baron Masham, of Otes. In 1723 he also succeeded as fourth Baronet of High Lever. The barony became extinct on the death of the second Baron in 1776. The Masham baronetcy, of High Lever in the County of Essex, had been created by James I in the Baronetage of England on 20 December 1621 for Samuel Masham. The third Baronet was Member of Parliament for Essex. The baronetcy became extinct along with the barony in 1776.

It was created for a second time in the Peerage of the United Kingdom in 1891, when the industrialist Samuel Lister was made Baron Masham, of Swinton in the County of York. This creation became extinct upon the death of the third Baron in 1924.

It was created for at third time in the Peerage of the United Kingdom in 1955 when the Conservative politician Philip Cunliffe-Lister, 1st Viscount Swinton, was made Baron Masham, of Ellington in the County of York. He was created Earl of Swinton at the same time. Born Philip Lloyd Grame, he was the husband of Mary Constance Cunliffe-Lister, granddaughter of the first Baron of the 1891 creation, and had assumed the surname of Cunliffe-Lister in 1924 when his wife succeeded to the substantial Masham estates. Susan Cunliffe-Lister, wife of the second Earl of Swinton, was created a life peer as Baroness Masham of Ilton in her own right in 1970.

Note: there is an older, separate title Baron Scrope of Masham that belongs to the Scrope family. It is in abeyance since 1517.

== Baron Masham, first creation ==
=== Masham baronets, of High Lever (1621) ===
- Sir William Masham, 1st Baronet (c. 1592 – c. 1656)
  - William Masham
- Sir William Masham, 2nd Baronet (d. c. 1663)
- Sir Francis Masham, 3rd Baronet (c. 1646 – 1723)
- Sir Samuel Masham, 4th Baronet (c. 1679 – 1758) (created Baron Masham in 1712)

=== Baron Masham (1712) ===
- Samuel Masham, 1st Baron Masham (c. 1679 – 1758)
  - Abigail Masham, Baroness Masham (c. 1670 – 1734), his wife and favourite of Queen Anne
- Samuel Masham, 2nd Baron Masham (1712–1776)

=== Title succession chart ===
Title succession chart, Masham baronets and Barons Masham (first creation).

Sir William Masham; 1st Baronet c. 1592 – c. 1656
William Masham
Sir William Masham; 2nd Baronet d. c. 1663	Sir Francis Masham; 3rd Baronet c. 1646 – 1723
Baron Masham (1712)
Samuel Masham; 1st Baron Masham; 4th Baronet c. 1679 – 1758	Francis Masham; 1686–1731
Samuel Masham; 2nd Baron Masham; 5th Baronet; 1712–1776
Baronetcy and barony extinct

== Baron Masham, second and third creations ==
=== Second creation (1891) ===
- Samuel Cunliffe Lister, 1st Baron Masham (1815–1906)
- Samuel Cunliffe Lister, 2nd Baron Masham (1857–1917)
- John Cunliffe Lister, 3rd Baron Masham (1867–1924)

=== Third creation (1955) ===
- see Earl of Swinton

=== Title succession chart ===
Title succession chart, Viscounts Swinton, Earls of Swinton and Barons Masham (2nd and 3rd creations).

Baron Masham (2nd creation), 1891
Samuel Lister; 1815–1906; 1st Baron Masham
Samuel Cunliffe-Lister; 1857–1917; 2nd Baron Masham	Mary (Cunliffe-Lister) Boynton; 1859–1896	John Cunliffe-Lister; 1867–1924; 3rd Baron Masham
Viscount Swinton, 1935; Earl of Swinton and Baron Masham (3rd creation), 1955	Barony Masham extinct
Philip (Lloyd-Greame) Cunliffe-Lister; 1884–1972; 1st Earl of Swinton, etc.	Mary Boynton died 1975
Maj. John Cunliffe-Lister; 1913–1943
David Cunliffe-Lister; 1937–2006; 2nd Earl of Swinton, etc.	Nicholas Cunliffe-Lister; 1939–2021; 3rd Earl of Swinton
Mark Cunliffe-Lister b. 1970; 4th Earl of Swinton
William Cunliffe-Lister b. 2004 styled Lord Masham
