= Nicholas Cunliffe-Lister, 3rd Earl of Swinton =

British noble (1939–2021)

The Right Honourable The Earl of Swinton
- Predecessor: David Cunliffe-Lister, 2nd Earl of Swinton
- Successor: Mark William Philip Cunliffe-Lister, 4th Earl of Swinton
- Born: 4 September 1939
- Died: 21 March 2024 (aged 84)

Nicholas John Cunliffe-Lister, 3rd Earl of Swinton (4 September 1939 – 21 March 2021), styled the Hon. Nicholas Cunliffe-Lister from 1955 to 2006, was a British peer.

The younger grandson of the first Earl, he became Earl of Swinton on the death of his older brother, the 2nd Earl, on 26 March 2006. Their father, Major the Hon. John Yarburgh Cunliffe-Lister, the son and heir of Philip Cunliffe-Lister, 1st Earl of Swinton, had been killed in action in 1943.

== Family ==
Swinton's first wife was the Hon. Elizabeth Susan Whitelaw, eldest daughter of the 1st Viscount Whitelaw, whom he married in 1966. She was appointed Lord Lieutenant of the East Riding of Yorkshire in July 2005.

He had two sons and one daughter by his first wife:

1. Lady Lorna Mary Cunliffe-Lister (1968–2023) married 2001 to William Parker.
2. Mark William Philip Cunliffe-Lister, 4th Earl of Swinton, previously styled Lord Masham (born 15 September 1970), who has been married since 17 June 2000 to Felicity C. Shadbolt. The couple have bought back and restored Swinton Park. They have two sons and one daughter. Lady Swinton is an elected Liberal Democrat member of North Yorkshire Council.
3. The Hon. Simon Charles Cunliffe-Lister (born 1977), now of Burton Agnes Hall

Before he became Lord Swinton, Cunliffe-Lister and Susan Whitelaw divorced, and in 1996 he married secondly Pamela June Wood, the former wife of Jeremy Sykes, of the Sykes family of Sledmere.

Swinton died in March 2021 at the age of 81. He was succeeded in the earldom by his eldest son, the Honourable Mark William Philip Cunliffe-Lister, previously styled Lord Masham.

Peerage of the United Kingdom
Preceded by David Cunliffe-Lister	Earl of Swinton; 2006–2021	Succeeded by Mark Cunliffe-Lister
Preceded by David Cunliffe-Lister	Viscount Swinton; 2006–2021	Succeeded by Mark Cunliffe-Lister
Preceded by David Cunliffe-Lister	Baron Masham; 3rd creation 2006–2021	Succeeded by Mark Cunliffe-Lister
