= Swinton, Harrogate =

Village in North Yorkshire, England

Coordinates: 54.213°N 1.672°W

Swinton
- Location within North Yorkshire
- Population: 200 (2011)
- OS grid reference: SE213795
- Civil parish: Swinton with Warthermarske
- Unitary authority: North Yorkshire
- Ceremonial county: North Yorkshire
- Region: Yorkshire and the Humber
- Country: England
- Sovereign state: United Kingdom
- Post town: RIPON
- Postcode district: HG4
- Police: North Yorkshire
- Fire: North Yorkshire
- Ambulance: Yorkshire

Swinton is a small village in the county of North Yorkshire, England. It is situated to the immediate south-west of Masham and separated from it by the River Burn. The village is at the eastern end of Swinton Park and shares a civil parish with Warthermarske.

The village is mentioned in the Domesday Book as belonging to Count Alan and the names derives from the Old English swīn-tūn which means Pig-Farm.

Until 1974 it was part of the West Riding of Yorkshire. From 1974 to 2023 it was part of the Borough of Harrogate, it is now administered by the unitary North Yorkshire Council.
