= Swinton Estate =

Country house, now hotel, near Masham, Yorkshire, England

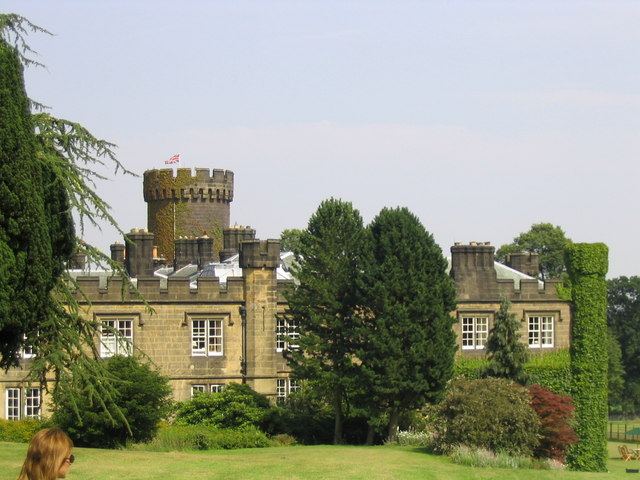

- Location within North Yorkshire
- 54°12′47.2″N 1°40′43.0″W
- Location: North Yorkshire
- OS grid reference: SE 21290 79847

Site notes
- Area: 20,000 acres (8,100 ha)

Listed Building – Grade II*
- Official name: Register of Historic Parks and Gardens
- Type: Grade II*
- Designated: 1984

The Swinton Estate is a large privately owned estate in North Yorkshire, England. It comprises some 20,000 acres (8,100 ha) of countryside in the Nidderdale Area of Outstanding Natural Beauty, extending 10 miles (16 km) west from the River Ure near Masham. The estate includes Swinton Park, the seat of the Danby family and (from 1882) of the Cunliffe-Lister family (the Earls of Swinton), an English country house in Swinton near Masham. It is set in 200 acres (81 ha) of parkland, lakes and gardens. The house is a Grade II* listed building, and now operates as the 42-bedroom Swinton Park Hotel.

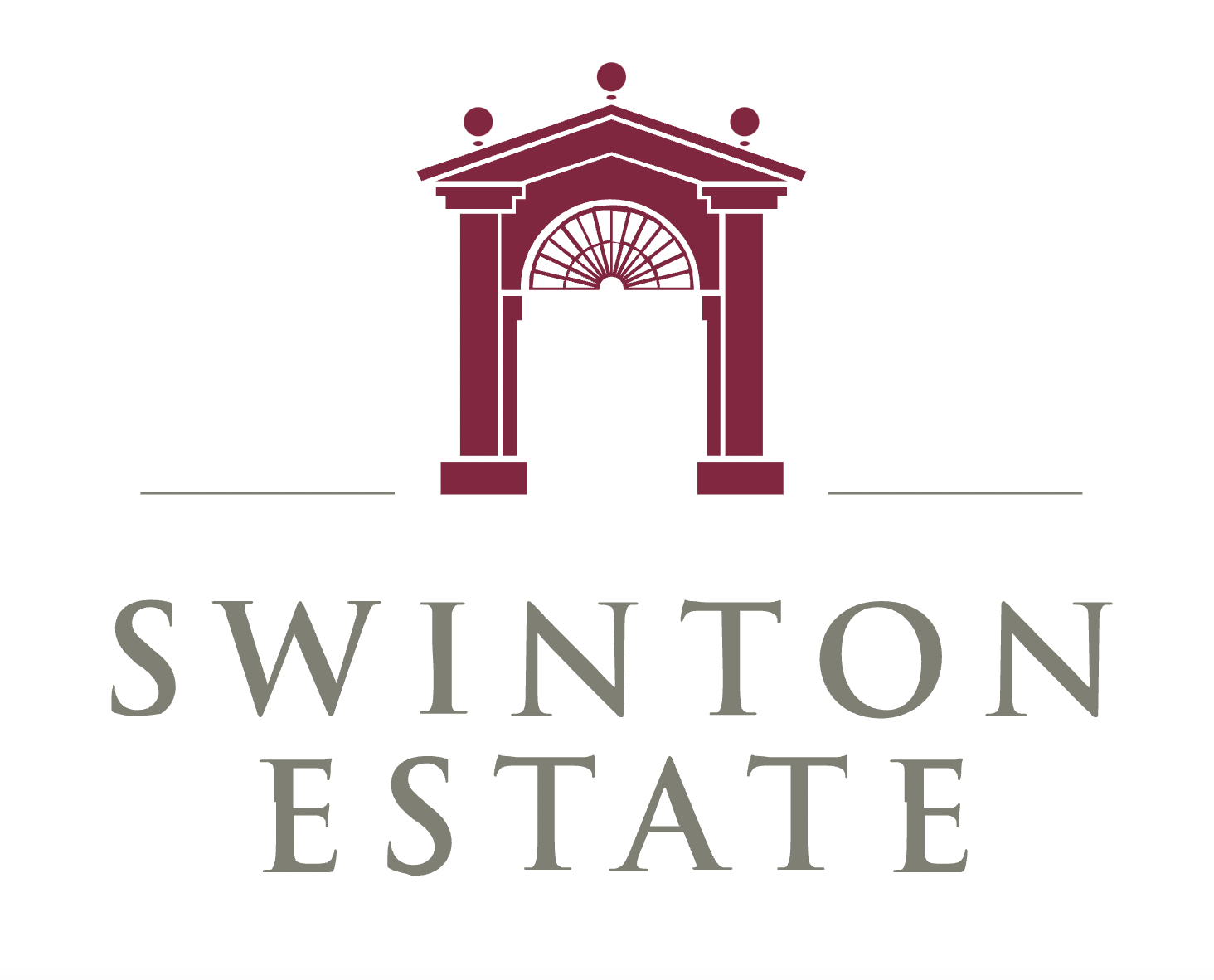
Swinton Estate

The Cunliffe-Lister family still own the house but the seat of the Earl of Swinton which was at Dykes Hill House, also located near Masham has now been sold .

Beyond the parkland surrounding the house, the estate comprises farmland and large areas of grouse moor in and around the valley of the River Burn.

== History ==
The construction at Swinton Park was commenced in 1695 by Sir Abstrupus Danby (1655–1727). His successors built the stable block and gatehouse and, during the 1760s, planted the parkland and created the chain of five lakes.

William Danby (1752–1833) almost entirely rebuilt the house, at first by John Carr, architect of York, in 1764–1767. Danby altered and extended the house, giving it the Gothic aspect it retains, in two building campaigns, to designs of the Yorkshire mason-architect John Foss of Richmond (1745–1827), who became a close personal friend. In the first, of 1791–1796, the north range was added. A design for the Drawing Room, at least, was contributed by James Wyatt. In a second building campaign, of 1813–1814, again under the direction of Foss, the south wing was built. The house included a handsome library.

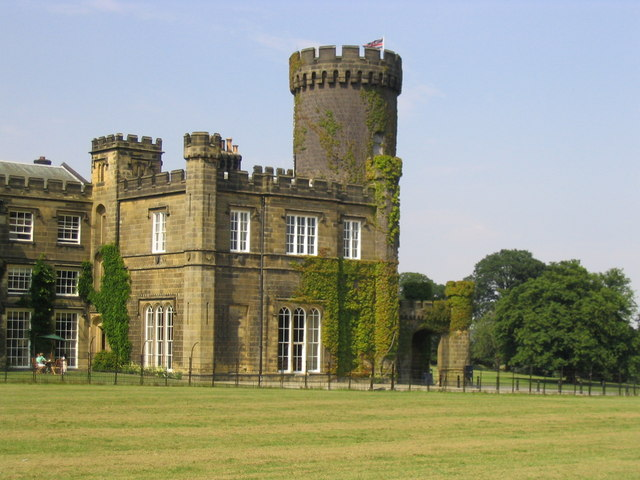
Swinton Park

Danby was not finished: further Gothic alterations were effected by Robert Lugar: turrets and battlements were added, so that the building took on the appearance of a castle; the richly furnished museum of minerals, which has since become a family chapel, was built, and at the same time a tower Describing a tour which he made in 1829, the poet Robert Southey remarked, "The most interesting person whom I saw during this expedition was Mr Danby of Swinton Park, a man of very large fortune, and now very old." During the early 19th century the building was substantially altered, and two-storey west and north wings were added. Danby died in 1833, but his widow continued to live at the house with her second husband, naval officer Octavius Vernon Harcourt (High Sheriff for 1849) until her own death in 1879. She devised her Yorkshire estates to George, fifth son of Sir Robert Affleck, Bt., a member of the family of William Danby's mother, who then took the name Danby.

The castle was bought in 1888 by Samuel Cunliffe-Lister, who added a third floor and enlarged the dining room. Samuel's granddaughter Molly and her husband Philip came to live at Swinton in 1924 and took the name of Cunliffe-Lister. Philip was created Viscount Swinton in 1935 and the 1st Earl of Swinton in 1955. During the Second World War, Harrogate Ladies College occupied part of the premises. In 1974 Molly Cunliffe-Lister died, and the castellated house was rented out.

From 1976 to 1998, the castle was occupied by the Lindley Educational Trust. Mark Cunliffe-Lister, the great-grandson of Molly, along with his mother, brother and sister, bought back the castle in May 2000. On 17 June 2000 Mark and Felicity (styled by courtesy as Lord and Lady Masham) married. After their honeymoon, they moved to Swinton and set up the family business here. The 42 bedroom luxury castle hotel was opened in 2001, having undergone extensive refurbishment. The hotel was featured on the BBC television series Amazing Hotels: Life Beyond the Lobby.

== Architecture ==
=== House ===
The house is built of stone with embattled parapets and hipped stone slate roofs, and consists of a main range and recessed wings. The east front has three storeys, and five bays, with an octagonal tower at each end. In the centre is a four-storey round tower with a porte cochère and round-headed sash windows. Elsewhere, the windows are mullioned, with sashes and hood moulds. The north wing has three storeys, twelve bays and octagonal towers.

Inside, the drawing room on the ground floor is in neoclassical style, and retains its original plasterwork and chimneypiece. Along with the two adjoining rooms, it was designed by James Wyatt. On the first floor is a panelled room, designed by John Carr. The rear wing has a three-storey 19th-century staircase.

=== Stables ===
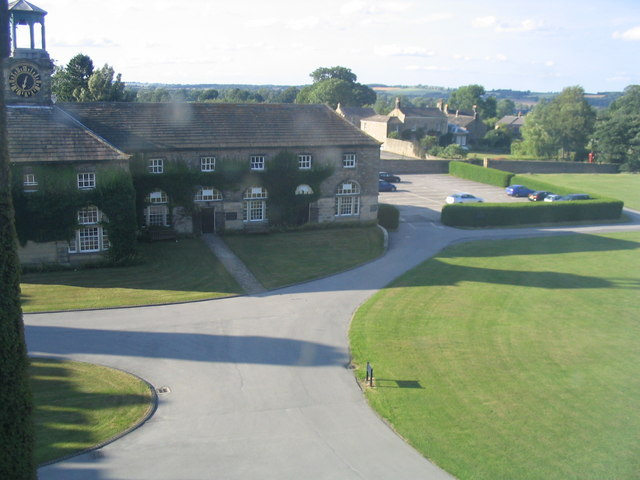
The stables

The grade II listed stable building has been converted into a cookery school. It is built of stone, and has a hipped stone slate roof with shaped kneelers. There are two storeys and 13 bays, the middle three bays projecting. All the ground floor bays have semicircular heads, moulded architraves, impost bands and lunette windows. Some contain a tripartite sash window with a Diocletian window above, some are infilled, and the centre bay is blind. The upper floor has quoins, and contains sash windows in moulded architraves. On the roof is a square stone clock turret on a plinth, with a segmental cornice carrying an octagonal arched wooden cupola with keystones and plain columns on a two-stepped plinth, with a cornice, a lead hipped roof, a ball finial and a weathervane.

=== Gatehouse ===
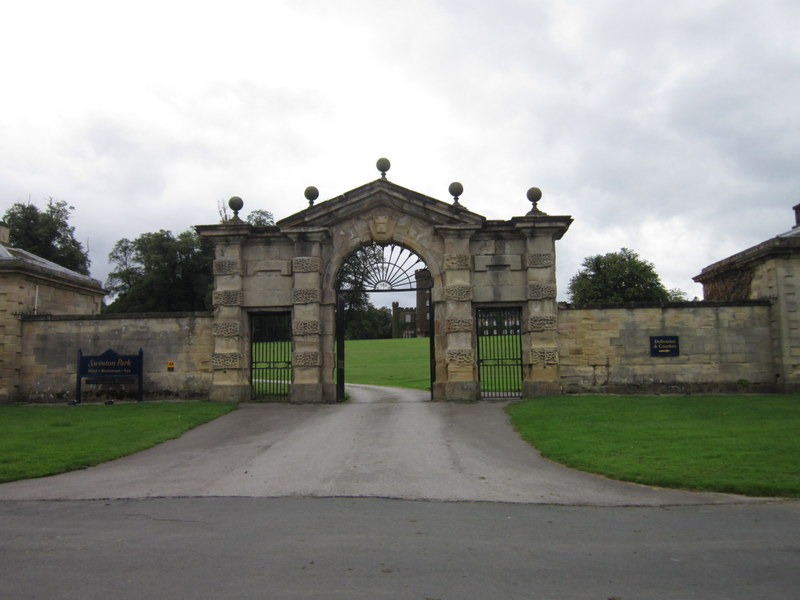
The gatehouse

The grade II-listed building is in stone with stone slate roofs, and consists of a central carriage arch flanked by pedestrian gates, that are linked by curtain walls to the lodges. The gateway has four vermiculated rusticated pilasters, and the carriage arch has a moulded surround, and a double keystone with a carved head. Above is a cornice, an open pediment and ball finials. The gates are in wrought iron. The lodges each has two storeys and two bays, quoins, moulded cornices, a parapet and a pyramidal roof. The windows are sashes, those on the upper floor with architraves and keystones.

== Gardens and park ==
The earliest record of the gardens dates from 1699 when a design by George London was laid out, with fountains added a few years later. A model for a summer house by the carpenter and architect William Thornton was approved by Sir Abstrupus in 1700. This formal plan was swept away, probably by William Danby during his landscaping programme in the 1760s that resulted in the present English landscape garden. In the next years, five lakes were dug out.

The Gothick alterations were accompanied by the Quarry Gill Bridge completed in 1822, also to designs by Foss. During the 1880s a stone bridge was built at Coffin Pond.

The park and garden was listed Grade II* on the Register of Historic Parks and Gardens in 1984.

The parkland supports a herd of approximately 120 fallow deer.

== The estate ==
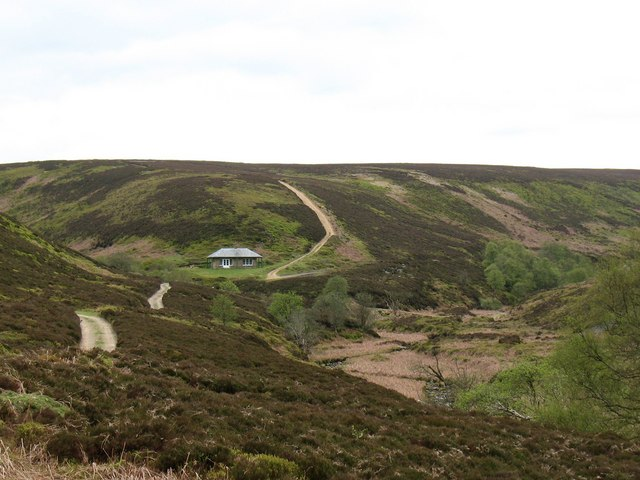
Shooting box on the Swinton Estate moors

The wider estate comprises farmland, woodland and moorland, as well as properties in the town of Masham and nearby villages. The farmland is farmed by more than 50 tenants, with sheep farming predominant. There are some 2,000 acres (810 ha) of mixed coniferous and broad-leaved woodland.

The estate has more than 8,000 acres (3,200 ha) of heather moors, which are managed for grouse shooting, with pheasant shooting on the lower ground. Most of the moorland falls within the East Nidderdale Moors Site of Special Scientific Interest, and also within the North Pennine Moors Special Area of Conservation (SAC) and Special Protection Area (SPA). The moors are open access land following the Countryside and Rights of Way Act 2000.

The moors are habitat for ground nesting birds, including the hen harrier, which has generated controversy for potential conflict with grouse shoot management. In 2014 a gamekeeper on the Swinton Estate was convicted of setting an illegal pole trap. In 2018 a hen harrier was found shot on the Swinton Estate and another in 2019. According to the Moorland Association there was no evidence of wrongdoing by the estate, and the estate has encouraged the winter roosting and breeding of hen harriers on its land.

== See also ==
- Grade II* listed buildings in North Yorkshire (district)
- Listed buildings in Swinton with Warthermarske
