= Samuel Lister, 1st Baron Masham =

English inventor and industrialist

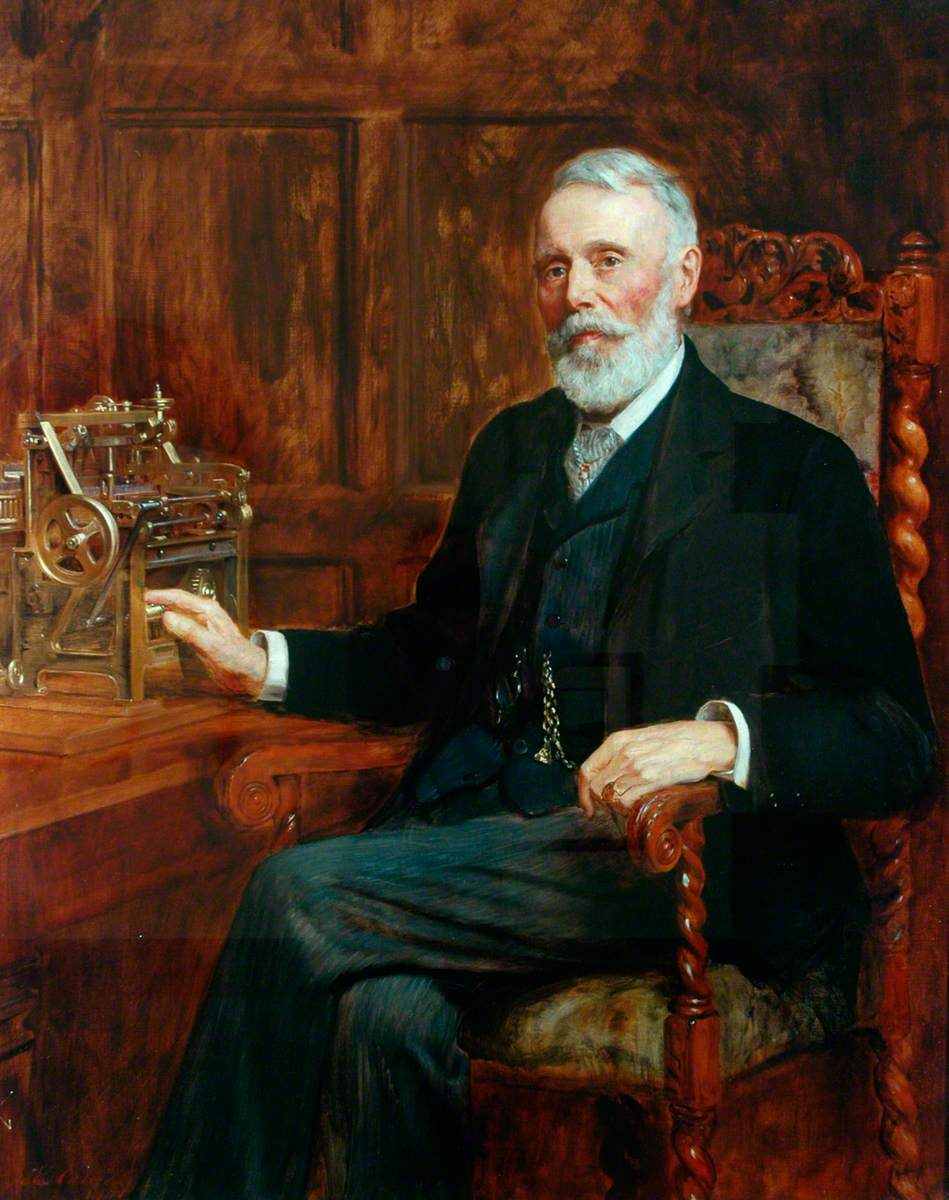
Samuel Lister, 1st Baron Masham, with a model of one of his inventions, 1901 portrait by John Collier

Samuel Cunliffe Lister, 1st Baron Masham (1 January 1815 – 2 February 1906), was an English inventor and industrialist, notable for inventing the Lister nip comb.

== Early life ==
He was born in Calverley Hall (now Calverley House Farm- not to be confused with the medieval manor of the same name), near Bradford, the son of Ellis Cunliffe Lister (1774–1853), the first Member of Parliament elected for Bradford after the Reform Act 1832 (2 & 3 Will. 4. c. 45), and Mary (née Kay) Lister. In 1854 he married Anne Dearden, daughter of John Dearden; they had five daughters. He started his working life working for a Liverpool firm of merchants.

== Industry and enterprise ==
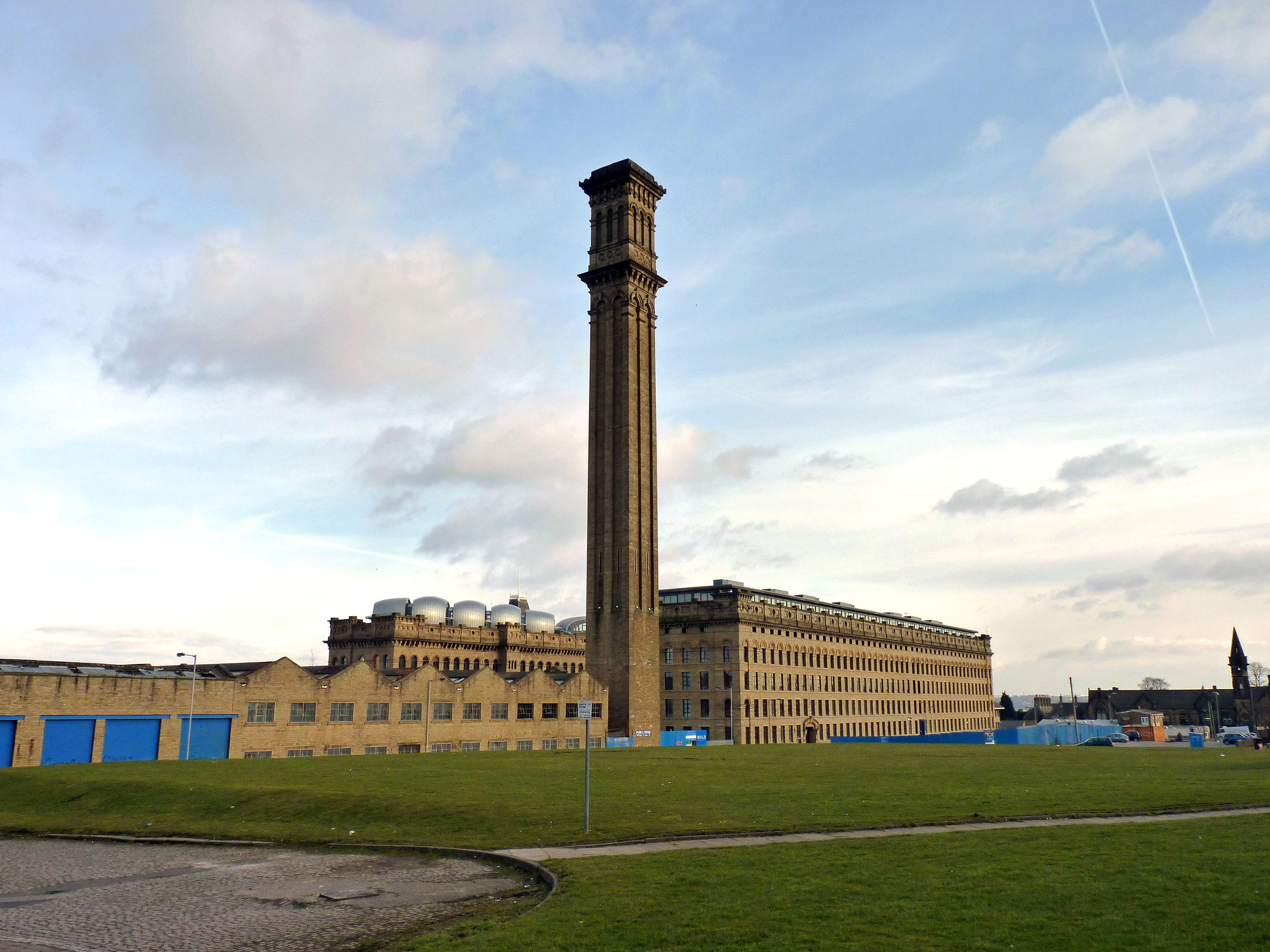
Lister's Mill

Lister went on to play a key role in the development of Bradford's wool industry during the nineteenth century Industrial Revolution. The textile industry transformed Bradford from a small rural town into a rich and famous city. As well as being a successful mill owner he occasionally diverged to other subjects, such as an air brake for railways. He was fond of outdoor sports, especially coursing and shooting, and was a keen patron of the fine arts.

In 1838 he and his elder brother John started as worsted spinners and manufacturers in a new mill which their father built for them at Manningham. Lister's Mill (otherwise known as Manningham Mills), and its owner, were particularly well known in the district. The business eventually made Lister one of Bradford's most famous fathers, a multi-millionaire and the provider of thousands of jobs in the city. Lister's Mill changed the identity of the region, and its economy. Lister himself came to epitomise Victorian enterprise. However it has been suggested that his capitalist attitude made trade unions necessary.

== Textiles ==
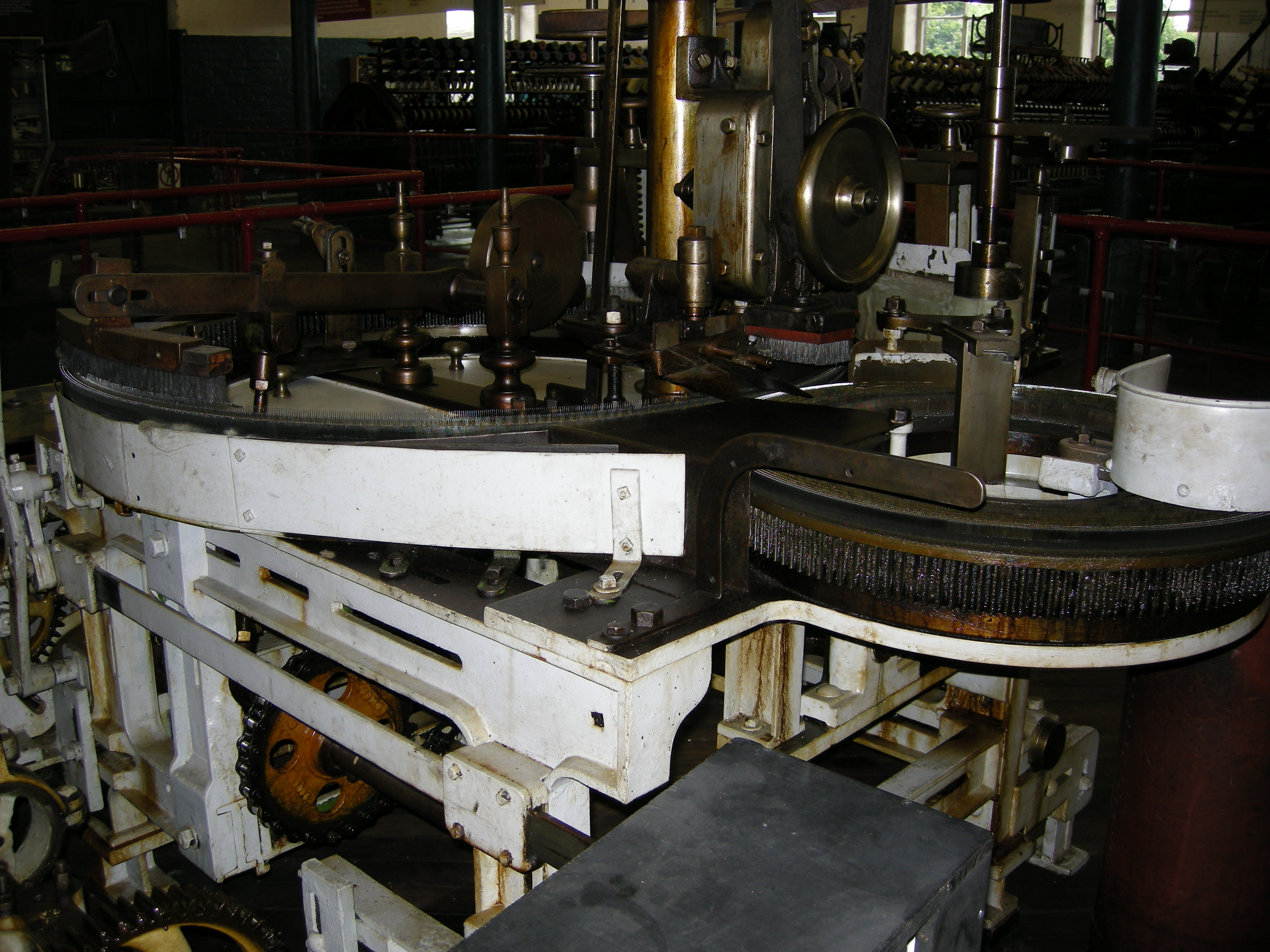
Lister nip comb in Bradford Industrial Museum

Lister invented the Lister nip comb which separated and straightened raw wool, which has to be done before it can be spun into worsted yarn, and in the nineteenth century it was a hot, dirty and tiring job. By inventing the nip comb, Lister revolutionised the industry.

Around 1855 he began work to find a way of utilising the fibre contained in silk waste. The task occupied his time for many years and brought him to the verge of bankruptcy, but at last he succeeded in perfecting silk-combing appliances which enabled him to make good quality yarn at a low cost. Another important invention in connection with silk manufacture was a velvet loom patent that he bought in 1867 to the Catalan inventor Jacint Barrau. The new loom was built at Manningham Mills by Jaume Reixach, Barrau's foreman and Lister's Mill director afterwards, and made him very rich. However, the business was seriously affected by the prohibitory duties imposed by the United States, making him an early critic of the British policy of free trade.

== 1891 Manningham Mills Strike ==
On 9 December 1890 Lister’s posted a notice at Manningham Mill reducing their workers wages by up to 35%. The company said the reason was tariffs on silk products introduced that year by the United States. Before the introduction of the tariff the value of Lister’s exports to the US had been £300,000 – in 1890 it fell to £4,000. There were other factors in the loss of income from silk, including cheap German products, a tariff by France and that the material was going out of fashion.

Lister wrote several letters to the press criticising his work force, thereby antagonising them. Lister then offered to pay weavers in some departments more than others – this was refused by the workers. At a later meeting with Lister, the workers offered to accept an average of the wages paid by six other textile manufacturers in Bradford – Lister did not accept this. On 16 December 1890, a strike was called.

The strike became a national controversy. An appeal for funds raised over £11,000 for the strikers. Strike meetings attracted up to 90,000 people which resulted in the Watch Committee (Local authority politicians in charge of the police) to ban open air meetings. On Sunday 12 April 1891, the Trade Council organised a meeting in Bradford town centre which was cleared by the police. The following day, large crowds gathered in the town centre protesting about what they saw as an attempt to limit free speech. This was cleared by police baton charges and soldiers with fixed bayonets.

Strikers returned to work in stages during April and on the 27th the strike ended in defeat for the workers.

In May 1891 the strike leaders formed the Bradford Labour Union; the following year the Union changed its name to the Bradford Independent Labour Party (BILP). The BILP was one of the forerunners of the modern Labour Party.

== Honours ==
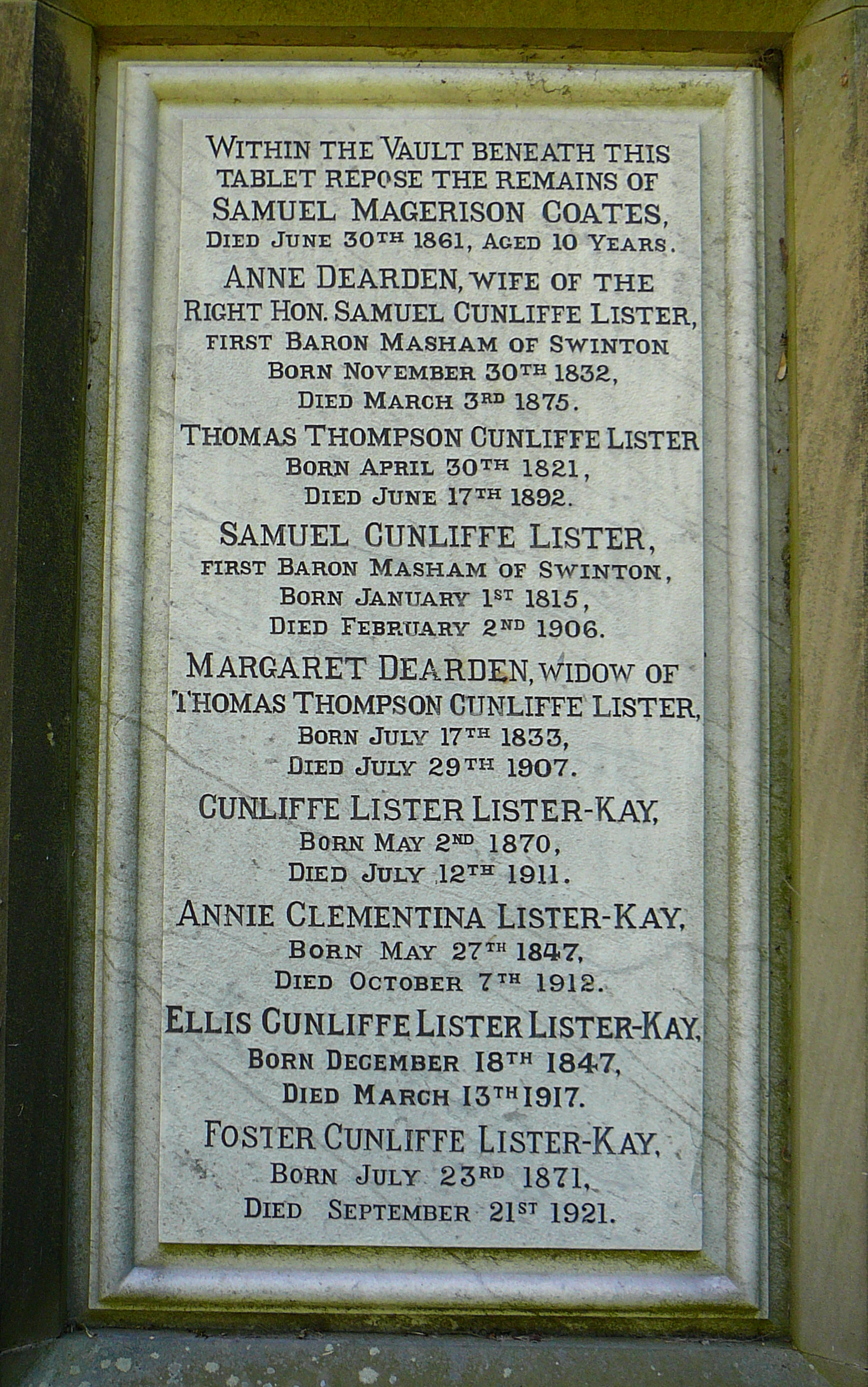
Memorial plaque of Samuel Lister and family

In 1887 he was appointed High Sheriff of Yorkshire.

In 1891 he was made a peer; he took his title from the little Yorkshire town of Masham, close to which is Swinton Park, purchased by him in 1888. In 1898, Lister was awarded the freedom of the City of Bradford.

He died at Swinton Park on 2 February 1906, and was succeeded by his son, Samuel Cunliffe Lister, 2nd Baron Masham.

== Lister Park ==
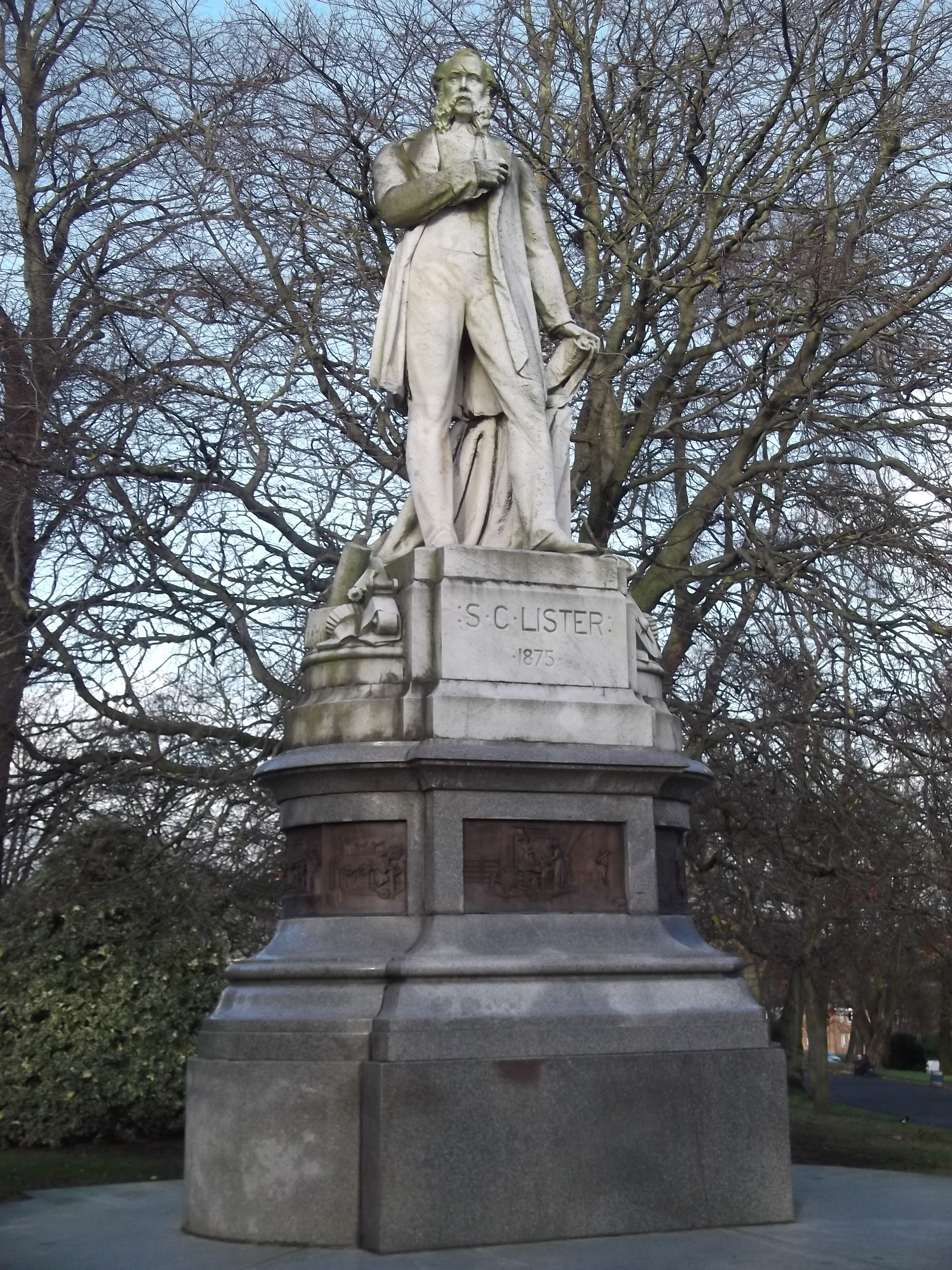
The statue of Lister in Bradford's Lister Park depicts him standing with a two-foot rule clasped across his chest.

A statue of him now stands in Lister Park, in Manningham, Bradford, West Yorkshire, sculpted by Matthew Noble from a block of white Sicilian marble and unveiled on Saturday 15 May 1875 by W. E. Forster, then Member of Parliament for Bradford. Lister Park was donated to the people of Bradford by Lister.

== Arms ==
Coat of arms of Samuel Lister, 1st Baron Masham

Crest
1st, a stag's head erased, per fesse proper and or, attired sable, Lister; 2nd, a greyhound sejant argent, collared sable, and charged on the shoulder with a pellet, Cunliffe.
Escutcheon
Quarterly, 1st and 9th ermine, on a fesse sable three mullets or, Lister; 2nd and 3rd, sable, three conies courant argent, Cathie.
Supporters
Dexter, a stag or, attired sable, gorged with a collar of the last, pendent therefrom an escutcheon of the arms of Lister; sinister, a greyhound argent, gorged with a collar sable, pendent therefrom an escut-cheon of the arms of Cunliffe.
Motto
Retinens Vestigia Famae (Following In The Footsteps Of Our Fame)

== See also ==
- Samuel Lister Academy

Peerage of the United Kingdom
New creation	Baron Masham; 2nd creation 1891–1906	Succeeded by Samuel Cunliffe Lister
