= Listed buildings in Boroughbridge =

Boroughbridge is a civil parish in the county of North Yorkshire, England. It contains 76 listed buildings that are recorded in the National Heritage List for England. Of these, one is listed at Grade I, the highest of the three grades, one is at Grade II*, the middle grade, and the others are at Grade II, the lowest grade. The parish contains the town of Boroughbridge, the villages of Aldborough and Minskip, and the surrounding area. Most of the listed buildings are houses, cottages and associated structures, shops and offices, and the others include churches, items in churchyards, a village cross, a bridge, public houses, farmhouses and farm buildings, a former court house, a milepost, two telephone kiosks, and a set of stocks.

== Key ==
Grade	Criteria
I	Buildings of exceptional interest, sometimes considered to be internationally important
II*	Particularly important buildings of more than special interest
II	Buildings of national importance and special interest

== Buildings ==
Name and location	Photograph	Date	Notes	Grade
Former cottages, Hall Square; 54.09534°N 1.39468°W	—	13th century	A group of former cottages on a corner site, some converted into shops. They are in rendered brick with roofs of Welsh slate and tile, and have two storeys. There are three bays on High Street and five on Market Square. On the corner is an ornate entrance with pilasters and a hood, flanked on each front by a modern bow window. On High Street there is a doorway flanked by canted bay windows with a bracketed cornice, and on the Market Square front are two shopfronts. In the upper floor, most of the windows are sashes, some in architraves, and on High Street there are two casement windows.	II
St Andrew's Church, Aldborough; 54.09220°N 1.38073°W		1333	The oldest surviving part of the church is a chantry chapel, with the building gradually rebuilt, including the reconstruction of the south aisle in 1827. It is built in red sandstone with a lead roof, and consists of a nave with a clerestory, north and south aisles, a chancel, a north chapel, and a west tower. The tower has angle buttresses, a west window with a pointed arch and hood mould, a clock face on the west side, two-light bell openings, and an embattled parapet. The east window has five lights and is in Perpendicular style.	I
Memorial slab 54.09198°N 1.38084°W	—	14th century	The memorial slab is in the churchyard of St Andrew's Church, Aldborough. It consists of a stone about 7 feet (2.1 m) long and 9 inches (230 mm) high, raised on bricks. On it is a weathered relief depicting the bust of a woman with her arms folded across her chest, set in a roundel.	II
Village Cross; 54.09257°N 1.38201°W		14th century (possible)	The cross, which has been moved from elsewhere, is in stone. It consists of four diagonal shafts with spurs between, in three diminishing stages, with moulded capitals. The shafts of the middle stage have crocketed capitals, and the top stage has an ill-fitting crocketed capital.	II
Borough Bridge; 54.09741°N 1.39542°W		1562	The bridge carries the B6265 road over the River Ure, and has subsequently been widened, including in 1784 by John Carr. It is in sandstone, and consists of three segmental arches. There are two pointed cutwaters on the east side and semicircular cutwaters on the west, carried up as buttresses. Under the arches are five wide ribs. The parapets continue beyond the bridge to the north, and have square terminals.	II
Manor Cottage; 54.09271°N 1.38197°W		Late 16th century (probable)	The cottage is timber framed and, apart from the upper floor on the front, has been encased in reddish-brown brick, and has a pantile roof, with raised brick verges and corbelled out at the gable ends. There are two storeys, two bays, and extensions at both ends. The timber framing in the upper floor is close studded, and the windows are casements.	II
The Ship Inn; 54.09255°N 1.38054°W		Late 16th century (probable)	The public house, which has been altered and extended, has a timber-framed core, it is encased in brick, whitewashed and partly rendered, and has a pantile roof and a gable with bargeboards. There are two storeys and an L-shaped plan. The gable end faces the road, and contains a porch and two square bay windows. On the east front are horizontally-sliding sash windows, and inside there is an inglenook fireplace.	II
Aldborough Hall; 54.09238°N 1.37740°W	—	c. 1628–29	A large house in red brick, with stone dressings, quoins, and a Welsh slate roof. There are three storeys and attics, twin gables on the front and rear, and a full-height gabled bay projecting from the centre on three sides. On the west side is a three-storey canted bay window with an embattled parapet. The windows are mullioned and transomed.	II*
Walls and gateway, Aldborough Hall; 54.09260°N 1.37672°W	—	17th century (probable)	The wall to the northeast of the house is in red brick. It has an open, quasi-balustraded frieze on the upper part, it is surmounted by a scalloped shaped parapet divided by tall square brick piers with ball finials, and it contains a Tudor arched gateway.	II
Boroughbridge Hall; 54.09596°N 1.39392°W		17th century	A large house that has been altered. It is in rendered brick with pilasters, a sill band and a hipped tile roof. There are two storeys and eleven bays. On the front is a porch, and the windows are sashes.	II
Studforth Farmhouse; 54.08979°N 1.38091°W	—	17th century (probable)	The farmhouse is in reddish-brown brick and has a pantile roof. There are two storeys and three bays, with the gable end facing the street. On the front are two doorways, and the windows are casements with segmental-arched heads.	II
The Black Bull; 54.09416°N 1.39567°W		17th century (probable)	The public house has a timber-framed core, the exterior is rendered, and it has a swept Welsh slate roof and gables with bargeboards. There are two storeys and a front of two bays. In the centre is a doorway with pilasters, flanked by canted bay windows, with two storeys on the right and one on the left. The other windows are casements.	II
Stocks House; 54.09085°N 1.38041°W	—	Late 17th to 18th century	Probably originally a barn, later converted into a house, it is in reddish-brown brick, on a plinth, with cogged eaves and a swept pantile roof. There is one storey and an attic, and five bays. On the front is a canted bay window with a hipped tile roof, the other windows are casements, and there is a modern flat dormer.	II
Aldborough Manor; 54.09285°N 1.38318°W		Early 18th century (probable)	A former manor house that was remodelled and extended in about 1840. It is rendered, and has a hipped roof, a main block of three storeys and five bays, and an L-shaped plan, with a right wing of two storeys and five bays. The right bay of the main block is bowed, and contains a Doric porch in antis, above which are sash windows with pilasters and entablatures. The other windows are sashes in architraves and have lintels with keystones, those in the upper floor breaking through the former eaves cornice.	II
Galen Cottage; 54.09566°N 1.39465°W		Early 18th century	The cottage, which incorporates an earlier cottage on the right, is in rendered brick, with dentilled eaves, and a pantile roof with raised verges. There are two storeys and two bays, and the lower two-storey two-bay former cottage forms a wing to the right. In the centre is a modern porch, flanked by canted bay windows with hipped roofs, and above are casement windows. The wing contains a garage door and a dentilled bow window, and above are horizontally-sliding sash windows.	II
Gardener's Cottage; 54.09280°N 1.38227°W	—	Early 18th century	The cottage is in reddish-brown brick, with a stepped floor band, dentilled eaves, and a swept pantile roof with raised brick verges. There are two storeys and two bays. In the right bay is a blocked doorway, the entrance is in the east gable end, and the windows are sashes with flush wood architraves and stone sills.	II
Glebe Cottage; 54.09256°N 1.38109°W	—	Early 18th century (probable)	The cottage is in pinkish-brown brick on a cobble plinth, with rendered gable ends, a stepped floor band, dentilled eaves, and a swept pantile roof with raised brick verges. There are two storeys and four bays. On the front are two doorways, and the windows are horizontally-sliding sashes, the openings in the ground floor under segmental brick arches.	II
Hethertons Solicitors; 54.09447°N 1.39505°W	—	Early 18th century	A cottage, later an office, in painted brick, with dentilled eaves, and a steep half-hipped pantile roof. There are two storeys and three bays. The doorway is flanked by bow windows, and the upper floor contains casement windows. In the left return is a simple shopfront, with a sash window in an architrave above.	II
Hairdressers and flats 54.09402°N 1.39458°W		Early 18th century	A house divided into flats and a hairdresser's salon, in reddish-brown brick, with a plinth on the east, stepped eaves and a steep pantile roof. There are two storeys and three bays. In the centre is a doorway with reeded engaged columns, a radial fanlight, and an open pediment. To the right is a 20th-century shopfront, and to the left are two sash windows in architraves with segmental heads. The upper floor contains modern casement windows.	II
Penrose House; 54.09094°N 1.38140°W	—	Early 18th century (probable)	An inn, later a private house, in red brick with pilasters, a cogged and stepped floor band and eaves, and a tile roof. There are two storeys and four bays. On the front is a doorway with a pointed arch, and two canted bay windows with hipped roofs. The other windows are sashes, those on the front are horizontally-sliding, and at the rear they have segmental-arched heads.	II
The Cottage, Boroughbridge; 54.09560°N 1.39474°W		Early 18th century	The cottage is in brick, rendered at the front, with a sill band, stepped and dentilled eaves, tumbled-in brickwork in the gable, and a pantile roof. There are two storeys and two bays. The doorway is in the centre, it is flanked by canted bay windows, and in the upper floor are sash windows.	II
The Farmhouse; 54.09511°N 1.39473°W	—	Early 18th century	A cottage and farmhouse, later converted into two shops, it is in pinkish-brown brick, rendered on the front, with stepped and dentilled eaves, tumbled-in brickwork in the gable, and a swept pantile roof with raised brick verges. There are two storeys and three bays. On the front are three canted bay windows with bracketed cornices. Between them are two doorways with fanlights, and in the upper floor are sash windows in architraves.	II
Former Yorkshire Rose Public House; 54.09405°N 1.39427°W		Early 18th century	The public house, later used for other purposes, is in rendered brick, with a floor band, stepped and dentilled eaves, and a pantile roof with raised verges. The main block has two storeys and three bays, and it contains sash windows. There are later extensions to the south and east, with casement windows.	II
2, 4, 6 and 8 Fishergate; 54.09554°N 1.39487°W		18th century	A row of four shops on a corner site, the corner shop later used for other purposes. They are in rendered brick, with dentilled eaves, a pantile roof, and two storeys. The corner building has two bays on Fishergate and three on Market Square. On the Market Square front is a two-storey bay window. The other windows are sashes, some horizontally-sliding. Each of the shops has a single bay, and it contains a 19th-century shopfront with pilasters and a cornice.	II
Country Sport; 54.09437°N 1.39563°W	—	18th century	A house, later a shop, in pinkish-brown brick with a pantile roof. There are two storeys and two bays. In the centre is a doorway with reeded pilasters and an open pediment, flanked by canted bay windows with modillion cornices and sash windows. The upper floor contains sash windows in flush wood architraves with channelled stucco heads and sills.	II
Crown Hotel; 54.09619°N 1.39601°W		18th century	A former coaching inn on the site of an earlier house, incorporating fabric from the house. It is stuccoed, and has a slate roof and two storeys. The Bridge Street front has a modillion eaves cornice and six bays. In the centre is a doorway with consoles, a cornice and a pediment, and is flanked by iron boot scrapers. On the front are three canted bay windows, one with two storeys, and the other windows are sashes in architraves. Along Fishergate are 15 bays, six bay windows, and a central gabled section with French doors.	II
Library House and Cottage; 54.09456°N 1.39505°W		18th century	A house and shop in pinkish-brown brick with a pantile roof. There are two storeys and three bays. In the centre is a shopfront, flanked by doorways in architraves. The windows are sashes with architraves and gauged flat brick arches.	II
Former cottages, St James's Square; 54.09407°N 1.39503°W		18th century	A row of five cottages later converted for other uses. They are in rendered brick, with dentilled eaves and a pantile roof. There are two storeys and a total of nine bays. The upper floor contains sash windows, and in the ground floor most openings have been altered except for a square bay window with a modillion cornice, and a door with an oblong fanlight.	II
Sutton Farmhouse; 54.09251°N 1.38079°W	—	18th century	The farmhouse is in pinkish-brown brick, on a plinth, with stepped eaves, and a swept pantile roof with raised brick verges. There are two storeys, three irregular bays and a continuous rear outshut. The windows are sashes in architraves, those in the ground floor with gauged flat brick arches.	II
The Old Court House; 54.09084°N 1.38058°W		18th century	The former court house is in reddish-brown brick, with stepped dentilled eaves and a pantile roof with raised brick verges. There is a single storey, and the gable end faces the square. On the gable end is an external brick staircase leading to a blocked doorway, and set into it is a stone shelf used as a mounting block, and an inscribed plaque.	II
Chest tomb 54.09215°N 1.38099°W	—	Late 18th century	The chest tomb is in the churchyard of St Andrew's Church, Aldborough, to the south of the church tower. It is in sandstone, and commemorates Mark Smithson, a benefactor of the church. The tomb has fluted pilasters at the angles and in the centre of the exposed side, a cornice, and two oval sunk panels with inscriptions.	II
House and cottage, Bridge Street; 54.09651°N 1.39567°W		Late 18th century	The house and adjoining cottage to the right are in whitewashed brick, with dentilled eaves, the house with a floor band, and a tile roof with stone coping and kneelers, the cottage with a pantile roof. The house has three storeys and two bays. In the centre is a doorway flanked by canted bay windows, and the upper floors contain sash windows in architraves, splayed stuccoed channelled lintels. The cottage also has sash windows, and all the openings in it have segmental heads.	II
Auctioneers, St James's Square; 54.09445°N 1.39474°W		Late 18th century	A house and office in brown brick, with a floor band, dentilled eaves, and a pantile roof with stone coping. There are two storeys and three bays. The central doorway has an oblong fanlight, the windows are sashes, and all the openings have stuccoed wedge lintels and keystones. The forecourt is enclosed by railings.	II
White House; 54.09186°N 1.38132°W		Late 18th century	A cottage in painted brick on a plinth, with dentilled eaves, and a pantile roof with raised verges. There are two storeys and two bays, and a single-storey wing to the left. On the front is a doorway and horizontally-sliding sash windows.	II
23 and 25 Fishergate; 54.09596°N 1.39609°W		Late 18th to early 19th century	A pair of shops in colourwashed brick, with stepped and dentilled eaves and Welsh slate roofs. There are two storeys, the left shop had two bays, and the right shop has five. Between the shops is a round-arched doorway with attached columns, friezes with paterae, a fanlight, and an open pediment, and in the right bay is a carriage entrance. The left shop has a 20th-century shopfront, and the right shopfront dates from the 19th or early 20th century, and has pilasters, a cornice and brackets. In the upper floor are sash windows with splayed lintels.	II
33 New Row; 54.09281°N 1.39588°W		Late 18th to early 19th century	A cottage in rendered brick, with a pantile roof, two storeys and two bays. In the centre is a round-arched doorway with a radial fanlight. This is flanked by bow windows, and in the upper floor are segmental-arched sash windows.	II
Aldborough Dairy; 54.09172°N 1.38149°W		Late 18th to early 19th century	A house, at one time a shop, in pinkish-brown brick, with stepped eaves, and a pantile roof with stone coping and kneelers. There are two storeys and three bays. Steps lead up to the central doorway with a three-light fanlight. The windows are sashes, and all the openings have stuccoed wedge lintels.	II
Building linking Aldborough Manor and Manor Cottage; 54.09275°N 1.38278°W	—	Late 18th to early 19th century	The linking building is in painted brick and has a pantile roof. There is a single storey and five irregular bays. The left three bays contain round-arched sash windows, to the right is a doorway approached by steps, and a flat-headed sash window, and in the roof is a modern dormer.	II
Darry Cottage and Church View; 54.09182°N 1.38119°W		Late 18th to early 19th century	A pair of cottages in brick, partly rendered, with a pantile roof. There are two storeys, and each cottage has one bay. On the front are two doorways, and sash windows in flush wooden architraves.	II
Kenmuir; 54.09360°N 1.39602°W		Late 18th to early 19th century	The house is in pinkish-brown brick with dentilled eaves and a pantile roof with raised verges. There are two storeys and three bays. The central round-headed doorway has a rendered surround and a radial fanlight. The windows are sashes in architraves, with splayed lintels.	II
Cottage adjoining Kenmuir; 54.09351°N 1.39603°W		18th or early 19th century	The cottage is in pinkish brick with dentilled eaves and a tile roof. There are two storeys and two bays. In the centre is a doorway with an oblong fanlight, the windows are sashes, and all the openings have segmental heads.	II
Manor Cottage and Flats; 54.09263°N 1.38262°W		Late 18th or early 19th century	Originally a pair of cottages in pale brown brick, with stepped and dentilled eaves, the left cottage with a floor band, and over all is a pantile roof. There are two storeys, each cottage has three bays, and between them is a bay containing a carriage arch over which is a small window. The left cottage has a doorway with an oblong fanlight, the doorway in the right cottage has a doorway under a segmental arch, and above it is a blocked window. The other windows are sashes in architraves, with flat gauged brick arches.	II
Minskip Lodge; 54.07836°N 1.40652°W	—	Late 18th to early 19th century	The house is in brown brick, and has a roof in Welsh slate roof with stone coping and shaped kneelers. There are two storeys, and three bays. Steps lead to the central doorway that has reeded pilasters, paterae in the friezes, a patterned radial fanlight, and an open pediment. This is flanked by canted bay windows, and the upper floor contains sash windows with segmental-arched stuccoed lintels.	II
Mynthurst; 54.09656°N 1.39617°W		Late 18th to early 19th century	A house in brown brick, with a modillion eaves cornice, and a Welsh slate roof with stone coping. There are two storeys and three bays. Steps flanked by iron railings lead to a doorway with attached columns, paterae in the friezes, a radial fanlight, and on open modillion pediment. This is flanked by bow windows, most of the other windows are sashes in architraves, on the north side is a segmental-headed entrance, and at the rear is a round-arched staircase window. The forecourt is enclosed by iron railings.	II
The Cottage, Aldborough; 54.08986°N 1.38030°W	—	18th to early 19th century	The cottage is in whitewashed brick and has a swept pantile roof. There are two storeys and three bays. On the front is a trellis porch and another doorway to the left. The windows are sashes in architraves, those in the ground floor with segmental-arched heads.	II
Aldborough Lodge; 54.09341°N 1.38413°W	—	Early 19th century	The house is in pale brown brick, and has a Welsh slate roof with stone coping and kneelers. There are two storeys and four bays. In the centre is a prostyle Roman Doric porch and a doorway with a patterned fanlight in an architrave. The windows are sashes with channelled stuccoed wedge lintels and stone sills.	II
Walls, railing and gate, Aldborough Lodge; 54.09348°N 1.38450°W	—	Early 19th century	The wall along the front of the house is in pale brown brick, dwarf in places, and swept up at the ends and near the centre to a height of about 1.5 metres (4 ft 11 in). On the lower parts are wrought iron railings with bud finials, and the gate is similar.	II
Hob Hall and barn 54.06872°N 1.39061°W	—	Early 19th century	A cottage with an attached barn in reddish-brown brick with a pantile roof. There are two storeys and two bays. The entrance is in the gable end, the windows are casements, and the openings have segmental heads. To the north is a barn containing opposed wagon doors and slit vents.	II
Homeleigh and shop 54.09591°N 1.39671°W		Early 19th century	The house and attached shop are in brown brick, with a wooden eaves cornice and a Welsh slate roof. There are two storeys and three bays. In the centre is a doorway with reeded pilasters, paterae in the friezes, a fanlight, and an open pediment. To the right is a bow window, and to the left is a square modillioned shopfront with a doorway on its left. The upper floor contains sash windows.	II
Laurel House; 54.09344°N 1.38389°W	—	Early 19th century	The house is in pale brown brick on a stone plinth and has a pantile roof. There are two storeys and three bays. The central doorway has an architrave, a small modillion cornice, and a pediment on shaped brackets. The windows are sashes with architraves, and stuccoed channelled lintels with keystones.	II
Manor Farmhouse, wall and railings 54.09283°N 1.38239°W	—	Early 19th century	The house is in brick, rendered on the front, and has a Welsh slate roof. There are two storeys and three bays. In the centre is a doorway with an oblong fanlight in an architrave, and the windows are sashes in architraves. In front of the house is a dwarf wall with plain iron railings.	II
Wall and railings, Minskip Lodge; 54.07827°N 1.40605°W	—	Early 19th century	The garden wall is in brick with stone coping. The side wall is low, and at the front is a dwarf wall with wrought iron railings ad a double gate. At the angles are rusticated stone piers with ogee caps.	II
Post office and former hotel 54.09640°N 1.39647°W		Early 19th century	The building, which possibly includes earlier material, is in stuccoed brick, with a wooden eaves cornice, dentilled eaves, and a hipped Welsh slate roof. There are three storeys and seven bays, the middle three bays projecting under a pediment with a round window. In the right two bays is a shopfront, and the windows are sashes with splayed lintels. In the left return is a doorway with a decorated radial fanlight, and a canted bay window.	II
Prospect House and railings 54.09009°N 1.38202°W	—	Early 19th century	The house is in brown brick, and has a Welsh slate roof with stone verges. There are two storeys and two bays. The central doorway has an oblong fanlight, and the windows are sashes, those in the ground floor with stuccoed splayed lintels. The forecourt is enclosed by railings.	II
Barn and stable, Studforth Farm; 54.08974°N 1.38049°W	—	Early 19th century	The former threshing barn and attached stable with a hayloft above are in reddish-brown brick on a cobble plinth, with dentilled eaves and pantile roofs. The gable end of the barn faces the street, and contains a pitching door and vents in various patterns. Elsewhere, there are wagon doors, stable doors and slatted windows.	II
The Firs; 54.09339°N 1.38370°W	—	Early 19th century	The house is in pale brown brick and has a pantile roof. There are two storeys and two bays. The central doorway has an oblong fanlight, it is flanked by bow windows, and in the upper floor are sash windows with channelled stucco heads and plain sills.	II
Former Tuck Shop; 54.09402°N 1.39492°W		Early 19th century	A cottage, later a shop, in rendered brick with a pantile roof. There are two storeys and two bays. The doorway is in the centre, to the left is a shop window, the glazing bars formed by pilasters, and the other windows are sashes in flush wood architraves.	II
Ornhams Hall; 54.07021°N 1.38816°W		1835	A large house designed by J. B. Papworth, it is rendered, on a plinth, and has a floor band, a cornice, and a double-span roof in Lakeland slate. There are two storeys and three bays. In the centre is a projecting porch with consoles, and a doorway with a fanlight. The windows are sashes, in the ground floor they are tripartite, in segmental arched recesses and divided by pilasters, and in the upper floor they are in architraves. On the north front is a two-storey canted bay window, and to the right is a lower wing with a hipped roof in Welsh slate.	II
Wall, railings and gate piers, Boroughbridge Hall; 54.09566°N 1.39441°W		Early to mid 19th century	The wall at the entrance to the grounds is in yellow sandstone, it has a heavy plinth, and the end piers are in pink sandstone. The gate piers are in yellow and pink sandstone, each has a cornice, and a narrower upper section with a bracketed cornice and a pyramidal cap. The railings and gates are in wrought iron.	II
Chatsworth House; 54.09514°N 1.39771°W		Early to mid 19th century	The house is in pinkish-brown brick with sandstone dressings, a floor band and an overhanging hipped Welsh slate roof. There are two storeys and a basement, and five bays. Five steps lead up to a central porch with baseless engaged Tuscan columns, distyle in antis. Above it is a window in a stone recess flanked by pairs of pilasters with pilaster jambs. The windows are sashes, and at the rear are two bow windows with bracketed cornices.	II
Havenhands Bakers and adjacent house 54.09405°N 1.39546°W	—	Early to mid 19th century	A pair of houses, the right one with a shopfront. They are in pinkish-brown brick with dentilled eaves, a pantile roof hipped on the right, and three storeys. The left house has two bays, a central doorway with an oblong fanlight, and sash windows in architraves, the openings in the lower two floors with painted wedge lintels. The right house has three bays, a shopfront in the ground floor, sash windows with gauged brick arches in the middle floor, and casement windows in the top floor.	II
Hazeldene and railings 54.09160°N 1.38082°W		Early to mid 19th century	The house is in pale brown brick with a hipped Welsh slate roof. There are two storeys and three bays. Steps lead up to the central doorway that has a patterned oblong fanlight, a stone architrave and a cornice. The windows are sashes with patterned stuccoed heads and keystones. Along the front of the garden are railings.	II
Ladywell House; 54.09395°N 1.39307°W		Early to mid 19th century	A house in pinkish-brown brick with stuccoed coved eaves and an overhanging hipped Welsh slate roof. There are two storeys and three bays. Steps lead up to the central doorway that has a stuccoed surround with pilasters and an entablature, and a decorated oblong fanlight. The windows are sashes with stuccoed channelled wedge lintels. To the west and at right angles is a lower wing.	II
Former premises of Knight, Frank and Rutley, and Carousel; 54.09455°N 1.39546°W		Early to mid 19th century	A shop and a house in pinkish-brown brick, with a modillion eaves cornice and a Welsh slate roof. There are three storeys and four bays. In the third bay is a doorway with attached Tuscan columns, a decorated fanlight and an entablature, and to the right is a canted bay window with a modillion cornice. The area at the front is enclosed by iron railings. In the left two bays is an early 20th-century shopfront. The upper floors contain sash windows with channelled stuccoed lintels.	II
Riverside Court; 54.09701°N 1.39518°W		Early to mid 19th century	A public house, later converted for residential use, in brick, partly colourwashed, partly rendered, with a wooden eaves cornice, and a Welsh slate roof with a kneeler on the right. There are three storeys and three bays. In the right bay is a round-arched doorway with a fanlight, and the windows are sashes with splayed channelled stucco heads and plain sills.	II
Rose Cottage; 54.09126°N 1.37982°W	—	Early to mid 19th century	The cottage is in pale brown brick, and has a pantile roof with raised verges. There are two storeys and three bays. The central doorway has an oblong fanlight, and the windows are sashes with splayed rendered lintels.	II
47 and 49 High Street; 54.09538°N 1.39508°W		19th century (probable)	A house, later a shop and an office, in rendered brick, with stepped and dentilled eaves and a swept pantile roof. There are two storeys and four bays. In the second bay is a doorway with reeded pilasters, friezes with paterae, a radial fanlight and an open pediment, flanked by modillion bow windows. In the right two bays is a 20th-century shopfront, and the upper floor contains sash windows in architraves.	II
Castle House; 54.09094°N 1.37996°W		Mid 19th century	The house is in pinkish-brown brick, with stone dressings, stepped and dentilled eaves, and a tile roof with raised stone verges and kneelers, and is in Tudor Revival style. There are two storeys and five bays. In the centre is a later porch with quoins, a band and battlements, and the entrance on the side. The windows are chamfered and mullioned, with two lights and hood moulds, and have lattice glazing.	II
Hall Farmhouse; 54.09076°N 1.37999°W		Mid 19th century	The house is in reddish-brown brick with stone dressings, dentilled eaves, and a tile roof with raised stone verges and kneelers. There are two storeys and two bays, and it is in Tudor Revival style. The central doorway has alternating block jambs, a flattened Tudor arch, and a hood mould. The windows have two lights, chamfered mullions, lozenge glazing, and hood moulds.	II
Milepost; 54.06849°N 1.39076°W		Mid 19th century	The milepost is on the east side of the A168 road. It is in stone with iron cladding, and has a triangular plan and a rounded top. The top is inscribed "FERRYBRIDGE AND BOROUGHBRIDGE ROAD" and "BOROUGHBRIDGE", on the left side are the distances to Wetherby, Aberford, and Ferrybridge, and on the right side the distance to Boroughbridge.	II
St James' Church, Boroughbridge; 54.09309°N 1.39420°W		1852	The church, designed by Mallinson and Healey in Decorated style, is in sandstone with roofs of stone slate and tile. It consists of a nave with a clerestory, north and south aisles, a south porch, a chancel and a west tower. The tower has three stages, a north stair turret, stepped angle buttresses rising to embattled corner turrets, string courses, a west window with a pointed arch and hood mould, lancet windows and clock faces in the middle stage, two-light bell openings with hood moulds, and an embattled parapet. Re-set into the internal walls are late Norman architectural fragments.	II
Market Well; 54.09433°N 1.39494°W		1875	Covering the well is a stone pedestal and urn, and this is surrounded by an open octagonal structure approached by steps. There are eight Doric columns on pedestals carrying an entablature with metopes and triglyphs. Above are brick gables containing roundels, a tile roof, and a round-arched wooden cupola with a weathervane.	II
The Three Horse Shoes Public House; 54.09676°N 1.39594°W		c. 1930	The public house is in painted render with applied timber framing, and has a tile roof. There are two storeys and an attic, a front range of four bays, a recessed bay on the right, and a later rear extension. On the front are two doorways with triangular canopies, and four canted bay windows. The upper floor contains two-light casement windows, and in the roof are six flat-roofed dormers.	II
Telephone Kiosk by the Crown Hotel; 54.09592°N 1.39556°W		1935	The K6 type telephone kiosk in Fishergate was designed by Giles Gilbert Scott. Constructed in cast iron with a square plan and a dome, it has three unperforated crowns in the top panels.	II
Telephone Kiosk by the library 54.09427°N 1.39454°W		1935	The K6 type telephone kiosk in Market Square was designed by Giles Gilbert Scott. Constructed in cast iron with a square plan and a dome, it has three unperforated crowns in the top panels.	II
Stocks; 54.09095°N 1.38065°W		Undated	The stocks and bench on the village green are in wood. They have iron hinges, and contain eight holes.	II
