= Battle Cross, Boroughbridge =

Grace II monument in Aldborough, England

Coordinates: 54°05′33″N 1°22′55″W

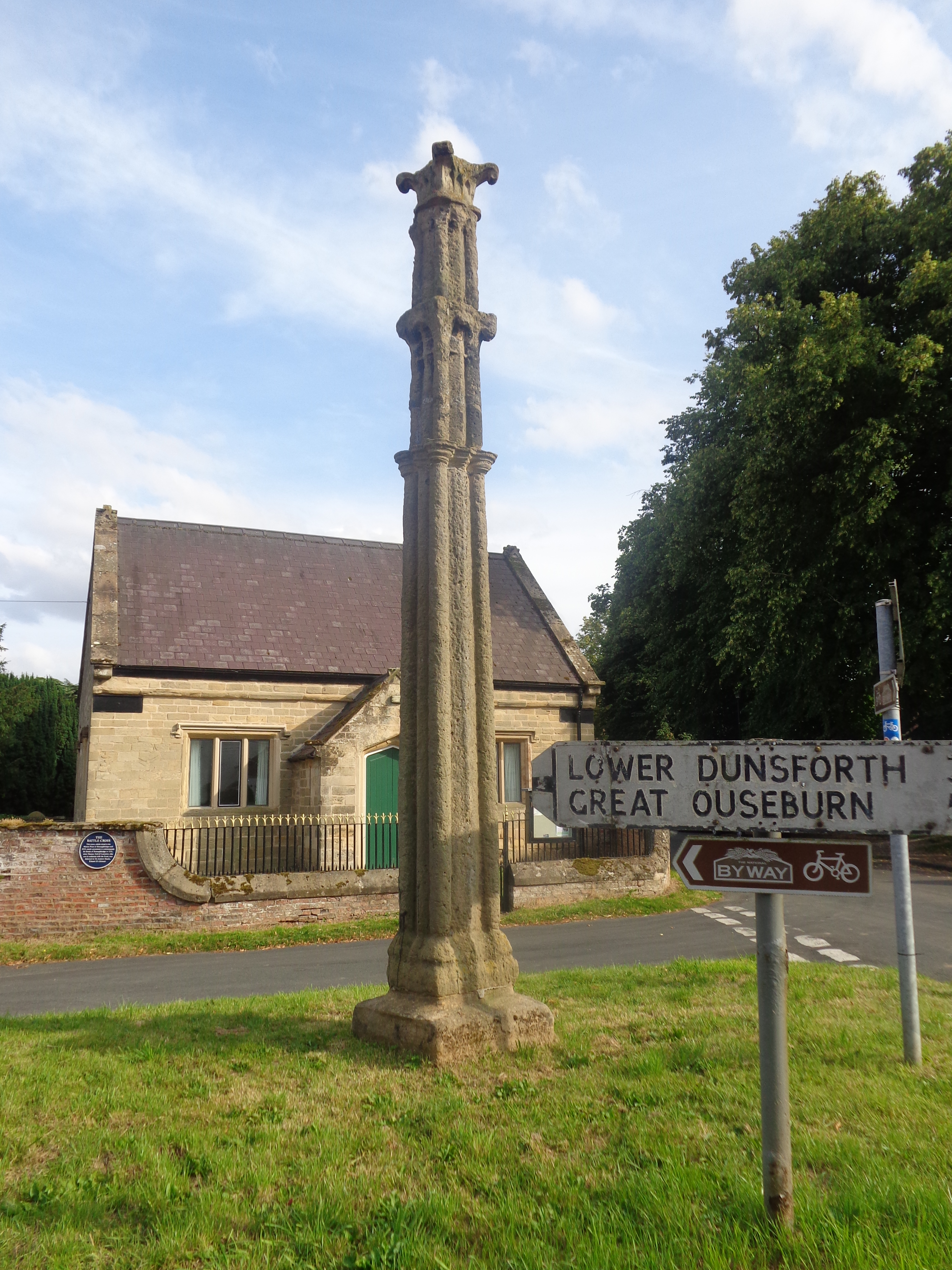
The cross, in 2014

The Battle Cross is a historic monument in Aldborough, North Yorkshire in England.

The 18-foot high cross was erected to commemorate the Battle of Boroughbridge, which took place in 1322. The cross itself is probably 15th century, and it originally stood in the market place of Boroughbridge. In 1852, it was moved to the nearby village of Aldborough, in front of St Andrew's Church. It was Grade II listed in 1966.

The cross consists of four diagonal shafts with spurs between, in three diminishing stages, with moulded capitals. The shafts of the middle stage have crocketed capitals, and the top stage has a crocketed capital. The top parts have been damaged, and Nikolaus Pevsner describes them as having been "reassembled with dubious accuracy".

In 2026, scientists at York University used isotopic fingerprinting to prove that the cross had been carved from one of the nearby Devil's Arrows.

== See also ==
- Listed buildings in Boroughbridge
