= St James' Church, Boroughbridge =

Grade II listed church in North Yorkshire, England

Coordinates: 54°05′35″N 1°23′39″W

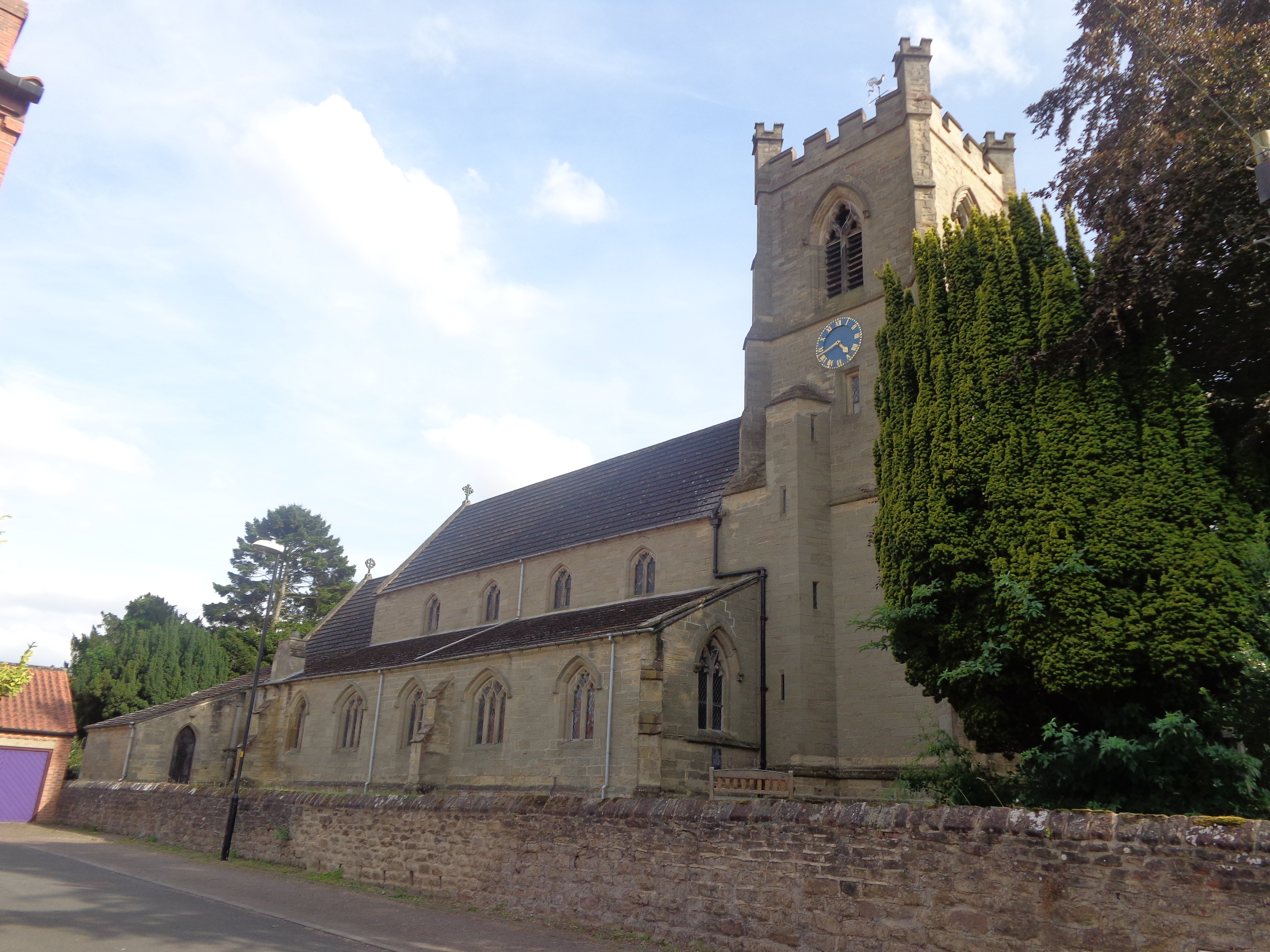
The church, in 2014

St James' Church is the parish church of Boroughbridge, a town in North Yorkshire, in England.

The original St James' Church was a medieval chapel-of-ease to St Andrew's Church, Aldborough, located in what is now St James's Square. The current church was built on Church Lane in 1852, to a design by James Mallinson and Thomas Healey. It is in the Decorated Gothic style, but is a simple, pared-back design. C. P. Canfield describes the building as "a moderately large church... the subscribers got a lot of accommodation for their money". The tower is said to be a copy of the tower of the Mediaeval church. The building was Grade II listed in 1984.

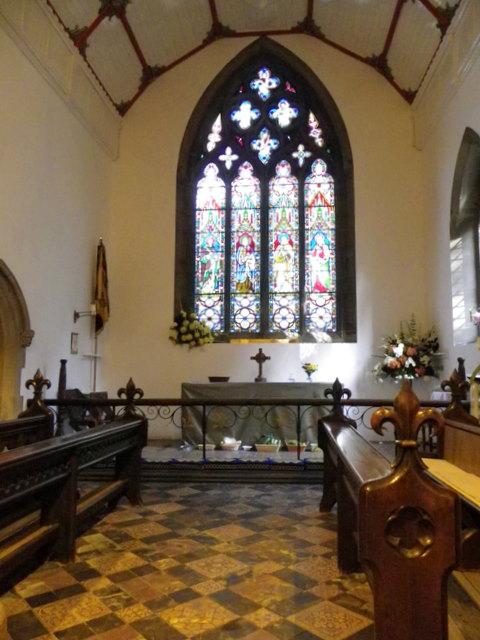
View into the chancel

The church is built of sandstone with roofs of stone slate and tile. It consists of a nave with a clerestory, north and south aisles, a south porch, a chancel and a west tower. The tower has three stages, a north stair turret, stepped angle buttresses rising to embattled corner turrets, string courses, a west window with a pointed arch and hood mould, lancet windows and clock faces in the middle stage, two-light bell openings with hood moulds, and an embattled parapet.

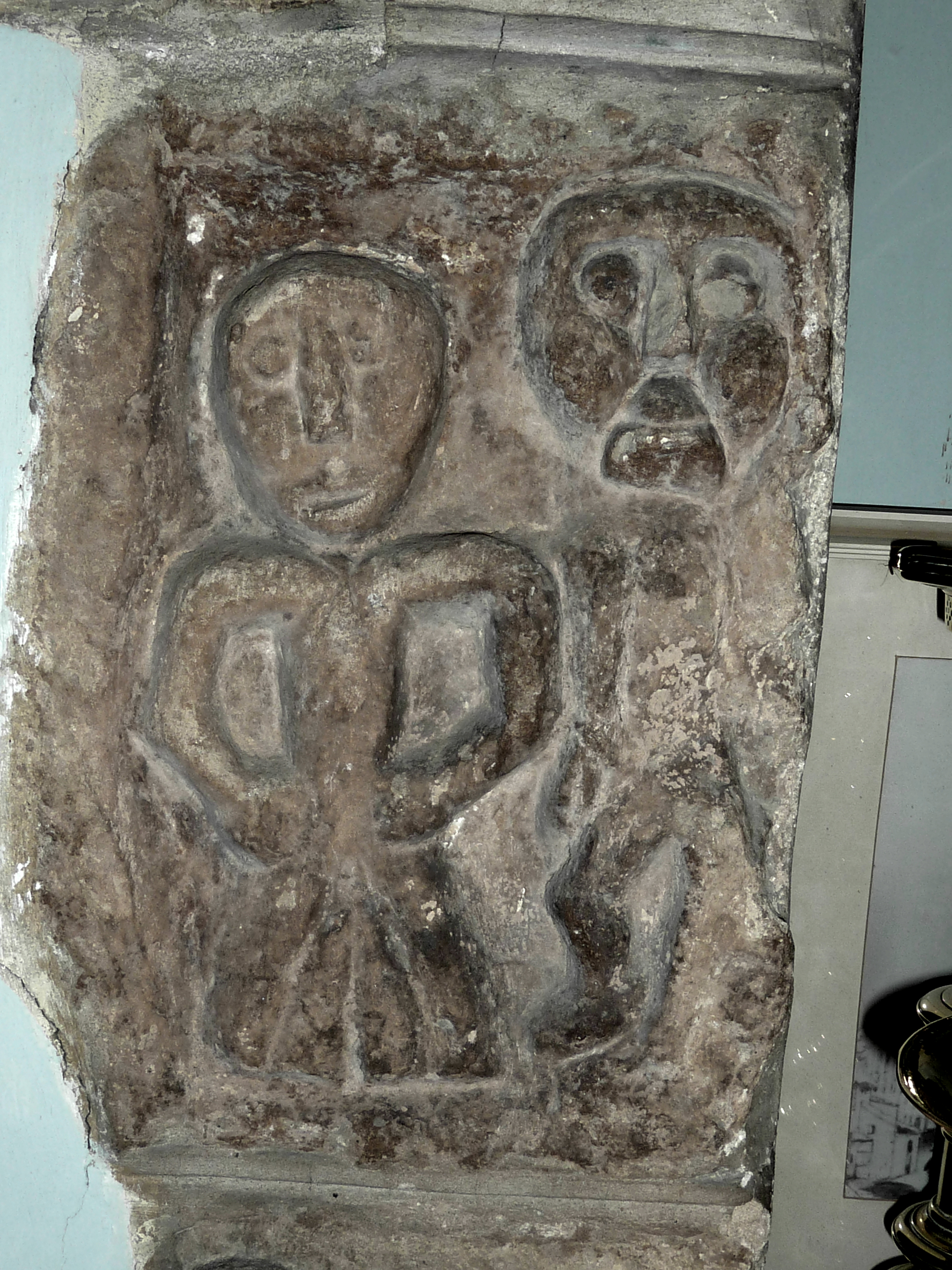
One of the Romanesque carvings

The east window has four lights, and stained glass by William Wailes. Re-set into the internal walls are late Norman architectural fragments. They form a random collection and, other than the possible arch of a priest's door, were set into the walls of the former church. These may have originally formed part of one or more earlier churches and have been used in reconstructing the chapel at Boroughbridge, perhaps after a raid by Scots in the early 13th century.

== See also ==
- Listed buildings in Boroughbridge
