= Borough Bridge =

Grade II bridge across the River Ure in Boroughbridge, England

Coordinates: 54.0974°N 1.3954°W

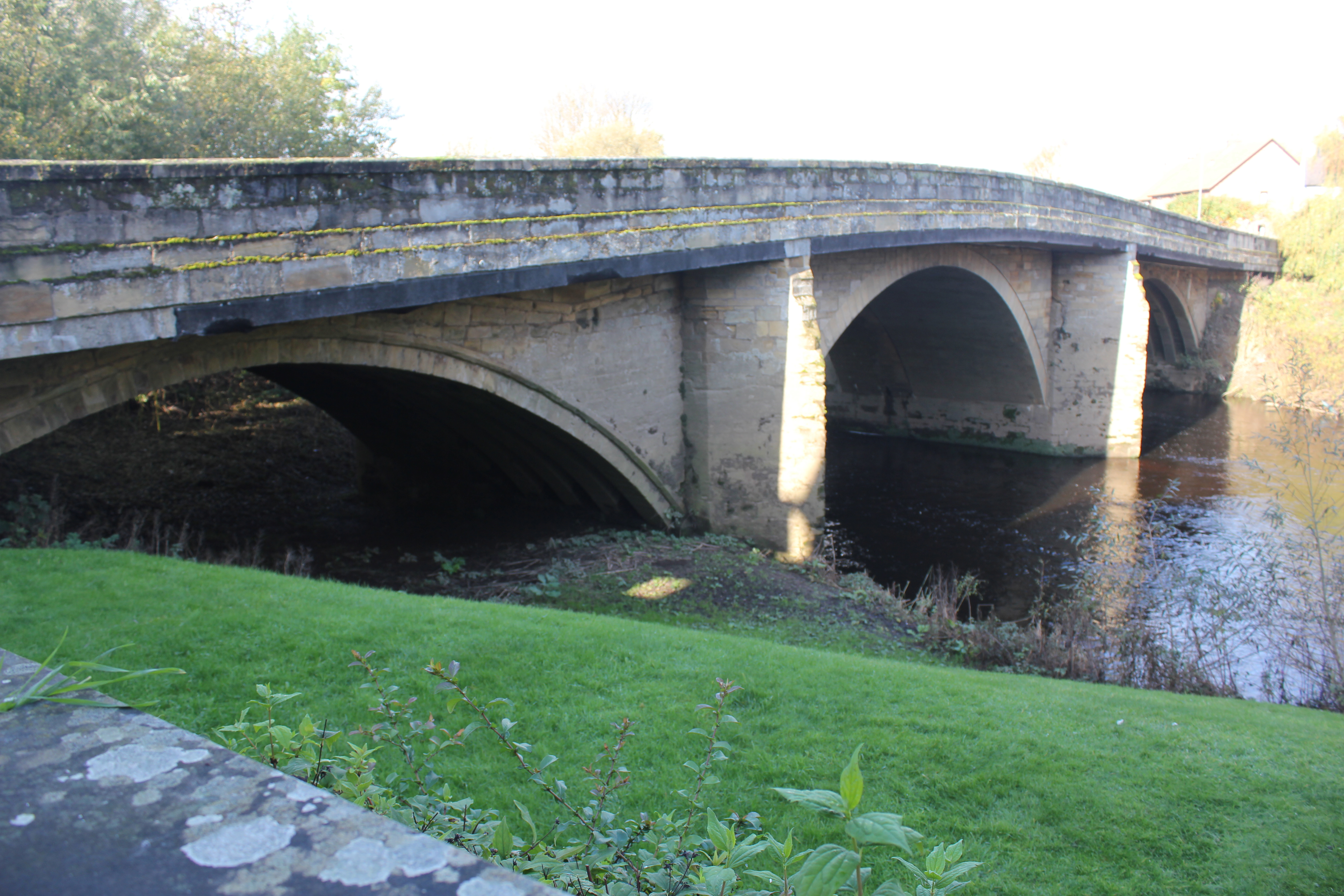
The bridge, in 2011

Borough Bridge is a historic bridge across the River Ure in Boroughbridge, a town in North Yorkshire, in England.

The bridge lies on what was the Great North Road, spanning the former boundary between the West and North Ridings of Yorkshire, and the parishes of Langthorpe and Boroughbridge. A timber bridge at the location was recorded in the 12th century, and again in 1322, at the time of the Battle of Boroughbridge. In 1562, the bridge was rebuilt in stone. It was widened between 1782 and 1785 by John Carr of York and John Gott, surveyors for the North and West Ridings, respectively. The southern section of the bridge collapsed in 1945 and had to be #reconstructed. The bridge was Grade II listed in 1966.

The bridge is built of sandstone, and has three segmental arches. There are two pointed cutwaters on the east side and semi-circular cutwaters on the west, carried up as buttresses. Under the arches are five wide ribs. The parapets continue beyond the bridge to the north, and have square terminals.

== See also ==
- Listed buildings in Boroughbridge
- Listed buildings in Langthorpe
- List of crossings of the River Ure

Bridges over the River Ure
| Upstream: Arrows Bridge | Downstream: Aldwark Bridge |
