= Aldborough Hall =

Historic building in Aldborough, North Yorkshire, England

- Interactive map of the Aldborough Hall area

General information
- Architectural style: Jacobean / Carolean
- Location: Low Road, Aldborough, Boroughbridge, North Yorkshire, England
- Coordinates: 54.0913°N 1.3804°W

Technical details
- Material: Red brick with stone dressings and Welsh slate roof

Designations

Listed Building – Grade II*
- Designated: 8 March 1952
- Reference no.: 1315502

Aldborough Hall is an early 17th-century country house and Grade II* listed building situated on Low Road in the village of Aldborough, near Boroughbridge, North Yorkshire, England.

Constructed predominantly of red brick with stone dressings, the hall is notable for its combination of 17th-century architectural fabric and fine imported interior fittings, including a large Jacobean staircase salvaged from Wales and historic panelling from Surrey.

== History ==
=== Site and origin ===
The hall sits within the perimeter of the ancient Roman town of Isurium Brigantum, which served as the civitas capital of the Brigantes tribe under Roman rule.

The manor of Aldborough was held for centuries by the Aldburghe (or Aldborough) family, whose members served as local landlords and parliamentary representatives, including Richard Aldborough, who represented the Aldborough constituency in the House of Commons during the 17th century. The present hall was erected in the early 17th century, likely replacing or incorporating parts of an earlier medieval structure on the site. In 1633, the property passed into the hands of the Gay family, a date inscribed on a rear staircase and gable end.

=== 19th and 20th-century developments ===
Following political shifts and land sales following the Reform Act 1832, the estate was acquired by Thomas Duncombe in 1834. During the Victorian era, a substantial north wing was added to expand accommodation.

During the mid-20th century, this Victorian extension was demolished to restore the building's more compact historical proportions, necessitating the construction of a new entrance on the north facade. On 8 March 1952, Aldborough Hall was officially designated a Grade II* listed building in recognition of its special architectural and historical significance.

In 1999, the hall was placed on the market as a private residence set within extensive grounds containing an 18th-century walled garden, an island pond, and a tennis court.

== Architecture ==
=== Exterior ===
Aldborough Hall is built of red brick laid in bond with ashlar stone dressings, ashlar quoins, and mullioned and transomed windows under a Welsh slate roof.

The building rises across two and three storeys, characterized by prominent twin gables on its main facades. The west elevation features a full-height, three-storey canted bay window topped with a battlemented stone parapet and fitted with heavy mullioned and transomed stone-framed windows. Re-configured in the 20th century following the removal of the Victorian wing, creating a simplified entrance layout.

=== Interior fittings ===
The interior contains a notable collection of historic fittings and architectural salvage integrated during various phased renovations. A grand 17th-century oak staircase imported from Lymore in Montgomeryshire, Wales. It features term-shaped fielded-panelled balusters and oversized newel posts topped with stepped pyramidal and inverted heart-shaped finials. An elaborate 17th-century wood panelling imported from Ashley Park in Surrey, alongside fitted period doors and timber cornices. A late medieval four-centred stone arched fireplace located in a former schoolroom, and an 18th-century Adam-style carved fireplace in the principal dining room. And a stone-flagged entrance hall with a moulded plaster ceiling.

== See also ==
- Grade II* listed buildings in North Yorkshire (district)
- Listed buildings in Boroughbridge
