= Devil's Arrows =

Standing stones in North Yorkshire, England

The Devil's Arrows
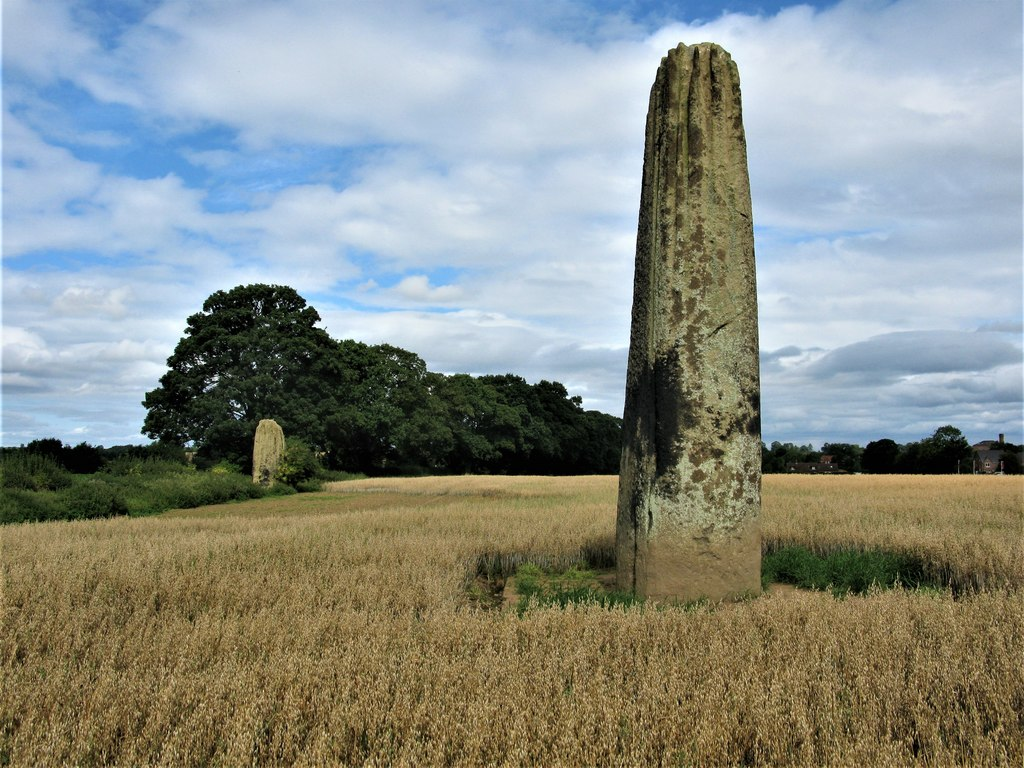
- The central and northern stones in 2018
- Interactive map of The Devil's Arrows
- 54°5′34.53″N 1°24′13.25″W
- Type: Standing stones
- Periods: Late Neolithic or early Bronze Age
- Location: Near Boroughbridge and Harrogate
- Region: North Yorkshire, England

Site notes
- Material: Gritstone
- Condition: Largely intact

The Devil's Arrows are three aligned standing stones located outside Boroughbridge in North Yorkshire, England, near to where the A168 road (previously the A1) crosses the River Ure. The southernmost of the three remaining stones is the second tallest in the UK.

== Site ==
The standing stone alignment known as the Devil's Arrows consists of some of the tallest standing stones in the United Kingdom. The monument is unusual in that it is located in a lowland setting.

The construction pits for the erection of the stones remain buried beneath the ground.

The outer stones are 360 and 200 feet (110 and 60 m) away from the central stone and form an almost straight line, running NNW–SSE.

The stones have been designated as a scheduled monument since 1923.

Erected during the Stone Age and distinctively grooved by millennia of rainfall, the tallest stone is 22.5 feet (6.85 m) in height, making this the second tallest menhir in the United Kingdom after the 25 feet (7.6 m) tall Rudston Monolith in the East Riding of Yorkshire. The other two stones are 22 feet (6.7 m) and 18 feet (5.5 m) tall. It is thought that the alignment originally included at least five stones. The English antiquarian William Camden mentioned four stones in his Britannia, noting that "one was lately pulled down by some that hoped, though in vain, to find treasure". One of the stones, displaced during an unsuccessful search for treasure during the 18th century, was used as the base for a nearby bridge over a river.

== Source ==
The stones are composed of Millstone Grit and the most likely source was previously thought to be Plumpton Rocks, about eight miles (13 km) to the south, near Knaresborough.

In 2026, scientists at Curtin University and the University of York used isotopic fingerprinting to show that the stones originated at Brimham Rocks, about 11 miles (18 km) to the west. The study also found that the Battle Cross at Aldborough has the same geological fingerprint as the surviving Arrows, supporting its identification as a repurposed fourth stone from the original monument.

== Setting ==
The stones are part of a prehistoric complex concentrated around the River Ure. They form part of a ritual landscape which includes henge monuments and tumuli extending to the north of the site. They are part of a wider Neolithic complex on the Ure-Swale plateau which incorporates the Thornborough Henges.

It is thought that they may have been arranged to align with the southernmost summer moonrise.

== Name ==
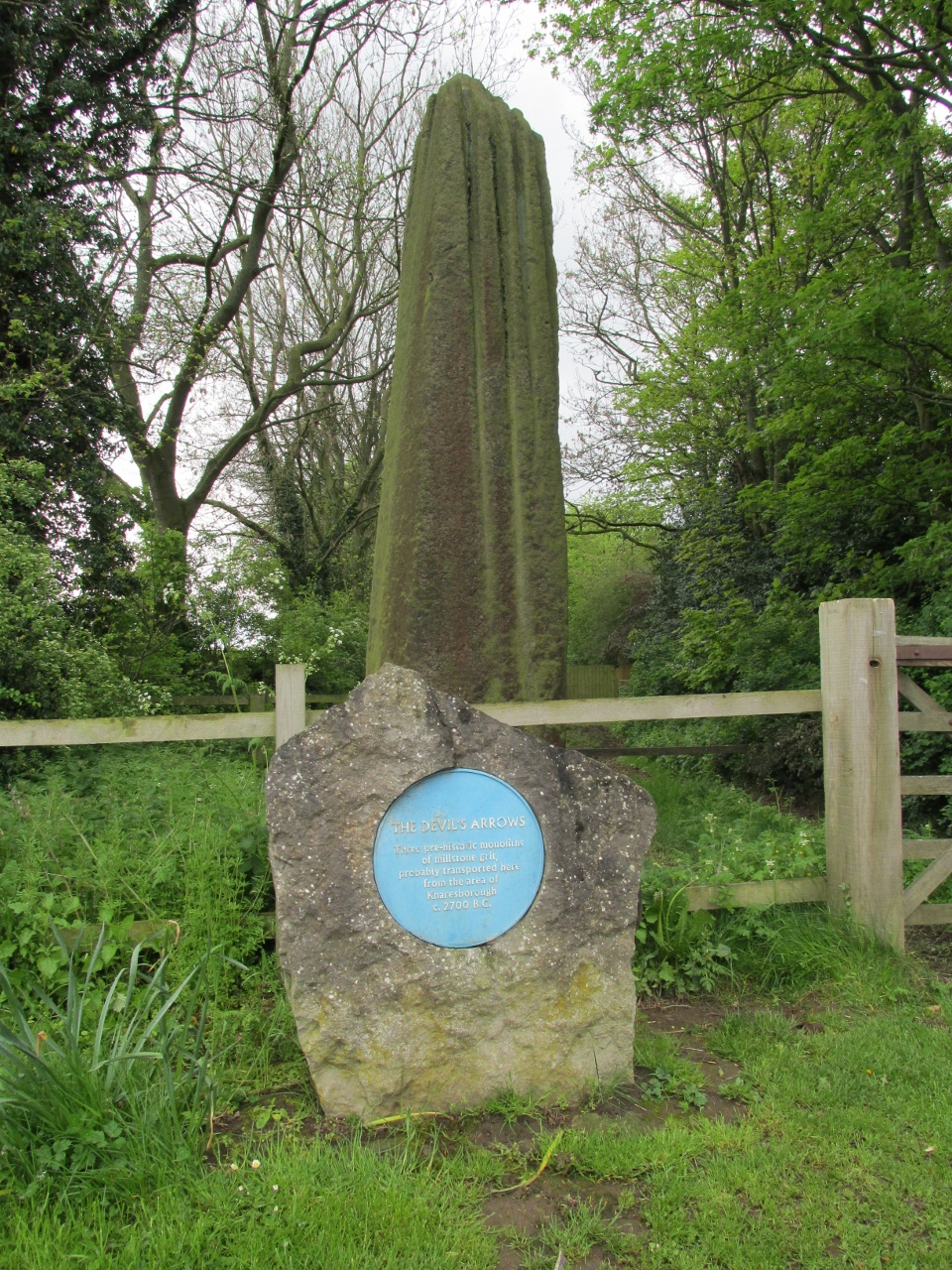
The southern stone

The name is mentioned by the antiquary John Aubrey, who visited and drew the stones in 1687. There is a legend, which goes back to 1721, that says the Devil threw the stones, aiming at the next town of Aldborough. He stood on Howe Hill and shouted, "Borobrigg keep out o' way, for Aldborough town I will ding down!". However, the stones fell short and landed near Boroughbridge instead.

== See also ==
- List of menhirs
