= Aldborough, North Yorkshire =

Village and civil parish in North Yorkshire, England

Coordinates: 54°05′28″N 1°22′50″W

Aldborough
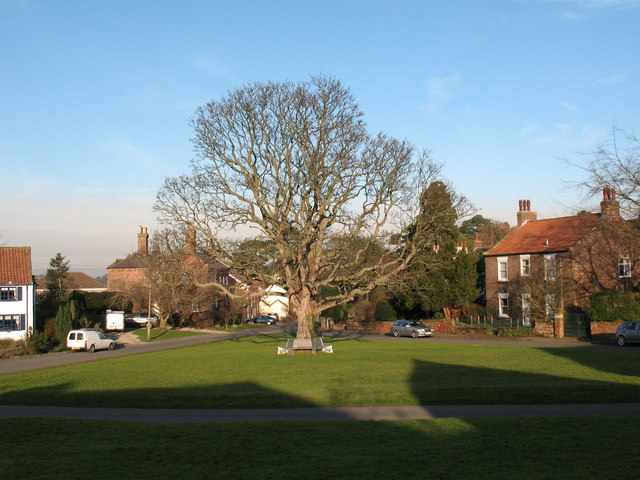
- Aldborough village green

- Location within North Yorkshire
- OS grid reference: SE405662
- Civil parish: Boroughbridge
- Unitary authority: North Yorkshire
- Ceremonial county: North Yorkshire
- Region: Yorkshire and the Humber
- Country: England
- Sovereign state: United Kingdom
- Post town: YORK
- Postcode district: YO51
- Dialling code: 01423
- Police: North Yorkshire
- Fire: North Yorkshire
- Ambulance: Yorkshire
- UK Parliament: Harrogate and Knaresborough

Aldborough is a village in the civil parish of Boroughbridge, 7 miles (11 km) to the north-east of Knaresborough, in North Yorkshire, England.

Historically a part of the West Riding of Yorkshire, Aldborough was built on the site of a major Romano-British town, Isurium Brigantum. The Brigantes, the most populous Celtic tribe in the area at the time of the Roman occupation of Britain, used the settlement as a capital. Isurium may also have been the base of the Roman Legio VIIII Hispana.

== Archaeology ==
Aldborough was built on the site of a major Roman town, Isurium Brigantum, which marked the crossing of the River Ure by Dere Street, the Roman Road from York north to the Antonine Wall via Corbridge and Hadrian's Wall. Isurium Brigantum, after AD160, was the administrative centre of the Brigantes (and around about the centre of two ridings and York's land that the Brigantes originally covered), the most populous British tribe in the area at the time of the Roman occupation. Traces of comfortable houses have been found, with many potsherds, coins and bronze, iron and other objects, and a large part of the town walls can be seen. The Aldborough Roman Site museum, run by English Heritage, contains relics of the Roman town, including mosaic pavements.

Currently an extensive project is in progress directed by Rose Ferraby and Martin Millett, which has undertaken extensive geophysical surveys, not only of the town and also the suburbs. These have revealed the regular layout of the town, showing the presence of a military compound and confirming the position of the forum and amphitheatre.

== History ==
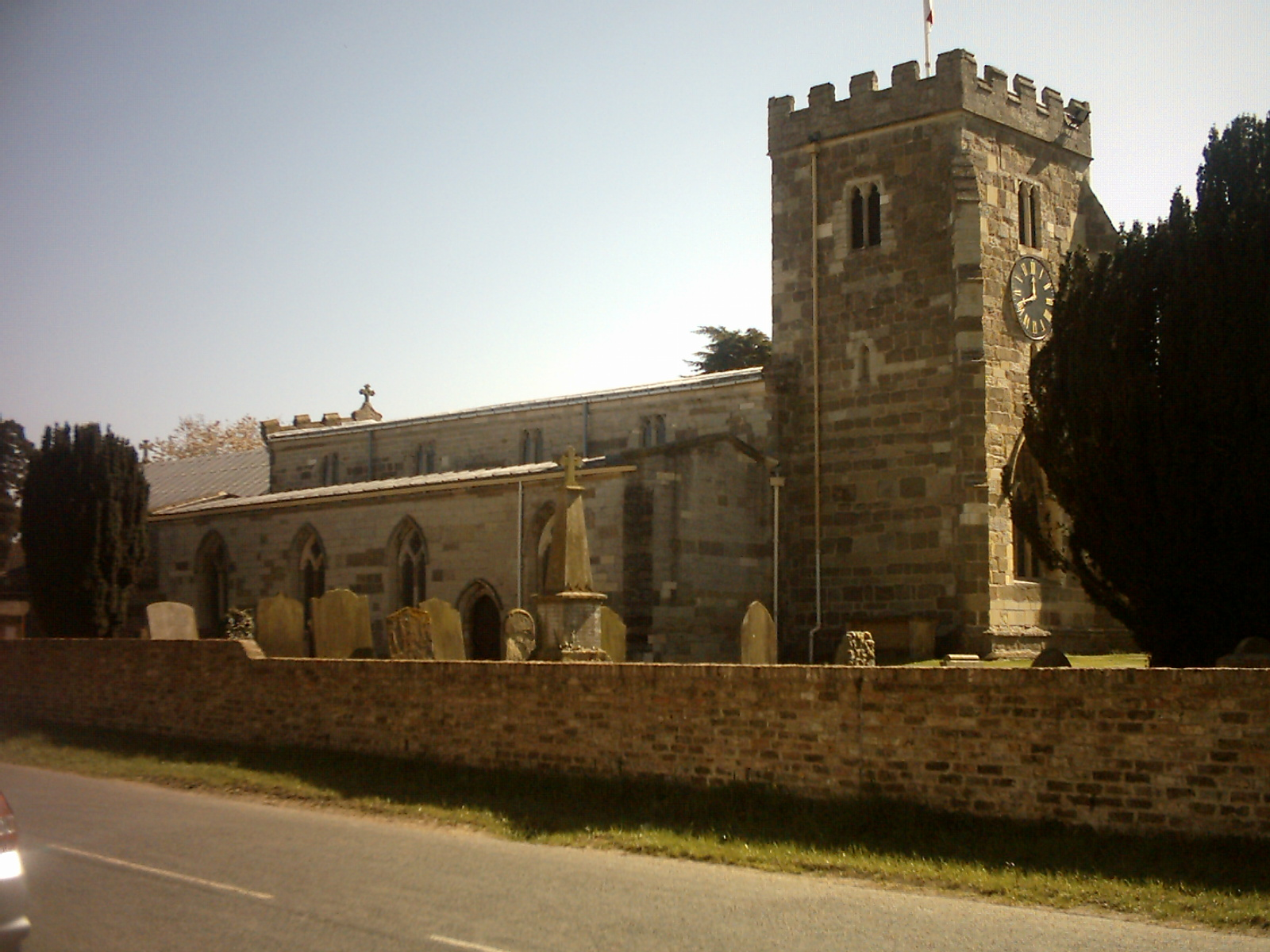
St Andrew's Church, Aldborough

Aldborough was mentioned in the Domesday Book of 1086 as Burgh (Old English burh 'ancient fortification'). By 1145 the prefix ald (old) had been added.

Aldborough lost much of its importance when the river crossing was moved to Boroughbridge in Norman times. In the Middle Ages it was made a parliamentary borough, and returned two Members of Parliament (MPs) until the seat was abolished in the Reform Act 1832.

Aldborough was a large ancient parish, which included townships in both the West Riding of Yorkshire and across the River Ure in the North Riding. In the West Riding the parish included Aldborough, Boroughbridge, Lower Dunsforth, Minskip, Roecliffe and Upper Dunsforth. In the North Riding the parish included Ellenthorpe and Milby. All these places became separate civil parishes in 1866.

Aldborough Hall was built in the early 17th century and is a grade II* listed building. In 1852, the Battle Cross, commemorating the Battle of Boroughbridge, was relocated to the village.

In 1931 the parish had a population of 543. On 1 April 1938 the civil parish of Aldborough was abolished and merged into the civil parish of Boroughbridge. In 1974 Aldborough was transferred from the West Riding to the new county of North Yorkshire. From 1974 to 2023 it was part of the Borough of Harrogate, it is now administered by the unitary North Yorkshire Council.

== Notable people ==
- Rose Ferraby, artist and archaeologist.
- Richard Aldborough, politician from the 1600s.
- Marion Paton, codebreaker at Bletchley Park.

== See also ==
- Aldborough (UK Parliament constituency)
- Ship Inn, Aldborough, Grade II listed public house
