= Ship Inn, Aldborough =

Grade II listed pub in Aldborough, England

Ship Inn
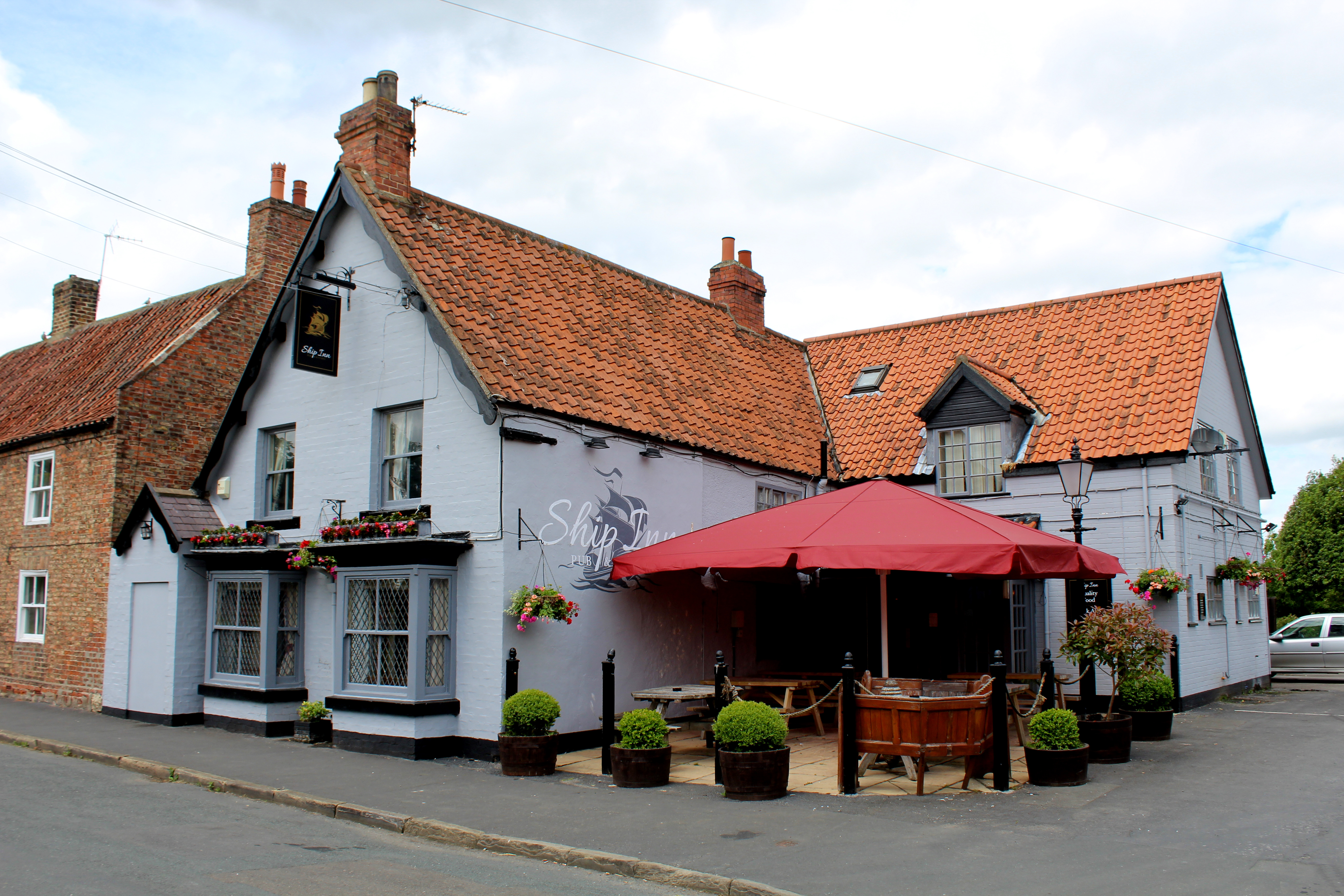
- The building in 2015
- Interactive map of the Ship Inn area

General information
- Type: Public house
- Location: Aldborough, North Yorkshire, England, Low Road
- Coordinates: 54°05′33″N 1°22′50″W
- Completed: late 16th century

Design and construction
- Designations

Listed Building – Grade II
- Official name: The Ship Inn
- Designated: 19 December 1984
- Reference no.: 1173823

The Ship Inn is a Grade II listed public house in Aldborough, North Yorkshire, England.

Between 2008 and November 2024, the pub was owned by Brian Rey and Elaine Howden, who came to prominence after Gordon Ramsay visited their previous pub, the Fenwick Arms, in Claughton, Lancashire, in a 2006 episode of Ramsay's Kitchen Nightmares.

Princes William and Harry dined at the Ship Inn in January 2011.

The building was damaged by fire in 2021. It gained new owners in 2025.

== See also ==
- Listed buildings in Boroughbridge
