= Boroughbridge =

Town and civil parish in North Yorkshire, England

Coordinates: 54°05′39″N 1°23′52″W

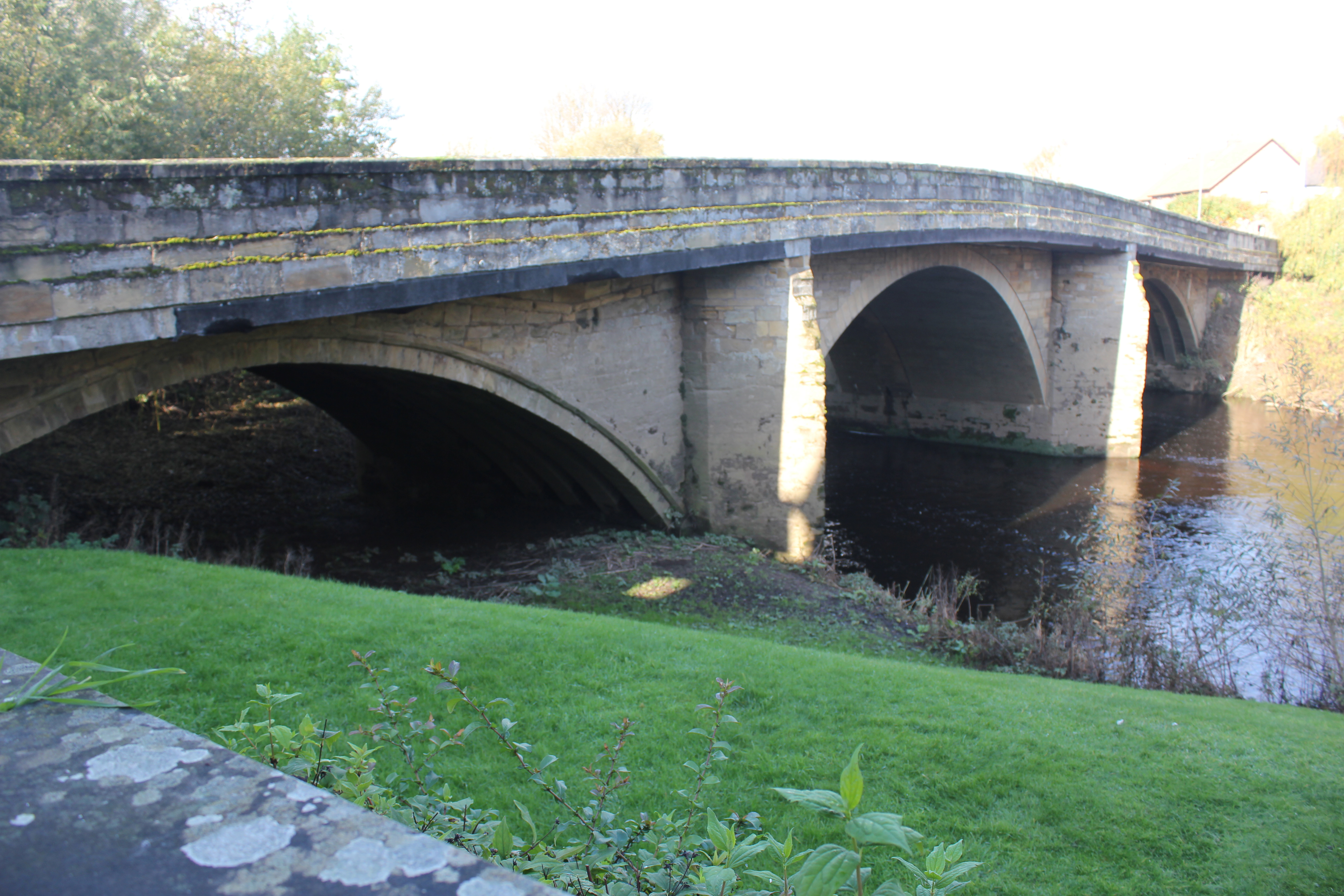
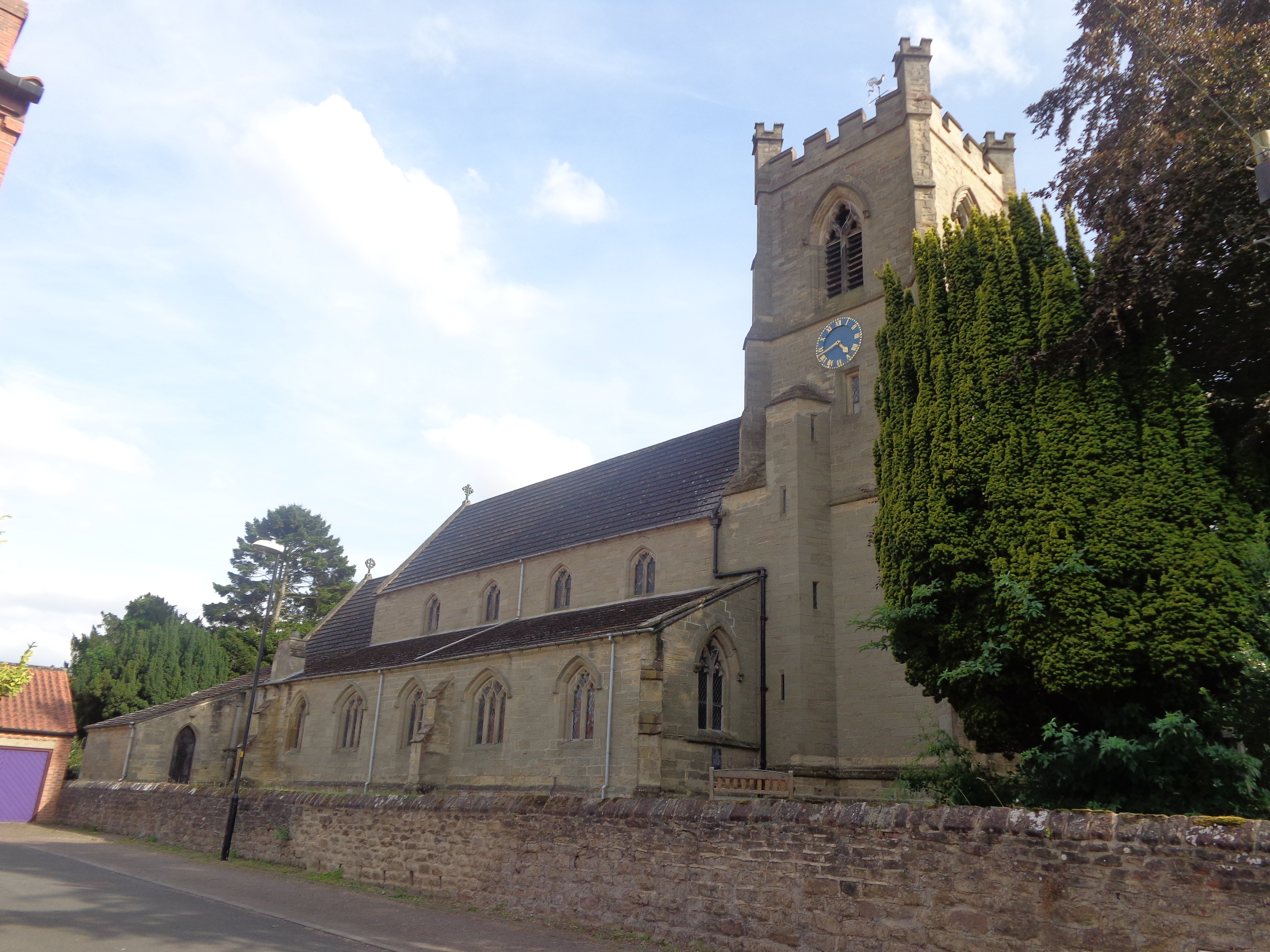
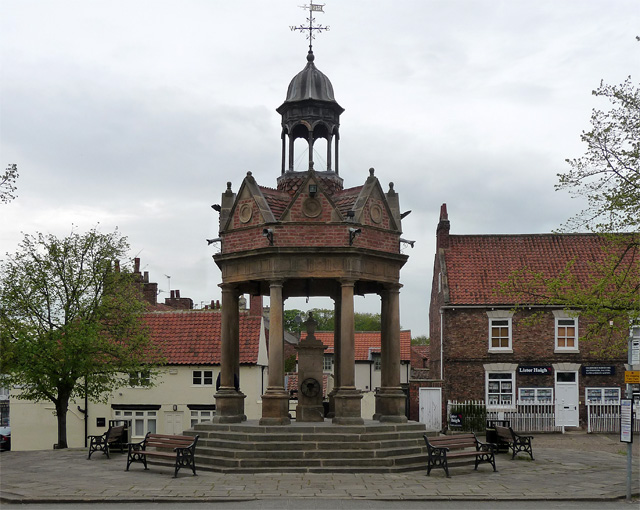
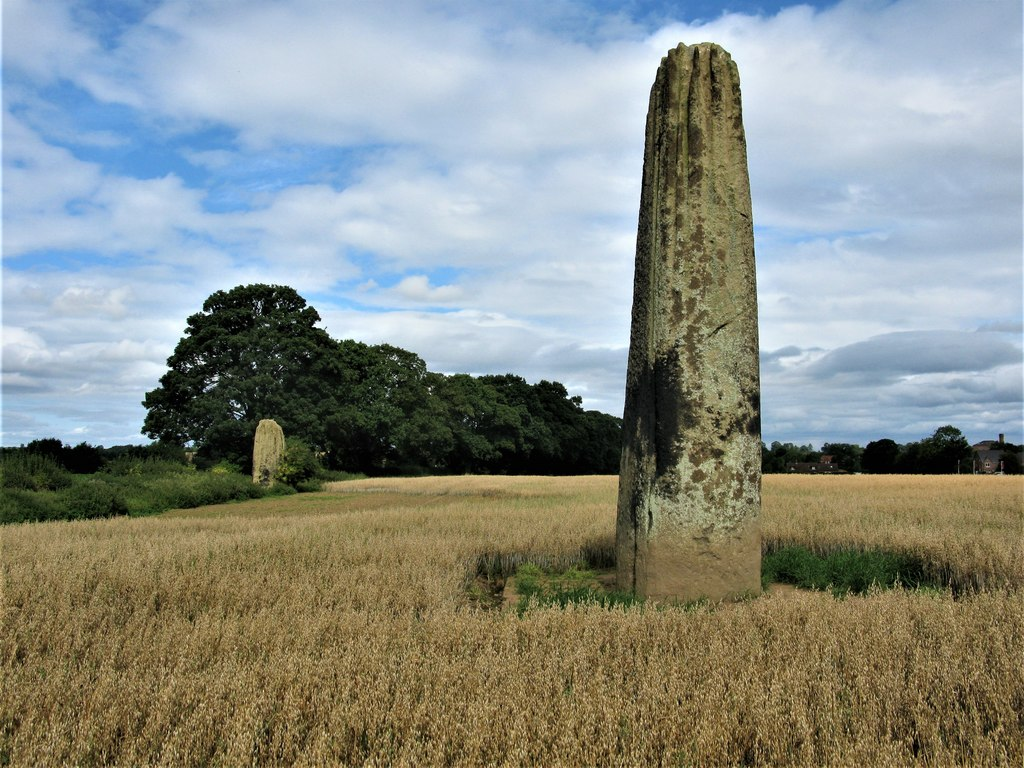
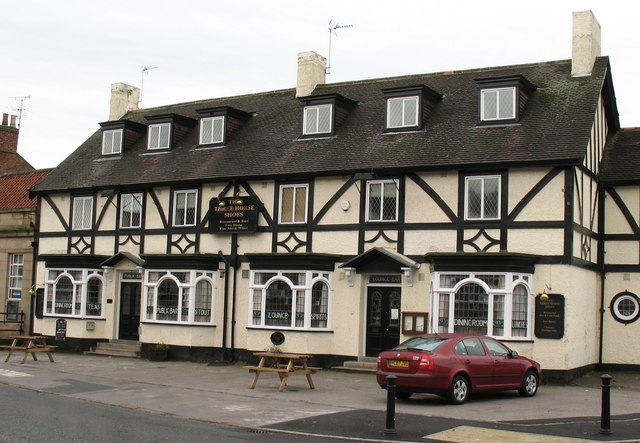
- Borough Bridge St James' Church The Market Well on St James Square Devil's Arrows Tap on the Tutt

- Location within North Yorkshire
- Population: 3,405 (2011 census)
- OS grid reference: SE393668
  - London: 185 mi (298 km) SSE
- Unitary authority: North Yorkshire
- Ceremonial county: North Yorkshire
- Region: Yorkshire and the Humber
- Country: England
- Sovereign state: United Kingdom
- Post town: YORK
- Postcode district: YO51
- Dialling code: 01423
- Police: North Yorkshire
- Fire: North Yorkshire
- Ambulance: Yorkshire
- UK Parliament: Wetherby and Easingwold

Boroughbridge (/ˈbʌrəbrɪdʒ/ BURR-ə-brij) is a town and civil parish in North Yorkshire, England. Historically part of the West Riding of Yorkshire, it is 16 miles (26 km) north-west of York. Until a bypass was built the town lay on the main A1 road from London to Edinburgh, which crosses the River Ure here.

The civil parish includes the villages of Aldborough and Minskip.

== History ==
=== Toponymy ===
The origin of the name 'Boroughbridge' lies in its location relative to Aldborough, the principal settlement during the Roman period and known as Isurium Brigantum. Dere Street, the Roman road heading north from York, originally crossed the River Ure just north of Aldborough, but at an unknown date the road was diverted to cross the river at Boroughbridge. The place was first mentioned in 1155 in the Latin form pontem de Burgo and by 1298 in the English form Burghbrig ('the bridge near Burgh or Aldborough'). A new town grew up at the bridge and the Old Town became known as the 'Ald-Borough'.

=== Early ===
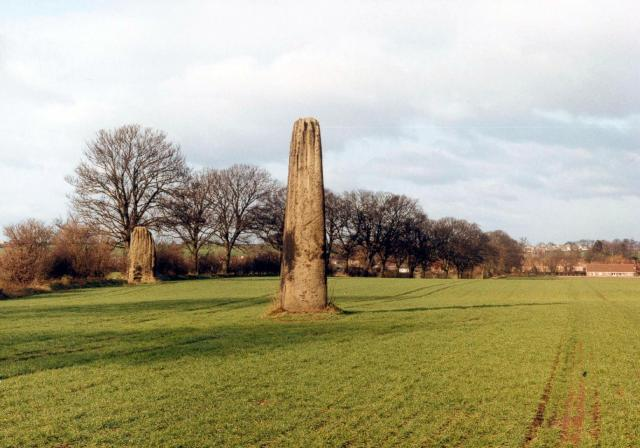
Devil's Arrows

A line of three menhirs, or standing stones, known as the Devil's Arrows, believed to have been erected in the Bronze Age, can be found on the outskirts of Boroughbridge, by the side of the A1. The tallest stone is 22 feet (6.7 m) tall. The stones are of millstone grit, quarried from Brimham Rocks, about 11 miles (18 km) to the west. The stones stand on an almost north–south alignment, with the central stone slightly offset. The first reference to the stones is from the journal of a fisherman, Peter Frankck, who visited Boroughbridge in 1694 and claims he saw seven stones. The antiquarian John Leyland saw four stones, which is the verifiable number. The absent fourth stone stood close to the central stone and was allegedly dug out and broken up by treasure hunters. According to tradition most of it was used to build Peg Bridge, which crosses the River Tutt as it enters the town, and the top of it was to be found in the grounds of Aldborough Hall, which stands between Boroughbridge and Aldborough. However, a 2026 study found that the Battle Cross at Aldborough has the same geological fingerprint as the surviving Arrows, supporting its identification as the repurposed fourth stone.

=== Medieval ===
Boroughbridge was not mentioned in Domesday Book of 1086, but was later described as part of the manor of Aldborough. In 1229 Boroughbridge, as part of the manor of Aldborough, was granted to Hubert de Burgh, but was forfeited a few years later by his son, who fought against the king at the Battle of Evesham in 1265. It then remained a royal manor until Charles I granted it to several citizens of London.

St James' Church, Boroughbridge originated as a Norman chapel-of-ease to St Andrew's Church, Aldborough, but was rebuilt on a new site in 1852. The Borough Bridge was in existence in the 12th century, and the current structure dates from 1562.

In 1318 Boroughbridge was devastated by the Scots under Sir James Douglas following the Capture of Berwick upon Tweed.

In 1322 the Battle of Boroughbridge took place as King Edward II overpowered Thomas, Earl of Lancaster, bringing about the end of Edward II's retaliation against those who had opposed him in the Despenser War of 1321–22. The Battle Cross, commemorating the event, was erected in the market square, but was moved to Aldborough in 1852.

=== Modern ===
From medieval times Boroughbridge was part of the parish of Aldborough in the West Riding of Yorkshire. In 1553 it became a parliamentary borough, electing two Members of Parliament to the unreformed House of Commons. It had a burgage franchise, meaning that the right to vote was tied to ownership of certain of property in the borough and had fewer than 100 qualified voters by the time it was abolished in the Reform Act of 1832. It was a pocket borough under the control of the Dukes of Newcastle. Augustus FitzRoy, who was Prime Minister as the 3rd Duke of Grafton, was elected MP for Boroughbridge in 1756 but never sat for the borough, preferring to represent Bury St Edmunds, where he had also been elected.

Boroughbridge was an important stage for stagecoaches because of its position on the Great North Road midway between London and Edinburgh. An advertisement in the Edinburgh Courant for 1754 reads:

The Edinburgh Stage-coach, for the better accommodation of passengers, will be altered to a New Genteel Two-end Glass Coach Machine, being on steel springs, exceeding light and easy, to go in ten days in Summer and twelve in Winter; to set out the first Tuesday in March, and continue it, from Hosea Eastgate's, the Coach and Horses, in Dean-Street, Soho, London; and from John Somerville's, in the Canongate, Edinburgh, every other Tuesday, and meet at Burrow-Bridge on Saturday night, and set out from thence on Monday morning, and get to London and Edinburgh on Friday. In Winter, to set out from London to Edinburgh every other (alternate) Monday morning, and to go to Burrowbridge on Saturday night; and to set out from thence on Monday morning, and get to London and Edinburgh on Saturday night. Passengers to pay as usual. Performed, if God permits, by your dutiful servant HOSEA EASTGATE.

Boroughbridge became a separate civil parish in 1866. In 1938 the civil parish absorbed the parishes of Aldborough and Minskip.

In 1945 the bridge carrying the A1 road over the River Ure collapsed under the weight of a heavy vehicle carrying an 80-ton steel mill roll housing from Sheffield to Falkirk. The incident interrupted the main transport route for a short time and the army installed a Bailey bridge until repairs were completed.

In 1974 Boroughbridge was transferred from the West Riding to the new county of North Yorkshire. It was part of the Borough of Harrogate between 1974 and 2023.

In 2011 the town's sewage works, which serves a population of ten thousand, was upgraded, with the old bar screens, which had reached the end of their working life, being replaced with modern wire-mesh drum screens able to screen out an increasingly large amount of undesirable waste and also filter grit and fat, thus decreasing the load on the plant. They were designed to meet the plant's stringent outfall requirements as set out by the Environment Agency. The settling and humus tanks were also upgraded from old manual sludging under hydrostatic head to circular tanks fitted with scrapers to desludge the tanks automatically.

== Community ==
Boroughbridge electoral ward had a population 3,104 at the 2011 Census.

The town has a primary school, and the secondary Boroughbridge High School. There is a Morrisons supermarket with petrol station and car wash, with independent businesses including cafes, bakeries, two butchers shops, a car dealership, and a hotel with health club.

Local news and television programmes are provided by BBC Yorkshire and BBC North East and Cumbria on BBC One and ITV Yorkshire and ITV Tyne Tees on ITV. Television signals are received from either the Emley Moor or Bilsdale transmitters.

Local radio stations are BBC Radio York on 104.3 FM and Greatest Hits Radio Harrogate and the Yorkshire Dales on 97.2 FM.

The town is served by the local newspaper, Harrogate Advertiser.

== See also ==
- Boroughbridge (UK Parliament constituency)
- Listed buildings in Boroughbridge
