= Tap on the Tutt =

Listed pub in North Yorkshire, England

- The pub in 2024
- Interactive map of the Tap on the Tutt area
- Former names: Three Horse Shoes

General information
- Type: Public house
- Location: Bridge Street, Boroughbridge, North Yorkshire, England
- Coordinates: 54.09677°N 1.39593°W
- Year built: c. 1930; 96 years ago
- Renovated: Late 20th century (altered)
- Client: Hepworth & Co

Design and construction
- Architect: Sydney Blenkhorn
- Designations

Listed Building – Grade II
- Official name: The Tap on the Tutt
- Designated: 3 July 2001
- Reference no.: 1245941

Website
- taponthetutt.co.uk

The Tap on the Tutt is a historic pub on Bridge Street in Boroughbridge, a town in North Yorkshire, England.

The pub was commissioned by Hepworth & Co, a brewer based in Ripon, for a site on the Great North Road. It was designed by Sydney Blenkhorn and opened around 1930. A rear extension was added in about 1950, but the building remained largely unchanged under long-term owners. In 2001, it was Grade II listed on the initiative of the Campaign for Real Ale (CAMRA). It is regarded by CAMRA as having an interior of "outstanding national historic importance" and is rated three stars in its grading scheme. The pub appeared on the organisation's National Inventory of Historic Pub Interiors, before the grading system was revised.

The pub was sold in 2003 and it was considered for conversion into a restaurant, but ultimately remained a pub. It was known for many years as the Three Horse Shoes, but became the "Tap on the Tutt" in 2023.

The two-storey building is in painted render with applied timber framing, and has a tile roof. The ground floor has four public rooms, arranged in a line: a dining room, public bar, lounge, and a second dining room. A further bay, recessed on the right, contains toilets. There is a servery behind, and a kitchen and service rooms at the rear. On the front are two doorways with triangular canopies, and four canted bay windows. The upper floor contains two-light casement windows, and in the roof are six flat-roofed dormers.

Inside the pub, most of the original fittings survive, other than fitted seating and the enlargement of openings between some of the rooms. They include the oak bar counter in the lounge, with a glazed screen above, bar back and fireplace surround, all in oak.

== See also ==
- Listed buildings in Boroughbridge
