= Isurium Brigantum =

Roman fort and town at Aldborough in North Yorkshire, England

Coordinates: 54.0908°N 1.3816°W

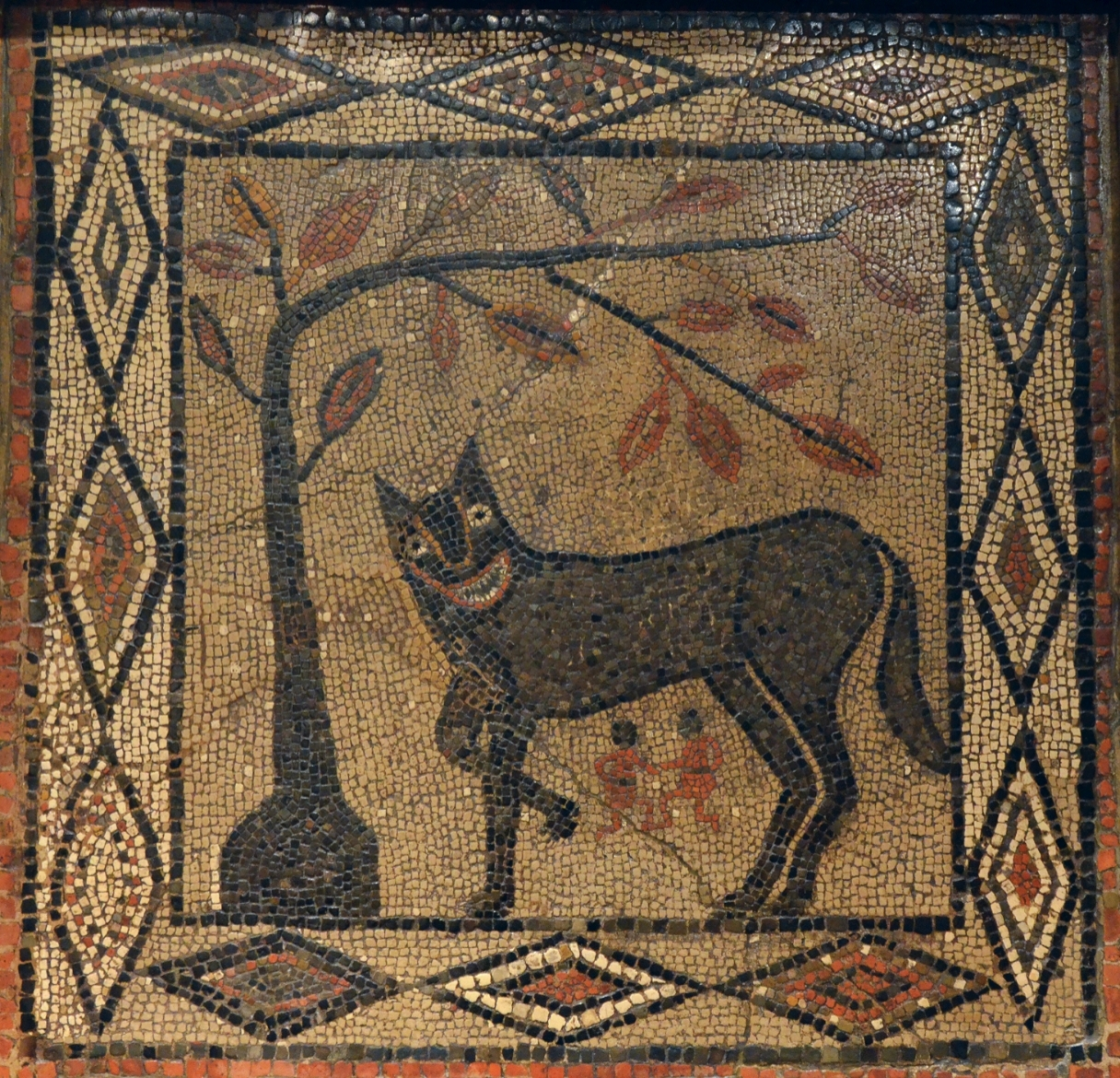
Mosaic depicting the She-wolf with Romulus and Remus, from Aldborough, (c.300 AD), Leeds City Museum (16025914306)

Isurium or Isurium of the Brigantes (Latin: Isurium Brigantum) was a Roman fort and town in the province of Britannia at the site of present-day Aldborough in North Yorkshire, England, in the United Kingdom. Its remains—the Aldborough Roman Site—are in the care of English Heritage.

The Roman road through the town formed a leg of both Dere Street—connecting Eboracum (York) to the Antonine Wall—and the Roman equivalent of Watling Street, which here connected Eboracum with Luguvalium (Carlisle). The modern village retains part of the Roman street plan and the church stands on the site of the forum.

Roman town walls and road plan of Isurium Brigantum, now the village of Aldborough, North Yorkshire.

== History ==
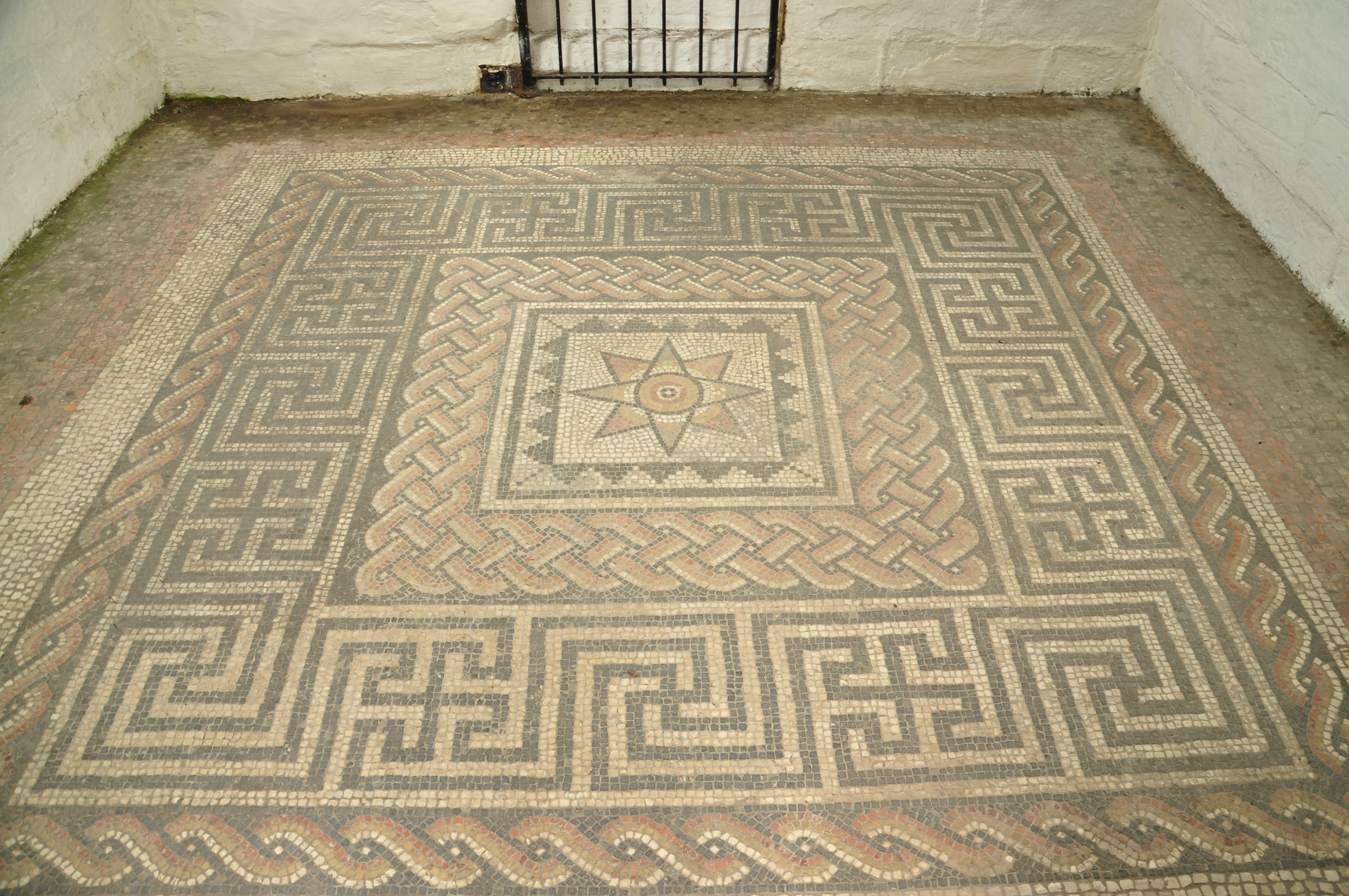
Mosaic floor, in situ.

Isurium Brigantum, one of the northernmost urban centres of the Roman Empire was probably founded in the late first century or early second century. The Roman civitas was the administrative centre of the Brigantes tribe, the largest and most northerly tribe in Roman Britain. Roman towns such as Exeter, Leicester, Chichester and Canterbury had the same status as Isurium.

Tacitus recorded that Isuer was the seat of Venutius, king of the Brigantes who was usurped from power by his wife, Cartismandua and her lover Volucatus at the beginning of the first century. Cartismandua welcomed the Romans who perceived little threat from the Brigantes and the Roman army focused its occupation to the south of Brigantium. When Venutius and his followers began to attack Brigantian centres towards the end of the first century, the Roman army pushed further north. Tacitus reports the final subjugation of the Brigantes came about by Julius Agricola in 79 AD. who then constructed Isurium.

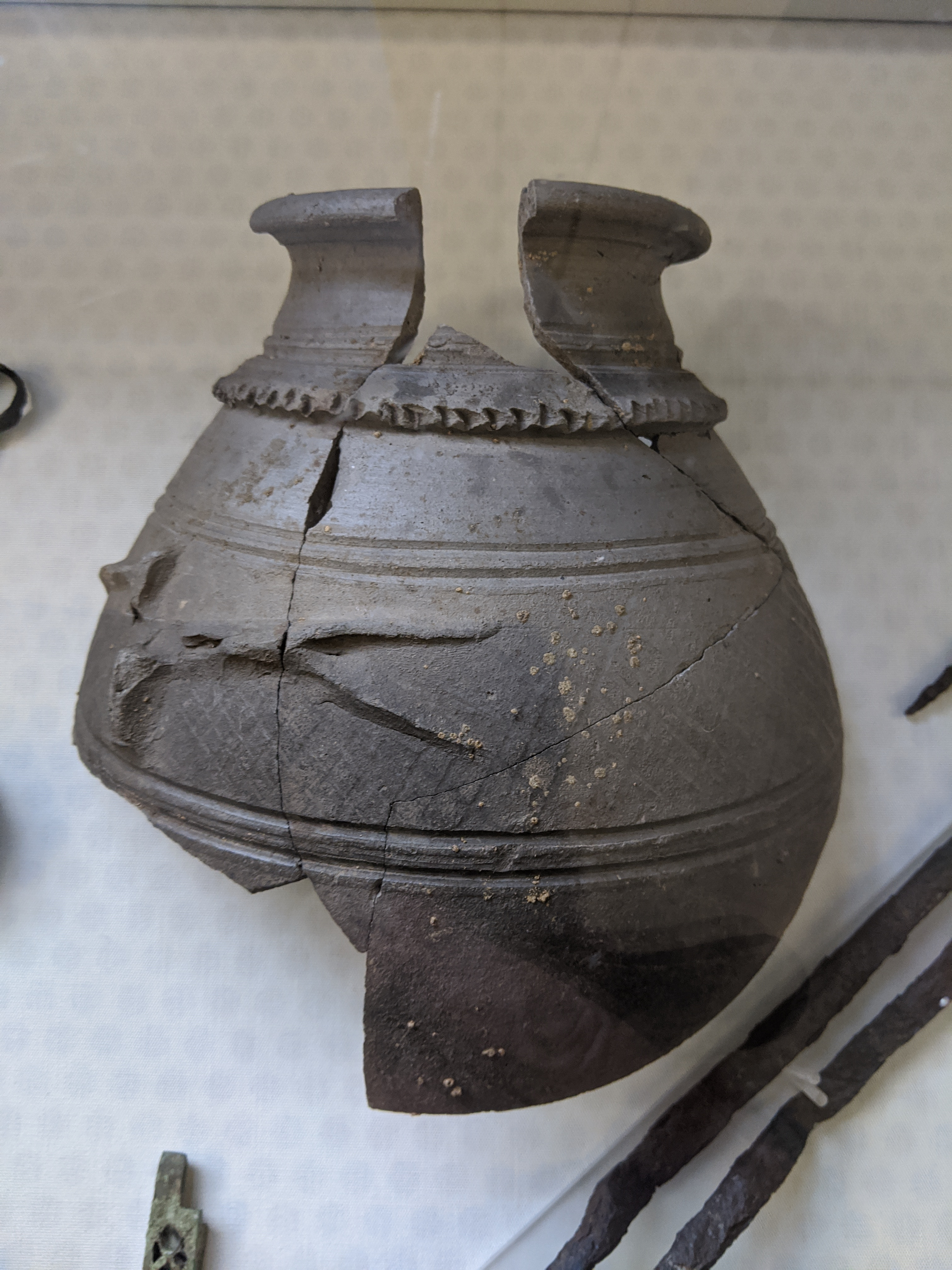
Part of a pot found in 2020, displayed in the museum

Its name is believed to be derived from the Latin name of the river Iseur now the River Ure. It is likely there was a Brigantian settlement at Isurium before the Roman invasion. There are many prehistoric sites along the A1 corridor which partially follows the route of Watling and Dere Streets. There are three ancient standing stones in Boroughbridge known as the Devil's Arrows a mile distant from the site.

There is in fact no archaeological evidence to suggest that there was a Brigantian settlement called Iseur: the most likely Iron Age settlement is Stanwick further north near Richmond where Cartimandua had her base. Isurium probably became a civilian settlement between the Roecliffe fort (see below) and the River Ure during the last part of the first century. The Civitas Capital was probably established in about 160 AD.

It was supposed that Isurium was the site of a 1st-century Roman fort where Watling and Dere Streets crossed the River Ure. Excavations in 1993 located two forts at Roecliffe near Boroughbridge and 1st-century finds at Aldborough most likely come from a related civilian site. Isurium Brigantum had substantial buildings from an early period; probably by the early 2nd century. Bank and ditch defences were erected later. Stone walls and four gates were added in the mid-3rd century. The visible remains are a small fraction of the Roman town. Isurium flourished for the next hundred years, with the building of elaborate private homes with fine decorative mosaic floors. In the middle of the 4th century, bastions were added to its defences and general unrest across the Empire seems to have affected the town's prosperity.

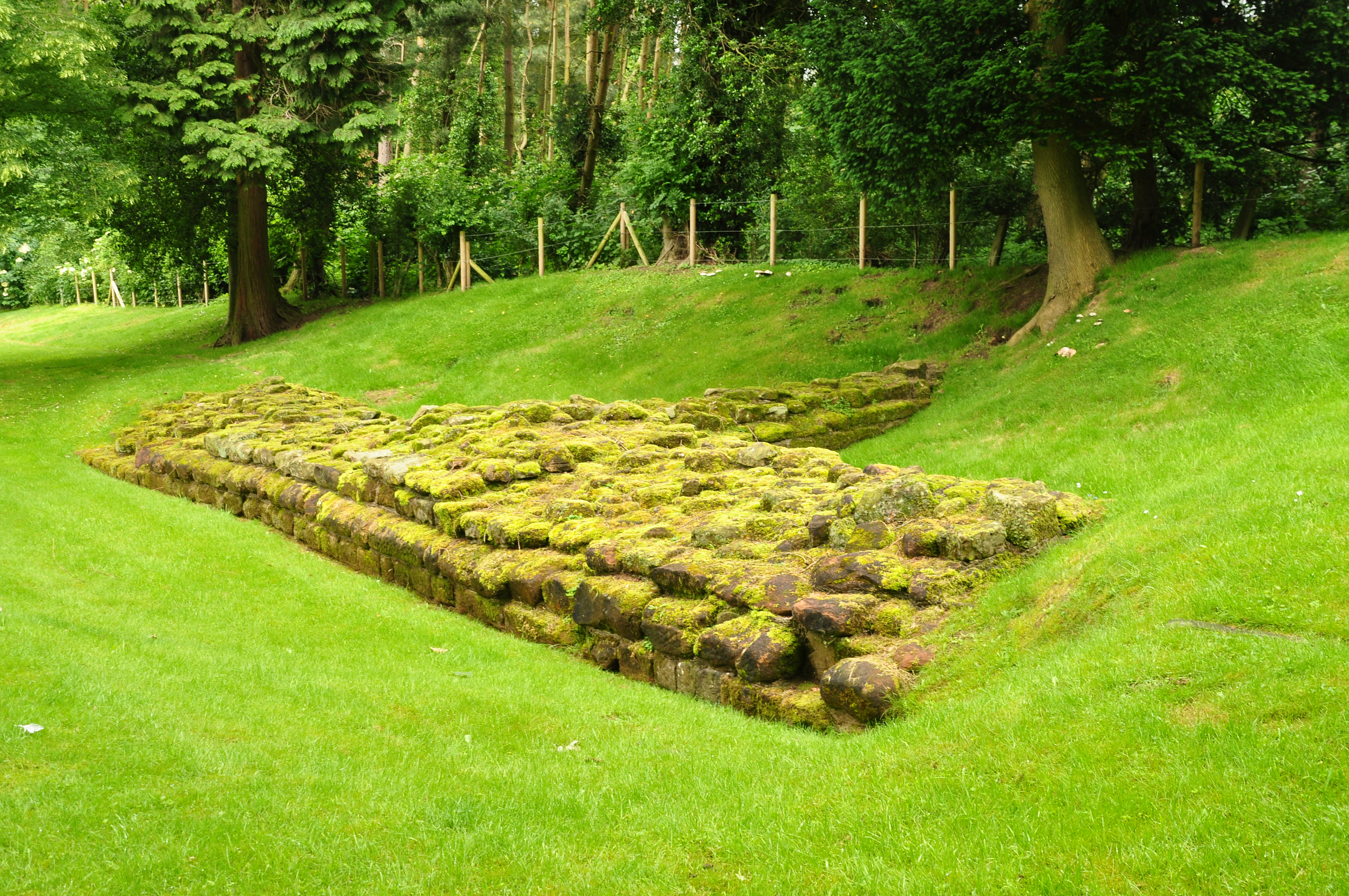
Part of the wall of the Roman town

There is little evidence of occupation after the end of Roman rule in Britain and by the 7th century the Anglo-Saxons had taken over the area.

== Archaeology ==
The 16th-century antiquary John Leland noted, "There be now large feeldes, fruteful of corn, in the very places where the howsing of the town was; and in these feeldes yereley be founde in ploughing many coynes of sylver and brasse of the Romaine stampe—Ther also have been found sepulchres, aqaue ductus tessalata paviamenta &.c." Two centuries after Leland, Daniel Defoe wrote "Not so much ruins, especially not above ground".

In 2011, geomagnetic scanning revealed the existence of an amphitheatre, emphasising Isurium's importance as a major Roman town.

The site came to prominence during excavations taking place in 2004. A young archaeologist, Daniel Ebdon, was using a metal detector for the first time and uncovered a Roman coin. This, along with others of its kind, can be found in The Yorkshire Museum, York.

== Aldborough Roman Site ==
Aldborough Roman Site is in the care of English Heritage and consists of a stretch of the massive town wall with its defensive towers and two in-situ mosaic pavements, once part of a Roman townhouse. Archaeological finds from the site are on display in the museum providing an insight into the lives of Roman civilians in its most northern capital.

Aldborough Roman town has been designated a scheduled monument under the Ancient Monuments and Archaeological Areas Act 1979.

The Aldborough Roman Town Project, led by Rose Ferraby and Martin Millett has been investigating the site since 2016. In 2019 Ferraby and sound artist Rob St John created a site specific audio trail exploring the Roman town.
