= Minskip =

Village in North Yorkshire, England

Coordinates: 54°04′37″N 1°24′27″W

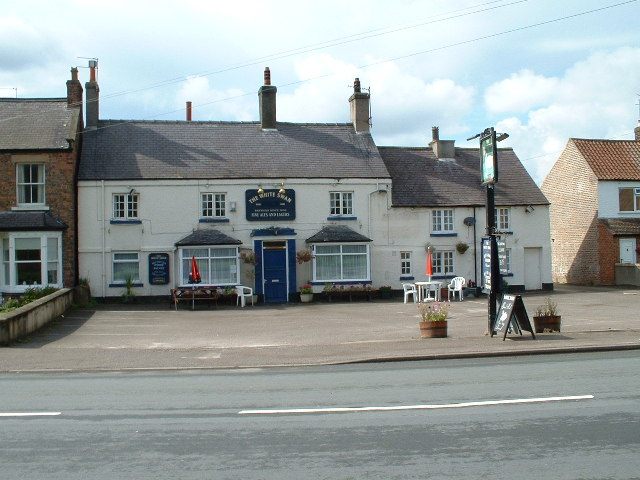
- The Wild Swan public house at the north end of Minskip

- Location within North Yorkshire
- OS grid reference: SE389646
- Civil parish: Boroughbridge
- Unitary authority: North Yorkshire
- Ceremonial county: North Yorkshire
- Region: Yorkshire and the Humber
- Country: England
- Sovereign state: United Kingdom
- Post town: YORK
- Postcode district: YO51
- Police: North Yorkshire
- Fire: North Yorkshire
- Ambulance: Yorkshire

Minskip is a village in the civil parish of Boroughbridge, in North Yorkshire, England. It is on the A6055 road and 1 mile south-west of Boroughbridge. Minskip appears in the Domesday Book as Minescip, a name derived from the Old English gemaenscipe meaning a community or communal holding.

St John's Church, Minskip, was built as a school in 1858, and converted into an Anglican chapel in 1907.

== Administration ==
Minskip was historically a township in the parish of Aldborough in the West Riding of Yorkshire. It became a separate civil parish in 1866, but on 1 April 1938 the civil parish was abolished and merged into the civil parish of Boroughbridge. In 1931 the parish had a population of 238. In 1974 Minskip was transferred from the West Riding to the new county of North Yorkshire. From 1974 to 2023 it was part of the Borough of Harrogate, it is now administered by the unitary North Yorkshire Council.

== Transport ==
Bus links are provided by Eddie Brown. The village is very close to the A1(M).
