= Battle of Boroughbridge =

1322 battle in England won by Edward II

- Part of Despenser War
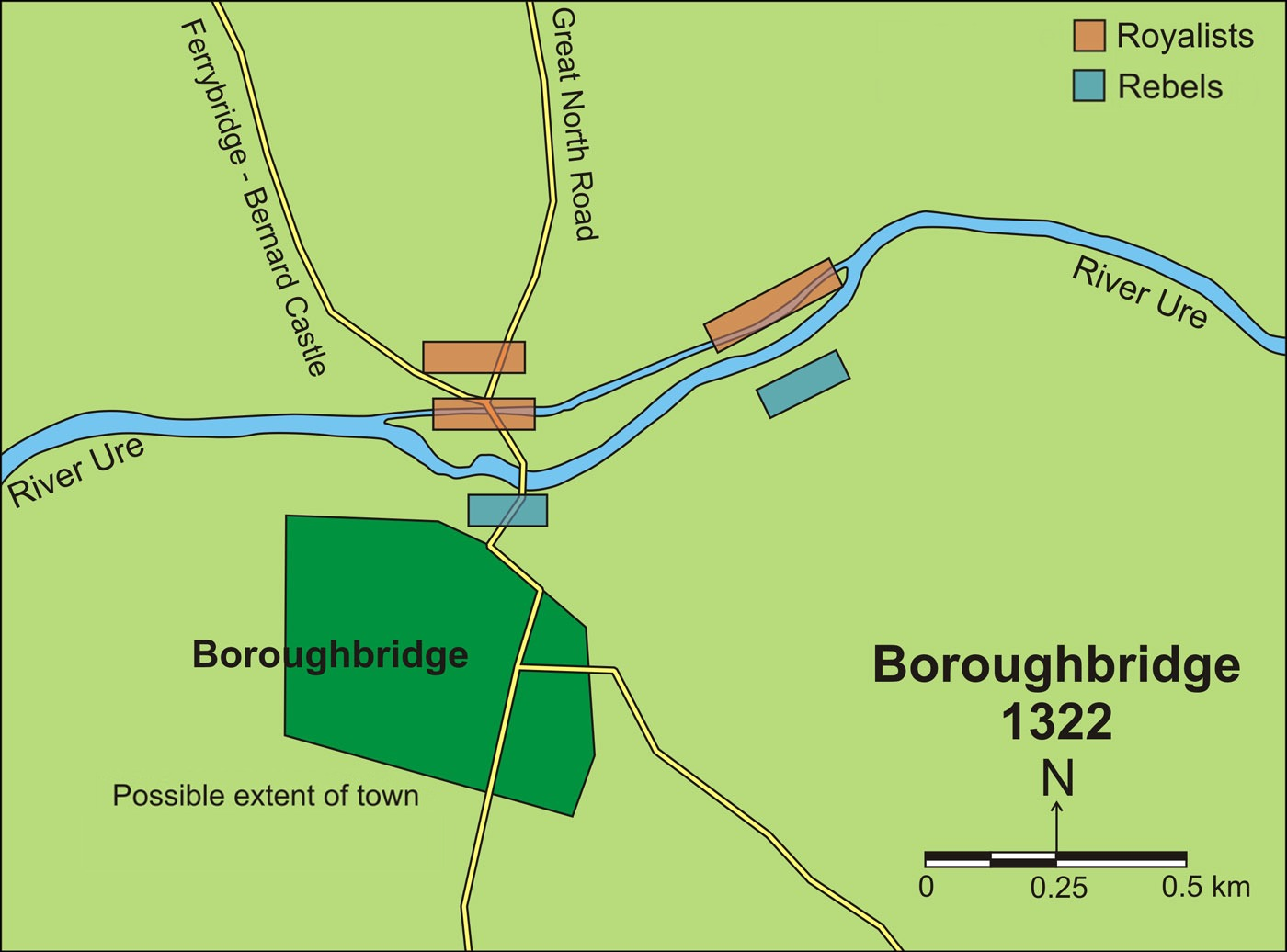
- Map of the battlefield
Date	16 March 1322
Location	Boroughbridge, Yorkshire, England 54°05′49″N 01°23′45″W
Result	Royalist victory

Belligerents
Royalists	Contrariants

Commanders and leaders
Andrew Harclay; John Peche	Earl of Lancaster (executed); Earl of Hereford †; Baron Clifford (executed)

Strength
c. 4,000	c. 1,000

Casualties and losses
Unknown	Unknown

The Battle of Boroughbridge was fought on 16 March 1322 in England between a group of rebellious barons and the forces of King Edward II, near Boroughbridge, north-west of York. The culmination of a long period of antagonism between the King and Thomas, Earl of Lancaster, his most powerful subject, it resulted in Lancaster's defeat and execution, ending the Despenser War. This allowed Edward to re-establish royal authority and hold on to power for almost five more years.

Though not a part of the Wars of Scottish Independence, the battle is significant for its employment of tactics learned in the Scottish wars in a domestic, English conflict. Both the extensive use of foot soldiers rather than cavalry and the heavy impact caused by the longbow represented significant steps in military developments.

== Background ==
Edward II was a weak and ineffectual king (made to look the more so by comparison with his father and son, Edward I and Edward III), and his reign was marked by military failure and internal strife. A great number of the barons turned against the King and Thomas of Lancaster eventually became the leader of the opposition. Lancaster was Edward's cousin and next to the King was the richest man in the country. Through a set of regulations known as the Ordinances, Lancaster and his associates had been trying to put restrictions on royal authority, but by the late 1310s Edward was again in full control of central government. The situation was aggravated by the King's ostentatious patronage of his favourite, Hugh Despenser, and Hugh's father by the same name.

In 1319 the King and Lancaster fell out during a failed campaign against Scotland. The next year Lancaster refused to attend a parliament summoned by the King, and later the same year Edward obtained papal absolution from his oath to follow the Ordinances. Meanwhile an inheritance dispute had broken out in the Welsh Marches between the Despensers and certain marcher lords, including Humphrey de Bohun, Earl of Hereford. Lancaster now took the initiative with the discontented. In 1321 he summoned two meetings of magnates, one at Lancaster's residence of Pontefract in March and the other at Sherburn in June. The meetings consisted of northern and marcher lords as well as Lancaster's own retainers, but little assistance was forthcoming from the northerners. The marcher rebellion and the threat of civil war forced the King to exile the younger Despenser, but the favourite was recalled within weeks.

Edward now seized the initiative and moved northwards. Lancaster convened one final meeting at Doncaster in November and also entered into an alliance with Robert I of Scotland to strengthen his hand against the King. In January 1322 Edward crossed the River Severn and secured the surrender of several of the marcher lords while Lancaster remained passive. As the royal army crossed the River Trent after the Battle of Burton Bridge Lancaster was forced to flee north. On 16 March Lancaster and his army had reached Boroughbridge by the River Ure, where they were joined by the Earl's Secretary, Sir Robert de Holland, and the force he had raised in Lancashire. There they were cut off by the forces of Sir Andrew Harclay, a veteran of the Scottish wars, who had gathered the levies from the counties of Cumberland and Westmorland.

== Battle ==
Map showing the location of Boroughbridge within England

When Lancaster arrived at the town of Boroughbridge, Harclay was already in possession of the bridge over the river. The rebel forces counted probably no more than 700 knights and men-at-arms against the 4,000 or so soldiers in the royal army. Lancaster initially tried to negotiate but Harclay could not be swayed. Since there was no realistic alternative place to cross the river and with the royal forces in pursuit from the south, the rebels had no choice but to fight. The ensuing battle was short and one-sided.

Harclay had deployed his men on foot to hold the bridge from the northern side. Additional forces were placed at a nearby ford, though contemporary sources do not specify the exact location of this ford. The royal pikemen were deployed in a schiltron formation, a tactic learned from the Scots in the Scottish wars. The formation proved effective against the oncoming cavalry. The rebels divided into two columns; one led by Hereford and Roger de Clifford, attacking the bridge on foot, the other under Lancaster, trying to cross the ford by horse. According to a graphic description in the chronicle the Brut, Hereford was killed as he crossed the bridge by a pikeman hiding underneath, who thrust his spear up through the earl's anus. Clifford was also severely injured, and that column of the army fell into disarray. Lancaster's party fared little better; under heavy archery fire his cavalry was cut off before it even reached the ford, and was forced to retreat. This event shows an early—if not entirely novel—effective use of the longbow against cavalry, a tactic which was to become central to future English military success.

Lancaster negotiated a truce with Harclay, and withdrew to the town. During the night a great number of the rebels deserted, and the next day the Sheriff of York arrived from the south with additional forces. Lancaster, now greatly outnumbered and with no chance of retreat, had no choice but to surrender to Harclay.

== Aftermath ==
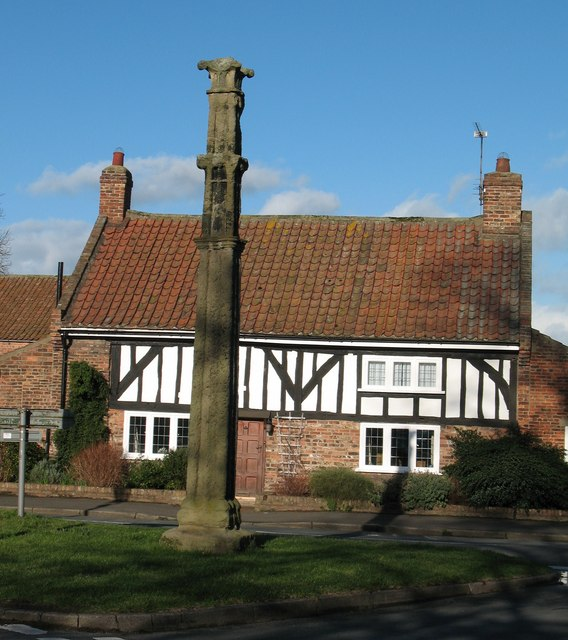
Monument for the Battle of Boroughbridge in nearby Aldborough

Thomas of Lancaster was taken to Pontefract Castle, which by then had fallen to the King. There he was submitted to what was little more than a show trial and—in front of a gathering of earls and barons—sentenced to death. On 22 March 1322 he was led out of the castle and beheaded in front of a jeering crowd. Subsequently a cult emerged around the person of the late earl as a martyr and even a possible saint. Lancaster had shown no signs of extraordinary piety nor other personal abilities during his lifetime and the cult has been interpreted as a reaction to the incompetent and oppressive reign of Edward II.

Some thirty of Lancaster's followers were also executed, among these Clifford and the baron John Mowbray. Clifford was hung from Clifford's Tower in York, which is now named after him.

Andrew Harclay was richly rewarded for his loyal and competent performance at Boroughbridge. On 25 March he was created Earl of Carlisle and promised lands worth 1,000 marks yearly. Yet Harclay, who had turned down Lancaster's overtures to join in the rebellion, was no great adherent of the King. As a warden of the Scottish Marches he grew constantly more frustrated with the King's idleness, and eventually negotiated a peace treaty with the Scots. This action on Harclay's part amounted to treason and early in 1323 he was apprehended by the King's men and hanged, drawn and quartered.

As for Edward II himself, his dependence on the Despensers grew only deeper and their transgressions more severe. Lancaster's supporters (including Roger Mortimer, William Trussell and Robert de Holland) found themselves systematically accused of false charges, being imprisoned and having their lands taken over by the Despensers. Mortimer and Trussell eventually fled to Paris, where they were to be joined by Edward's estranged wife, Isabella, who may have become Mortimer's lover.

In 1327 Isabella and Mortimer staged a coup against the King. Edward II was deposed and his son, Edward III, succeeded him.

== Sources ==
- Holland, Edgar (1902). A History of the Family of Holland of Mobberley and Knutsford. Edinburgh: Ballantyne Press.
- McKisack, May (2004) [1959]. The Fourteenth Century: 1307–1399. Oxford: Oxford University Press. ISBN 0-19-821712-9.
- Maddicott, J. R. (1970). Thomas of Lancaster, 1307–1322: A study in the reign of Edward II. Oxford: Oxford University Press. ISBN 0-19-821837-0.
- Prestwich, M. C. (2005). Plantagenet England: 1225–1360. Oxford: Oxford University Press. ISBN 0-19-822844-9.

== External sources ==
- The Battle of Boroughbridge at The Battlefields Trust.
- English Heritage Battlefield Report: Boroughbridge 1322
