= Rose Ferraby =

British archaeologist, Romanist and artist

- Education: University of Cambridge Edinburgh College of Art University of Exeter
- Occupations: Archaeologist; artist

Rose Ferraby is an archaeologist and artist, who has worked extensively on the Roman town of Isurium Brigantium in North Yorkshire.

== Education ==
Ferraby has an MFA from Edinburgh College of Art and a BA in Archaeology from the University of Cambridge. She completed her PhD at the University of Exeter in 2015, entitled 'Stone Exposures: a Cultural Geology of the Jurassic Coast'.

== Career ==
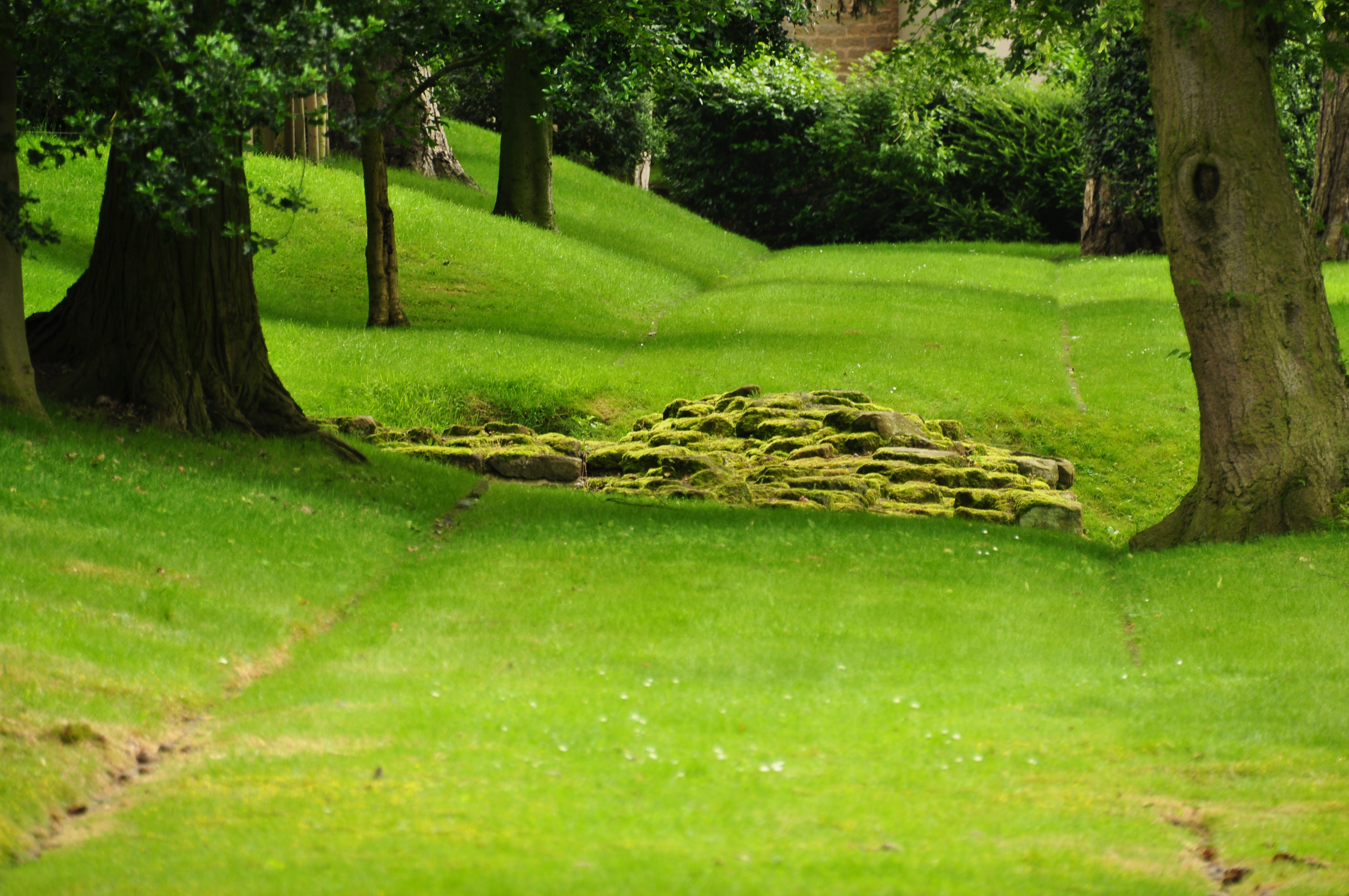
Roman ruins in Aldborough

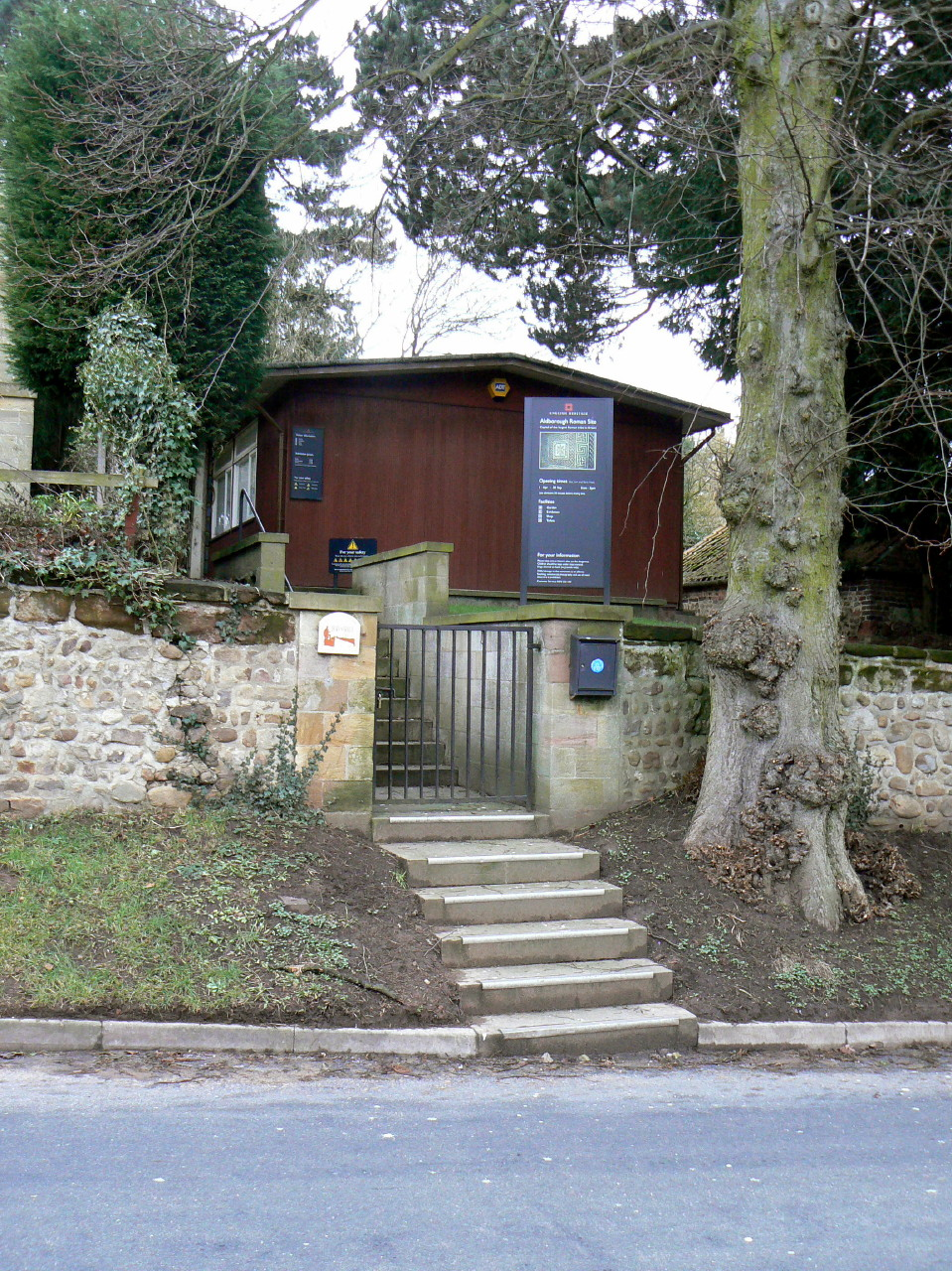
Aldborough Roman Town

Rose Ferraby is a Research Associate in the Faculty of Classics at the University of Cambridge. She is co-director of the Aldborough Roman Town Project. Prior to her PhD research, she worked as an archaeologist for the British School at Rome, where she worked on numerous sites, including Falacrinae, the birthplace of Vespasian. Her expertise includes Roman Britain and using digital techniques to understand landscapes, publishing on photogrammetry on the Jurassic Coast. Ferraby has also published on archaeological landscapes of rainforest in Sarawak, part of a collaborative project at the Museum of Archaeology and Anthropology, University of Cambridge, as well as on the surveys of Roman Aldborough. In 2020 she and Martin Millett published Isurium Brigantium: an archaeological survey of Roman Aldborough which was described by Michael Fulford as "the essential foundation upon which to build future research at Aldborough".

=== Creative practice ===
In addition and alongside archaeology, Ferraby explores landscape histories through creative practice. She collaborated with archaeologist Mark Edmonds on the 2013 publication 'Stonework' which examined prehistoric landscapes in Cumbria through poetry and art. Other collaborations include with Common Ground to produce a tree map of Exeter in 2016 and in 2019 a collaboration with sound artist Rob St. John. This project examined the sub-surface landscapes of Aldborough Roman town through field recording, print-making and illustration to produce a walkable trail exploring the site.

BBC Radio 3 invited her to present a programme on gypsum in 2018, as a result of her interdisciplinary approach to art and archaeology. In addition she writes on how the intersection between the two informs her practice across both disciplines.

As an illustrator, Ferraby has worked on a number of book projects including Tenter by Susie Campbell, which is inspired by the Bayeux Tapestry.

=== Selected publications ===
- Isurium Brigantum: an archaeological survey of Roman Aldborough (Society of Antiquaries of London, 2020).
- 'The Quarry: Stories from Fragments', Norwegian Archaeological Review 53 (2020).
- 'Geophysics: creativity and the archaeological imagination', Internet Archaeology 44.

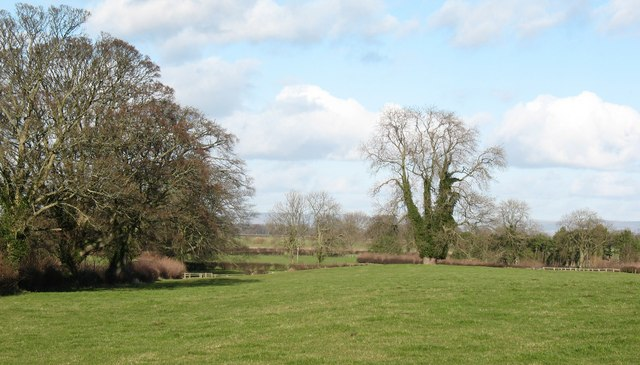
Field at Aldborough
