= St Andrew's Church, Aldborough =

Grade I listed church in North Yorkshire, England

Coordinates: 54°05′32″N 1°22′51″W

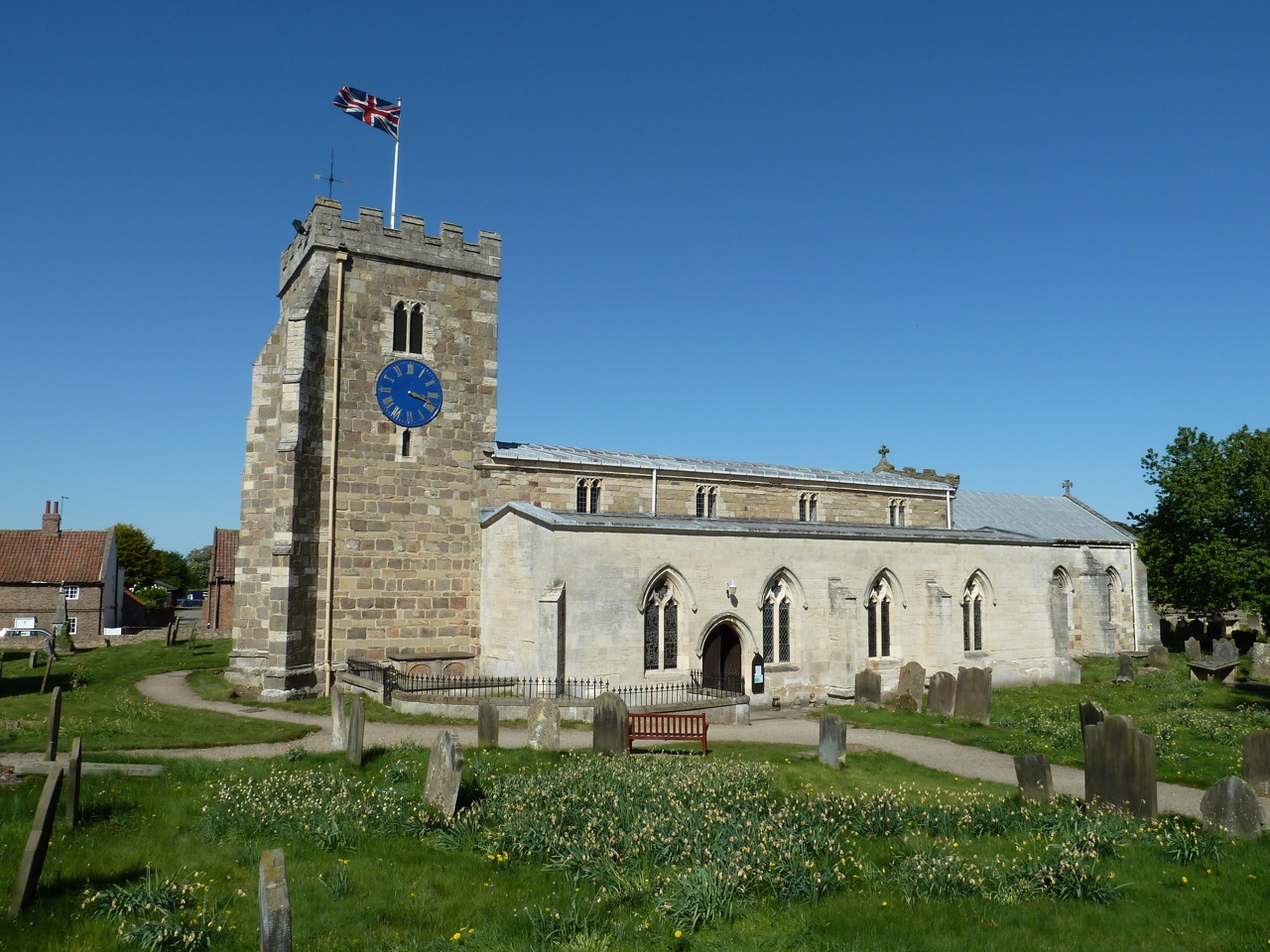
The church, in 2011

St Andrew's Church is the parish church of Aldborough, North Yorkshire, a village in England.

Aldborough is the site of the Roman town of Isurium Brigantum, and it is believed that the church lies on the site of a temple to Mercury. Two churches successively occupied the site before the present building was commenced, in the early 14th century. In 1318, the building was partly destroyed by raiders from Scotland, but it was repaired, with a north chantry chapel added in 1333, and the north aisle dating from about 1360. The clerestory dates from the 15th century, the roof was restored in the 16th century, and the south aisle was rebuilt in 1827. The church was Grade I listed in 1966.

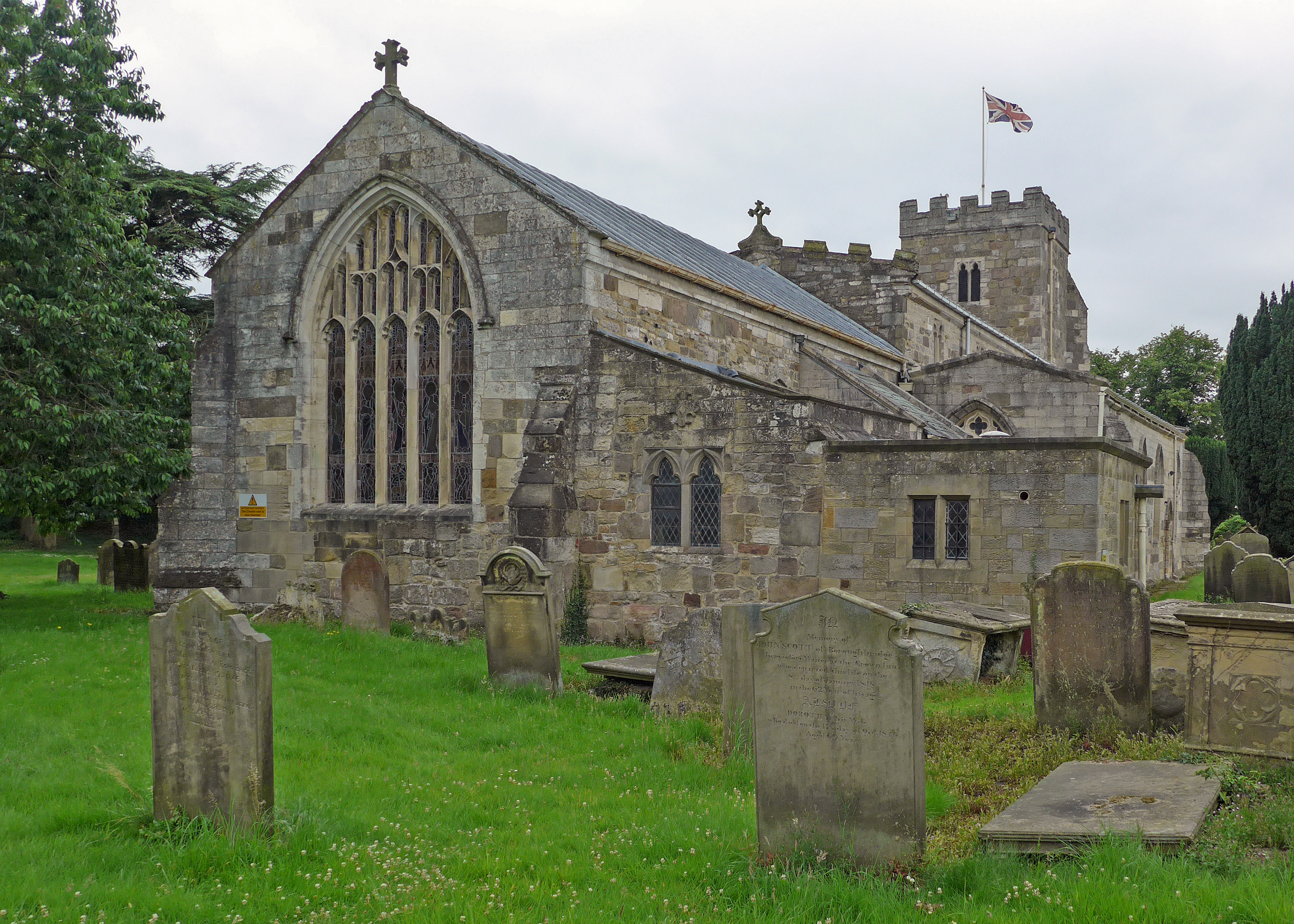
The east end of the church, in 2016

The church is built of red sandstone with a lead roof, and consists of a nave with a clerestory, north and south aisles, a chancel, a north chapel, and a west tower. The tower has angle buttresses, a west window with a pointed arch and hood mould, a clock face on the west side, two-light bell openings, and an embattled parapet. The east window has five lights and is in Perpendicular style.

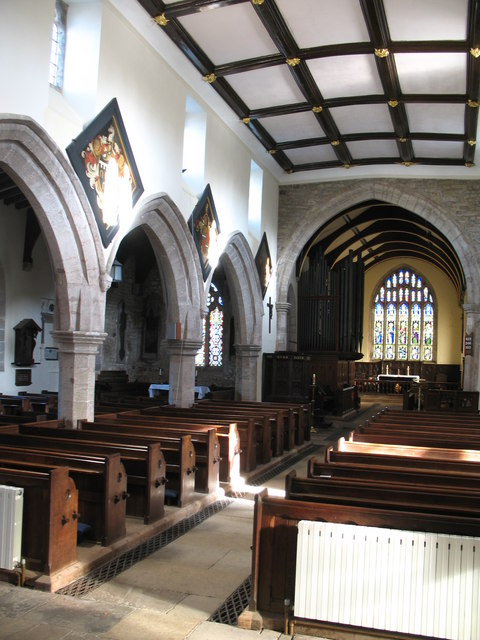
View from the nave into the chancel

Inside, the roof is panelled, with bosses. There is Mediaeval stained glass in the north aisle, and 14th-century canopies which would originally have sheltered figures. There is a weathered Roman sculpture which may represent Mercury, a 16th-century panel depicting Daniel in the Lion's Den, and a brass of William of Adleburgh, dating from around 1360. There is 17th-century panelling in the chancel, moved from elsewhere, a communion rail from about 1700, and 18th-century breadshelves.

== See also ==
- Grade I listed buildings in North Yorkshire (district)
- Listed buildings in Boroughbridge
