= Hallikeld =

Former administrative area of Yorkshire, England

- Wapentake
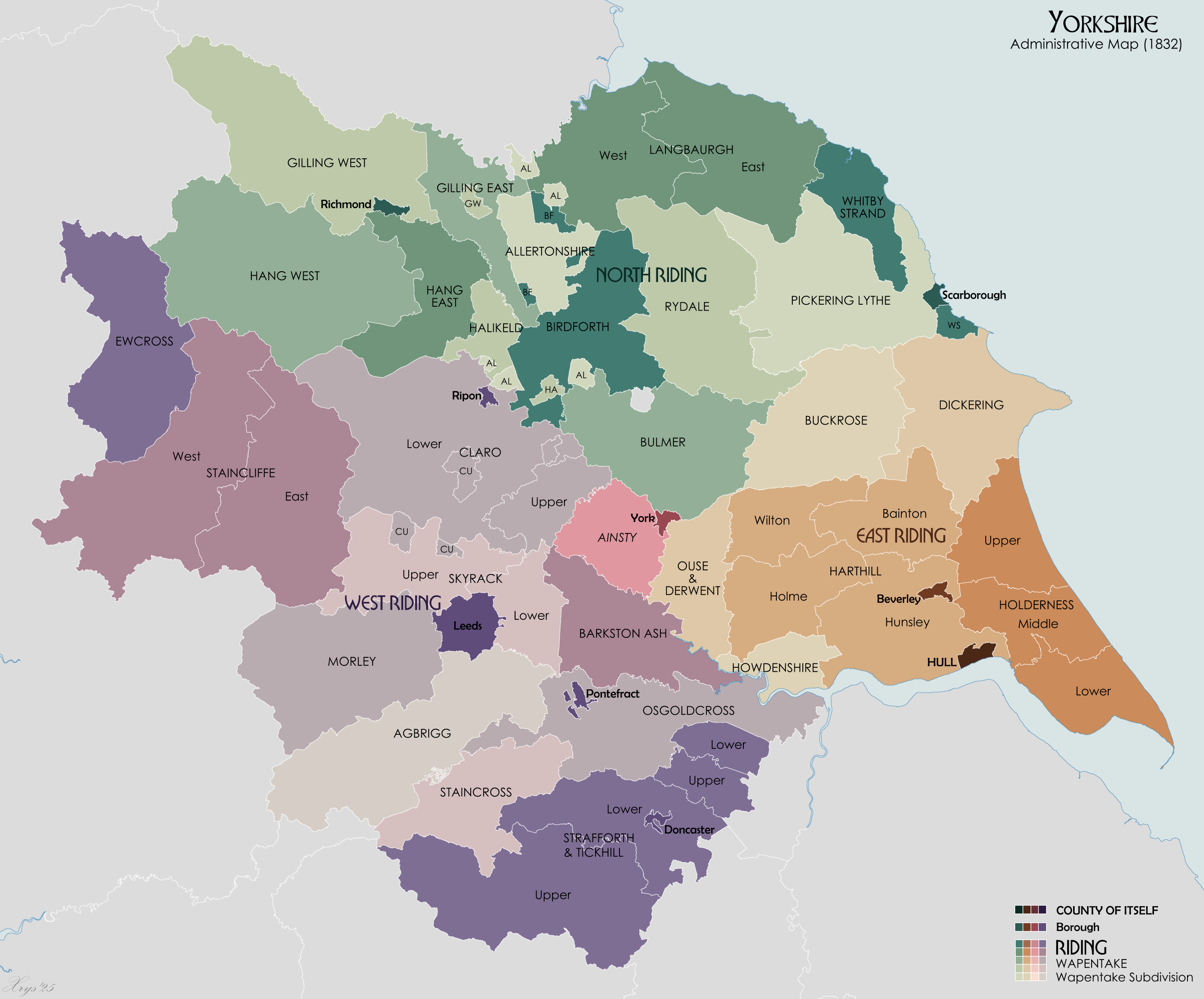
- Wapentakes of Yorkshire. Hallikeld is a light green colour just above Ripon.
- Area
  - Coordinates: 54.252°N 1.546°W
- Status: Defunct
- Subdivisions
  - Type: 7 parishes (1914)

Hallikeld (Note: Sometimes spelt as Hallikell, or Halikeld. The wapentake did not include the hamlet of Hallikeld which is north east of Northallerton; this hamlet was in Allertonshire.) was a wapentake, an administrative division (or ancient district) analogous to a hundred, in the historic county of the North Riding of Yorkshire. It was one of the smaller wapentakes by area and consisted of seven parishes.

== History ==
The name Hallikeld derives from the Old English Halig, and the Old Norse Kelda. Keld appears in various places in Northern England and means Spring, with the Halli prefix meaning holy. This is thought to be taken from some fresh water springs in the Melmerby area, which were located within the wapentake. Fields to the south of Melmerby are labelled as Hallikelds on Ordnance Survey mapping from 1909. As the wapentakes were ancient divisions, the spelling of them has evolved and changed over time. Latterly it was spelt as Hallikeld, but has been historically recorded as Hallikell and Halikeld. Another possible derivation of the name is from a holy spring in the churchyard of St Lamberts in Burneston, though the spring and drain from it have been covered over.

Portions of the wapentake were interchanged with Hang East and Birdforth wapentakes. At times, the wapentake was considered to be in the West Riding of Yorkshire, despite being on the north bank of the River Ure, which was the historical dividing line between the West and North Ridings of Yorkshire. In 1914, the wapentake had seven parishes; Burneston, Cundall, Kirkby Hill (or Kirkby on the Moor), Kirklington, Pickhill, Wath and West Tanfield. Hallikeld was bordered on the north by Gilling East, on the east by Birdforth, the south by Claro and the west by Hang East. The River Ure formed its southern border and the River Swale formed its eastern and Northern border. The wapentake was some 16 miles (26 km) long (from north to south) and at its widest, only 7 miles (11 km) across.

The boundaries of the wapentakes were being constantly redrawn; in the early part of the 19th century, Hutton Conyers was in Hallikeld, and Exelby, Leeming and Newton was transferred into the district at the same time.

In 1831, the number of houses in the wapentake was listed as 1,419 spread across 1,395 families. The population at that time was 6,424, which by 1885, had dropped to 5, 441.

== Settlements ==
- Key to parishes: BE = Bedale, BR = Brafferton, BU = Burneston, CU = Cundall, KB = Kirby-on-the-Moor, KK = Kirklington, PK = Pickhill, TO = Topcliffe, TW = Tanfield West, WA = Wath
- Key to Poor Law Unions (PLU): Bedale = B, Great Ouseburn = G, Thirsk = T

List of townships in Hallikeld Wapentake
| Name | Parish | Population | PLU | Name | Parish | Population | PLU | Name | Parish | Population | PLU |
|---|---|---|---|---|---|---|---|---|---|---|---|
| Ainderby Quernhow | PK | 107 | T | Howe | PK | 33 | T | Norton-le-Clay | CU | 146 | G |
| Asenby | TW | 238 | G | Howgrave | KK | 25 | G | Pickhill with Roxby | PK | 388 | T |
| Baldersby | TW | 267 | G | Humburton with Milby | KB | 139 | G | Rainton with Newby | TO | 411 | G |
| Burneston | BU | 342 | B | Kirby-on-the-Moor | KB | 189 | G | Sinderby | PK | 93 | T |
| Carthorpe | BU | 304 | T | Kirklington | KK | 305 | B | Swainby with Allerthorpe | PK | 27 | B |
| Cundall and Leckby | CU | 200 | G | Langthorne | BE | 136 | B | Sutton | KK | 121 | G |
| Dishforth | TW | 332 | G | Langthorpe | KB | 196 | G | Theakstone (Note: Ancient spelling of Theakston) | BU | 82 | B |
| East Tanfield (Note: Sometimes written as Tanfield (East).) | KK | 35 | G | Marton-le-Moor | TW | 209 | G | Thornton Bridge | BR | 47 | G |
| Exelby, Leeming and Newton (Note: Later transferred back to Hang East) | BU | 633 | B | Melmerby | WA | 338 | G | Wath | WA | 196 | G |
| Gatenby | BU | 69 | B | Middleton Quernhow | WA | 123 | G | West Tanfield | TW | 693 | G |

The populations given are for the year of 1831. In 1821, the parishes of Bedale, Brafferton, Pickhill, Topcliffe and Wath crossed the borders into the adjacent wapentakes (Hang East, Bulmer, Allertonshire, Birdforth and Allertonshire respectively.
