= Matthew Robinson (priest) =

Church of England clergyman and physician

The Reverend Matthew Robinson
- Vicar of Burneston
- Province: York
- Diocese: York

Personal details
- Born: Rokeby, County Durham
- Baptised: 14 December 1628
- Died: 27 November 1694 (aged 65) Ripley, North Riding of Yorkshire
- Buried: Church of St. Lambert, Burneston
- Denomination: Anglican
- Spouse: Jane Pickering (m. 1657)
- Profession: Physician
- Education: St. John's College, Cambridge

Matthew Robinson (1628 – 1694) was an English cleric, Anglican divine, and physician.

== Life ==
=== Origins and education ===
Matthew Robinson, baptised at Rokeby, Yorkshire, on 14 December 1628, was the third son of Thomas Robinson, barrister, of Gray's Inn, and Frances, daughter of Leonard Smelt, of Kirby Fletham, Yorkshire. When, in 1643, his father was killed fighting for the Parliament in the Civil War, Matthew was recommended as page to Sir Thomas Fairfax. But it was decided that he should continue his education; and in October 1644 he arrived at Edinburgh. In the spring the plague broke out, and he left. In May 1645 he made his way to Cambridge, which he reached, after some hairbreadth escapes, on 9 June. A few days after he began his studies Cambridge was threatened by the Royalists. He and a companion, while trying to escape to Ely, were brought back by "the rude rabble". Robinson now offered his services to the governor of the town, and until the dispersal of the King's forces undertook military duty every night.

On 4 November he was admitted scholar of St. John's College. His tutor, Zachary Cawdry, became his lifelong friend. Robinson excelled in metaphysics, and for recreation translated, but did not publish, the Book of Canticles into Latin verse. He graduated BA in 1648 and MA in 1652. In 1649 he was elected a fellow of Christ's College, but the election was disallowed by "mandamus from the powers then in being". A resolve to go to Padua was defeated by want of money. On 13 April 1650, however, he was elected fellow of St. John's. He now resumed his studies, and particularly that of physic, which he meant to make his profession. He "showed his seniors vividissections of dogs and suchlike creatures in their chambers". Sir Thomas Browne ("Dr. Brown of Norwich") sent him "epistolary resolutions of many questions".

After studying medicine "not two full years", he was persuaded by his mother to accept presentation to the family living of Burneston, Yorkshire. He went into residence in August 1651. Meanwhile his medical advice was in great request, and Sir Joseph Cradock, the commissary of the archdeaconry of Richmond, procured him a license to practise as a physician. He had much success, especially in the treatment of consumption.

=== Career and works ===
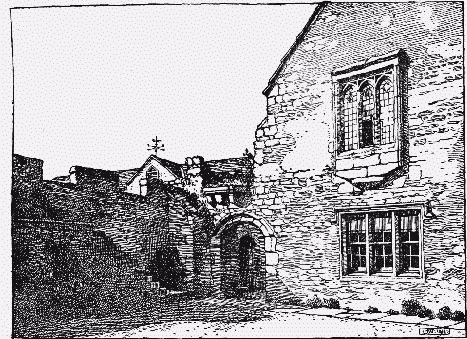
The Robinson Almshouses, Burneston

Both Robinson and Cawdry had scruples about the Act of Uniformity, which their bishop, Brian Walton of Chester, took great pains to satisfy. (Note: Newcome, Diary, 8 August 1662.) Robinson had much respect for Nonconformists; and he allowed some of them to preach in his parish. (Note: Newcome, Autobiography, pp. 218, 227, 295, &c.; Calamy, Account, p. 158.) Plurality and non-residence he "utterly detested", and was "of my Lord Verulam's judgement" as to the desirability of many other Church reforms. He wrote his Cassander Reformatus to "satisfy the dissenters every way", but did not publish it. In September 1682 he resigned the living of Burneston in favour of his nephew, and removed to Ripley, where, for two years, he managed Lady Ingleby's estates. (Note: "Diary of George Grey" in Surtees's Durham, ii. 15) At Burneston he erected and endowed two free schools and a hospital.

In 1685 or 1686 he began his Annotations on the New Testament, which he finished in December 1690. The occasion of this undertaking was his disappointment with Poole's Synopsis, in the preparation of which he had assisted. The Annotations, in two large finely written folios, later passed to Thomas Jackson of the Wesleyan College, Richmond.

Among Robinson's versatile tastes was one for horses. He bred the best horses in the north of England, and, while staying with his brother Leonard in London, was summoned to Whitehall by Charles II for consultation respecting a charger which Monmouth afterwards rode at Bothwell-Brigg. He also began a book on horsemanship and the treatment of horses, but thought it "not honourable to his cloth to publish". Some of his "secrets" were embodied in the Gentleman's Jockey and Approved Farrier (1676).

=== Death and legacy ===
Robinson died at Ripley on 27 November 1694, and was buried in Burneston church. (Note: Whitaker, Richmondshire, ii. 130.) He left an estate of 700l. per annum, his skill in affairs being "next to miraculous". He married, on 12 October 1657, Jane, daughter of Mark Pickering of Ackworth, a descendant of Archbishop Tobie Matthew, but had no children. Their portraits, formerly at Burneston, have perished.

Thoresby mentions that A Treatise of Faith by a Dying Divine contains an account of Robinson's character. This, with a manuscript introduction in Robinson's writing, belonged in 1897 to J. R. Walbran, Esq., of Fallcroft, Ripon. The Life of Matthew Robinson was printed in 1856 by Professor Mayor in Part II of Cambridge in the Seventeenth Century, from a manuscript in St. John's College Library, with numerous notes, appendix, and indices. It purports to be, with the exception of the last four pages, an autobiography. It was completed by Robinson's nephew, George Grey. The latter's son, Zachary, supplied chronological notes and corrections.

== Bibliography ==
- Norgate, Gerald le Grys (1897). "Robinson, Matthew" . In Lee, Sidney (ed.). Dictionary of National Biography. Vol. 49. London: Smith, Elder & Co. pp. 33–34.
- Norgate, G. Le G.; Hopper, Andrew J. (2004). "Robinson, Matthew (bap. 1628, d. 1694)". In Oxford Dictionary of National Biography. Oxford: Oxford University Press.
- Page, William, ed. (1914). "Parishes: Burneston". In A History of the County of York North Riding. Vol. 1. London: Victoria County History, 1914. pp. 356–363
