= Nunwick =

Village in North Yorkshire, England

Coordinates: 54.1655°N 1.5083°W

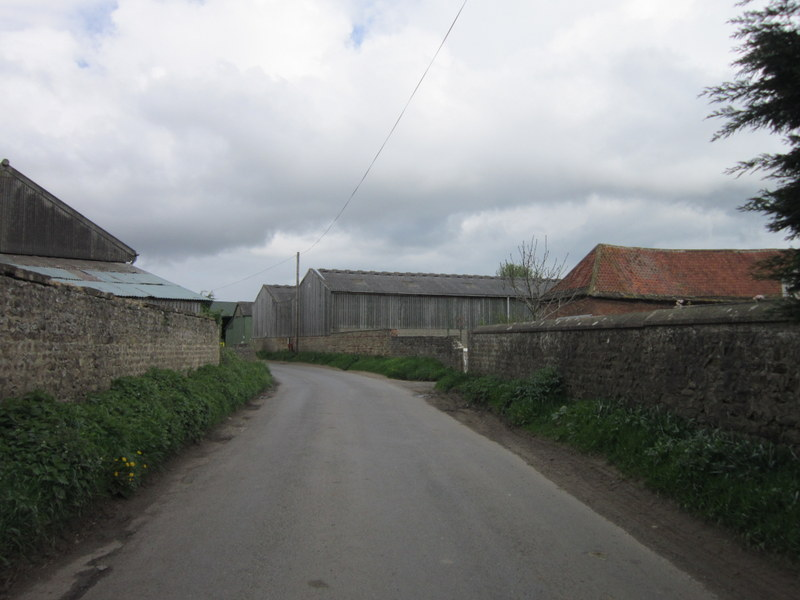
- Farm buildings

- Location within North Yorkshire
- OS grid reference: SE316753
- Civil parish: Hutton Conyers
- Unitary authority: North Yorkshire
- Ceremonial county: North Yorkshire
- Region: Yorkshire and the Humber
- Country: England
- Sovereign state: United Kingdom
- Post town: RIPON
- Postcode district: HG4
- Police: North Yorkshire
- Fire: North Yorkshire
- Ambulance: Yorkshire

Nunwick is a hamlet in the county of North Yorkshire, England. It is about 1 mile north-east of Ripon.

Nunwick was historically a township in the ancient parish of Ripon in the West Riding of Yorkshire. The township included two detached parts (a house and a farm) at Howgrave in the parish of Kirklington in the North Riding of Yorkshire. The township, with its detached parts, became the civil parish of Nunwick cum Howgrave in 1866. Later in the 19th century the detached parts in the North Riding were transferred to the civil parishes of Howgrave and Sutton with Howgrave, although the parish name remained Nunwick cum Howgrave.

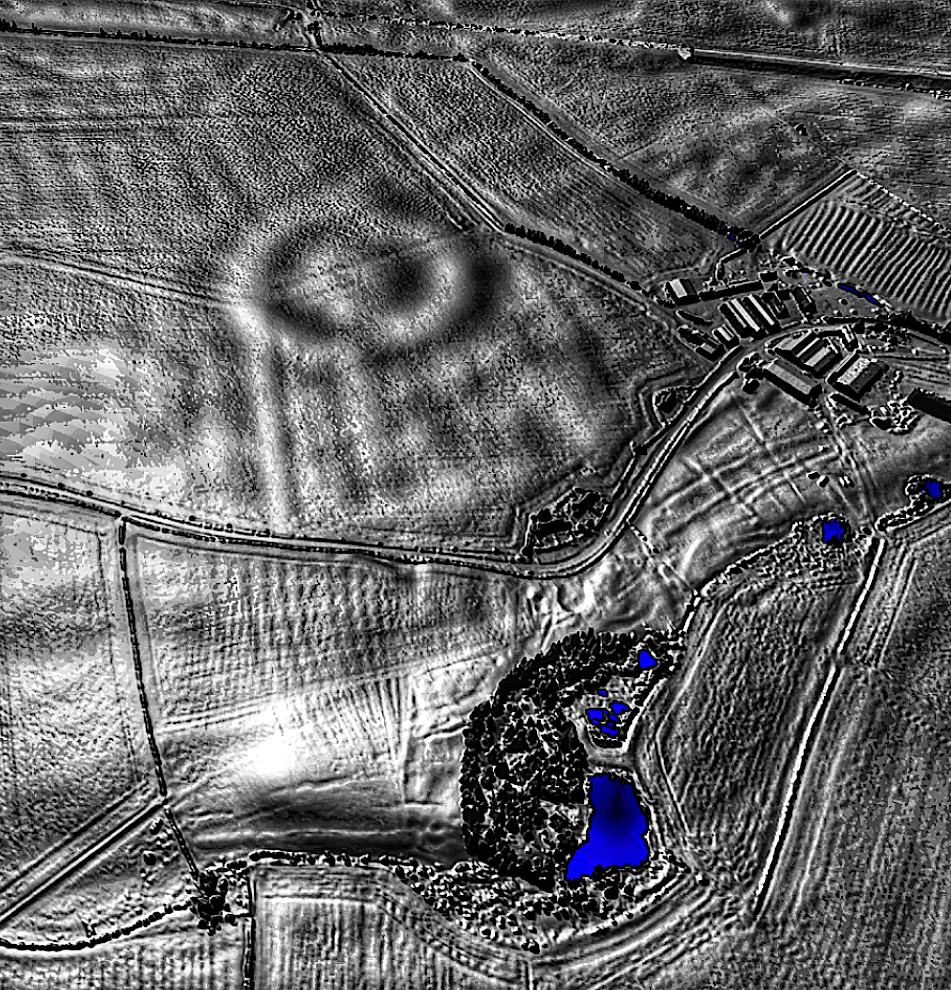
A lidar view of Nunwick's henge and deserted medieval settlement.

In 1974 the parish was transferred to the new county of North Yorkshire. The population of the parish was only 31 in 1961, and in 1988 it was absorbed into the civil parish of Hutton Conyers. From 1974 to 2023 it was part of the Borough of Harrogate and is now administered by the unitary North Yorkshire Council.
