= Swainby with Allerthorpe =

Civil parish in North Yorkshire, England

Coordinates: 54.2671°N 1.4851°W

- Civil parish
- Population: 20
- OS grid reference: SE335858
- Civil parish: Swainby with Allerthorpe
- Unitary authority: North Yorkshire
- Ceremonial county: North Yorkshire
- Region: Yorkshire and the Humber
- Country: England
- Sovereign state: United Kingdom
- Post town: BEDALE
- Postcode district: DL8
- Police: North Yorkshire
- Fire: North Yorkshire
- Ambulance: Yorkshire

Swainby with Allerthorpe is a civil parish in the county of North Yorkshire, England, 5 miles (8 km) south-west of Northallerton. The population of the civil parish was estimated at 20 in 2015. There is no modern village in the parish. The parish contains the remains of the deserted medieval village of Swainby.

The parish is on the west bank of the River Swale. In the early 20th century the parish was connected by a ferry with the village of Maunby on the east bank.

== History ==
Swainby was first recorded in Domesday Book of 1086, in the form Suanebi. The name means 'farm of the young men,' from the Old Norse sveinn. At the time of the Domesday Survey the manor was held by Count Alan of Brittany and the tenant was Ribald, Lord of Middleham. In about 1188 Ribald's descendant Helewise granted land at Swainby for a new monastery, but in 1214-16 Helewise's son moved the monks to refound the abbey at Coverham. Both the remaining traces of Swainby Abbey and the remains of the deserted village are now listed as a scheduled monument.

=== Allerthorpe ===
Allerthorpe is located in the north of the civil parish. It now comprises only the manor house, Allerthorpe Hall, built in 1608 and now a Grade I listed building. Allerthorpe was also first recorded in Domesday Book, in the form (H)erleuestorp. The name is Old Norse and means "village of a man named Herlef".

== Governance ==
The parish was historically a township in the parish of Pickhill in the wapentake of Hallikeld in the North Riding of Yorkshire. It became a separate civil parish in 1866. It was transferred to the new county of North Yorkshire in 1974. From 1974 to 2023 the parish was part of the Hambleton District. It is now administered by the unitary North Yorkshire Council. It shares a grouped parish council with the civil parishes of Burneston and Theakston.
