= Listed buildings in Swainby with Allerthorpe =

Swainby with Allerthorpe is a civil parish in the county of North Yorkshire, England. It contains two listed buildings that are recorded in the National Heritage List for England, both of which are listed at Grade I, the highest of the three grades. The parish does not contain any settlements, and the listed buildings consist of a manor house and its gate piers.

== Key ==
Grade	Criteria
I	Buildings of exceptional interest, sometimes considered to be internationally important

== Buildings ==
Name and location	Photograph	Date	Notes	Grade
Allerthorpe Hall; 54.27552°N 1.49449°W	—	1608	A manor house in red brick on a shallow stone plinth, with stone dressings, and roofs in tile and pantile. There are two storeys and six bays, the outer bays being circular towers with comical roofs, and the four inner bays with dentilled eaves and a hipped roof. In the centre is a full height gabled porch with stone coping and shaped kneelers. The outer entrance has a four-centred arch, and the inner doorway has a carved surround including the date. The windows in the outer bays are casements, and elsewhere is a mix of windows, some mullioned, and others sashes, some horizontally sliding. On the upper floor of the left return is timber framing with lath and plaster infill.	I
Gate piers, Allerthorpe Hall; 54.27538°N 1.49440°W	—	Early 17th century	The gate piers in front of the house are in rusticated stone and have a square plan. Each pier has a plinth, the inner face has a rusticated pilaster with a moulded cornice and a bracket. The entablature has a moulded band at the base, a frieze with panels, a large moulded cornice and blocking course, and a large cushion and ball finial.	I
