= Milby, North Yorkshire =

Hamlet and civil parish in North Yorkshire, England

Coordinates: 54.104790°N 1.385620°W

Milby
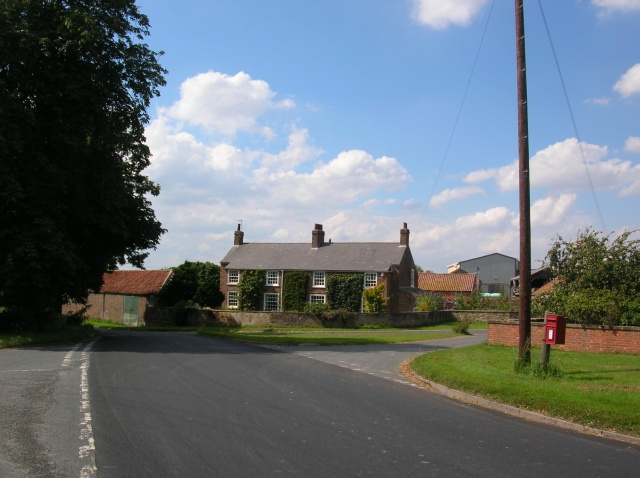

- Location within North Yorkshire
- Population: 184 (2011 census)
- OS grid reference: SE402678
- Civil parish: Milby
- Unitary authority: North Yorkshire
- Ceremonial county: North Yorkshire
- Region: Yorkshire and the Humber
- Country: England
- Sovereign state: United Kingdom
- Post town: YORK
- Postcode district: YO51
- Police: North Yorkshire
- Fire: North Yorkshire
- Ambulance: Yorkshire
- UK Parliament: Skipton and Ripon (UK Parliament constituency)

Milby is a hamlet and civil parish in North Yorkshire, England. It is situated to the immediate north of Boroughbridge.

== History ==
The Roman road, Dere Street crossed the River Ure at Milby. Until the mid 19th century, the old wooden bridge remains could still be seen.

The village is mentioned in the Domesday Book as Mildebi in the Hallikeld Wapentake. The lands were the possession of the Crown both before and after the Norman invasion.

Milby was historically a township in the North Riding of Yorkshire, divided between the parishes of Aldborough and Kirby Hill. It became a separate civil parish in 1866. In 1974 Milby was transferred from the North Riding to the new county of North Yorkshire. From 1974 to 2023 it was part of the Hambleton District, it is now administered by the unitary North Yorkshire Council.

The Pilmoor, Boroughbridge and Knaresborough Railway, a branch line of the North Eastern railway, ran through the parish. The line ran from Pilmoor Junction on the East Coast Main Line near Easingwold to Knaresborough via Boroughbridge. Opened in 1847, it closed in 1964. The Old Station House is a Grade II Listed Building.

== Governance ==
The village lies within the Skipton and Ripon UK Parliament constituency. The local Parish Council has nine members.

== Geography ==
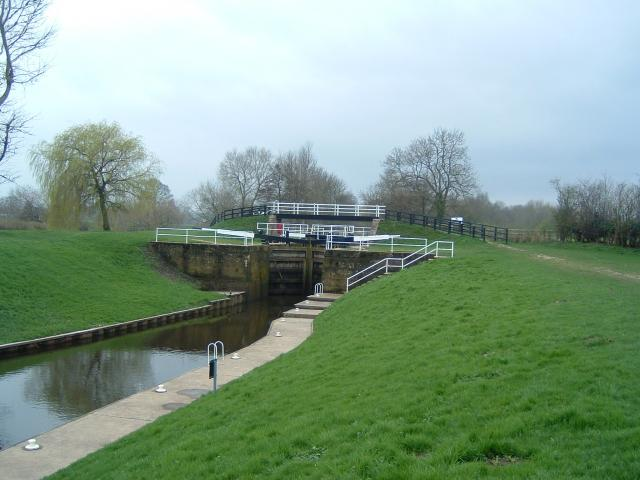
Milby Lock on the River Ure

The nearest settlements are Boroughbridge 0.8 miles (1.3 km) to the south; Langthorpe 0.8 miles (1.3 km) to the south-west; and Kirby Hill 0.9 miles (1.4 km) to the north-west.

The village lies on the north bank of the River Ure. In order to make the river navigable past the weir at Boroughbridge, a three-quarter mile cut was made from Milby, including a set of locks, to Langthorpe.

The 2001 UK Census recorded the population as 162 of which 123 were over the age of sixteen years and 105 of those were in employment. There were 62 dwellings of which 40 were detached. The 2011 Census gave the population as 184.
