= Listed buildings in Kirklington-cum-Upsland =

Kirklington-cum-Upsland is a civil parish in the county of North Yorkshire, England. It contains eleven listed buildings that are recorded in the National Heritage List for England. Of these, one is listed at Grade I, the highest of the three grades, one is at Grade II*, the middle grade, and the others are at Grade II, the lowest grade. The parish contains the village of Kirklington and the surrounding area. All the listed buildings are in the village, and consist of houses, cottages, and associated structures, a church and a telephone kiosk.

== Key ==
Grade	Criteria
I	Buildings of exceptional interest, sometimes considered to be internationally important
II*	Particularly important buildings of more than special interest
II	Buildings of national importance and special interest

== Buildings ==
Name and location	Photograph	Date	Notes	Grade
St Michael's Church; 54.22411°N 1.51278°W		Early 13th century	The church has been altered and extended through the centuries, including a restoration and additions by G. Fowler Jones in 1857–58. The church is built in stone with Welsh slate roofs, and consists of a nave with a clerestory, north and south aisles, north and south porches, a chancel with a north and south vestry, and a west tower. The tower has three stages, diagonal buttresses, a full-height stair tower in the south corner, a three-light west window with a hood mould, a clock face on the north side, two-light bell openings, and an embattled parapet with crocketed corner pinnacles. On the east gable of the nave is a bell turret.	I
The Hall; 54.22662°N 1.51781°W		c. 1572	A large house in stone and brick, partly rendered, with a Welsh slate roof. It is partly in two storeys with attics, and partly in three storeys. The east front has six bays, the west front has a central embattled range and flanking gabled cross-wings, and there is a two-storey wing to the north. Features include coped pedimented gables and finials, quoins, and doorways with four-centred arched heads. The windows are a mix, and include sashes, some horizontally-sliding, and mullioned windows, some also with transoms.	II*
Gate piers, The Hall; 54.22616°N 1.51714°W	—	Early 18th century	The gate piers flanking the entrance to the drive are in rusticated stone and have a square plan. Each pier has moulded bands, a frieze, a cornice and a blocking course. On the front and the rear is a brick pilaster, and on the inner face is a narrow stone pilaster, with a scroll bracketed top.	II
The Old Rectory; 54.22479°N 1.51316°W	—	Early 18th century	The house is rendered, and has a hipped Welsh slate roof. There are two storeys and five bays. The central doorway has pilasters, a fanlight, a cornice and side lights. To its right is a full-height canted bay window. Also on the front are French windows and sash windows.	II
The Old Academy; 54.22536°N 1.51197°W		Mid to late 18th century	The house is in red brick, with a floor band, dentilled eaves, and a pantile roof with brick coping on the left. There are two storeys and two bays. The central doorway has a moulded stone architrave, and the windows are sashes with flat brick arches.	II
Goldswang Farmhouse; 54.22552°N 1.51220°W	—	Late 18th century	The farmhouse is in rendered red brick with a pantile roof. There are two storeys, a double depth plan, and three bays. On the front is a gabled porch and a doorway with pilasters and a fanlight, and the windows are sashes.	II
The Villa; 54.22571°N 1.51243°W		Late 18th century	The house is in rendered red brick, with a floor band and a Welsh slate roof. There are two storeys and three bays. The doorway has pilasters, a fanlight, a frieze, consoles and a cornice, and the windows are sashes with stuccoed flat arches.	II
Lime Tree Cottages; 54.22636°N 1.51287°W	—	Early 19th century	A pair of cottages in red brick, with a timber eaves board, and a Welsh slate roof with stone coping and shaped kneelers. There are two storeys and each cottage has two bays. The central doorways have pilasters, a frieze and a cornice, and the windows are sashes with flat brick arches.	II
Rose Cottage; 54.22399°N 1.51193°W	—	Early 19th century	The cottage is in red brick with a pantile roof. There are two storeys and two bays. The central doorway has a flat brick arch, and the windows are horizontally-sliding sashes with segmental brick arches.	II
The Post Office; 54.22526°N 1.51193°W		Early 19th century	The house, at one time a house and a shop, is in stone, with quoins, and a pantile roof with a shaped kneeler and stone coping on the right. In the middle bay is a doorway, and the windows are sashes.	II
Telephone kiosk 54.22644°N 1.51312°W		1935	The K6 type telephone kiosk on The Green was designed by Giles Gilbert Scott. Constructed in cast iron with a square plan and a dome, it has three unperforated crowns in the top panels.	II
