= Langthorpe =

Village and civil parish in North Yorkshire, England

Coordinates: 54.10122°N 1.40419°W

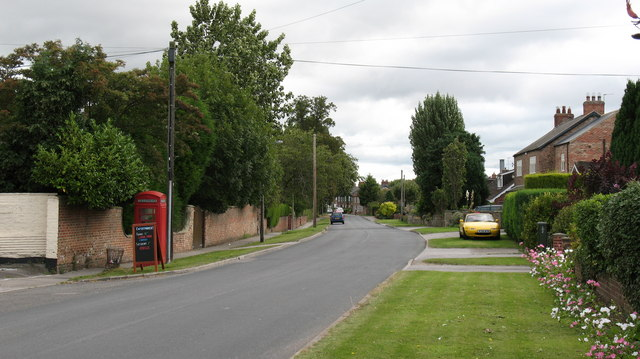
- Skelton Road, Langthorpe

- Location within North Yorkshire
- Population: 812 (2011 Census)
- OS grid reference: SE390674
- Civil parish: Langthorpe
- Unitary authority: North Yorkshire
- Ceremonial county: North Yorkshire
- Region: Yorkshire and the Humber
- Country: England
- Sovereign state: United Kingdom
- Post town: YORK
- Postcode district: YO51
- Police: North Yorkshire
- Fire: North Yorkshire
- Ambulance: Yorkshire
- UK Parliament: Wetherby and Easingwold (UK Parliament constituency)

Langthorpe is a village and civil parish in the county of North Yorkshire, England. The population of the civil parish taken at the 2011 Census was 812. It is situated to the immediate north of Boroughbridge on the A168 road.

== History ==
The village is mentioned in the Domesday Book as Torp in the Hallikeld hundred. The lands were the possession of Gospatric, son of Arnketil both before and after the Norman invasion.

There was a brewery, Warwick's Anchor Brewery, in the village, but now disused.

== Governance ==
The village lies within the Wetherby and Easingwold UK Parliament constituency. From 1974 to 2023 it was part of the Borough of Harrogate. It is now administered by the unitary North Yorkshire Council.

== Geography ==
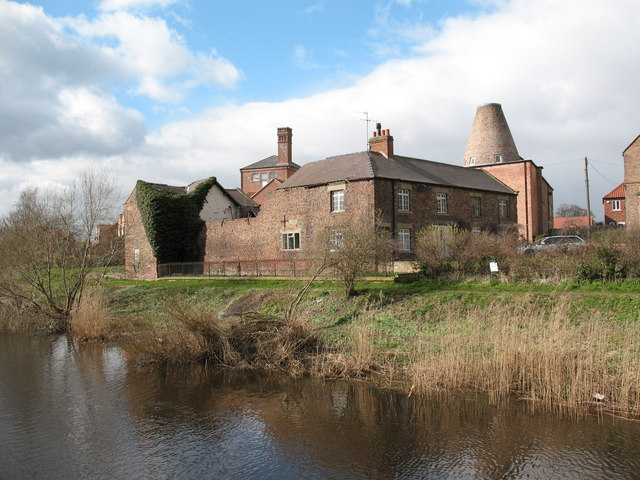
The old brewery at Langthorpe, beside the River Ure, now converted into housing

The nearest settlements are Boroughbridge 0.5 miles (0.8 km) to the south; Milby 0.8 miles (1.3 km) to the north-east; Kirby-on-the-Moor 0.7 miles (1.1 km) to the north and Skelton-on-Ure 1.9 miles (3.1 km) to the west.

The 2001 UK Census recorded the parish population as 774 of which 638 are over sixteen years old and 412 of those were in employment. There were 327 dwellings of which 122 were detached.

== See also ==
- Listed buildings in Langthorpe
