= Listed buildings in Burneston =

Burneston is a civil parish in the county of North Yorkshire, England. It contains eleven listed buildings that are recorded in the National Heritage List for England. Of these, one is listed at Grade I, the highest of the three grades, one is at Grade II*, the middle grade, and the others are at Grade II, the lowest grade. The parish contains the village of Burneston and the surrounding countryside. Most of the listed buildings are in the village, and consist of a church, a war memorial and a tombstone in the churchyard, the walls and gateways of the churchyard, houses, former almshouses, and a telephone kiosk. Outside the village are a farmhouse with outbuildings, and a bridge.

== Key ==
Grade	Criteria
I	Buildings of exceptional interest, sometimes considered to be internationally important
II*	Particularly important buildings of more than special interest
II	Buildings of national importance and special interest

== Buildings ==
Name and location	Photograph	Date	Notes	Grade
St Lambert's Church; 54.25925°N 1.52774°W		15th century	The church has been altered and extended through the centuries, including a restoration in 1853. It is built in stone with slate roofs, and is in Perpendicular style. The church consists of a nave with a clerestory, north and south aisles, a south porch, a chancel with a north vestry, and a west steeple. The steeple has a tower with three stages, diagonal buttresses with gargoyles at the top, some containing niches, a south stair tower, a west window with a pointed arch, a clock face, two-light elliptical-arched bell openings, a chamfered band, a plain parapet with corner pinnacles and finials, and a recessed splay-footed spire. There are embattled parapets with crocketed pinnacles on the nave and the aisles.	I
Gateways and wall, St Lambert's Church; 54.25930°N 1.52810°W		Late 15th century	The wall encloses the churchyard mainly to the north and west. It is in stone, and contains two moulded pointed arched gateways, with gables, buttresses, stone coping and crosses. The wall is about 1.5 metres (4 ft 11 in) high, and has chamfered coping.	II
The Almshouses; 54.25939°N 1.52866°W		1680	The almshouses, later cottages, with a schoolroom at the east end, are in stone and red brick on a coped stone plinth, with stone dressings, quoins, and a Welsh slate roof with stone copings and shaped kneelers. There are two storeys and seven bays. The two doorways have quoined surrounds and four-centred arched lintels, and above each is a tablet with a moulded surround, one with an inscription and the date, and the other with a coat of arms, over which is an elliptical window in a square surround. The other windows are mullioned and contain casements. Over the ground floor windows are segmental or triangular pediments, and to the right is a stone sundial with an inscription. In the gable ends are windows with four circular lights in a square surround.	II*
Burneston Hall; 54.25993°N 1.52709°W	—	Early 18th century	The house is in stone and rendered brick, on a stone plinth, with stone dressings, floor and eaves bands, and a hipped Welsh slate roof. There are five bays, the third and fourth bays projecting with three storeys, and the other bays with two storeys. On the right return is a Doric portico, and the windows are sashes with flat arches and incised voussoirs.	II
Tombstone; 54.25899°N 1.52780°W	—	1739	The tombstone in the churchyard of St Lambert's Church is to the southwest of the church and to the memory of Francis Rund. It is in stone, and consists of a slab with a moulded architrave and a shaped top, and it contains an inscription.	II
Lane House; 54.26002°N 1.52849°W		Mid 18th century	A red brick house with floor bands, stepped eaves, and a Welsh slate roof with stone coping. There are two storeys, a double-range plan, and three bays. The doorway has a moulded surround, and a fanlight with a mullion, and the windows are sashes with flat brick arches.	II
Oak Tree Farmhouse and outbuildings 54.25658°N 1.51372°W		Mid to late 18th century	The farmhouse is in brick, partly rendered, with dentilled eaves, and a Welsh slate roof with stone coping and shaped kneelers. There are two storeys, a double-depth plan and four bays. The doorway has Doric half-columns, a frieze, a cornice and a blocking course, and the windows are sashes. To the right is a long range of outbuildings in rendered brick with pantile roofs and a single storey. They contain two sets of double doors and five square openings.	II
Healam Bridge; 54.24809°N 1.50594°W		Late 18th century	The bridge carries a disused road over Holme Beck. It is in stone, and consists of a single segmental arch. The bridge has voussoirs, a band and a coped parapet, and is flanked by pilasters.	II
Hargill House; 54.25947°N 1.52528°W		1824	The house, to which a wing was added later in the 19th century, is in red brick, with dentilled eaves, and a Welsh slate roof with a shaped kneeler and a coped gable on the left. There are two storeys and four bays, the right bay being a projecting gabled cross-wing, and a rear wing. The doorway has a fanlight with radial glazing bars, plain consoles and a pediment. This is flanked by small round-arched windows, the other windows on the front are sashes, and at the rear is a round-arched stair window.	II
War memorial 54.25925°N 1.52802°W		c. 1920	The war memorial is in the churchyard of St Lambert's Church to the north of the tower. It is in stone, and consists of an ornate wheel-head cross with a central rose motif and a foliate design on each arm of the cross. It has a square shaft on a trapezoid plinth on a single-stepped base. On the front of the plinth is an inscription and the names of those lost in the First World War, and the names of those lost in the Second World War are on the side of the plinth.	II
Telephone kiosk 54.25937°N 1.52847°W		1935	The K6 type telephone kiosk adjacent to The Almshouses was designed by Giles Gilbert Scott. Constructed in cast iron with a square plan and a dome, it has three unperforated crowns in the top panels.	II
