= Listed buildings in Langthorpe =

Langthorpe is a civil parish in the county of North Yorkshire, England. It contains five listed buildings that are recorded in the National Heritage List for England. All the listed buildings are designated at Grade II, the lowest of the three grades, which is applied to "buildings of national importance and special interest". The parish contains the village of Langthorpe and the surrounding area. Three of the listed buildings are associated with a former brewery, and the others consist of a house and a bridge.

== Buildings ==
Name and location	Photograph	Date	Notes
Borough Bridge; 54.09745°N 1.39542°W		1562	The bridge carries the B6265 road over the River Ure, and was largely rebuilt and widened in 1785 by John Carr. It is in sandstone, and consists of three segmental arches. The cutwaters on the east side are pointed, and on the west side they are semicircular. The parapets over the cutwaters are carried up as buttresses, they continue to the north, and end in square terminals.
Anchor Marine Stores; 54.09897°N 1.39992°W		c. 1850	A maltings and kiln, later used for other purposes, in red-brown brick with a grey slate roof. There is a main range of three storeys and a basement, and three bays, and a two-storey kiln at the southeast end. The kiln has a conical flue.
Langthorpe Villa; 54.09979°N 1.40629°W	—	Mid 19th century	The house is in red brick with a moulded eaves cornice and a hipped Welsh slate roof. There are two storeys and three bays. The central doorway has attached Ionic columns, an entablature and a deep cornice. The windows are sashes with wedge lintels.
Laundry building, Warwick's Anchor Brewery; 54.09896°N 1.40080°W		1856	A brewery building later used for other purposes, it is in red-brown brick with a corrugated asbestos roof. There are four storeys and five bays, the rear range reduced to two storeys. The doorways and windows have cambered heads, and in the rear range is a datestone.
Maltings and kilns, Warwick's Anchor Brewery; 54.09944°N 1.40131°W		Mid to late 19th century	The former maltings and kilns are in red-brown brick with a grey slate roof. The maltings has three storeys, and fronts of seven and three bays, and at the east end is a pair of slightly taller three-bay kilns. The building contains doorways, and the other openings are either blocked or contain casement windows. The main block has skylights and ridge louvres, and the kilns have pyramidal roofs and flat-topped flues.
