= Listed buildings in East Tanfield =

East Tanfield is a civil parish in the county of North Yorkshire, England. It contains two listed buildings that are recorded in the National Heritage List for England. Both the listed buildings are designated at Grade II, the lowest of the three grades, which is applied to "buildings of national importance and special interest". The parish does not contain any significant settlement, and both the listed buildings are farmhouses.

== Buildings ==
Name and location	Photograph	Date	Notes
Chapel Hill Farmhouse; 54.20875°N 1.55279°W	—	Early 19th century	The farmhouse is rendered, with painted stone dressings and a stone slate roof. There are two storeys and three bays. The central doorway has a fanlight, the windows are sashes, and all the openings have flat arches with incised voussoirs.
Manor Farmhouse; 54.19562°N 1.55694°W	—	Early 19th century	The farmhouse is in rendered stone, and has a slate roof with shaped kneelers and stone coping. There are two storeys, three bays and a rear wing. The central doorway has a fanlight with decorative glazing bars, to its right is a bow window, the other windows on the front are sashes, and at the rear is a round-headed stair window.
