= Listed buildings in Kirby Hill, Harrogate =

Kirby Hill is a civil parish in the county of North Yorkshire, England. It contains four listed buildings that are recorded in the National Heritage List for England. Of these, one is listed at Grade I, the highest of the three grades, and the others are at Grade II, the lowest grade. The parish contains the village of Kirby-on-the-Moor and the surrounding area, and the listed buildings consist of a church, a house, a milestone, and a vicarage and associated structures.

== Key ==
Grade	Criteria
I	Buildings of exceptional interest, sometimes considered to be internationally important
II	Buildings of national importance and special interest

== Buildings ==
Name and location	Photograph	Date	Notes	Grade
All Saints' Church; 54.11176°N 1.39999°W		c. 800	The church has been altered and extended through the centuries, particularly by George Gilbert Scott in 1870. It is built in gritstone with roofs of stone slate and tile, and consists of a nave, a taller north aisle and chapel, a south porch, a lower chancel and a west tower. The tower has three stages, a two-light west window, paired lancet bell openings, a corbel table with a gargoyle on the west, a coped parapet, and a squat pyramidal slate roof with a weathercock. In the porch are worked stones, including one from the Saxon period, and the inner doorway has a round arch.	I
Pond House; 54.10991°N 1.40545°W	—	c. 1750	The house is in red brick with a lintel band and a Welsh slate roof. There are two storeys, three bays, a rear outshut and a service wing. The central doorway has a fanlight, and the upper floor windows have cambered header-brick arches.	II
Milestone; 54.10939°N 1.40697°W		Early 19th century	The milestone is on the west side of Leeming Lane (B6265 road), it is in gritstone, square and about 1.75 metres (5 ft 9 in) high. The rear is semicircular. and on the front are two straight sides. The left side is inscribed with the distances to Catterick, Piersbridge and Greta Bridge, and on the right side to Boroughbridge and London.	II
Vicarage, carriage house, stable and outbuildings 54.11021°N 1.40218°W	—	1839	The vicarage is in red brick, with a sill band, a moulded eaves cornice, and a hipped grey slate roof. There are two storeys and three bays. The central doorway has attached columns, a fanlight, a plain entablature and a cornice. The windows are sashes with gauged brick arches. The courtyard to the right contains a carriage house with two storeys, two bays and a single-storey bay on the left, a stable, and a range of three outbuildings.	II
