= Kirklington-cum-Upsland =

Civil parish in North Yorkshire, England

Coordinates: 54.226°N 1.513°W

- Civil parish

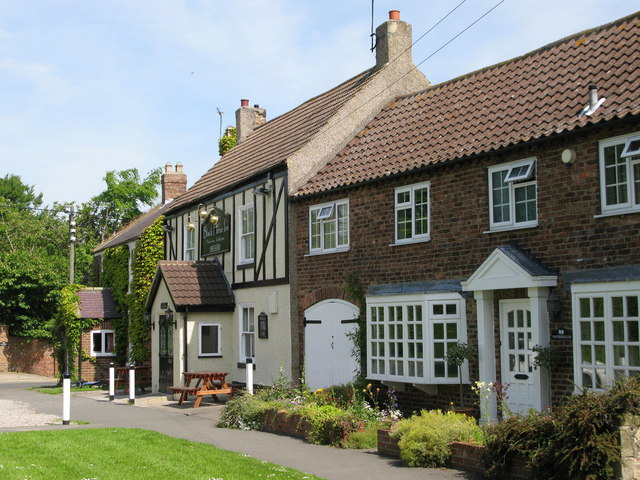
- Kirklington
- Population: 220 (2014)
- OS grid reference: SE317812
- Civil parish: Kirklington-cum-Upsland
- Unitary authority: North Yorkshire
- Ceremonial county: North Yorkshire
- Region: Yorkshire and the Humber
- Country: England
- Sovereign state: United Kingdom
- Post town: BEDALE, HAWES, LEYBURN
- Postcode district: DL8
- Police: North Yorkshire
- Fire: North Yorkshire
- Ambulance: Yorkshire

Kirklington-cum-Upsland is a civil parish in North Yorkshire, England. The main settlement is Kirklington. Upsland is a single farm in the south-west of the parish.

Kirklington cum Upsland was historically a township in the ancient parish of Kirklington in the North Riding of Yorkshire. It became a separate civil parish in 1866. From 1894 it formed an urban district, but in 1934 the urban district was abolished and merged with Bedale Rural District. In 1974 the parish was transferred to the Hambleton District in the new county of North Yorkshire. Since 1978 it has shared a grouped parish council, Kirklington with Sutton Howgrave, with the parishes of Howgrave and Sutton with Howgrave. In 2023 Hambleton District was abolished, it is now administered by the unitary North Yorkshire Council.

== See also ==
- Listed buildings in Kirklington-cum-Upsland
