= Anchor Brewery, Langthorpe =

Brewery in Langthorpe, North Yorkshire, England

Coordinates: 54°05′58″N 1°24′05″W

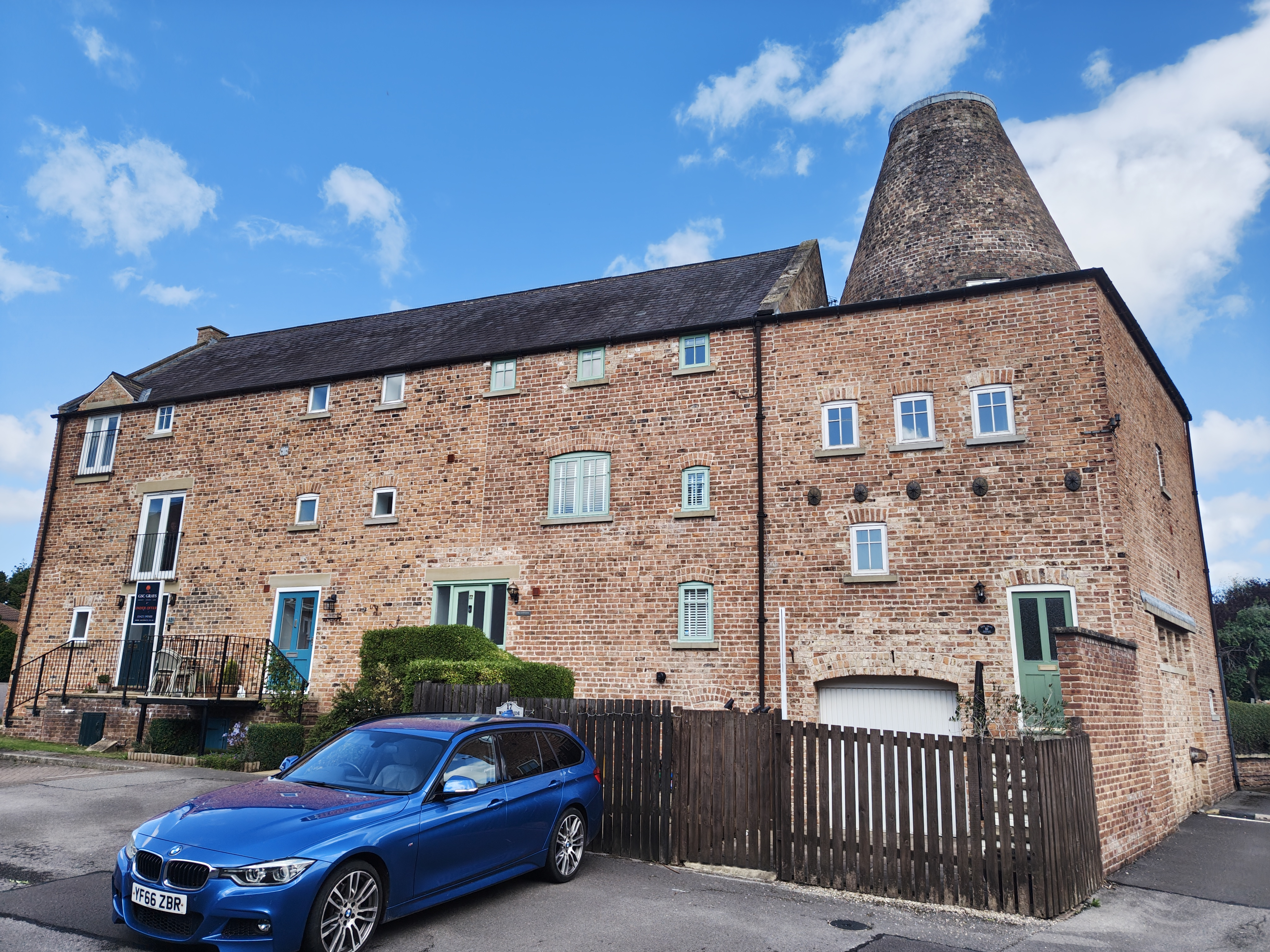
The old maltings, in 2025

The Anchor Brewery is a historic industrial site in Langthorpe, a village in North Yorkshire, in England.

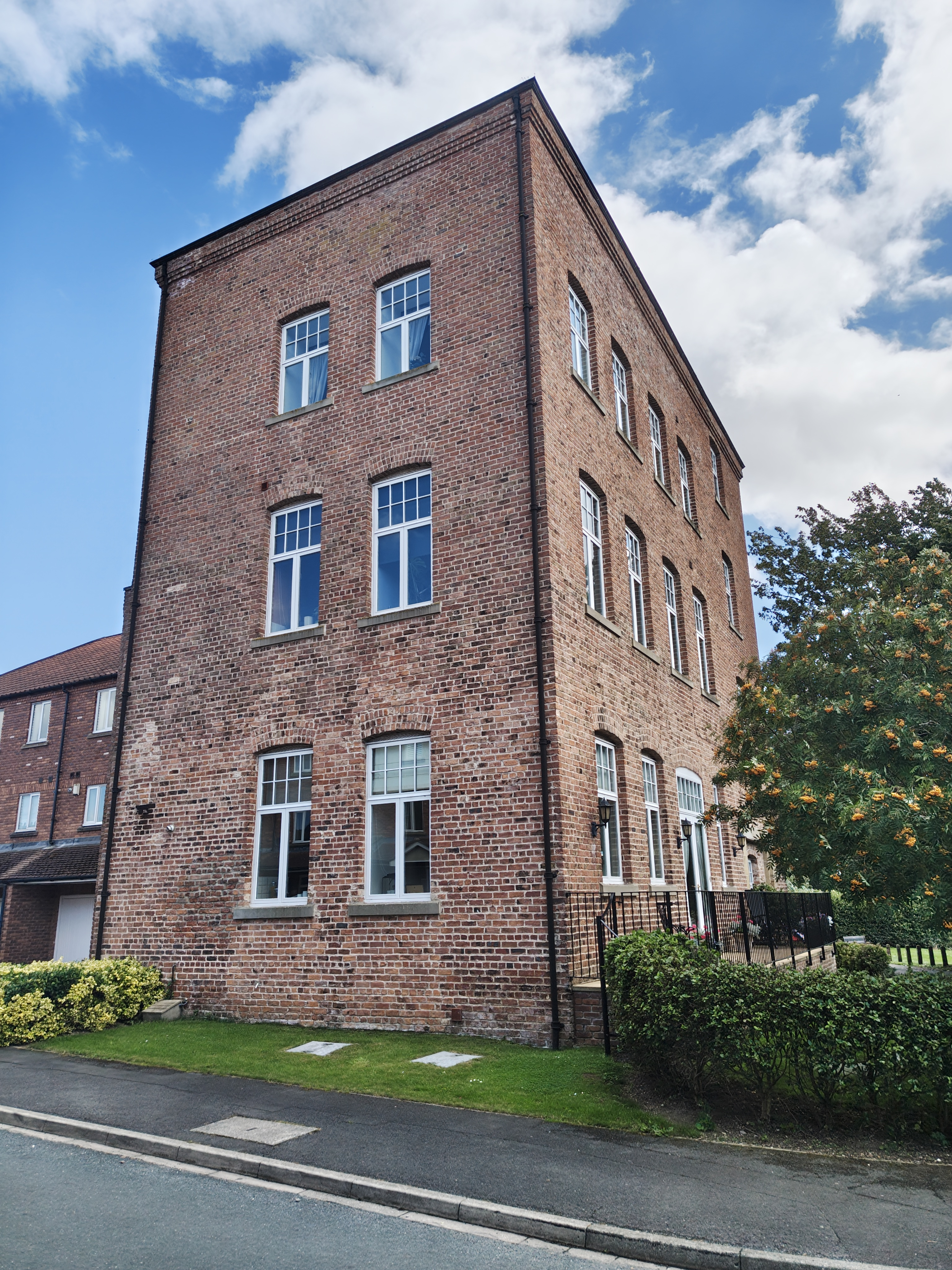
The former laundry

Warwick's Anchor Brewery was constructed in the mid 19th century, with the maltings of about 1850 being the oldest surviving building, and probably the oldest surviving maltings in the country. The main building was reconstructed in 1856, as a four-storey tower brewery, although part was later reduced to two storeys. A new, larger, maltings was added in 1875. In 1924, Warwick's was purchased by John Smith's Brewery, which closed the site in 1964. The old maltings was converted into a shop and offices, and the main building into a laundry. Each of the brewery buildings was grade II listed in 1987. Some of the brewery buildings were converted into housing in 2007.

The old maltings and kiln is built of red-brown brick with a grey slate roof. There is a main range of three storeys and a basement, and three bays, and a two-storey kiln at the southeast end. The kiln has a conical flue. The main building is also built of red-brown brick with a corrugated asbestos roof. There are four storeys and five bays, the rear range reduced to two storeys. The doorways and windows have cambered heads, and in the rear range is a datestone.

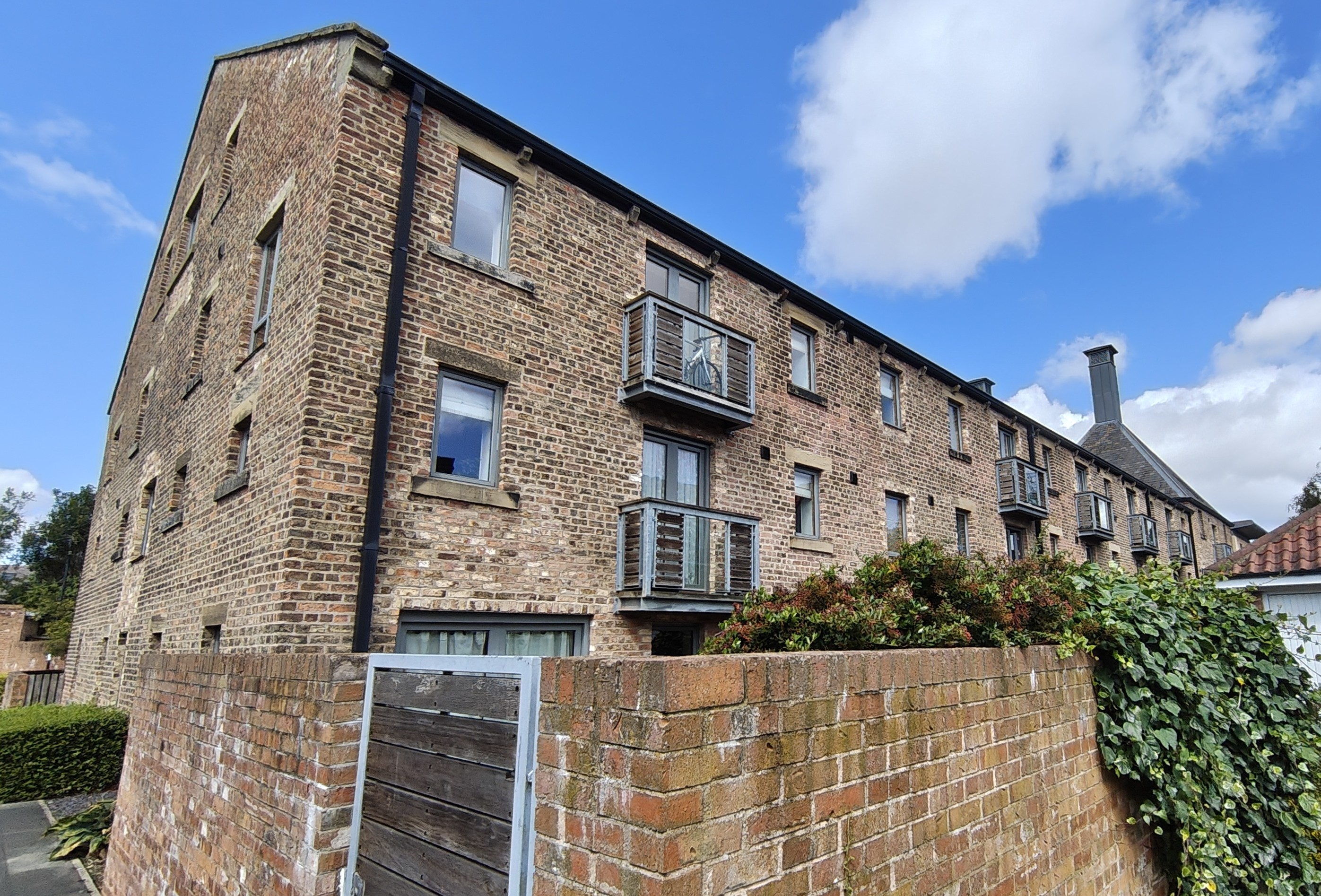
The new maltings

The newer maltings and kilns are similarly built of red-brown brick and have a grey slate roof. The maltings has three storeys, and fronts of seven and three bays, and at the east end is a pair of slightly taller three-bay kilns. The building contains doorways, and the other openings are either blocked or contain casement windows. The main block has skylights and ridge louvres, and the kilns have pyramidal roofs and flat-topped flues.

== See also ==
- Listed buildings in Langthorpe
