= All Saints' Church, Kirby-on-the-Moor =

Church in North Yorkshire, England

Coordinates: 54°06′42″N 1°24′00″W

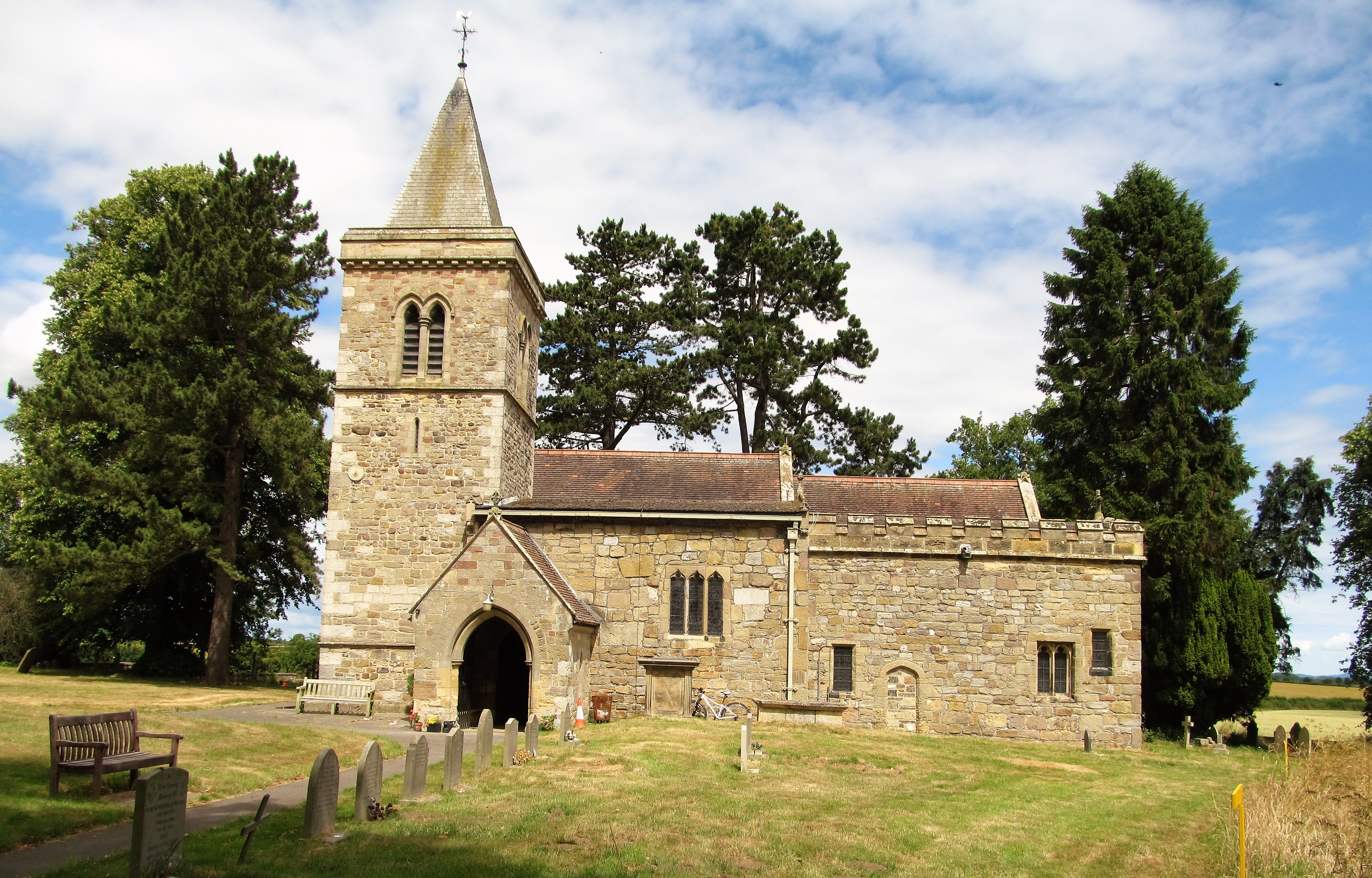
The church, in 2018

All Saints' Church is the parish church of Kirby-on-the-Moor, a village in North Yorkshire, in England.

The church was probably built in the 10th century, but uses even earlier materials. The north aisle was added in about 1170, followed by the chancel around 1200, and the north chapel later in the century. The chapel was enlarged in the 15th century, and the whole church was restored by George Gilbert Scott in 1870, who added the south porch. The building was grade I listed in 1966.

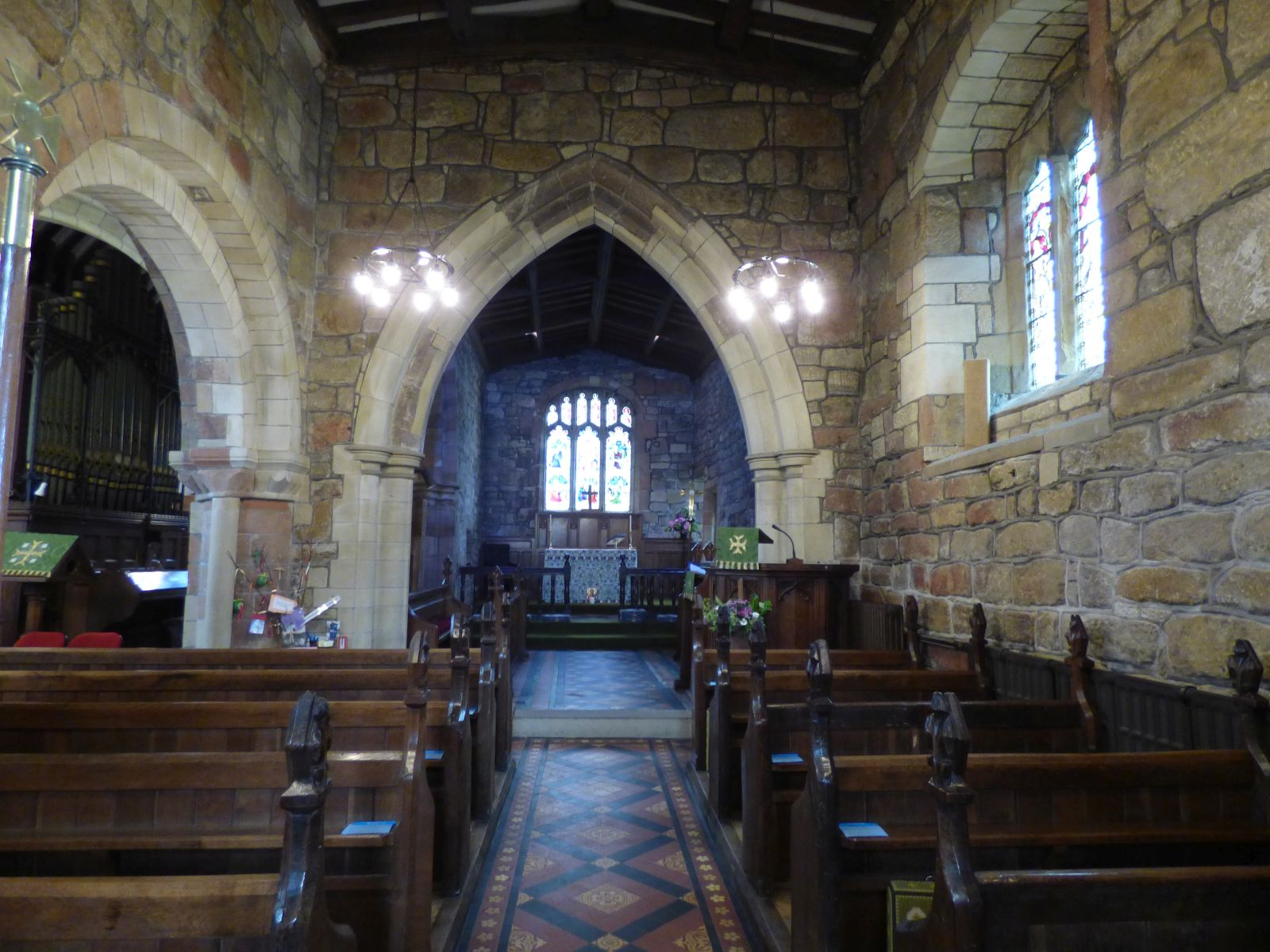
View from the nave into the chancel

The church is built of gritstone with roofs of stone slate and tile, and consists of a nave, a taller north aisle and chapel, a south porch, a lower chancel and a west tower. The tower has three stages, a two-light west window, paired lancet bell openings, a corbel table with a gargoyle on the west, a coped parapet, and a squat pyramidal slate roof with a weathercock. In the porch are worked stones, including one from the Saxon period, and the inner doorway has a round arch. Inside, the chapel has a squint to the chancel. The font is 11th century, reworked in the 14th century, with an 18th-century cover, and some of the bench ends date from the 15th century.

In and around the church are 12 stones with Celtic carvings. At the base of the southwest corner of the church is a large granite block with a Roman inscription. It is too weathered to be legible, but it appears to be a dedication to either Antoninus Pius or Caracalla, which would make it second- or early third-century.

The west tower has a ring of six bells. Richard Seliok of Nottingham cast the tenor bell in about 1520. Samuel II Smith of York cast the fourth bell in 1713 and the fifth bell in 1718. John Warner & Sons of Cripplegate, London cast the treble, second and third bells in 1869.

== See also ==
- Grade I listed buildings in North Yorkshire (district)
- Listed buildings in Kirby Hill, Harrogate
