= Camp Hill House =

Listed building in North Yorkshire, England

Coordinates: 54°14′14″N 1°31′24″W

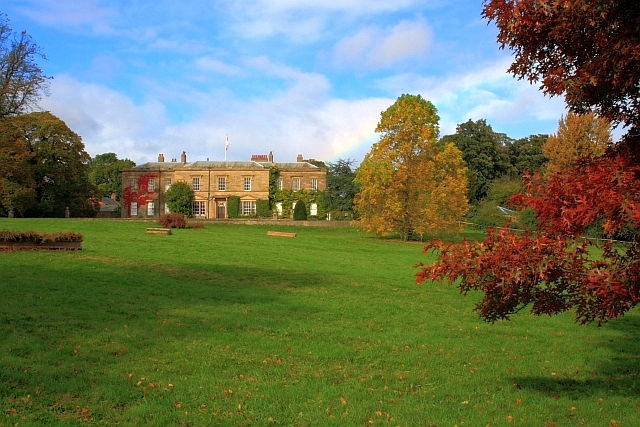
The house, in 2008

Camp Hill House is a historic building in Carthorpe, a village in North Yorkshire, in England.

A country house on the site was first recorded in 1741, when it was known as "Badger Hall". At the time, the land was owned by James Hoyland, head gardener at Castle Howard, and he may have been responsible for designing the grounds. In the 1790s, it was renamed "Camp Hill", and in 1799 it was purchased by William Rookes Leeds Serjeantson. He had the house rebuilt in about 1820, at a cost of £12,000. It was Grade II listed in 1998. The grounds are now used for glamping.

The house is built of stone, with brick at the rear, a sill band, a moulded cornice and a blocking course, and a hipped slate roof. It has two storeys, nine bays, and a rear wing. The middle three bays project, and contain a Doric porch with two columns, two pilasters, dosserets without a frieze, and a cornice, and a double doorway with a moulded architrave, and a fanlight with radial glazing bars. The windows are sashes, most of those in the ground floor with moulded architraves, and those in the upper floor with cornices on consoles. Inside, there is a cantilevered open-well stone staircase, with an oval lantern. The dining room is panelled, while plasterwork cornices and mahogany doors survive in many rooms.

The house is atop a small hill, surrounded by 40 hectares of garden and parkland, and an additional 100 hectares of woodland. The gardens probably date from 1820, and there are two walled gardens to the north of the hall. South of the main building is an ice house, which is also grade II listed. It is built of red brick, and largely covered in earth. It has a circular plan with a brick barrel vaulted entrance passage. Three steps lead down to a circular chamber 8 feet (2.4 m) deep, with a domed roof.

== See also ==
- Listed buildings in Carthorpe
