= Allerthorpe Hall =

Building in North Yorkshire, England

Coordinates: 54°16′32″N 1°29′40″W

Allerthorpe Hall is a historic building near Burneston, a village in North Yorkshire, in England.

A Premonstratensian abbey was established around the site of the hall in 1190. It moved to become Coverham Abbey in 1215, and the old site probably became a monastic grange. The manor was sold to William Robinson in 1550, and it remained in the family until the 20th century. In 1608, the current manor house was constructed. Elizabeth Montagu stayed in the property on several occasions, and her son John died there. In later years, the house was often leased to other occupiers. The house has been little changed, although the front windows have been replaced with sashes. The house has been grade I listed since 1952.

The house is built of red brick on a shallow stone plinth, with stone dressings, and roofs in tile and pantile. There are two storeys and six bays, the outer bays being circular towers with comical roofs, and the four inner bays with dentilled eaves and a hipped roof. In the centre is a full height gabled porch with stone coping and shaped kneelers. The outer entrance has a four-centred arch, and the inner doorway has a carved surround including the date. The windows in the outer bays are casements, and elsewhere is a mix of windows, some mullioned, and others sashes, some horizontally sliding. On the upper floor of the left return is timber framing with lath and plaster infill. Inside, two ground floor rooms and one first floor room have early-17th century panelling, with two of the rooms having elaborate overmantels.

The gate piers in front of the house are of similar date to the house and are separately grade I listed. They are constructed of rusticated stone and have a square plan. Each pier has a plinth, the inner face has a rusticated pilaster with a moulded cornice and a bracket. The entablature has a moulded band at the base, a frieze with panels, a large moulded cornice and blocking course, and a large cushion and ball finial.

== See also ==
- Grade I listed buildings in North Yorkshire (district)
- Listed buildings in Swainby with Allerthorpe
