= Listed buildings in Carthorpe =

Carthorpe is a civil parish in the county of North Yorkshire, England. It contains six listed buildings that are recorded in the National Heritage List for England. All the listed buildings are designated at Grade II, the lowest of the three grades, which is applied to "buildings of national importance and special interest". The parish contains the village of Carthorpe and the surrounding countryside. The listed buildings consist of a country house and its ice house, a farmhouse and associated farm buildings, and two houses in the village.

== Buildings ==
Name and location	Photograph	Date	Notes
Manor House; 54.24880°N 1.52717°W	—	Early 18th century	The house is in red brick on a stone plinth with chamfered coping, floor bands, and a stone slate roof with stone coping and shaped kneelers. There are two storeys and five bays, and a lower two-storey two-bay rendered wing on the left. The doorway has Doric half-columns, a fanlight, a frieze and a dentilled cornice. The windows are sashes.
Borrowdale House; 54.24873°N 1.52904°W	—	Mid 18th century	The house is in red brick, and was extended in the 19th century. The original range has two storeys and four bays, and a pantile roof. To the right and projecting is the later wing with a single storey and three bays. It has dentilled eaves, and a stone slate roof with stone coping. The doorway and the windows in both parts, which are sashes, have flat brick arches.
Ice House south of Camp Hill House; 54.23704°N 1.52264°W	—	Late 18th century	The ice house is in red brick, and is largely covered in earth. It has a circular plan with a brick barrel vaulted entrance passage. Three steps lead down to a circular chamber 8 feet (2.4 m) deep, with a domed roof.
Camp Hill House; 54.23717°N 1.52324°W		Early 19th century	A small country house in stone, with brick at the rear, a sill band, a moulded cornice and a blocking course, and a hipped slate roof. There are two storeys, nine bays, and a rear wing. The middle three bays project, and contain a Doric porch with two columns, two pilasters, dosserets without a frieze, and a cornice, and a double doorway with a moulded architrave, and a fanlight with radial glazing bars. The windows are sashes, most of those in the ground floor with moulded architraves, and those in the upper floor with cornices on consoles.
East Lodge Farmhouse; 54.23935°N 1.51915°W		Early 19th century	The farmhouse is in red brick with stone dressings and a stone slate roof. There are two storeys and a symmetrical front of three bays. The central doorway has a fanlight, the windows are sashes, and all the openings on the front have flat heads with incised voussoirs. At the rear is a round-arched stair window.
Farm buildings, East Lodge Farm; 54.23948°N 1.51877°W	—	1862	A complex of farm buildings in red brick, with dressings in dark red brick, quoins, and hipped Welsh slate roofs. It consists of three gabled single-storey ranges, at the rear is a taller two-storey barn, and there is a further wing at right angles. At the south end of each range is a basket-arched opening, and in the centre is a tall wagon entrance, above which is a sundial and a dated and initialled plaque. At the north end is a tapering square chimney.
