= Robinson Almshouses =

Historic building in Burneston, North Yorkshire, England

Coordinates: 54°15′34″N 1°31′43″W

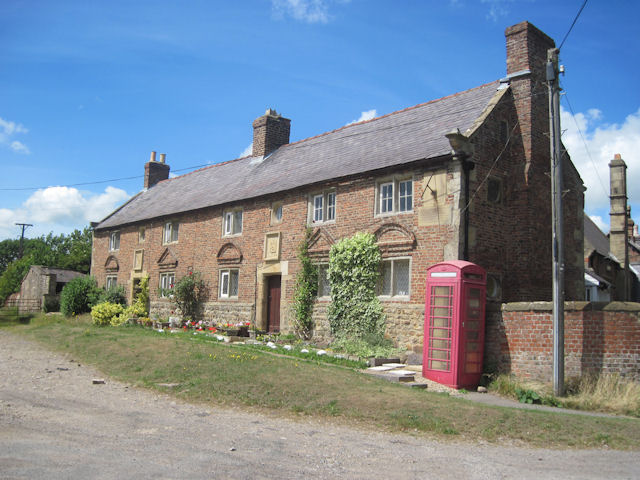
The building, in 2010

The Robinson Almshouses are a historic building in Burneston, a village in North Yorkshire in England.

The almshouses were constructed in 1680, with an endowment from Matthew Robinson, the local vicar. In 1688, he founded a grammar school, with the schoolroom attached to the almshouses. The almshouses were later converted into two cottages. The building was Grade II* listed in 1966. It became vacant in the early 21st century. In 2022, it was remodelled to form two refurbished houses, and a new one-bedroom house, while the nearby former headmaster's house was extended to produce a four-bedroom property.

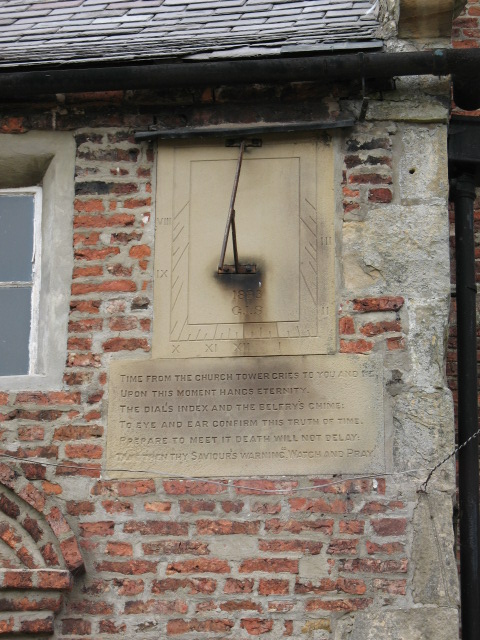
The sundial

The building is constructed of stone and red brick on a coped stone plinth, with stone dressings, quoins, and a Welsh slate roof with stone copings and shaped kneelers. There are two storeys and seven bays. The two doorways have quoined surrounds and four-centred arched lintels, and above each is a tablet with a moulded surround, one with an inscription and the date, and the other with a coat of arms, over which is an elliptical window in a square surround. The other windows are mullioned and contain casements. Over the ground floor windows are segmental or triangular pediments, and to the right is a stone sundial with an inscription. In the gable ends are windows with four circular lights in a square surround.

== See also ==
- Grade II* listed buildings in North Yorkshire (district)
- Listed buildings in Burneston
