= The Hall, Kirklington =

Historic building in Kirklington, England

Coordinates: 54.2266°N 1.5178°W

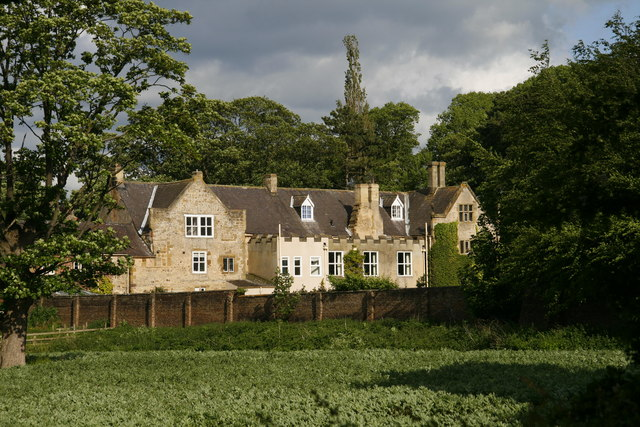
The building, in 2009

The Hall is a historic building in Kirklington, North Yorkshire, a village in England.

The house was built in about 1570, for Christopher Wandesford. The north gable collapsed at the end of the 18th century and was quickly rebuilt, while in the 19th century the main front was altered, and the west front was simplified. The building was grade II* listed in 1952.

The house is built of rubble, partly rendered, and has a Welsh slate roof. It is partly in two storeys with attics, and partly in three storeys. The east front has six bays, the west front has a central embattled range and flanking gabled cross-wings, and there is a two-storey wing to the north. Features include coped pedimented gables and finials, quoins, and doorways with four-centred arched heads. The windows are a mix, and include sashes, some horizontally-sliding, and mullioned windows, some also with transoms.

Inside, there are two rooms of particular interest, both on the first floor: the drawing room and the smoking room. The drawing room has its original 16th-century panelling, with a plaster frieze above, depicting animals, escallops and pomegranates. The fireplace is 18th century, set in an elaborate 17th-century overmantel. The Victoria County History describes the room as "an exceedingly handsome example" of Elizabethan design. The smoking room has 17th-century panelling, an 18th-century fire surround, mantelpiece, overmantel and cornice. There is also an early-18th century glass-fronted cupboard in a bedroom, and several original stone doorcases on the ground floor.

== See also ==
- Grade II* listed buildings in North Yorkshire (district)
- Listed buildings in Kirklington-cum-Upsland
