= St Michael's Church, Kirklington =

Church in North Yorkshire, England

Coordinates: 54°13′27″N 1°30′46″W

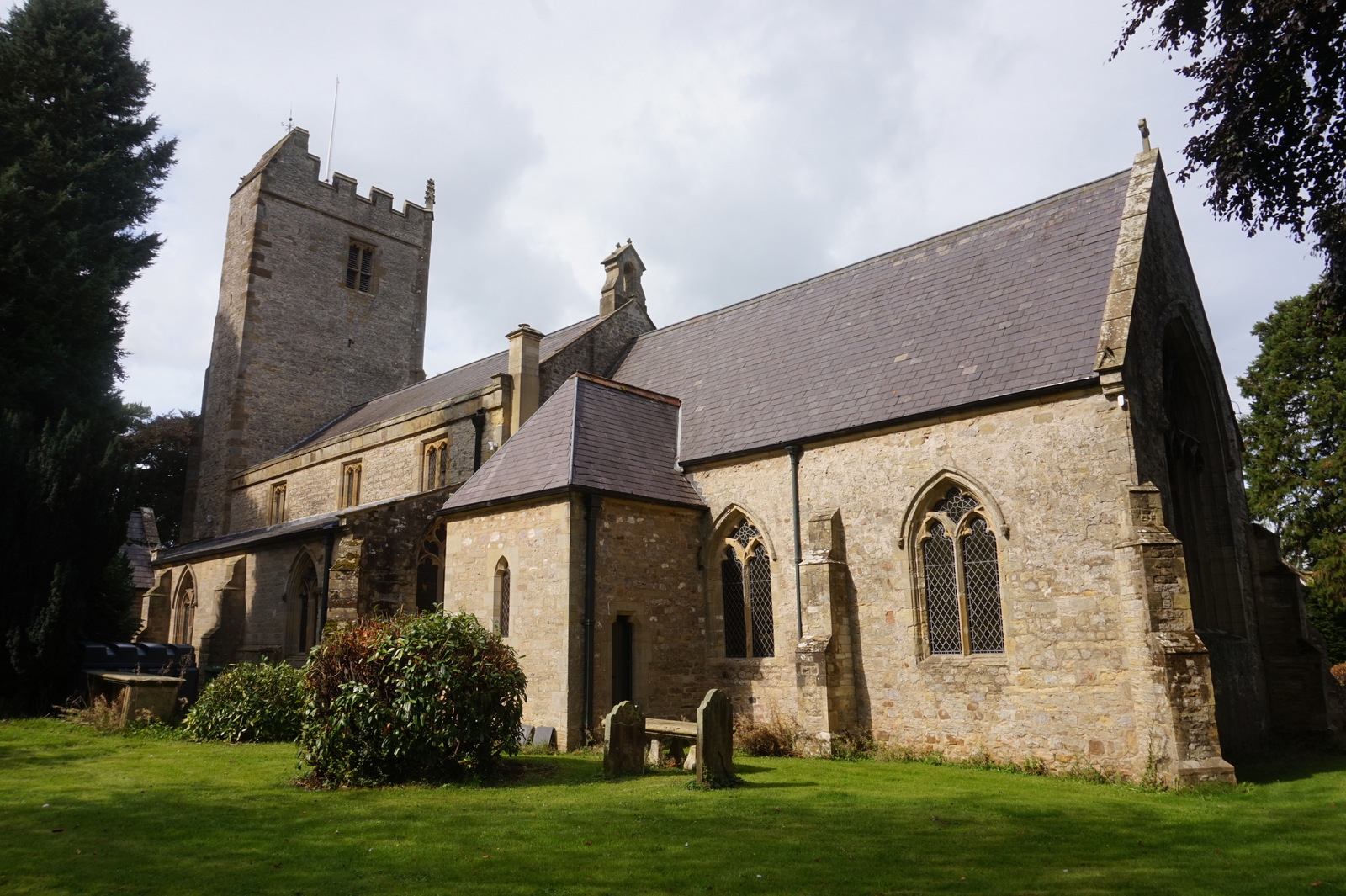
The church, in 2020

St Michael's Church is the parish church of Kirklington, North Yorkshire, a village in England.

The nave of the church may date from the early 12th century, while the chancel was built in the early 13th century and was remodelled in about 1340, at which time aisles were added to the nave. The tower and clerestory were added in the 15th century. The church was restored by George Fowler Jones between 1857 and 1858, who also added a vestry and north and south porches. The building was grade I listed in 1966.

The church is built of stone with Welsh slate roofs, and consists of a nave with a clerestory, north and south aisles, north and south porches, a chancel with a north and south vestry, and a west tower. The tower has three stages, diagonal buttresses, a full-height stair tower in the south corner, a three-light west window with a hood mould, a clock face on the north side, two-light bell openings, and an embattled parapet with crocketed corner pinnacles. On the east gable of the nave is a bell turret.

Inside, there is a 19th-century font on a 14th-century base, a pulpit with reused woodwork of about 1600, and a Victorian rood screen. In the south aisle there are two late-14th-century tomb recesses containing a military effigy and the effigy of a lady. They are thought to represent Elizabeth Musters and her first husband, Sir Alexander de Mowbray. Next to them is the large tomb of Christopher Wandesford, who died in 1590. The arcades have three carvings of grimacing faces and one of two animals around a human face. The north vestry window contains fragments of mediaeval and 17th-century stained glass.

== See also ==
- Grade I listed buildings in North Yorkshire (district)
- Listed buildings in Kirklington-cum-Upsland
