= Burneston =

Village and civil parish in North Yorkshire, England

Coordinates: 54°15′38″N 1°31′43″W

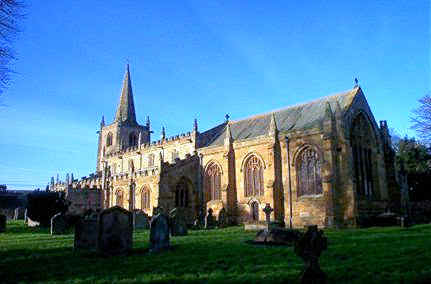
- St Lambert's Church, Burneston

- Location within North Yorkshire
- Population: 311 (2011 census)
- OS grid reference: SE308850
  - London: 200 mi (320 km) SSE
- Civil parish: Burneston
- Unitary authority: North Yorkshire
- Ceremonial county: North Yorkshire
- Region: Yorkshire and the Humber
- Country: England
- Sovereign state: United Kingdom
- Post town: Bedale
- Postcode district: DL8
- Police: North Yorkshire
- Fire: North Yorkshire
- Ambulance: Yorkshire
- UK Parliament: Thirsk and Malton

Burneston is a village and civil parish in North Yorkshire, England. According to the 2001 Census it had a population of 244, increasing to 311 at the 2011 Census. The village is close to the A1(M) road and is about 4 miles (6 km) south-east of Bedale.

== History ==
The name Burneston derives from either the Old Norse personal name Bryning or the Old English bryneing meaning 'place cleared by burning', and the Old English tūn meaning 'settlement'.

The village is recorded in the Domesday Book as "Brennigston" and at the time was the property of Merleswein the Sheriff. The King passed ownership to Count Alan of Brittany, who made Robert of Moutiers the local landlord.

In 1591 the lordship was granted to Sir Richard Theakston by the Queen. It subsequently passed through the Pierse family of Bedale in 1639, the Wastell family in 1682, to eventually reside in 1830 with Matthew Montagu, 4th Baron Rokeby.

The old Roman road of Dere Street ran near the village and now follows the route of the A1(M).

The Robinson Almshouses in Main Street, later partly used as a school, were built in 1680 and are Grade II* listed.

== Governance ==
Until 2023, Burneston was part of the Richmond (Yorks) parliamentary constituency. It was removed and added to the expanded Thirsk and Malton Constituency, in part due to areas from that constituency being created into a new seat of Wetherby and Easingwold. From 1974 to 2023 it was part of the Hambleton District, it is now administered by the unitary North Yorkshire Council.

== Geography ==
The village lies 0.5 miles (0.8 km) west of the A1(M) road on the B6285. The nearest settlements are Theakston, 1 mile (1.6 km) to the north; Carthorpe 0.55 miles (0.9 km) to the south; Snape 2.7 miles (4.3 km) to the west and Pickhill 2.3 miles (3.7 km) to the east. It is 135 feet (41 m) above sea level. In the late nineteenth century the population was recorded as 253. According to the 2001 UK Census, the population of the village was 244 in 100 households, of which 196 were over sixteen years of age and 124 of those were in employment. There are 107 dwellings in total.

== Community facilities ==
The village has one public house, The Woodman Inn, and a post office. The village is served by three school bus services, one that picks up primary school children from the surrounding area who attend the village school, and two that serve secondary pupils attending Bedale High School, Outwood Academy or Ripon Grammar School. There is one regular bus service that stops in the village on the Bedale to Ripon route.

== Education ==
There is one school, the Burneston CE (Voluntary Aided) Primary School in the village. The school admits pupils from several of the nearby communities including Melmerby; Wath; Norton Conyers; East Tanfield; Middleton Quernhow; Sutton Howgrave; Kirklington; Carthorpe; Theakston and Exelby. Secondary education can be found at Bedale High School.

== Religion ==
The village church is dedicated to St Lambert. It was built in three stages between 1395 and 1550 and is a Grade I listed building. Though the village is its own civil parish, it is also part of the ecumenically United Parish of Kirklington, Burneston, Wath and Pickhill.

== See also ==
- Grade I listed buildings in North Yorkshire
- Listed buildings in Burneston

== Gallery ==
Views of Burneston
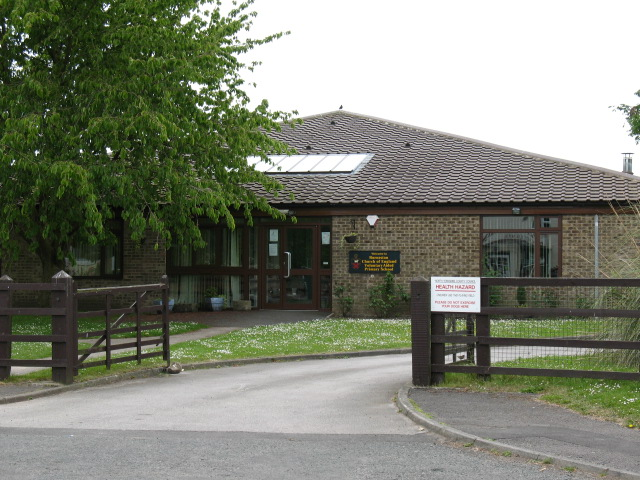
Burneston CofE Primary School

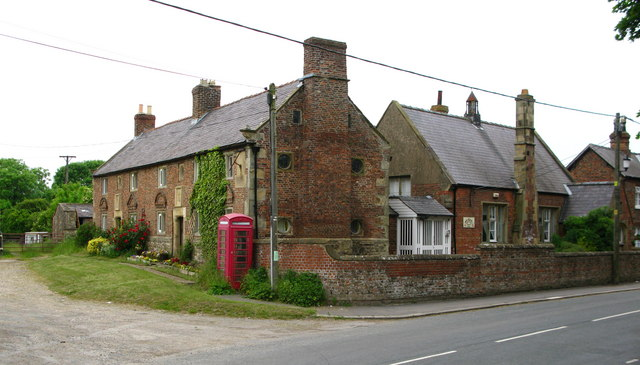
Burneston Old School

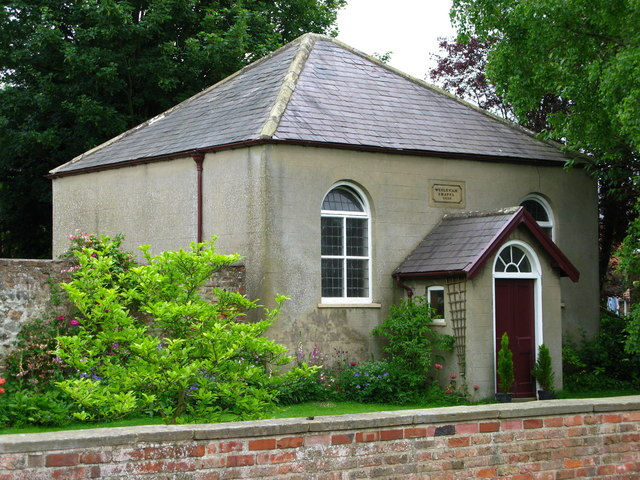
Wesleyan Chapel, Burneston

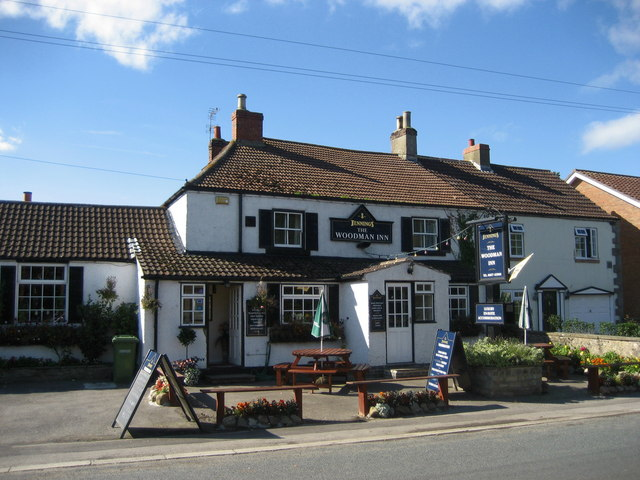
Woodman Inn, Burneston

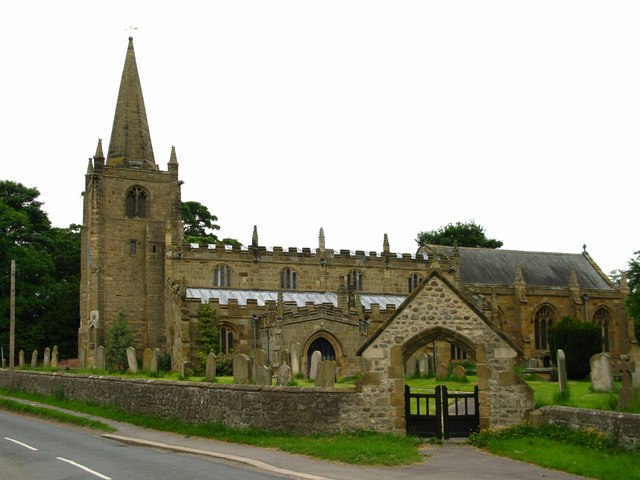
St Lambert's, Burneston
