= Howgrave =

Civil parish in North Yorkshire, England

Coordinates: 54.2167°N 1.5125°W

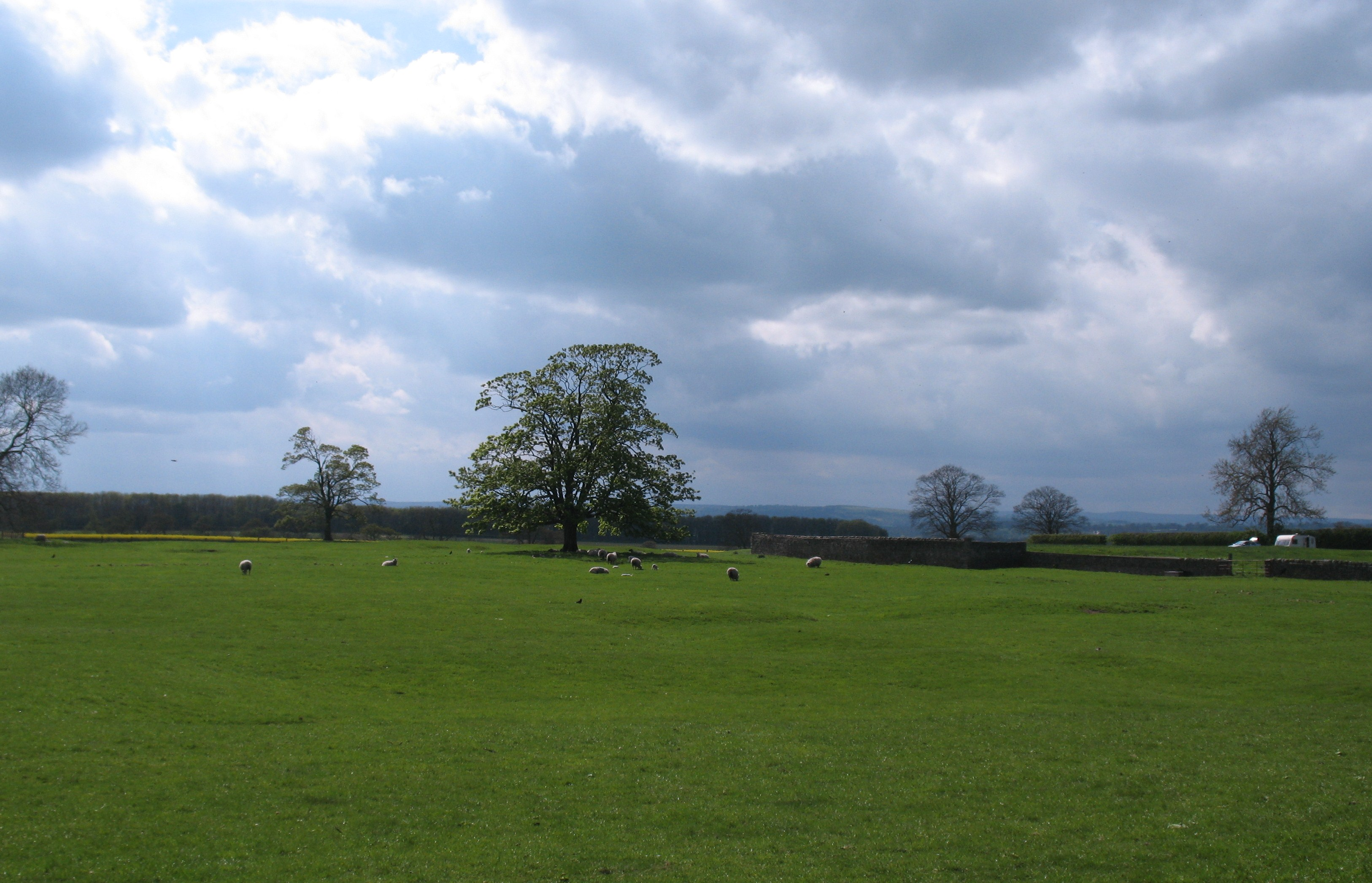
- All that remains are humps and bumps in this field

- Location within North Yorkshire
- Population: 10
- OS grid reference: SE319800
- Civil parish: Howgrave
- Unitary authority: North Yorkshire
- Ceremonial county: North Yorkshire
- Region: Yorkshire and the Humber
- Country: England
- Sovereign state: United Kingdom
- Post town: BEDALE
- Postcode district: DL8
- Police: North Yorkshire
- Fire: North Yorkshire
- Ambulance: Yorkshire

Howgrave is a civil parish in North Yorkshire, England. It is a very small parish, with an area of only 323 acres (131 ha) and an estimated population in 2014 of only 10. There is no modern village in the parish. The site of the deserted medieval village of Howgrave lies in the west of the parish, 0.3 miles (0.5 km) west of the village of Sutton Howgrave.

Despite its small size Howgrave has a complicated geography and history. Today Howgrave is divided between two civil parishes, Howgrave itself and Sutton with Howgrave, which, despite its name, includes only part of Howgrave. Until the 19th century both parishes were townships in the ancient parish of Kirklington in the North Riding of Yorkshire, but small parts of Howgrave were detached parts of two other townships and parishes. A farm and a house were detached parts of the township of Nunwick cum Howgrave in the parish of Ripon, and another house was a detached part of the township of Holme cum Howgrave in the parish of Pickhill.

The toponym is derived from the Old English hol grāf, meaning "grove in the hollow". Howgrave was mentioned in the Domesday Book (as Hograve), when different carucates were held by three different owners, the Earl of Richmond, the Archbishop of York and the Bishop of Durham. It was considered a separate manor of Kirklington in the 16th century, but by 1640 it was recorded that there were no inhabitants in the township. Howgrave became a separate civil parish in 1866. The detached parts of Nunwick cum Howgrave, a total of 118 acres (48 ha), became detached parts of the new civil parish of Nunwick cum Howgrave. In the late 19th century 33 acres (13 ha) of the detached parts of Nunwick cum Howgrave were transferred to the civil parish of Howgrave, and 85 acres (34 ha) of Nunwick cum Howgrave were transferred to the civil parish of Sutton Howgrave.

In 1974 Howgrave was transferred to Hambleton district in the new county of North Yorkshire. Hambleton was abolished in 2023, it is now administered by the unitary North Yorkshire Council. Since 1978 it has shared a grouped parish council, Kirklington with Sutton Howgrave, with the parishes of Kirklington-cum-Upsland and Sutton with Howgrave.
