= Zachary Cawdry =

Church of England clergyman

The Reverend Zachary Cawdry
- Rector of Barthomley
- Province: York
- Diocese: Chester

Personal details
- Denomination: Anglican
- Education: St. John's College, Cambridge

Zachary Cawdry or Cawdrey (1616 – 1684) was a Church of England clergyman and writer, author of the Discourse of Patronage (1675). He was Rector of Barthomley in Cheshire during the Commonwealth, and for fourteen years after the Restoration.

== Biography ==
=== Life ===
Zachary Cawdry was born in 1616 at Melton Mowbray, of which town his father, also called Zachary, was vicar. He was educated for seven years at the free school at Melton, and went thence, at the age of sixteen, to St. John's College, Cambridge, where he was "sub or proper sizar to the then master, Dr. Humphrey Gower. In 1642 he proceeded MA, was proctor 1647–8, and in 1649 became rector of Barthomley in Cheshire. He continued at Barthomley until his death in 1684, and was buried there "near his wife, Helen, and his very dear pupil, John Crewe".

=== Works ===
Cawdry's one title to fame is his Discourse of Patronage, which, though little more than a pamphlet (it contains only forty-five pages), well deserves to escape oblivion. It gives a very lucid and sensible account of the subject, written with great vigour and eloquence, and closes with an earnest appeal for reform. Its full title is A Discourse of Patronage; being a Modest Enquiry into the Original of it, and a further Prosecution of the History of it, with a True Account of the Original and Rise of Vicarages, and a Proposal for the Enlarging their Revenues. Also an Humble Supplication to the Pious Nobility and Gentry to endeavour the Prevention of Abuses of the Honorary Trust of Patronage, with a Proposal of some Expedients for regulating it, most agreeable to Primitive Pattern; wherein at once the just Rights of Patrons are secured, and the People's Liberty of Election of their own Minister in a great measure indulged. By Z. Cawdry, 1675. The little work is divided into seven chapters, which treat respectively of:

1. The Original of the Evangelical Ministry, showing the Primitive Church to have been not Parochial, but Diocesan.
2. The Maintenance of the Clergy in Primitive Churches.
3. The Donation of Tithes by Kings and Emperors.
4. The Original of Patronage by Donation of Manse and Glebe.
5. The Original of Impropriation and Vicarages.
6. Mischiefs of Simony.
7. A Supplication to the Nobility and Gentry.

The only other publication of Cawdry extant is a single sermon preached at Bowdon in Cheshire, at the funeral of Lord Delamere, better known as Sir George Booth, whose rising in 1659 "gave" (to use the language of the preacher) "the first warm and invigorating spring-beam to the frostnipt loyalty of the nation".

== Bibliography ==
- Overton, John Henry (1887). "Cawdry, Zachary" . In Stephen, Leslie (ed.). Dictionary of National Biography. Vol. 9. London: Smith, Elder & Co. pp. 377–378.
- Notes and Queries. Vol. VIII.—No. 198. Saturday, August 13. 1853. p. 11.
