= Theakston, North Yorkshire =

Village and civil parish in North Yorkshire, England

Coordinates: 54.26714°N 1.53597°W

Theakston
- Location within North Yorkshire
- Population: 143 (2011 census)
- OS grid reference: SE450959
- Unitary authority: North Yorkshire
- Ceremonial county: North Yorkshire
- Region: Yorkshire and the Humber
- Country: England
- Sovereign state: United Kingdom
- Post town: Bedale
- Postcode district: DL8
- Police: North Yorkshire
- Fire: North Yorkshire
- Ambulance: Yorkshire
- UK Parliament: Thirsk and Malton

Theakston is a village and civil parish in North Yorkshire, England. The population of the civil parish at the 2011 census was 143.

== Geography ==
The village is situated just west of the A1(M) motorway, and is about three miles south-east of Bedale. The B6285 road passes through the village.

== History ==
=== Etymology ===
In the Domesday Book the place is recorded as Eston, in the 13th to 16th century as Texton, Thexton, or Thekeston and in the 17th century as Theakstone. The surname Theakston is derived from the name of the village.

If the spelling "Thekeston" is assumed to be correct, the name of the village can be derived from the Old English given name Teodec and the suffix -tun, meaning "The farm (tun) of Teodec".

The name "Theakston" is also believed to derive from the name of the leader of a family settling the area during the Anglo-Saxon colonisation of England. The first part "Theaks" is derived from the Norse "Að Åke’s". "Að" (with ð sounding like the English "th") became the English word "at". Åke is a common Scandinavian given name. The suffix "-ton" (equivalent to "tuin" in Dutch = a garden and of "Zaun" in German = a fence and derived from old Germanic root word "tun") indicates an enclosure or in a wider sense a homestead. Hence "Að Åkes Tun" means "At Åke's Homestead" and was changed over time into Theakston. The derivation is similar to that of Atherstone near Nuneaton which retained the "th" while the "k" was dropped, and gained an "e" at the end.

A less likely explanation is that the name may be a corruption of "Thatchton", which in turn describes the roofing material thatch, popular in many towns at that time. However, while thatch was common in many areas in the southern part of England, it was not as common in the area surrounding Theakston where the predominant building and roofing material was and is stone.

=== Administrative history ===
In 1086 Theakston was recorded as being associated with Burneston with 12 carucates under the overlordship of the Honour of Richmond and count Alan Rufus. Mesne lordships were held by the lords of Middleham (8 carucates) and in the 13th century by Robert de Musters (1 carucate). The former was gradually acquired by the Abbey of Coverham and the priory of Mount Grace, and was granted to Sir Richard Theakston after the Dissolution of the Monasteries. The latter went to the hospital of St. Leonard's and was also granted to Richard Theakston in 1590. His descendants sold the demesne lands in 1630, and they changed hands several more times in the following centuries.

Theakston was a township in the parish of Burneston with a population of 57 persons around 1870 and an area of 991 acres (401 ha). It became a civil parish in the late 19th century. From 1836 to 1936 it was part of the Bedale Registration District, then until 1974 of the Wensleydale Registration District. As of 2017, Burneston, Swainby with Allerthorpe, and Theakston have a common Parish Council. Until 2023, Theakston was part of the Richmond (Yorks) parliamentary constituency. It was removed and added to the expanded Thirsk and Malton Constituency, in part due to areas from that constituency being created into a new seat of Wetherby and Easingwold.

From 1974 to 2023 it was part of the Hambleton District, it is now administered by the unitary North Yorkshire Council.

== Notable buildings ==
Theakston Hall and Theakston Lodge are Grade II listed structures. The former is a large rendered brick and stone building originating in the late 18th century with moulded stone ornaments. The latter is a mid- to late-18th century house build from brick with Doric half columns surrounding the central door.
