= Kirklington, North Yorkshire =

Village in North Yorkshire, England

Coordinates: 54°13′32″N 1°30′45″W

Kirklington
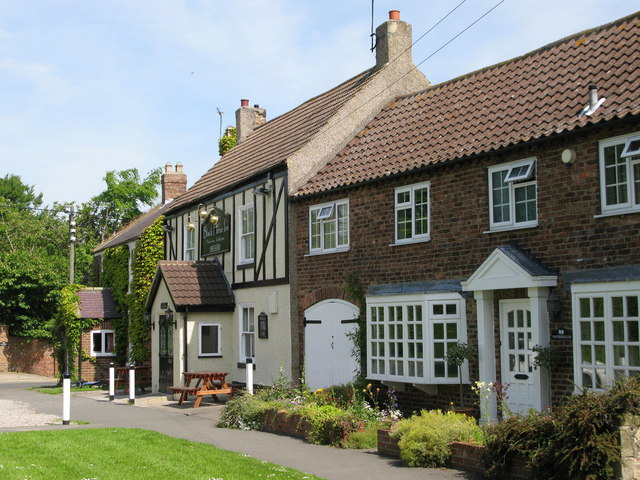
- Kirklington Village

- Location within North Yorkshire
- Population: 220
- OS grid reference: SE319810
- Unitary authority: North Yorkshire
- Ceremonial county: North Yorkshire
- Region: Yorkshire and the Humber
- Country: England
- Sovereign state: United Kingdom
- Post town: BEDALE
- Postcode district: DL8 2
- Police: North Yorkshire
- Fire: North Yorkshire
- Ambulance: Yorkshire
- UK Parliament: Richmond and Northallerton

Kirklington is a village in the English county of North Yorkshire close to the A1(M) motorway. Kirklington forms the major part of the civil parish of Kirklington-cum-Upsland.

The population of the parish in the 2001 UK Census was 277, 315 in the 2011 census and estimated to be 220 in 2014.

== Governance ==
The village lies within the Richmond and Northallerton UK Parliament constituency. From 1974 to 2023 it was part of the Hambleton District, it is now administered by the unitary North Yorkshire Council.

== History ==
There is some evidence of Roman occupation around the village, in the form of a white-ware burial at the Lady well, a stretch of Healam Beck, behind the Hall. Also close to the village on the A1(M), at Healam Bridge lie buried the remains of a Roman Dere Street fort, almost entirely ploughed away. Just beyond the village to the north lies 'Camp Hill', the remains of an Iron Age camp.

The name Kirklington derives from the Old English Cyrtlaingtūn meaning 'settlement connected with Cyrtla'.

Kirklington is mentioned in the Domesday Book as Cherdinton alongside Yarnwick, a lost village whose remains lie to the north of the village, between the Hall and Camp Hill prehistoric sites. The principal landowner at the time was Count Alan of Brittany. At the time of the Norman invasion the Lord of the Manor was Rosskell, but the title was granted by the Crown to Robert of Moutiers. The Anglicised form of Moutiers was Musters and this family held the manor until the mid 14th century, when is passed via marriage into the Wandesforde family. The line of succession was not a complete one thereafter, but the name was continued by those marrying into the family who adopted the Wandesford surname. Among the notable people to hold the title were Christopher Wandesford, successively MP for Aldborough, Richmond and Thirsk and briefly Lord Deputy of Ireland. In 1662, his son, another Christopher Wandesford was created a baronet and his son, yet another Christopher, was created Viscount Castlecomer in 1707. John Wandesford, 5th Viscount Castlecomer was created Earl Wandesford in 1758, but the title ended with him as he had no male issue.

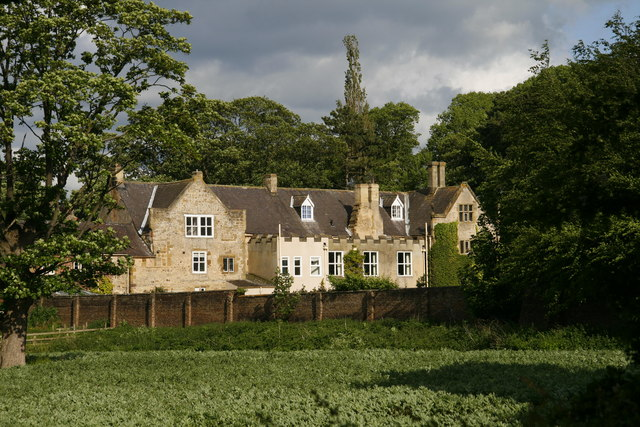
The Hall, Kirklington

The Hall which stands in Whinwath Lane on the northern edge of the village, was built c. 1570 for Sir Christopher Wandesford, with alterations in the early 18th and 19th centuries. It is a Grade II* listed building.

There was a school house, now converted to housing, that served the village until the 1970s.

A Neolithic burial mound known variously as 'Stapler's Mound' or 'Stapley Mound' lies between the village and the A1(M) motorway. Many of the village's houses are still owned by the estate.

There are three known ghost stories about the village, one in the pub, one in the Hall and one around Stapley Lane.

== Parish ==
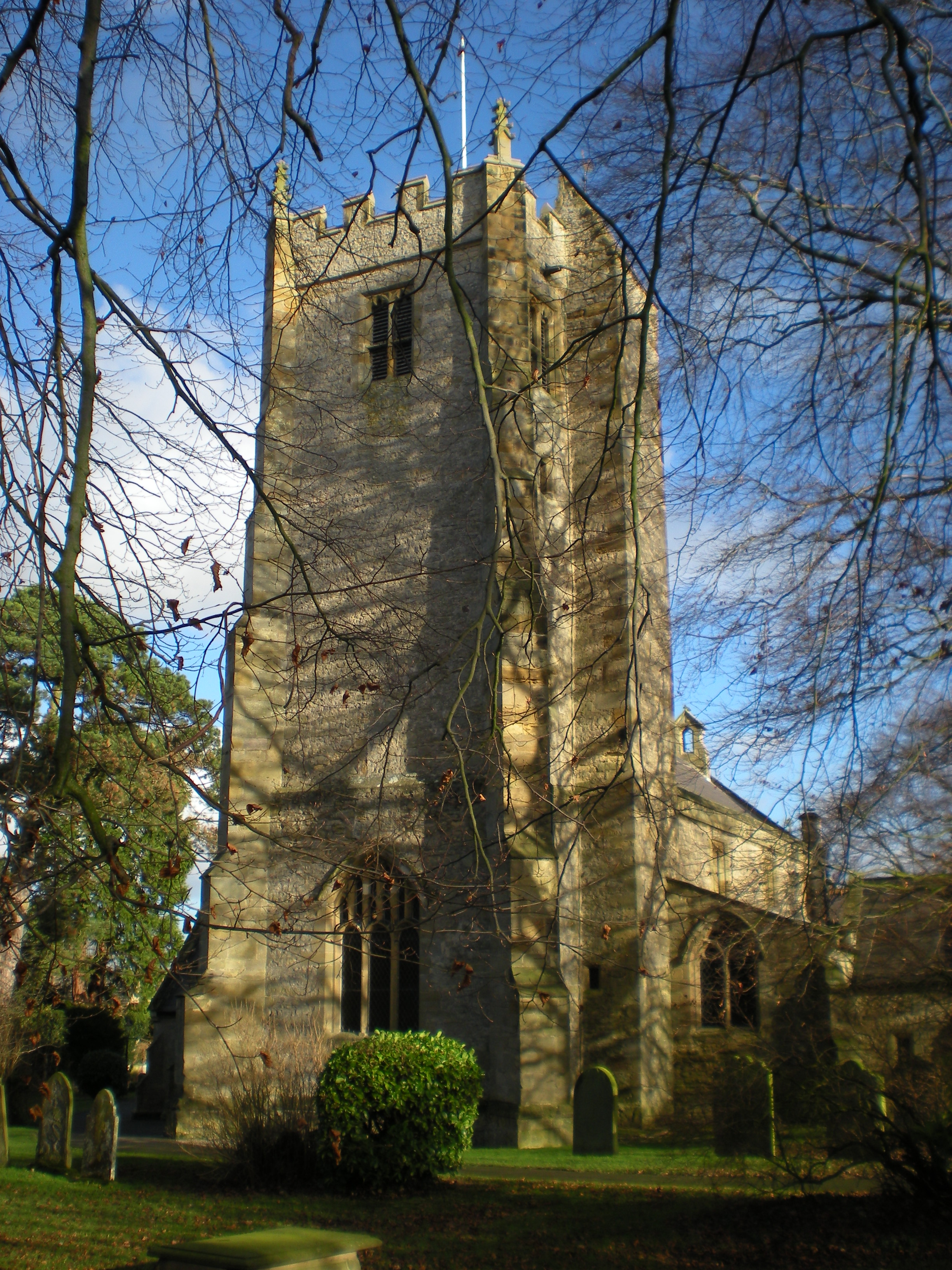
The church of St Michael from the churchyard

Kirklington was a large ancient parish, with an area of 4,164 acres (1,685 ha). Until the 19th century it included the townships of Kirklington with Upsland, Howgrave, Sutton Howgrave and East Tanfield, all of which became separate civil parishes in 1866.

The ecclesiastical parish of Kirklington has now been united with other nearby parishes to form the united parish of Kirklington, Burneston, Wath and Pickhill.

St Michael's Church, Kirklington was built in the 13th century with subsequent restorations and contains banners and armour of the Wandesford family who still own the Hall. It is a Grade I listed Building.

== Amenities ==
The public house in the village is the Black Horse. On the edge of the village is a cricket pitch used by the village team.

== Geography ==
The nearest settlements are Carthorpe 1.8 miles (2.9 km) to the north; Sinderby 1.6 miles (2.6 km) to the east; Sutton Howgrave 1.3 miles (2.1 km) to the south and Thornborough, North Yorkshire 1.7 miles (2.7 km) to the south-west. Healam Beck flows northwards past the west side of the village as a tributary of the River Swale.

== Notable people ==
- Johanna Ropner, lord lieutenant of North Yorkshire, lives in the village
- Alice Thornton (1626–1707), writer, was born in the village
