= Church of St Lambert, Burneston =

Anglican church in North Yorkshire, England

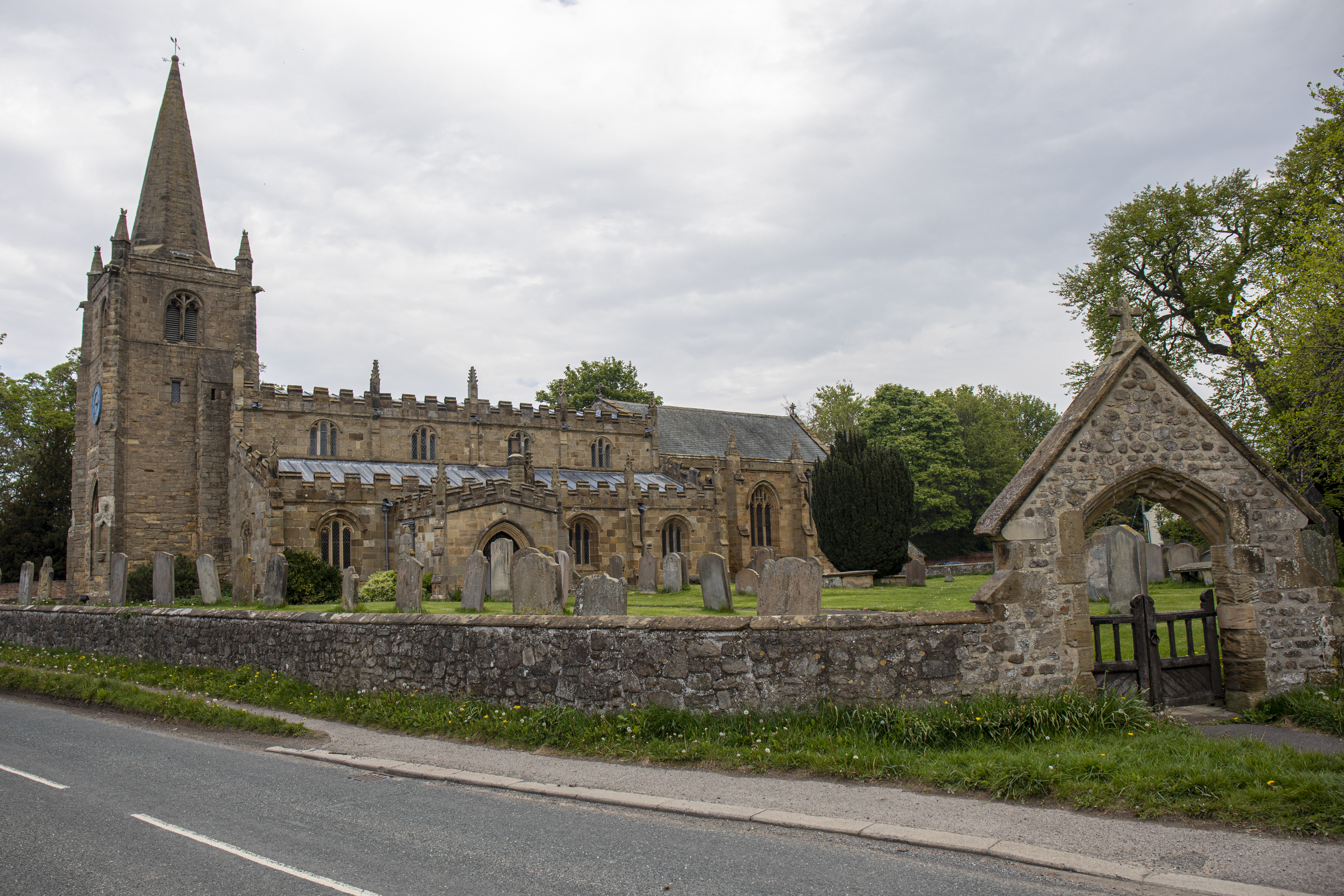
- Church of St Lambert Burneston from the south west
- Church of St Lambert, Burneston
- 54.259°N 1.527°W
- OS grid reference: SE 30865 84942
- Location: Burneston, North Yorkshire
- Country: England
- Denomination: Church of England
- Website: Official webpage

History
- Status: Parish church

Architecture
- Functional status: Active
- Style: Perpendicular

Administration
- Diocese: Diocese of Leeds
- Archdeaconry: Richmond and Craven
- Deanery: Wensley
- Benefice: Kirklington with Burneston and Wath and Pickhill
- Parish: Burneston

Clergy
- Vicar: Reverend Ruth Hind

Listed Building – Grade I
- Designated: 22 August 1966
- Reference no.: 1315164

The Church of St Lambert, Burneston, is the Anglican parish church for the village of Burneston in North Yorkshire, England. The church was built progressively in the 14th, 15th and 16th centuries, with some later additions and is now a grade I listed structure. It is the only Anglican church in England to be dedicated to St Lambert, and one of its former vicars, Canon John Hartley, was noted for being a winner at the Men's Singles championship at Wimbledon two years running.

The church was grade I listed in 1966.

== History ==
Whilst the current structure dates back to the 13th century, it is known that church existed at Burneston not long after the Domesday Book was collated, as Robert de Musters gave the church at Burneston to St Mary's Abbey in York during the tenure of William Rufus, who reigned between 1087 and 1100. The chancel was built in the 14th century, and the tower was added between 1400 and 1410. Each corner of the tower is supported by a buttress which had a shield bearing the coat of arms of some of the local noble families. Whilst many of the features of the church are finished in a Perpendicular style, the sedilla and chancel arch are in the Decorated style.

The church was renovated in 1854 by the Duchess of Cleveland, being described as "quite a model for a country parish." Almost the entire east end of the church is a window dedicated to the Duke of Cleveland, installed at the request of the duchess during the renovations. Glynne, who visited the church in 1871, (Note: Glynne recorded the church as Burniston.) described the church as "...wholly Perpendicular, very uniform, also in very good condition, though some of the improvements have been done too soon." Likewise, Pevsner described the church as being Perpendicular, and suggested the early fifteenth century for the date of the church.

St Lambert's is reputed to be the only Anglican church in Great Britain dedicated solely to Saint Lambert, a 7th century archbishop in Maastricht. (Note: Other churches do exist with a compound name such as the Church of St Mary and St Lambert, in Stonham Aspal, Suffolk) Historically, there was a fountain or well in the churchyard which has since been covered over or culverted. The well, known as Halig-Keld, (Note: The name derives from a mixture of Old English - Halig, meaning Holy, and Old Norse - Kelda, meaning Spring.) is thought to have possibly given rise to the name of the local wapentake - Hallikeld.

=== Listed structures ===
Besides the main structure of the church, which is grade I listed, there are three other listed structures in the churchyard;

- The two gateways and wall surrounding the church on the western and northern sides. They were built c. 15th century and are grade II listed
- The war memorial, grade II listed
- The tombstone of Francis Rund

== Parish and benefice ==
The church is part of the Benefice of Benefice of Kirklington with Burneston, Wath and Pickhill. St Lambert's is the largest church in the benefice with the ability to seat 300 people. The church has recorded an average weekly attendance of 60 people in 2011, which had dropped to 35 by 2019.

== Clergy ==
John Wilson, previously the headmaster of Westminster School, was the incumbent between 1622 and 1634. Wilson had also been the incumbent at nearby St Gregory's Church in Bedale.

Between 1874 and 1919, the incumbent at St Lambert's was the Canon John Hartley, who won the Wimbledon men's singles tournament in 1879 and 1880. His opponent in the 1879 match, Vere St. Leger Goold, was later convicted of murder. The vicar won the semi-final on the Friday, went back to Burneston to conduct the Sunday services, tended to an ill parishioner on the Monday, and then went back to London on the Tuesday. He changed into his tennis whites on the slow train between Waterloo and Wimbledon. John Hartley is buried in the churchyard underneath the east window.
