= East Tanfield =

Civil parish in North Yorkshire, England

Coordinates: 54.195°N 1.563°W

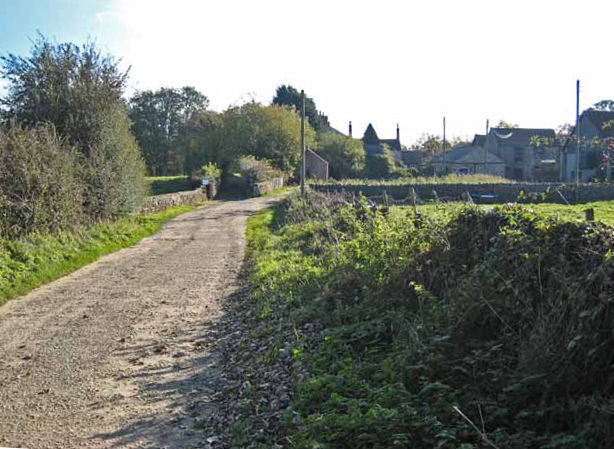
- Farm in East Tanfield

- Location within North Yorkshire
- Population: 30
- OS grid reference: SE290780
- Unitary authority: North Yorkshire
- Ceremonial county: North Yorkshire
- Region: Yorkshire and the Humber
- Country: England
- Sovereign state: United Kingdom
- Post town: RIPON
- Postcode district: HG4
- Dialling code: 01677
- Police: North Yorkshire
- Fire: North Yorkshire
- Ambulance: Yorkshire
- UK Parliament: Richmond and Northallerton

East Tanfield is a civil parish in North Yorkshire, England. There is no modern village in the parish, and the population was estimated at 30 in 2013. The deserted medieval village of East Tanfield lies near Manor Farm on the banks of the River Ure.

East Tanfield was mentioned in the Domesday Book, when it was in the possession of Count Alan of Brittany. It was a prosperous community in the medieval period, but appears to have been deserted in the 16th century.

East Tanfield was historically a township in the ancient parish of Kirklington in the North Riding of Yorkshire. It became a separate civil parish in 1866. It was transferred to the Richmondshire district of North Yorkshire in 1974. Richmondshire was abolished in 2023 and a new unitary authority, North Yorkshire Council, replaced it.

The parish shares a grouped parish council, Tanfield Parish Council, with the much larger parish of West Tanfield.

== See also ==
- Listed buildings in East Tanfield
