= Kirby-on-the-Moor =

Village and civil parish in North Yorkshire, England

Coordinates: 54°06′34″N 1°24′18″W

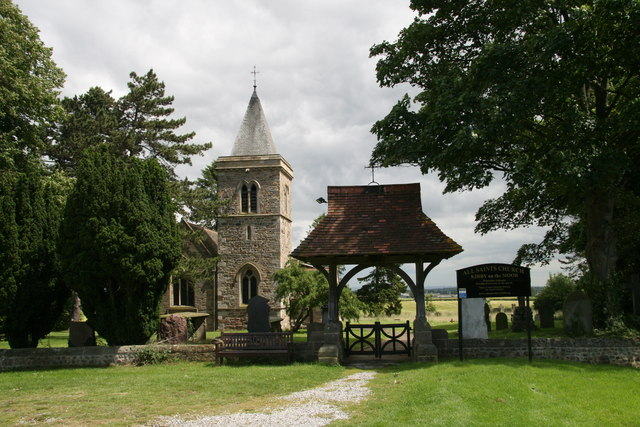
- All Saints' parish church

- Location within North Yorkshire
- Population: 391 (2011 Census)
- OS grid reference: SE389683
- Civil parish: Kirby Hill
- Unitary authority: North Yorkshire
- Ceremonial county: North Yorkshire
- Region: Yorkshire and the Humber
- Country: England
- Sovereign state: United Kingdom
- Post town: York
- Postcode district: YO51
- Dialling code: 01423
- Police: North Yorkshire
- Fire: North Yorkshire
- Ambulance: Yorkshire
- UK Parliament: Skipton and Ripon
- Website: www.kirbyhill.org

Kirby-on-the-Moor, now known as Kirby Hill, is a village in the Kirby Hill civil parish about 1 mile (1.6 km) north of the market town of Boroughbridge, in North Yorkshire, England.

== Geography ==
The village is on a section of the Great North Road that is now the B6265. It was part of the A1 until the section of the A1(M) west of the village was built. The village is 85–131 feet (26–40 m) above sea level. The A1(M) motorway passes approximately 500m west of the village.

The 2001 Census recorded the population as 355, of whom 294 were more than 16 years old and 168 of these were in employment. There were 155 dwellings of which 105 were detached. The 2011 Census recorded the population as 391.

== Manor ==
The Domesday Book of 1086 records Kirby as Chirchbi in the hundred of Hallikeld. Gospatric, son of Arnketil held the manor of Kirby at the time of the Norman conquest of England. Afterwards the manor was seized by the Crown, but Gospatric remained lord of the manor on behalf of the King.

At some date the manor passed to the Mowbray family, who later sold part of it to Newburgh Priory. After the priory was dissolved in the 16th century the Crown granted the manor to the Nevill family of Thornton Bridge. In 1672 the Nevill family sold the manor to Sir Robert Long. In the 19th century the Rawson family of Nidd Hall bought the manor.

== Church and chapel ==
=== Parish church ===
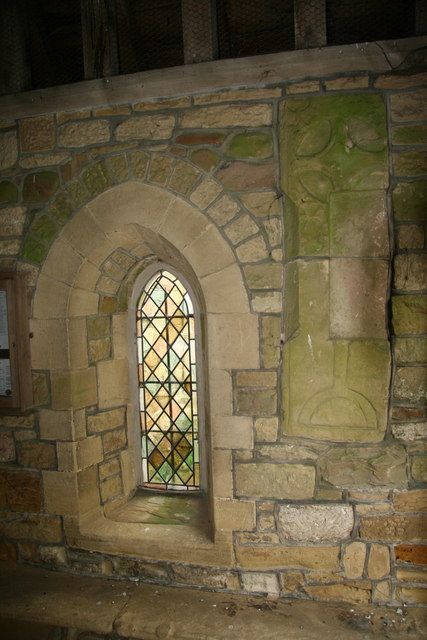
Inside the 19th-century south porch of All Saints' parish church, showing some of the early Mediæval masonry incorporated into one wall

The oldest parts of the All Saints' Church, Kirby-on-the-Moor are Anglo-Saxon and were built in the 10th century.

=== Chapel ===
There used to be a Wesleyan chapel in the village.

== Economic and social history ==
In a rebellion of barons against Edward II in 1322, Sir Andreas de Harcla mustered his army near Kirby Hill before the Battle of Boroughbridge.

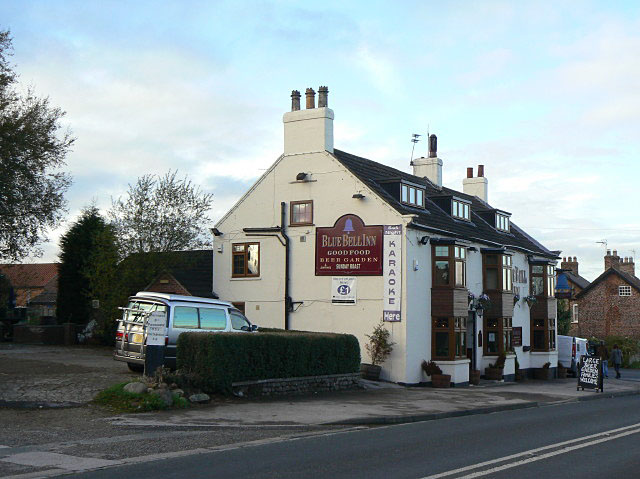
The Blue Bell Inn on Leeming Lane

The Pilmoor, Boroughbridge and Knaresborough Railway ran through the parish. It was opened from Pilmoor Junction on the East Coast Main Line to Boroughbridge in 1847 and operated by the North Eastern Railway. In 1875 it was extended from Boroughbridge to Knaresborough. In 1964 British Railways closed the line.

Since 1996, residents of Kirby Hill have campaigned to stop developers from gaining planning permission for a motorway service area on the A1(M) about 500 yards (460 m) north-west of the village. On 16 October 2012 the then Secretary of State for Communities and Local Government, Eric Pickles, formally rejected the plan after the third public inquiry. On 19 November 2019, Harrogate Borough Council's Planning Committee rejected a new MSA scheme at the same site proposed by Applegreen. However, the application was granted outline planning permission, subject to a long list of conditions, in April 2021 by a Government Planning Inspector, David Rose, after a fourth Public Inquiry. Applegreen did not progress the granted permission for two years and in March 2023 submitted an application to Harrogate Borough Council to vary the permission that had been granted. This was approved by the new unitary authority, North Yorkshire Council in December 2023. Applegreen submitted a reserved matters planning application, which will again have to be determined by the Local Planning Authority. Kirby Hill RAMS opposes the application. Kirby Hill is Britain's longest-running proposed motorway services controversy.

== Schools ==
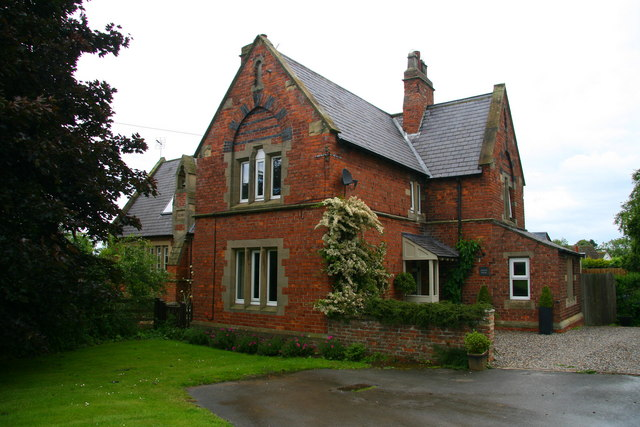
Kirby Hill's former school, built in 1867 and now a private house

Kirby Hill Church of England Primary School has a modern school building, opened in June 2002. The old school near the Vicarage was built in 1867.

For secondary education the parish is in the catchment area of Boroughbridge High School and Ripon Grammar School.

== Notable people ==
- Mary Fisher (1884–1972), first woman mayor of Harrogate, North Yorkshire.

== Governance ==
Kirby Hill and District Parish Council has eight members. From 1974 to 2023 it was part of the Borough of Harrogate, it is now administered by the unitary North Yorkshire Council. The village is part of the Skipton and Ripon constituency of the UK Parliament.

== See also ==
- Listed buildings in Kirby Hill, Harrogate

== Bibliography ==
- Bulmer (2002) [1890]. Bulmer's Topography, History and Directory (Private and Commercial) of North Yorkshire. S&N Publishing. p. 733. ISBN 1-86150-299-0.
- Lang, James (2002). Corpus of Anglo-Saxon Stone Sculpture. London: Oxford University Press for the British Academy. ISBN 978-0197262566.
- Page, William, ed. (1914). "Kirkby Hill or Kirkby on the Moor". A History of the County of York North Riding. Victoria County History. Vol. I. London: Constable & Co. pp. 367–371.
- Pevsner, Nikolaus (1966). Yorkshire: the North Riding. The Buildings of England. Harmondsworth: Penguin Books. p. 210. ISBN 0-14-071029-9.
