= Carthorpe =

Village and civil parish in North Yorkshire, England

Coordinates: 54°14′56″N 1°31′42″W

- Location within North Yorkshire
- Population: 258 (Including Swainby with Allerthorpe. 2011 census)
- OS grid reference: SE309838
- Unitary authority: North Yorkshire
- Ceremonial county: North Yorkshire
- Region: Yorkshire and the Humber
- Country: England
- Sovereign state: United Kingdom
- Post town: Bedale
- Postcode district: DL8
- Police: North Yorkshire
- Fire: North Yorkshire
- Ambulance: Yorkshire

Carthorpe is a small village and civil parish in North Yorkshire, England. It is located about 4 miles (6.4 km) south of Bedale.

From 1974 to 2023 it was part of the Hambleton District, it is now administered by the unitary North Yorkshire Council.

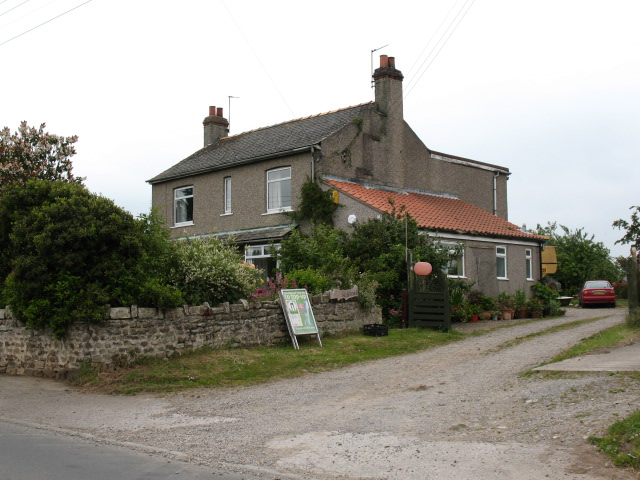
Carthorpe post office

Village services include a pub (the Fox and Hounds Inn), a post office and a Community Hall.

Camp Hill House, a country house with a substantial estate, lies in the village.

== See also ==
- Listed buildings in Carthorpe
