= Sutton Howgrave =

Village and civil parish in North Yorkshire, England

Coordinates: 54.2025°N 1.5187°W

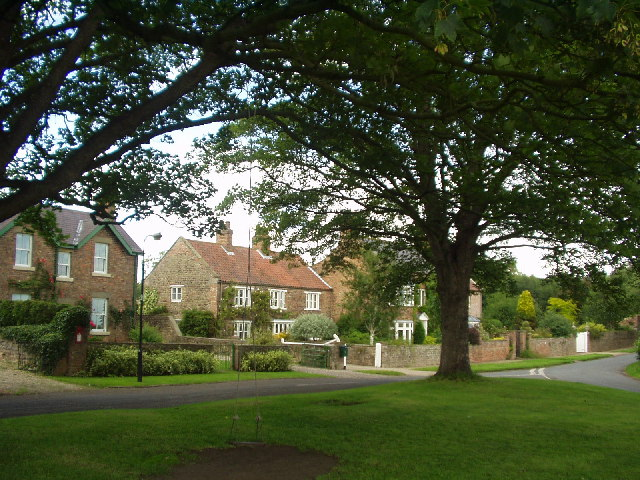
- Village Green and Houses in Sutton Howgrave

- Location within North Yorkshire
- Population: 70
- OS grid reference: SE317791
- Civil parish: Sutton with Howgrave
- Unitary authority: North Yorkshire
- Ceremonial county: North Yorkshire
- Region: Yorkshire and the Humber
- Country: England
- Sovereign state: United Kingdom
- Post town: BEDALE
- Postcode district: DL8
- Police: North Yorkshire
- Fire: North Yorkshire
- Ambulance: Yorkshire

Sutton Howgrave is a village in North Yorkshire, England. It is the only village in the civil parish of Sutton with Howgrave. The population of the parish was estimated at 70 in 2014.

Sutton Howgrave was mentioned in the Domesday Book (as Sudtone) and in the Middle Ages it was a manor in the parish of Kirklington in the North Riding of Yorkshire. It remained a township of Kirklington until 1866, when it became a separate civil parish, now known as Sutton with Howgrave.

Despite its name, the parish of Sutton with Howgrave does not include all of Howgrave, which is a separate civil parish.

The civil parish of Sutton with Howgrave was part of the Hambleton District from 1974 to 2023, it is now administered by the unitary North Yorkshire Council. Since 1978 it has shared the grouped parish council of Kirklington with Sutton Howgrave with the parishes of Kirklington-cum-Upsland and Howgrave.
