= Listed buildings in Great Ouseburn =

Great Ouseburn is a civil parish in the county of North Yorkshire, England. It contains 20 listed buildings that are recorded in the National Heritage List for England. Of these, one is listed at Grade II*, the middle of the three grades, and the others are at Grade II, the lowest grade. The parish contains the village of Great Ouseburn and the surrounding countryside. Most of the listed buildings are houses and associated structures, and the others include a church and associated structures, a toll bridge, a boundary stone and a milestone.

== Key ==
Grade	Criteria
II*	Particularly important buildings of more than special interest
II	Buildings of national importance and special interest

== Buildings ==
Name and location	Photograph	Date	Notes	Grade
St Mary's Church; 54.05005°N 1.31559°W		12th century	The church has been altered and extended throughout the centuries, the nave and aisles were rebuilt in 1820, and in 1883 Paley and Austin added a chapel and carried out some restoration. The church is built in stone, the vestry is in sandstone and brick, and the roof has stone slates. It consists of a nave, north and south aisles, a chancel with a north vestry and a south chapel, and a west tower. The tower has three stages, a chamfered plinth, a lancet window and slit lights, a west clock face, a chamfered string course, bell openings with paired round-headed lights and pierced shutters, an embattled parapet with crocketed corner pinnacles, and a pyramidal roof.	II*
Wingate Cottage; 54.04833°N 1.31314°W	—	Early 17th century (probable)	The house is timber framed and encased in orange-red brick, with a floor band, a dentilled eaves band and a pantile roof. There are two storeys and four bays. The windows are a mix of small-pane casements, and horizontally-sliding sashes.	II
Yeoman's Cottage; 54.04862°N 1.31367°W		1637	The house is timber framed, rendered on the front, encased in pink-brown brick, and it has a pantile roof. There are two storeys and four bays. On the front is a projecting gabled porch, above which is a datestone. The windows are small-pane horizontally-sliding sashes. Inside, there is exposed timber framing.	II
Manor House; 54.05040°N 1.31717°W		17th century	The house, which has been restored, is in brick on a plinth, and has a pantile roof with coped gables and moulded front kneelers. There are two storeys and seven bays, and a rear wing with a dentilled cornice. The doorway has pilasters and a cornice, and the door has geometrical decoration. Above it is a round window with a decorative surround, and the other windows are modern.	II
Prospect Farm House; 54.05055°N 1.31656°W	—	c. 1700	The house, which probably has a timber framed core, is in orange mottled brick, with a floor band, an eaves band, and a pantile roof with tumbled brick gables. There are two storeys and three bays. The central doorway has a gabled canopy, and the windows are small-paned casements.	II
Well Farm House; 54.05107°N 1.31789°W		Late 17th or early 18th century	The house is timber framed with red brick infill, and has a pantile roof. It was altered, and the front was rebuilt in about 1970. There are two storeys, four bays, and an extension on the right containing a porch. On the front, the windows are three-light small-paned casements with brick sills. Inside, there is exposed timber framing.	II
Aldwark Bridge; 54.05348°N 1.28816°W		Mid 18th century	A toll bridge carrying Boat Lane over the River Ure, it is iron-framed with timber decking, and has one brick arch on a sandstone cutwater. The flood arches are in red brick with sandstone dressings, and the abutment walls and piers are in red brick and sandstone. There are four flat spans on tall columns flanked by semicircular brick arches between pilaster piers with round-arched recessed panels.	II
Wall northwest of Church Hill Farm House; 54.04993°N 1.31521°W	—	18th century or earlier	The garden wall is in cobble with some brick, rendered in places, with brick pilaster piers, and flat sandstone coping. It is of varying height, and is ramped up in places.	II
Column south of The Bungalow; 54.04936°N 1.33579°W		18th century	A monumental milestone in sandstone, consisting of a Tuscan column on two square steps. Inserted into the column is a cubic block inscribed on all four faces.	II
The Poplars; 54.05548°N 1.32984°W		Mid 18th century	The house is in red brick, with a floor band, a dentilled eaves band, and a pantile roof with tumbled brick gables. There are two storeys and three bays. The central doorway and the windows, which are sashes, have cambered heads. In the left return are horizontally-sliding sash windows.	II
Walnut Farm House; 54.05069°N 1.31683°W	—	Mid 18th century	The house, which probably has a timber framed core, is in orange-red brick, with a floor band, and a pantile roof with coped gables. There are two storeys and three bays. The doorway has a gabled porch, it is flanked by sash windows, to the left is a horizontally-sliding sash window, and in the upper floor are cross windows.	II
Cedar Croft; 54.04973°N 1.31575°W		Late 18th century	The house is rendered and colourwashed, and has a pantile roof. There are two storeys and four bays, and a later rear extension. The doorway has a patterned radial fanlight, the windows are sashes, and there is an inserted window in the upper floor. All the original openings have channelled wedge lintels with keystones.	II
Church Hill Farm House; 54.04976°N 1.31527°W	—	Late 18th century	The house is rendered and colourwashed, with a fasciated eaves band, and a pantile roof. There are two storeys and four bays. The doorway is recessed, and has fluted pilasters, a radial fanlight, and a cornice hood on consoles. The windows on the front are sashes, and in each gable end is a round-headed window.	II
Rosecroft, wall, gate and railings 54.04916°N 1.31486°W		Late 18th century	The house is rendered and colourwashed, with a floor band, a dentilled eaves band and a slate roof. There are two storeys and three bays. The central doorway has a fanlight, the window above it is blocked, and the other windows are sashes. The front garden wall is in red brick with chamfered stone coping, and the gates and railings are in cast iron. The gate posts incorporate a sunflower motif.	II
Springfield Farm House; 54.05102°N 1.31848°W		Late 18th century	The house is in orange brick,rendered and whitewashed at the front, with a raised dentilled eaves band and a pantile roof. There are two storeys and five bays. The windows are sashes, one horizontally-sliding, and there is an inserted small-pane window.	II
Churchyard walls and cross, St Mary's Church; 54.04998°N 1.31580°W		18th or early 19th century	Flanking the entrance to the churchyard, the walls are in red brick with flat sandstone coping, ramped up to square gate piers with pyramidal caps. Extending to the right, and enclosing the churchyard, the wall is in cobble with cambered coping. About 10 metres (33 ft) to the right of the entrance, inserted into the wall, is part of a medieval cross, consisting of a section of an octagonal shaft in a square socket stone.	II
Church Hill Cottage; 54.04962°N 1.31513°W	—	Early 19th century	The house is rendered and colourwashed, and has a pantile roof. There are two storeys and two bays. The doorway has a blocked patterned fanlight, and the windows are sashes with cambered heads.	II
Boundary Stone; 54.04381°N 1.33126°W	—	19th century	The boundary stone is on the west side of the B6265 road. It is in gritstone and has a triangular plan. On the top are incised initials.	II
Milestone; 54.04804°N 1.33508°W		19th century	The milestone is on the east side of the B6265 road. It is in gritstone and has a triangular plan and a sloping top. The cast iron directaion plates are missing.	II
Holly Cottage, wall, gate and railings 54.05063°N 1.31749°W	—	Undated	The house is in mottled plum brick, with a raised eaves band, scrolled angle brackets and a slate roof. There are two storeys and two bays. In the left bay is a segmental carriage each, and to its right is a recessed doorway with panelled reveals, a patterned fanlight and a cornice. Further to the right is a canted bay window, and the upper floor contains sash windows. The garden wall is in brick with sloped stone coping, and the railings, gates and gate posts are in cast iron.	II
