= Sandbanks Ferry =

Chain ferry in Dorset, England

Coordinates: 50°40′57.20″N 01°56′56.95″W

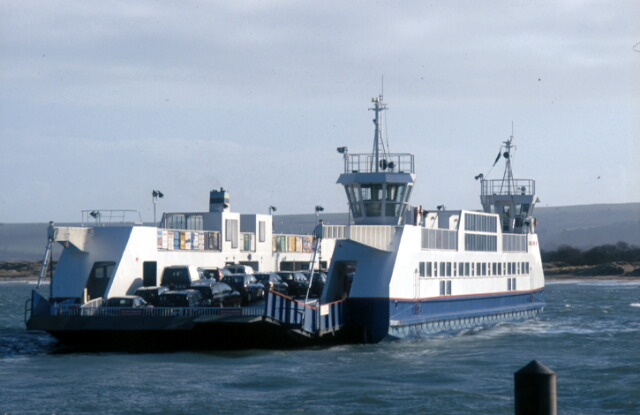
- Sandbanks Ferry in March 2003
- Transit type: Chain ferry
- Carries: 48 cars
- Operator: Bournemouth - Swanage Motor Road and Ferry Company
- Frequency: Every 20 minutes
- No. of vessels: 1 (Bramble Bush Bay)

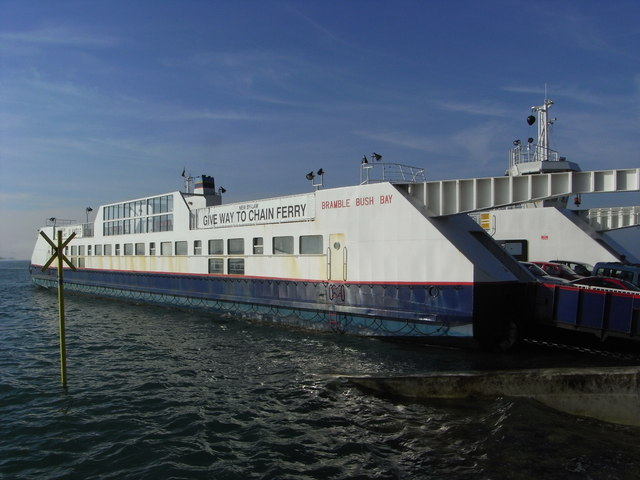
Arriving at Sandbanks Ferry Terminal in Poole in February 2008

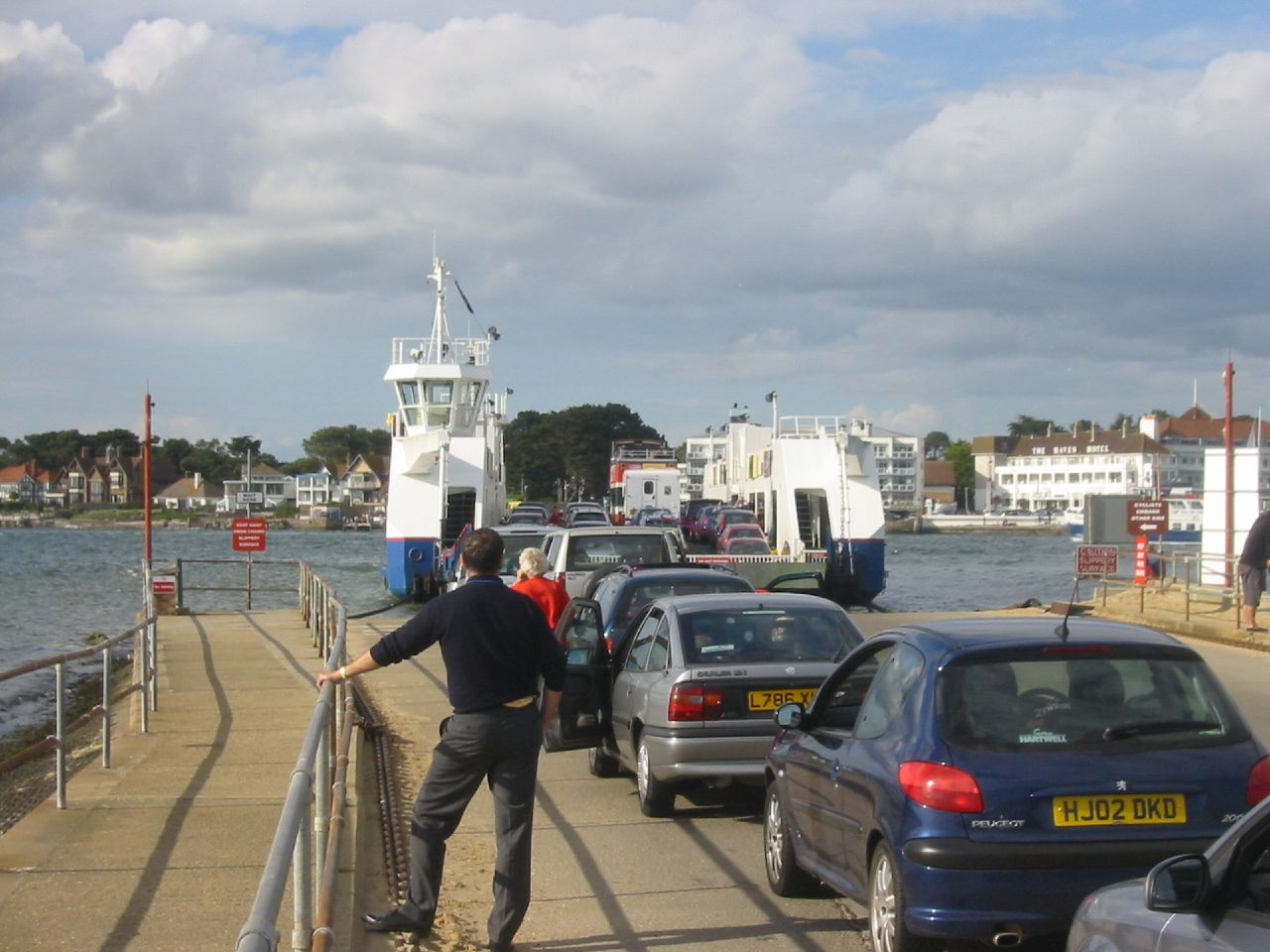
Sandbanks Ferry, looking towards Sandbanks

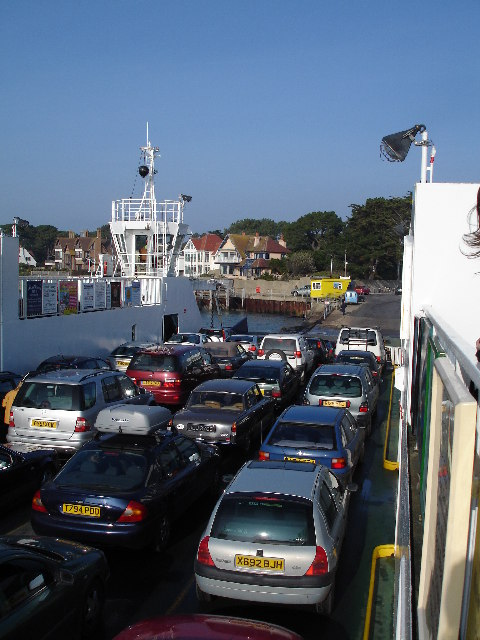
Sandbanks Ferry on the Poole side in February 2006

Bournemouth-Swanage Motor Road and Ferry Act 1923
- Act of Parliament
- Parliament of the United Kingdom
- Long title: An Act to incorporate and confer powers upon the Bournemouth-Swanage Motor Road and Ferry Company and for other purposes.
- Citation: 13 & 14 Geo. 5. c. lxxxviii

Dates
- Royal assent: 31 July 1923

Status: Amended

Text of statute as originally enacted

Bournemouth-Swanage Motor Road and Ferry Act 1928
- Act of Parliament
- Parliament of the United Kingdom
- Long title: An Act to empower the Bournemouth-Swanage Motor Road and Ferry Company to raise additional capital and for other purposes.
- Citation: 18 & 19 Geo. 5. c. viii

Dates
- Royal assent: 10 May 1928

Status: Amended

Text of statute as originally enacted

Bournemouth-Swanage Motor Road and Ferry Act 1956
- Act of Parliament
- Parliament of the United Kingdom
- Long title: An Act to empower the Bournemouth-Swanage Motor Road and Ferry Company to raise additional capital to confer further powers on the Company and for other purposes.
- Citation: 4 & 5 Eliz. 2. c. lxiii

Dates
- Royal assent: 5 July 1956

Status: Amended

Text of statute as originally enacted

Bournemouth-Swanage Motor Road and Ferry Act 1986
- Act of Parliament
- Parliament of the United Kingdom
- Long title: An Act to provide for the motor road of the Bournemouth–Swanage Motor Road and Ferry Company to continue as part of the Company's undertaking; to authorise the Company to execute works; to confer other powers on the Company in relation to their undertaking including powers to raise additional capital; to amend or repeal certain of the local statutory provisions applicable to them; and for other purposes.
- Citation: 1986 c. xvii

Dates
- Royal assent: 25 July 1986

Status: Current legislation

Text of statute as originally enacted

Sandbanks Ferry is a vehicular chain ferry which crosses the entrance of Poole Harbour in the English county of Dorset. The route runs from Sandbanks to Studland and in doing so connects the coastal parts of the towns of Bournemouth and Poole with Swanage and the Isle of Purbeck. This avoids a 25-mile journey by road on a return trip.

The ferry, along with the road that connects with it on the Studland side, is owned by the Bournemouth–Swanage Motor Road and Ferry Company, which initiated the ferry crossing in 1923, and a toll is charged for use of both road and ferry. The current ferry boat, named Bramble Bush Bay, was put into service in 1994 and can carry up to 48 cars. It is the fourth vessel to operate on the route.

The entrance to Poole Harbour is a particularly busy waterway, used by many private and leisure craft along with commercial vessels including large ferries serving routes to France. This often affects the ability of the ferry to maintain its nominal 20 minute frequency. Morebus cross the ferry frequently throughout the day, on route 50 from Bournemouth to Swanage.

== Operation ==
Bournemouth-Swanage Motor Road and Ferry (Revision of Tolls) Order 2025
- Statutory Instrument
- Parliament of the United Kingdom
- Citation: SI 2025/1288

Dates
- Made: 9 December 2025
- Commencement: 30 December 2025
Other legislation
| Repeals/revokes | Bournemouth-Swanage Motor Road and Ferry (Revision of Tolls) (Amendment) Order 2021 |
| Made under | Transport Charges &c. (Miscellaneous Provisions) Act 1954; Bournemouth-Swanage Motor Road and Ferry Act 1956; Bournemouth-Swanage Motor Road and Ferry Act 1986 |
| Revoked by | Bournemouth-Swanage Motor Road and Ferry (Revision of Tolls) Order 2025 |

Status: Current legislation

Text of statute as originally enacted

Bournemouth-Swanage Motor Road and Ferry (Revision of Tolls) (Amendment) Order 2021
- Statutory Instrument
- Parliament of the United Kingdom
- Citation: SI 2021/854

Dates
- Made: 14 July 2021
- Commencement: 1 August 2021
Other legislation
| Repeals/revokes | Bournemouth-Swanage Motor Road and Ferry (Revision of Tolls) Order 2021 |
| Made under | Transport Charges &c. (Miscellaneous Provisions) Act 1954; Bournemouth-Swanage Motor Road and Ferry Act 1956; Bournemouth-Swanage Motor Road and Ferry Act 1986 |
| Revoked by | Bournemouth-Swanage Motor Road and Ferry (Revision of Tolls) (Amendment) Order 2021 |

Status: Revoked

Text of statute as originally enacted

Bournemouth-Swanage Motor Road and Ferry (Revision of Tolls) Order 2021
- Statutory Instrument
- Parliament of the United Kingdom
- Citation: SI 2021/587

Dates
- Made: 11 May 2021
- Commencement: 17 May 2021
Other legislation
| Repeals/revokes | Bournemouth-Swanage Motor Road and Ferry (Revision of Tolls) Order 2015 |
| Made under | Transport Charges &c. (Miscellaneous Provisions) Act 1954; Bournemouth-Swanage Motor Road and Ferry Act 1956; Bournemouth-Swanage Motor Road and Ferry Act 1986 |

Status: Revoked

Text of statute as originally enacted

Bournemouth-Swanage Motor Road and Ferry (Revision of Tolls) Order 2015
- Statutory Instrument
- Parliament of the United Kingdom
- Citation: SI 2015/1105

Dates
- Made: 23 February 2015
- Commencement: 2 March 2015
Other legislation
| Repeals/revokes | Bournemouth-Swanage Motor Road and Ferry (Revision of Tolls) Order 2009 |
| Made under | Transport Charges &c. (Miscellaneous Provisions) Act 1954; Bournemouth-Swanage Motor Road and Ferry Act 1956; Bournemouth-Swanage Motor Road and Ferry Act 1986 |
| Revoked by | Bournemouth-Swanage Motor Road and Ferry (Revision of Tolls) Order 2021 |

Status: Revoked

Text of statute as originally enacted

The ferry operates from 7 am until 11 pm 364 days per year, and 8 am until 6 pm on Christmas Day. The normal service sees a departure every 20 minutes from each terminal, however a shuttle service operates at busy times to clear the queues. The service operates as normal in the vast majority of weathers, but very occasionally the service is suspended during exceptionally severe storms, due to mechanical problems, or when large heath fires break out near to its southern terminal. A refit occurs once every two years, usually suspending service for a fortnight in November.

Vehicle tolls are paid online up to 30 days before or by midnight after the crossing using an Automatic number-plate recognition system introduced on 1 July 2026 although the ferry already went cashless on 1 April 2026. Pedestrian and cyclist tolls are also cashless but are collected onsite. Previously there were tollbooths on the Studland side for vehicles.

== Incidents ==
There have been several incidents involving its passage across the harbour entrance.

On 29 August 1976 a 14-foot (4.3 m) sailing dinghy was driven into the side of the ferry by the outgoing tidal run following an engine failure. Although two of the occupants were pulled to safety the third occupant, a sixteen-year-old girl was pulled under the ferry by the current. She freed herself from the boat before become trapped under the ferry in an air pocket; her father – one of the dinghy crew – went back into the water and pulled her out.

In 1986, a bus on the local Wilts and Dorset route from Bournemouth to Swanage ran away down the ramp into the sea. It had to be pinned to the ferry to prevent it drifting and becoming a hazard to navigation. There were no casualties in the incident.

In 1996, one of the chains was broken by the Barfleur, a ferry operated by Brittany Ferries between Poole and Cherbourg.

On 6 May 2001, four 21-foot (6.4 m) XOD racing dinghies taking part in a race were pushed into the ferry by strong currents and an ebb tide. One of the boats was sucked under the ferry; two crew members were pulled from the water after attempting to climb on to the ferry but a 72-year-old woman went under with the boat and was rescued after resurfacing on the other side.

On 16 June 2006, a yacht – the Flying Monkey – sustained severe damage to its mast and sails after a collision with the ferry. Because of the tide, the crew were unable to avoid both the chain ferry and a Condor commercial ferry which were approaching. The two men on board were able to board the chain ferry and the yacht was disentangled.

On 1 June 2007 a small motorboat collided with the ferry and was pinned to the side by the current, reportedly after having run out of fuel and drifting into its path. Its two occupants were safely rescued by the RNLI.

On 21 April 2009, a car rolled from the slipway, into the sea, while waiting for the ferry at the Sandbanks terminal. The car was not occupied at the time.

On 25 May 2012, the RNLI rescued two individuals, one of whom was clinging to the outside of the ferry. Their small motorboat had suffered engine failure placing the occupants at risk of being pulled under the chain ferry.

On 16 July 2014, the ferry was forced to stop crossing for two days as one of its chains was again broken by the Barfleur which passed fast and close to the moored Bramble Bush Bay at a very low tide. The resulting movement of the smaller vessel lifted the chain into the propellers and rudders of the Barfleur, which were also slightly damaged.

== 2019/20 service withdrawals ==
On 12 July 2019, the ferry service was withdrawn due to mechanical issues. Initially the date for restoration of service was given as 12 August, but discovery of a broken drive shaft resulted in the ferry being taken out of service for major repairs at a shipyard near Southampton. The ferry remained out of service until 31 October 2019, with significant impact on travel and businesses in the area.

There was further withdrawal of service during the COVID-19 pandemic lockdown. A limited service was provided for essential travel from 23 March 2020 but this was withdrawn from 21 April. The suspension was used to carry out refit works, avoiding the need for work to be done in November 2020. Service was restored on 17 June.

== Vessels ==
The ferry company has operated four ferries (technically classified as floating bridges) since operations commenced.

Ferries of the Bournemouth-Swanage Motor Road and Ferry Company
| Number | Name | Type | Builder | In service | Car capacity | Notes |
|---|---|---|---|---|---|---|
| No 1 | None | Steam, Compound vertical direct acting surface condensing, 2 x horizontal boilers working at 100 psi. | J. Samuel White & Co Ltd (Isle of Wight) | 1926–1958 | 15 (later modified to 18) | New in 1926. Remained the primary vessel even after No 2 entered service. Withdrawn. |
| No 2 | None | Steam, Compound vertical direct acting surface condensing, horizontal boiler. | J. Samuel White & Co Ltd (Isle of Wight) | 1952–1958 | 8 | Built 1925 for Cowes Chain Ferry. Temporarily at Sandbanks during the Second World War. Permanently from 1952. Withdrawn. |
| No 3 | None | Diesel-electric, 3 x Ruston 6VPHZ 6 cylinder 120BHP engines, 3 x Metropolitan Vickers 46KW generators. | J. Bolson & Son Ltd (Poole, Dorset) | 1958–1994 | 28 | New in 1958. First Sandbanks Ferry to carry a million passengers in one year. Converted into a floating oyster processing and seeding unit, moored in Poole Harbour near the north shore of Brownsea Island. |
| No 4 | Bramble Bush Bay | Diesel-hydraulic, 3 x Cummins NT85594 engines. | Richard Dunston Ltd (Hessle, Yorkshire) | 1994–present | 48 (permitted); 52 (physical capacity) | New in 1994. Final vessel constructed by Dunston's before bankruptcy. |

== In fiction ==
The ferry, nicknamed Chug because of the sound of the chains passing through the ship's drive mechanism, is the hero of a children's book of the same name. In the story, Chug rescues a larger ferry which requires him to break free from his chains. Sales of the book benefit Swanage RNLI Station.
