= Aldwark Bridge =

Bridge in North Yorkshire, England

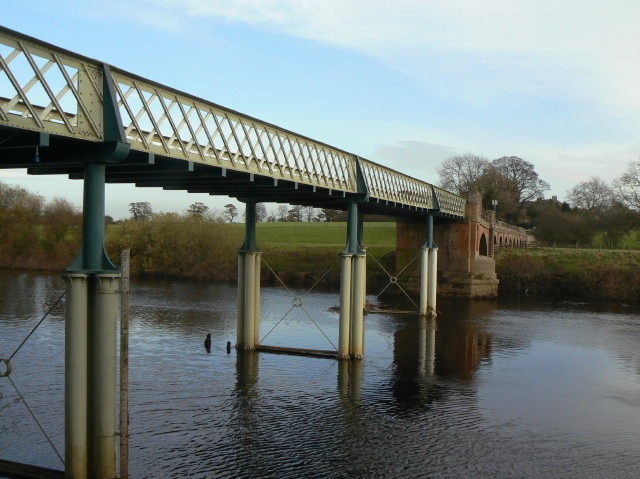
- Section of the bridge in 2009
- Coordinates: 54.053442°N 1.288031°W
- OS grid reference: SE 46710 62182
- Carries: Boat Lane
- Crosses: River Ure
- Locale: Little Ouseburn, North Yorkshire
- Heritage status: Grade II

Characteristics
- Material: Stone, iron and wood

History
- Construction end: 1772

Statistics
- Toll: Free for Motorcycles; £1.00 Cars and Vans; £2.00 Cars and Vans with trailer; £2.00 Vehicles over 3.5t

Location
- Interactive map of Aldwark Bridge

Aldwark Bridge Act 1772
- Act of Parliament
- Parliament of Great Britain
- Long title: An Act for building a Bridge cross the River Ure from Great Ouseborn to Aldwork, in the County of York.
- Citation: 12 Geo. 3. c. 87

Dates
- Royal assent: 16 April 1772

Aldwark Bridge is a historic bridge over the River Ure in North Yorkshire, in England.

Until the mid-18th century, a ferry connected the two banks of the river at Aldwark. The ferryman in 1768 was John Thomson, and that year, he rode to London to seek permission to construct a bridge, in exchange for collecting tolls. This was granted in the Aldwark Bridge Act 1772 (12 Geo. 3. c. 87), and the bridge opened in 1772. It originally had brick piers and a wooden deck. In 1848, it was described as "a substantial wooden structure, which crosses the river and its banks by twenty-seven arches and culverts". A local legend claims that it was once damaged by an iceberg. In 1880, the central section of the bridge was destroyed during a flood, and the bridge was largely rebuilt, using an iron frame.

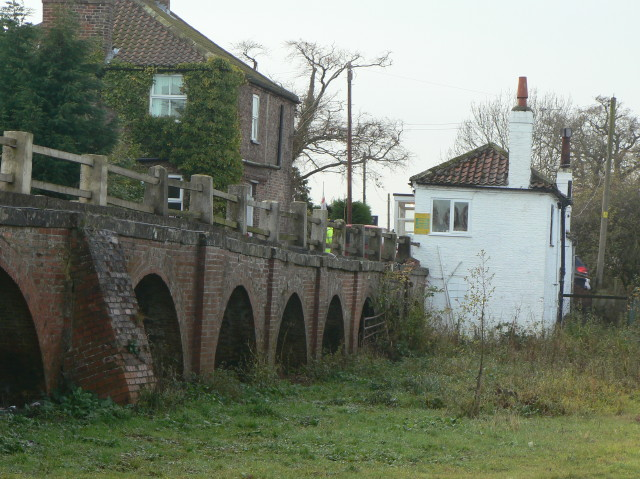
Brick arches over the floodlands, in 2009

By 1962, the bridge was owned by Yorkshire Farmers Ltd. The company offered to sell it to the North Riding of Yorkshire County Council, but the council was uninterested, and it remained in private hands. It remains a toll bridge, thought to be the last one wholly in Yorkshire since the fee for crossing Selby toll bridge was abolished in 1991.

Aldwark Bridge (Revision of Tolls and Traffic Classification) Order 2025
- Statutory Instrument
- Parliament of the United Kingdom
- Citation: SI 2025/975

Dates
- Made: 19 August 2025
- Commencement: 10 September 2025
Other legislation
Repeals/revokes	Aldwark Bridge (Revision of Tolls and Traffic Classification) Order 2005
Made under	Transport Charges &c. (Miscellaneous Provisions) Act 1954

Status: Current legislation

Text of statute as originally enacted

Aldwark Bridge (Revision of Tolls and Traffic Classification) Order 2005
- Statutory Instrument
- Parliament of the United Kingdom
- Citation: SI 2005/2117

Dates
- Made: 14 July 2005
- Commencement: 29 July 2005
Other legislation
Repeals/revokes	Aldwark Bridge (Revision of Tolls and Traffic Classification) Order 1997
Made under	Transport Charges &c. (Miscellaneous Provisions) Act 1954
Revoked by	Aldwark Bridge (Revision of Tolls and Traffic Classification) Order 2025

Status: Revoked

Aldwark Bridge (Revision of Tolls and Traffic Classification) Order 1997
- Statutory Instrument
- Parliament of the United Kingdom
- Citation: SI 1997/303
Other legislation
Made under	Transport Charges &c. (Miscellaneous Provisions) Act 1954
Revoked by	Aldwark Bridge (Revision of Tolls and Traffic Classification) Order 2005

Status: Revoked

The toll can only be increased by permission of the Secretary of State for Transport; it was doubled to one penny in 1980, while in 2005, it rose from 15p to 40p. The bridge was purchased by Alex Bell in 2021. In 2022, permission was refused to increase the toll to 80p. In January 2025, Bell announced his intention to raise the toll from 40p to £1, with a future hike to £1.40 scheduled for 2035. The increase was criticised by local teachers who feared the increased cost would prevent children living on one side of the bridge from attending school on the other side. A public enquiry into the fee increase was held in Easingwold in March 2025, and the increase was agreed and then implemented by the Aldwark Bridge (Revision of Tolls and Traffic Classification) Order 2025 (SI 2025/975).

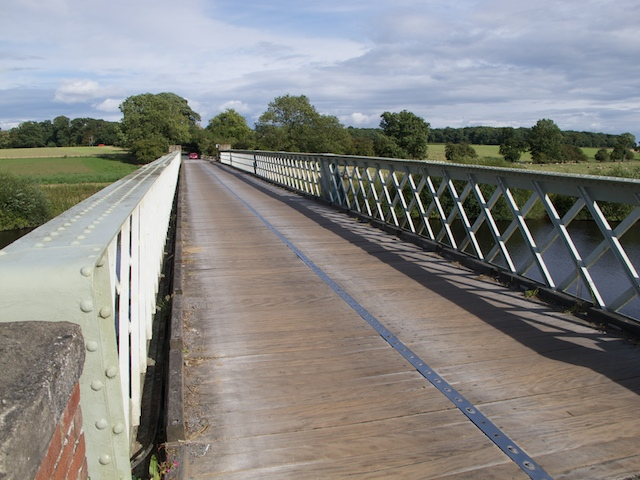
Deck of the bridge, in 2010

The bridge was grade II listed in 1988. The bridge was used by 700,000 vehicles over the course of 1997.

It closed in April 2023 for maintenance. The bridge reopened on 17 February 2024. The cost of the maintenance was variously reported as being £1 million or £700,000.

The bridge has an iron frame and a timber deck, with one brick arch surviving, supported by a sandstone cutwater. There are also surviving brick and sandstone arches over floodlands at the side of the river. The section over the river consists of four spans.

== See also ==
- Listed buildings in Aldwark, Hambleton
- Listed buildings in Great Ouseburn
- List of crossings of the River Ure

Bridges over the River Ure
Upstream: Borough Bridge	Downstream: Skelton Bridge
