= Transport Charges &c. (Miscellaneous Provisions) Act 1954 =

United Kingdom Act of Parliament 1954 c. 64

- Act of Parliament
- Parliament of the United Kingdom
- Long title: An Act to amend the law relating to the charges of certain undertakings connected with transport and to the accounts and returns to be prepared by railway undertakings, being in either case undertakings which do not form part of the undertakings of the British Transport Commission; to revoke in part (with savings) Defence Regulation 56; to provide for the control of the number of passengers to be carried on public service vehicles, tramcars and trolley vehicles; to repeal the Railway Freight Rebates Enactments, 1929 to 1943; and for purposes connected with the matters aforesaid.
- Citation: 2 & 3 Eliz. 2. c. 64

Dates
- Royal assent: 25 November 1954

Status: Partially repealed

Text of statute as originally enacted

Text of the Transport Charges &c. (Miscellaneous Provisions) Act 1954 as in force today (including any amendments) within the United Kingdom, from legislation.gov.uk.

The Transport Charges &c. (Miscellaneous Provisions) Act 1954 (2 & 3 Eliz. 2. c. 64) is an act of the Parliament of the United Kingdom that reformed the statutory regulation of fares, tolls, and other charges levied by independent transport undertakings outside the nationalised British Transport Commission. It received royal assent on 25 November 1954 and entered into full force on 1 January 1955, applying to England, Wales, and Scotland while expressly excluding Northern Ireland.

== Background and legislative history ==
Following the Transport Act 1947 and the Transport Act 1953, charges schemes for nationalised transport services were placed under the jurisdiction of the Transport Tribunal, whereas independent transport operators remained bound by rigid local acts, historical charging schedules, or wartime emergency powers under Defence Regulation 56. During parliamentary debates in July and November 1954, the government—represented in the House of Commons by the Minister of Transport and Civil Aviation, John Boyd-Carpenter, and in the House of Lords by the Earl of Selkirk—advanced the bill to replace temporary wartime controls with permanent statutory mechanisms for adjusting fares and tolls in response to post-war operating costs.

== Key provisions ==
Sections 1 to 5 of the act established procedures for regulating and modifying fares and charges across independent public service vehicle operators, tramway and trolley vehicle undertakings, and independent statutory railway and inland waterway undertakings. Under section 3, charges schemes approved for the British Transport Commission could be extended to qualifying independent railway and inland waterway companies, subject to modifications determined by the Transport Tribunal.

Section 6 created a permanent mechanism enabling the minister (subsequently the Secretary of State) to revise statutory charges—including tolls and dues—levied by independent harbour, inland waterway, ferry, and bridge undertakings upon application by either the operator or a party with a substantial interest. In determining any revision under section 6(3), the minister is statutorily required to consider the undertaking's financial position and future prospects, ensuring that annual revenue is neither substantially less nor substantially more than adequate to cover working, management, and maintenance costs, reasonable reserve contributions, and an appropriate return on investment.

Sections 8 to 11 addressed miscellaneous operational and financial rules across the independent transport sector. Section 8 revoked Defence Regulation 56 in part (with transitional savings) one month after the passing of the act, while section 9 empowered the minister to make regulations controlling the number of standing and seated passengers carried on public service vehicles, tramcars, and trolley vehicles. Section 10 simplified the yearly accounting and statistical return obligations imposed on independent railway undertakings under the Railway Companies (Accounts and Returns) Act 1911 and the Railways Act 1921, and section 11 repealed the Railway Freight Rebates Enactments 1929 to 1943 (Note: The Railway Freight Rebates Enactments 1929 to 1943 were the Local Government Act 1929 (19 & 20 Geo. 5. c. 17), the Railway Freight Rebates Act 1936 (1 Edw. 8 & 1 Geo. 6. c. 2) and the Railway Freight Rebates Act 1943 (6 & 7 Geo. 6. c. 23).) regarding the transmission of rate-relief benefits.

== Subsequent amendments and ongoing use ==
Large parts of the act were subsequently repealed or superseded as transport law was consolidated and deregulated over the late twentieth century, including repeals of harbour provisions by the Harbours Act 1964, public service vehicle fare controls by the Transport Act 1980, and tramway provisions by the Transport and Works Act 1992.

Section 6 remains in active use as the primary statutory mechanism for revising tolls on historic privately or independently operated toll bridges and ferries in Great Britain, including orders made for the Sandbanks Ferry, Whitchurch Bridge, Warburton Toll Bridge, Aldwark Bridge, and Dunham Bridge.
