= St Stephen's Church, Aldwark =

Church in Aldwark, North Yorkshire, England

Coordinates: 54°03′50″N 1°17′14″W

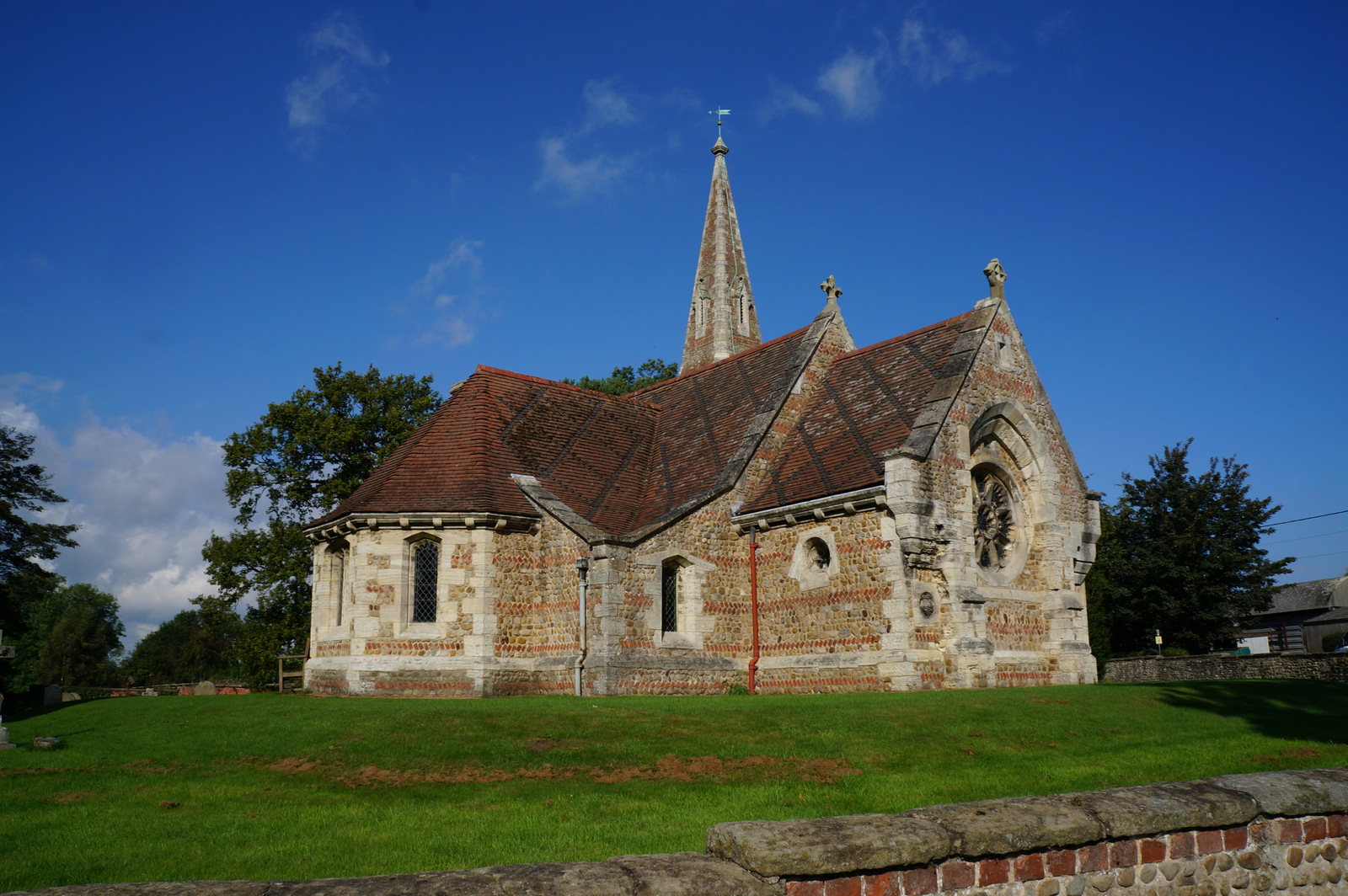
The church, in 2014

St Stephen's Church is the parish church of Aldwark, a village north-west of York, in North Yorkshire in England.

The building was funded by Lady Frankland-Russell and was designed by Edward Buckton Lamb. John Betjeman noted that Lamb had been described as a "rogue architect", but stated that "the plan of the church is unusual yet effective both within and without... the almost detached tower and spire form a composition typical of the architect". The church was constructed between 1846 and 1853. In 1984, the church was Grade II listed.

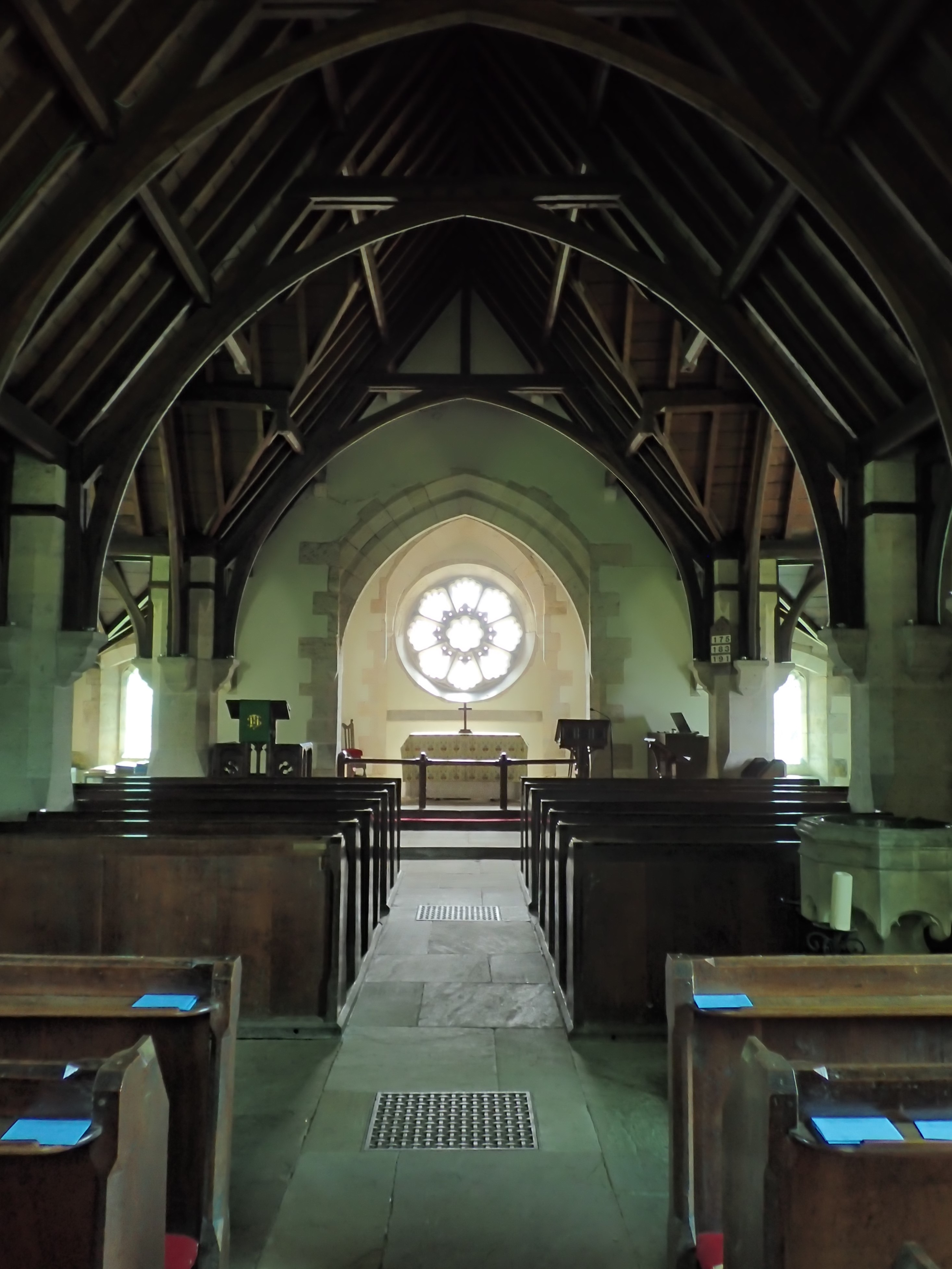
Interior of the church, in 2023

The church is constructed of alternating courses of herringbone brick and cobbles, with sandstone dressings. The roof is tiled, with the diagonals picked out in fishscale tiles. The church consists of a nave, short transepts in apsidal form, and a single-bay chancel. There is a two-stage tower to the north of the nave, supported by angle buttresses, and with a short spire. Inside, there are four stone cross piers, which support a complex wooden roof, based on a king post structure. The west window is in the Perpendicular style, and has glass designed by Charles Eamer Kempe in 1885.

The church forms part of the benefice of Alne, along with St Mary's Church in Alne and St Stephen's Church in Tollerton.

== See also ==
- Listed buildings in Aldwark, Hambleton
