= St Mary the Virgin's Church, Great Ouseburn =

Coordinates: 54.0500°N 1.3156°W

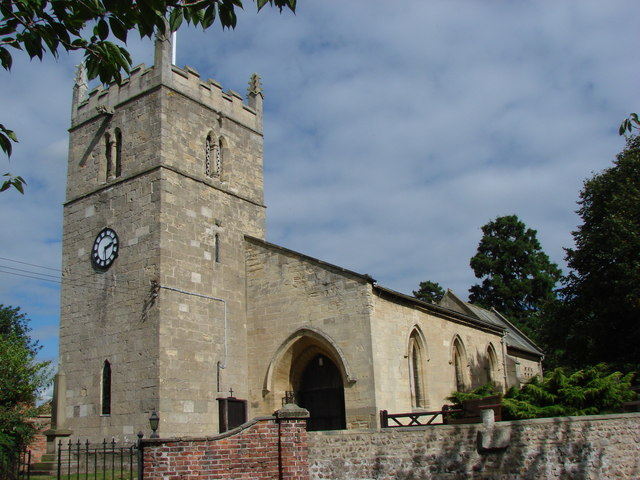
- St Mary the Virgin's Church, Great Ouseburn, from the southwest

- Location in North Yorkshire
- OS grid reference: SE 44912 61782
- Location: Great Ouseburn, North Yorkshire
- Country: England
- Denomination: Anglican

History
- Status: Parish church
- Dedication: Saint Mary the Virgin

Architecture
- Functional status: Active
- Heritage designation: Grade II*
- Designated: 15 March 1966
- Architect: Paley and Austin (South chapel)
- Architectural type: Church
- Style: Norman, Gothic, Gothic Revival

Administration
- Province: York
- Diocese: Leeds
- Archdeaconry: Richmond
- Deanery: Ripon
- Parish: Great Ouseburn

Clergy
- Vicar: Revd. Sarah Feaster

St Mary the Virgin's Church is in the village of Great Ouseburn, North Yorkshire, England. It is an active Anglican parish church in the deanery of Ripon, the archdeaconry of Richmond, and the Diocese of Leeds. Its benefice has been united with those of four local parishes. The church is recorded in the National Heritage List for England as a designated Grade II* listed building.

== History ==
The lower part of the tower dates from the Norman era, the upper part was added in the 13th century, the arcades date from the 14th century, and the chancel from the following century. The vestry and aisles were rebuilt in 1820. In 1883 the Lancaster partnership of Paley and Austin added the south chapel. In 1994 a porch was built. Since then a toilet and kitchenette have been added, and the organ has been moved; moving the organ allowed the chapel to be restored.

== Architecture ==
=== Exterior ===
The church is constructed in ashlar stone, with the vestry in sandstone and brick, and the roofs in stone slate. Its plan consists of a three-bay nave, north and south aisles, a chancel with a north vestry and a south chapel, and a west tower. The tower is in three stages, standing on a chamfered plinth. On the west side of the bottom stage is a lancet window. There are slit windows on south side in the bottom and middle stages, and a clock face on the west side in the middle stage. The top stage contains round-headed two-light bell openings. The parapet is embattled with crocketed pinnacles. On top of the tower is a pyramidal roof. At the west end of the south aisle is a doorway with a pointed head. Along the walls of the aisles are three two-light windows containing Y-tracery. On the south side of the chapel are a priest's door and a square-headed window containing three lancets. Its east window contains 19th-century Perpendicular-style tracery. In the north and south sides of the chancel are square-headed two-light windows, and the east window is in Perpendicular style.

=== Interior ===
The tower arch is round-headed. The arcades consist of tall, pointed arches carried on slender round columns. On the north wall of the chancel are two monuments by Fisher of York dated 1779 and 1780. The font dates from the 17th century, and its lid from the 19th century. The two-manual organ was installed in the church by Peter Wood and Son. It had originally been built in 1962 by J. W. Walker and Sons for the First Church of Christ, Scientist, Haywards Heath, and was moved to St Mary's in 2000. This replaced a much smaller, single-manual organ, which was built in 1888 by Forster and Andrews, and moved to Japan following the installation of the present organ.

== See also ==
- Grade II* listed churches in North Yorkshire (district)
- Listed buildings in Great Ouseburn
