= Aldwark Manor =

Historic building in North Yorkshire, England

Coordinates: 54.0610°N 1.2836°W

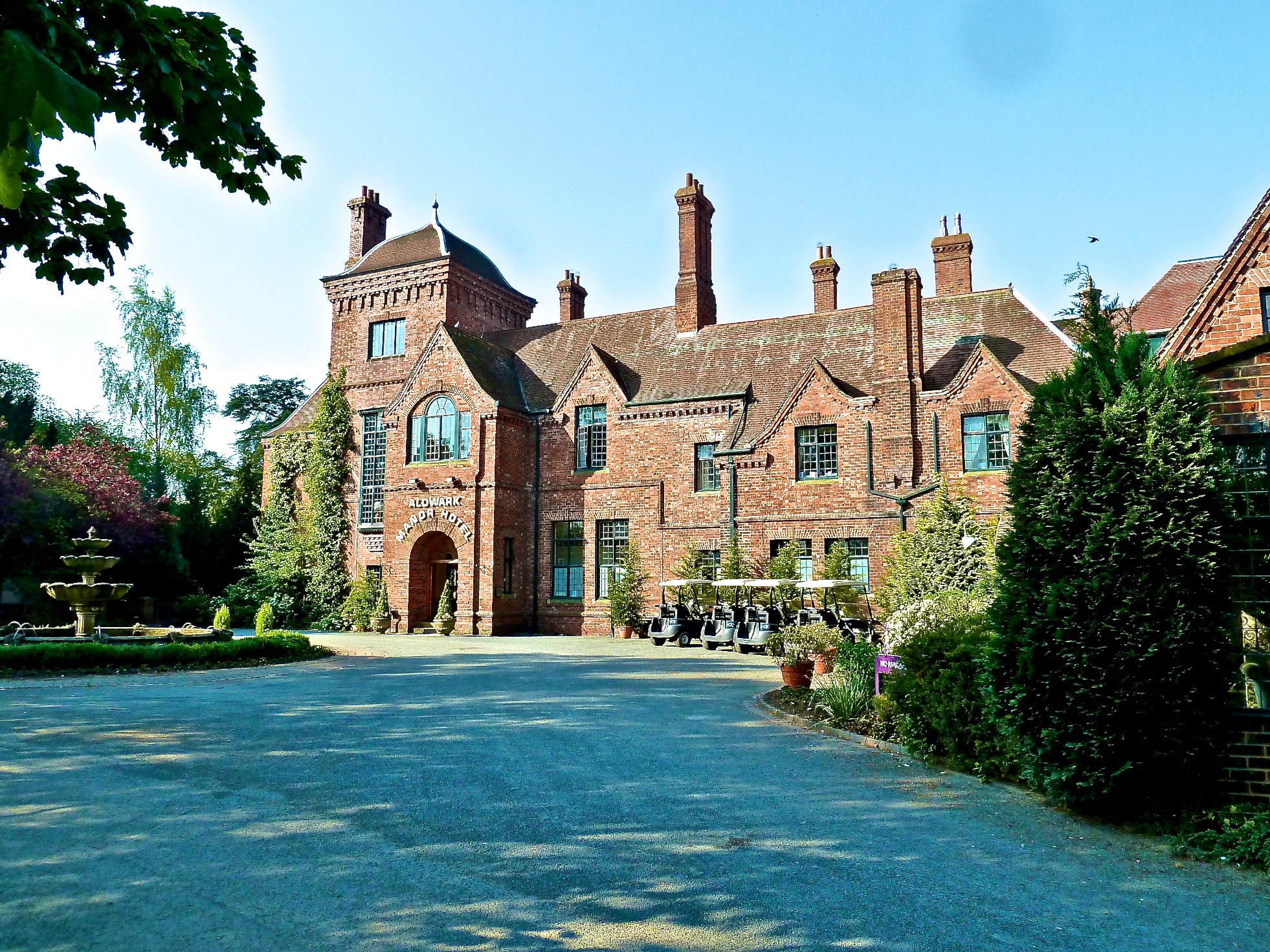
The building, in 2012

Aldwark Manor is a historic building in Aldwark, North Yorkshire, a village in England.

There was a moated manor house on the site from the Mediaeval period, and it was owned by the Frankland family from the late 16th century. It was demolished before 1848, and the estate was tenanted to a farmer, whose house was next to the former building. In 1863, Lady Frankland-Russell commissioned a new house, on a more southerly site, atop Pasture Hill. Around the house, a kitchen garden and two lodges were constructed, and new parkland was laid out. The Frankland family let the house to various tenants until 1949, when they sold it to Kingston upon Hull Council. In 1954, the council opened a school in the building.

The building was converted into a hotel in 1978, with the grounds becoming a golf course. The hotel was later extended, to provide 54 bedrooms. In 2024, a new extension was constructed, providing a new spa and leisure centre, conference and banqueting rooms, and 37 additional bedrooms.
