= Aldwark, Hambleton =

Village and civil parish in North Yorkshire, England

Coordinates: 54°03′58″N 1°17′22″W

Aldwark
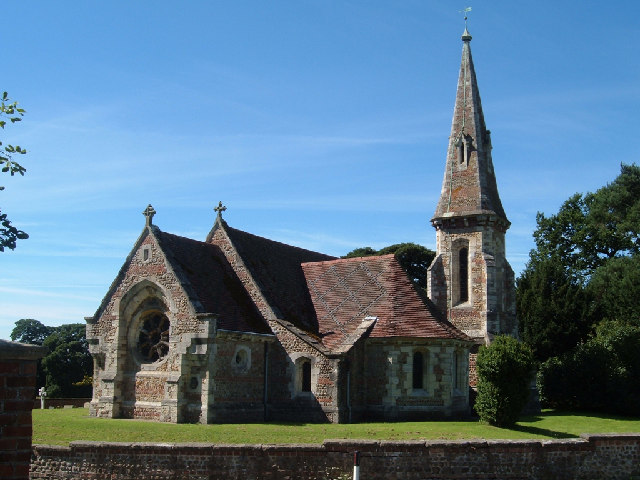
- St Stephen's Church, Aldwark

- Location within North Yorkshire
- Population: 308 (2011 census)
- OS grid reference: SE466634
- Unitary authority: North Yorkshire
- Ceremonial county: North Yorkshire
- Region: Yorkshire and the Humber
- Country: England
- Sovereign state: United Kingdom
- Post town: York
- Postcode district: YO61
- Dialling code: 01347
- Police: North Yorkshire
- Fire: North Yorkshire
- Ambulance: Yorkshire
- UK Parliament: Thirsk and Malton (UK Parliament constituency)

Aldwark is a village and civil parish in the county of North Yorkshire, England. It is situated on the River Ure, about 14 miles from York. The village lies within a conservation area. At the 2001 census it had a population of 116, increasing to 308 at the 2011 census (and including Flawith and Youlton).

== History ==
The name derives from the Old Saxon, ald weorc, meaning Old Fort and probably refers to the Roman fort guarding the ferry crossing on the old Roman road to York that passed through here. The village is mentioned in the Domesday Book as Adewera and belonged to Ligulf in the Bulford Hundred. It was handed over to Count Robert of Mortain by 1086.

== Governance ==
The village lies within the Thirsk and Malton Parliamentary constituency. From 1974 to 2023 it was part of the Hambleton District, it is now administered by the unitary North Yorkshire Council.

The parish council has been combined with those of Flawith and Youlton to form Aldwark Area Parish. There are five councillors, three of whom represent Aldwark.

== Demography ==
According to the 2001 census, the population was 116 in 50 households. Of these, 31 were detached dwellings and 18 of them were owner occupied. Of the total population, 102 were over 16 years old and 69 were in employment.

At the 2011 census, the population had risen to 308 in 126 dwellings. Of these, 30.5% were aged 45–59.

== Geography ==
The village is located on the east bank of the River Ure and about 2,236 acres in size. The Ure changes its name to the River Ouse further downstream from Aldwark. The soil is primarily sand.

Aldwark Bridge is a toll bridge over the river leading to Great Ouseburn. It costs 40p for cars; more for larger vehicles. It is reputed to have been damaged by an iceberg in the 19th century.

The village has two areas of woodland: Aldwark Wood and Aldwark Bridge Wood to the south of the village.

There is a river monitoring station at Aldwark Bridge. River levels normally range between 0.02 metres (0.79 in) and 3.00 metres (9.84 ft), with the record high level being 5.17 metres (17.0 ft).

== Village amenities ==
The village is the location for the Aldwark Manor Golf Club and Spa Hotel and Rising Sun Fisheries. There is a public house in the village called the Aldwark Arms. Aldwark Scout Activity Centre, operated by Central Yorkshire Scout County, is located next to the Aldwark Toll Bridge on Boat Lane. The village is served by one bus route between Easingwold and York.

== Religion ==
St Stephen's Church, Aldwark, is a quirky design by the Victorian architect Edward Buckton Lamb. It is a Grade II listed building that was consecrated in 1854.

== See also ==
- Listed buildings in Aldwark, Hambleton
