= Listed buildings in Aldwark, Hambleton =

Aldwark is a civil parish in the county of North Yorkshire, England. It contains five listed buildings that are recorded in the National Heritage List for England. All the listed buildings are designated at Grade II, the lowest of the three grades, which is applied to "buildings of national importance and special interest". The parish contains the village of Aldwark and the surrounding countryside, and the listed buildings consist of two farmhouses, a toll bridge, and a church and associated structures.

== Buildings ==
Name and location	Photograph	Date	Notes
Wood Holme Farmhouse; 54.06788°N 1.28801°W		Early to mid 18th century	The farmhouse is in reddish-brown brick, with a floor band, stepped and dentilled eaves, and a swept pantile roof with stone coping and tumbled-in brickwork to the gables. There are two storeys and three bays. The central doorway has an oblong fanlight and a modillion hood, and the windows are sashes in architraves.
Aldwark Bridge; 54.05348°N 1.28816°W		Mid 18th century	A toll bridge carrying Boat Lane over the River Ure, it is iron-framed with timber decking, and has one brick arch on a sandstone cutwater. The flood arches are in red brick with sandstone dressings, and the abutment walls and piers are in red brick and sandstone. There are four flat spans on tall columns flanked by semicircular brick arches between pilaster piers with round-arched recessed panels.
Beechcroft Farm House; 54.06534°N 1.28770°W	—	Late 18th century (probable)	The farmhouse is in pinkish-brown brick, with dentilled eaves, and a swept pantile roof with stone coping and kneelers. There are two storeys and three bays. The central doorway has an oblong fanlight, and the windows are sashes in architraves.
St Stephen's Church; 54.06383°N 1.28733°W		1846–53	The church, designed by E. B. Lamb, is built in alternating courses of red brick and cobbles, with sandstone ashlar dressings and tile roofs. It has a cruciform plan, consisting of a nave, north and south transepts with polygonal apses, a short chancel, and a steeple to the north of the nave. The steeple has a tower with two stages, angle buttresses, stepped and cogged eaves, a bracketed cornice and a spire. Between the tower and the nave is an entrance with a chamfered surround and a four-centred arch. At the east end is a rose window.
Walls and gateposts, St Stephen's Church; 54.06414°N 1.28734°W		c. 1850	The wall enclosing the churchyard has bands of red brick and sand-coloured cobbles with stone coping. The gateposts have bands of red brick, cobbles and stone, and stepped pyramidal caps.
