= Great Ouseburn =

Village and civil parish in North Yorkshire, England

Coordinates: 54°03′04″N 1°19′06″W

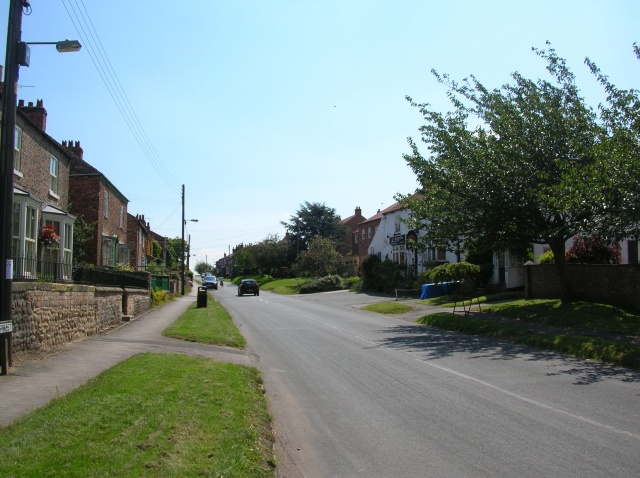
- Great Ouseburn, The Crown public house on the right

- Location within North Yorkshire
- Population: 623 (2021 census)
- OS grid reference: SE447617
  - London: 180 mi (290 km) SSE
- Unitary authority: North Yorkshire
- Ceremonial county: North Yorkshire
- Region: Yorkshire and the Humber
- Country: England
- Sovereign state: United Kingdom
- Post town: York
- Postcode district: YO26
- Police: North Yorkshire
- Fire: North Yorkshire
- Ambulance: Yorkshire

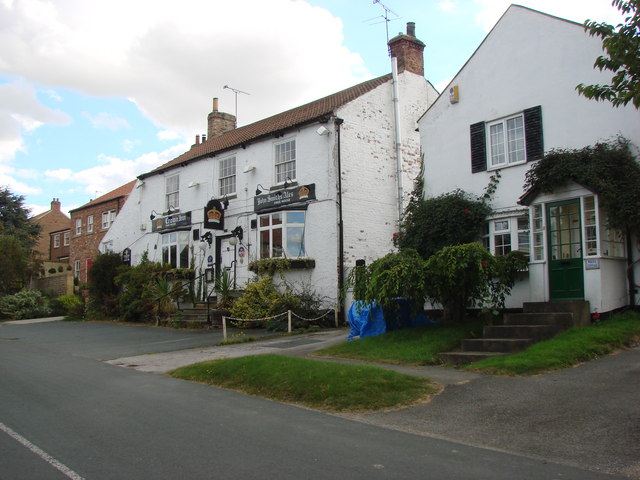
The Crown Inn

Great Ouseburn is a village and civil parish in the county of North Yorkshire, England. It is situated 4 miles (6 km) south-east of Boroughbridge. The village of Aldwark is to the north-east. It had a population of 623 according to the 2021 census.

== History ==
Great Ouseburn and Little Ouseburn both take their name from the River Ouse which begins in the garden of the Great Ouseburn Workhouse. The original source of the Ouse (which is 35 metres away from where it flows now) is marked by a stone column reading "Ouse river head... Ousegill spring Ft. York 13miles Boroughbridge 4miles". The meadows by Ouse Gill Beck have since become a Site of Interest to Nature Conservation (SINC).

Great Ouseburn was originally part of the district of Knaresborough, which was a royal forest in William the Conqueror’s time, giving Great Ouseburn the status of a "forest liberty town"; it had the liberty to punish those people who misbehaved within its boundaries; in the Domesday survey the village is referred to as "Useburne".

The estate, now known as Kirby Hall, was a major influence on the village and was owned by William de Kirkeby in 1200. The estate owned most of the village and the economy of Ouseburn was principally centred on the estate's agricultural business. In 1912 most of the smallholdings were sold to the tenants.

In 1854 Great Ouseburn Community Primary School was established with the laying of the foundation stone by Sir Henry Mesey-Thompson of Kirby Hall and the then Bishop of Ripon.

In the 1870s, Great Ouseburn was described "as a village, a township, a parish, and a district, in W. R. Yorkshire...The township comprises 840 acres. Real property, £2, 781. Pop., 599. Houses, 123."

An important aeroplane crash during the Second World War occurred in Great Ouseburn on 30 April 1942. "De Havilland Flamingo R2764 of 24 Squadron crashed at Great Ouseburn in Yorkshire on 30 April 1942." The plane was carrying two Air Ministry Staff and four high ranking Russians. That morning the plane had travelled from RAF Hendon in London to RAF Tealing near Dundee. It was returning after a short stop at RAF East Fortune near Edinburgh when it developed engine trouble. The plane then caught fire and crashed to the ground in the field just behind Vine House. The Great Ouseburn Fire and Rescue where quickly on the scene, the fire was contained but there were no survivors.

== Governance ==
An electoral ward in the name of Ouseburn exists. This ward stretches south to Moor Monkton with at total population taken at the 2011 census of 3,675.

Until 1974, Ouseburn was part of the West Riding of Yorkshire. Great Ouseburn was an administrative centre; during 1828 it was the headquarters of the Great Ouseburn Gilbert Union comprising 40 parishes. In 1854 it was replaced by the Great Ouseburn Poor Law Union. The Great Ouseburn Union workhouse building was built in 1856-7 and the infirmary was built in 1891. In 1894, the Poor Law Union was replaced by a rural district, also named Great Ouseburn. In 1938, the rural districts were reorganised and it became part of Nidderdale Rural District. In 1974, it became part of the Borough of Harrogate in the newly created county of North Yorkshire. In 2023, the borough was abolished and it is now administered by the unitary North Yorkshire Council.

== Community ==
Great Ouseburn was designated a conservation area on 17 March 1994, the boundary roughly runs from the southern end of the village either side of Main Street up to the village Green.

At present the village is mainly residential. Historic buildings include Rosehurst and Holly Cottage, and former farmhouses such as Church Hill Farm House and Prospect Farm House. Non-residential buildings in the village include the public house, the church, the post office, the school and the village hall. Walnut farm is the only remaining operational farm in the village. New modern residential development at the northern end of the village, such as the properties along the south side of Branton Lane are not characteristic of the locally distinctive properties of the historic buildings in the village.

Annual events in the village include several Open Gardens days, a Village Hall craft fair, School Christmas fair, and a Spring Festival.

== Landmarks ==
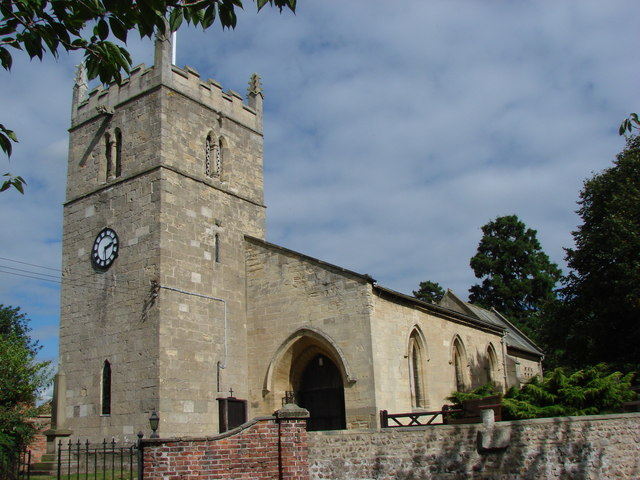
St Mary the Virgin Church

In Great Ouseburn there are 20 buildings or structures that are included on the Statutory List of Buildings of Special Architectural or are of Historic Interest; Grade II*: St Mary's Church; Grade II: The Churchyard walls & Cross, the Garden wall near Church Hill Farmhouse, Well Farm House, Walnut Farm House, Prospect Farm House, Church Hill Farm House, Church Hill Cottage, Yeomans Cottage, Wingate Cottage, Springfield Farm House, Holly Cottage; the house wall and railings, Manor House Garage, Cedar Croft and Rosecroft House and the wall & railings.

St Mary's Church is often argued to be the focal point of the village. The church has a Norman tower with a 13th-century belfry, 14th century arcades, a 3-bay aisled nave rebuilt in 1820 and a 15th-century chancel. The south chapel was constructed in 1883. See 'External links' below for a survey of burials in the churchyard.

== Population ==
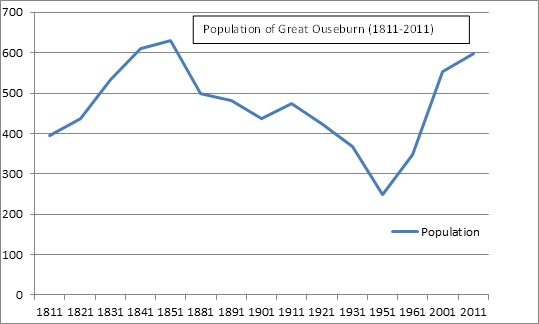
Change in population of Great Ouseburn (1811–2011)

The graph shows that during the period of 1811 to 2011 census data has recorded fluctuations in the population of Great Ouseburn, starting at 395 in 1811 there was a gradual increase in population to 437 in 1821; the population then reached a peak in 1851 with 629 people; remaining in the 5th century for the 70 years the population the decreased to 368 in 1931 and then reached its lowest in 1951 at only 249 people increasing to 347 by 1961. The census undertaken in April 2001 recorded the population of Great Ouseburn at 553 people, this number increased to 598 by the time of the 2011 census taken in March.

Census population of Great Ouseburn parish
Census	Population	Female	Male	Households	Source
2001	553	282	271	233	
2011	598	316	282	251	
2021	623	315	308	259	

== Economy ==
Great Ouseburn's economy was mainly agricultural, but the village was also home to around thirty retail and manufacturing establishments in 1840.

Different employment in Great Ouseburn (2011)

During the first half of the 20th century there were 10 working farms in the village; now only one is left. The former brickyard, steam corn mill, tan yard and malt kilns of the 19th century have all closed down because of the introduction of the car, and advances in the mechanisation of agricultural practices. Today, the post office shop, the Crown Inn, joinery workshop, stonemason, builder's yard and blacksmith are the only trades and occupations that still trade in Great Ouseburn.

The first census in 1801 only divided employment into three categories, those employed in agriculture and those employed in trade or manufacturing; the 1841 census was the first to gather detailed occupational data, although this was in no real order.

The graph uses data from the 2011 census, it shows that wholesale and retail trade (59 people), professional, scientific and technical activities (37 people) and manufacturing (31 people) are the largest employers in the village.
