= List of statutory instruments of the United Kingdom, 2025 =

This is a list of statutory instruments made in the United Kingdom in the year 2025.

== 1–100 ==
Number	Title	Authorities
1	Not Allocated	
2	The Air Navigation (Restriction of Flying) (Old Buckenham, Norfolk) Regulations 2025	Air Navigation Order 2016
3	The Social Security (Miscellaneous Amendments) Regulations 2025	Social Security Contributions and Benefits Act 1992 State Pension Credit Act 2002 Welfare Reform Act 2012
4 (W. 1)	The A458 Trunk Road (Llanfair Caereinion to Llangadfan, Powys) (Temporary Prohibition of Vehicles) Order 2025	Road Traffic Regulation Act 1984
5	The Rent Officers (Housing Benefit and Universal Credit Functions) (Modification) Order 2025	Housing Act 1996
6 (W. 2)	The A487 Trunk Road (Bridge Street, Great Darkgate Street & Owain Glyndwr Square, Aberystwyth, Ceredigion) (Temporary Prohibition of Vehicles) Order 2025	Road Traffic Regulation Act 1984
7 (W. 3)	The A470 Trunk Road (Llangurig, Powys to Mallwyd, Gwynedd) (Temporary Speed Restrictions & No Overtaking) Order 2025	Road Traffic Regulation Act 1984
8	The Council Tax (Demand Notices and Prescribed Classes of Dwellings) (England) (Amendment) Regulations 2025	Local Government Finance Act 1992 Local Government and Public Involvement in Health Act 2007
9	The Ivory Act 2018 (Meaning of “Ivory” and Miscellaneous Amendments) Regulations 2025	Ivory Act 2018
10 (W. 4)	The A470 Trunk Road (Builth Wells to Llangurig, Powys) (Temporary Speed Restrictions & No Overtaking) Order 2025	Road Traffic Regulation Act 1984
11	The Public Lending Right Scheme 1982 (Commencement of Variation) Order 2025	Public Lending Right Act 1979
12	The Lesbian, Gay, Bisexual and Transgender Financial Recognition Scheme (Income Tax Exemption) Regulations 2025	Finance Act 2020
13	The Official Controls (Plant Health) and Phytosanitary Conditions (Amendment) Regulations 2025	Regulation (EU) 2016/2031 of the European Parliament and of the Council on protective measures against pests of plants Regulation (EU) 2017/625 of the European Parliament and of the Council on official controls and other official activities performed to ensure the application of food and feed law, rules on animal health and welfare, plant health and plant protection products
14 (W. 5)	The A48 Trunk Road (Cross Hands Roundabout to Pont Abraham Roundabout, Carmarthenshire) (Temporary Speed Limits and No Overtaking) Order 2025	Road Traffic Regulation Act 1984
15	The Air Navigation (Restriction of Flying) (Wimbledon) Regulations 2025	Air Navigation Order 2016
16 (W. 6)	The Education (Student Finance) (Miscellaneous Amendments) (Wales) Regulations 2025	Teaching and Higher Education Act 1998
17	The Financial Services and Markets Act 2000 (Collective Investment Schemes) (Amendment) Order 2025	Financial Services and Markets Act 2000
18	The Common Organisation of the Markets in Agricultural Products (Marketing Standards and Organic Products) (Transitional Provisions) (Amendment) Regulations 2025	Regulation (EU) No1308/2013 of the European Parliament and of the Council establishing a common organisation of the markets in agricultural products Agriculture Act 2020
19 (W. 7)	The Civil Enforcement of Bus Lane and Moving Traffic Contraventions (County Borough of Merthyr Tydfil) Designation Order 2025	Traffic Management Act 2004
20	The Customs (Safety and Security Procedures) Regulations 2025	Customs and Excise Management Act 1979
21 (W. 8)	The A494 Trunk Road (Rhos Street, Ruthin, Denbighshire) (Temporary Prohibition of Vehicles, Cyclists & Pedestrians) Order 2025	Road Traffic Regulation Act 1984
22	The Financial Services and Markets Act 2000 (Designated Activities) (Supervision and Enforcement) Regulations 2025	Financial Services and Markets Act 2000
23 (W. 9)	The A470 Trunk Road (Powys/Merthyr Tydfil County Boundary to Builth Wells, Powys) (Temporary Speed Restrictions & No Overtaking) Order 2025	Road Traffic Regulation Act 1984
24 (W. 10)	The A44 Trunk Road (Llangurig, Powys to Aberystwyth, Ceredigion) (Temporary Speed Restrictions & No Overtaking) Order 2025	Road Traffic Regulation Act 1984
25	The Contracts for Difference (Miscellaneous Amendments) Regulations 2025	Energy Act 2013
26	The Free Zone (Customs Site No. 1 Forth) Designation Order 2025	Customs and Excise Management Act 1979
27	The Electricity (Individual Exemption from the Requirement for a Transmission Licence) (Dogger Bank A) Order 2025	Electricity Act 1989
28	The Electricity (Individual Exemption from the Requirement for a Transmission Licence) (Seagreen) (Scotland) (Amendment) Order 2025	Electricity Act 1989
29	The Short Selling Regulations 2025	Financial Services and Markets Act 2000 Financial Services and Markets Act 2023
30	The Financial Services and Markets Act 2000 (Ring-fenced Bodies, Core Activities, Excluded Activities and Prohibitions) (Amendment) Order 2025	Financial Services and Markets Act 2000
31 (W. 11)	The A489 Trunk Road (Newtown to Caersws, Powys) (Temporary Speed Restrictions & No Overtaking) Order 2025	Road Traffic Regulation Act 1984
32	The Air Navigation (Restriction of Flying) (Aintree) Regulations 2025	Air Navigation Order 2016
33	The Oxfordshire (Electoral Changes) Order 2025	Local Democracy, Economic Development and Construction Act 2009
34	The Gloucestershire (Electoral Changes) Order 2025	Local Democracy, Economic Development and Construction Act 2009
35	The Air Navigation (Restriction of Flying) (Durham) Regulations 2025	Air Navigation Order 2016
36	The Firearms (Variation of Fees) Order 2025	Firearms Act 1968 Firearms (Amendment) Act 1988
37	The Town and Country Planning (Northwood Headquarters) Special Development Order 2025	Town and Country Planning Act 1990
38 (W. 12)	The Representation of the People (Electoral Registration without Applications) (Pilot Scheme) (Wales) Regulations 2025	Elections and Elected Bodies (Wales) Act 2024
39	The Council Tax Reduction Schemes (Prescribed Requirements) (England) (Amendment) Regulations 2025	Local Government Finance Act 1992
40	The Air Navigation (Restriction of Flying) (Durham) (No. 2) Regulations 2025	Air Navigation Order 2016
41 (C. 1)	The Neonatal Care (Leave and Pay) Act 2023 (Commencement No. 2) Regulations 2025	
42	The School and Early Years Finance (England) Regulations 2025	
43	The Air Navigation (Restriction of Flying) (Birmingham) Regulations 2025	
44	The Social Security (Income and Capital Disregards) (Amendment) Regulations 2025	
45	The Air Navigation (Restriction of Flying) (Brighton) Regulations 2025	
46	The Air Navigation (Restriction of Flying) (Lincoln) Regulations 2025	
47 (W. 13)	The A470 Trunk Road (Llanrwst, Conwy County Borough) (Temporary Prohibition of Vehicles) Order 2025	
48	The Air Navigation (Restriction of Flying) (Helicopter Flight) Regulations 2025	
49	The Unique Identifiers (Application of Company Law) Regulations 2025	
50	The Registrar (Identity Verification and Authorised Corporate Service Providers) Regulations 2025	
51	The Income Tax (Indexation of Qualifying Care Relief Amounts) Order 2025	
52	The MPs’, Senedd and Assembly Pension Schemes (Tax) Regulations 2025	
53	The Income Tax (Indexation of Blind Person’s Allowance and Married Couple’s Allowance) Order 2025	
54 (W. 14)	The Land Transaction Tax (Modification of Special Tax Sites Relief) (Wales) Regulations 2025	
55 (W. 15)	The A489 Trunk Road (Cemmaes Road to Machynlleth, Powys) (Temporary Speed Restrictions and No Overtaking) Order 2025	
56	The Air Navigation (Restriction of Flying) (Royal Air Force Lossiemouth) Regulations 2025	
57 (C. 2)	The Leasehold and Freehold Reform Act 2024 (Commencement No. 2 and Transitional Provision) Regulations 2025	
58 (W. 16)	The M4 Motorway (Junction 23a (Magor), Monmouthshire to Junction 34 (Miskin), Rhondda Cynon Taf) & the A48(M) Motorway (Junction 29 (Castleton), Newport to Junction 29A (St Mellons), Cardiff) (Temporary Prohibition of Vehicles) Order 2025	
59 (W. 17)	The Council Tax Reduction Schemes (Prescribed Requirements and Default Scheme) (Miscellaneous Amendments) (Wales) Regulations 2025	
60 (L. 1)	The Criminal Procedure (Amendment) Rules 2025	
61	The Air Navigation (Restriction of Flying) (Birmingham) (Emergency) Regulations 2025	
62	The Free-Range Egg Marketing Standards (Amendment) (England) Regulations 2025	
63	The Data Protection (Charges and Information) (Amendment) Regulations 2025	
64	The Air Navigation (Restriction of Flying) (Dirleton) Regulations 2025	
65	The Air Navigation (Restriction of Flying) (Wishaw) Regulations 2025	
66	The Air Navigation (Restriction of Flying) (Blackpool) Regulations 2025	
67	The Deposit Scheme for Drinks Containers (England and Northern Ireland) Regulations 2025	
68	The Fixed Penalty Offences Order 2025	
69 (W. 18)	The M4 Motorway (Junction 34 (Miskin), Rhondda Cynon Taf to Junction 49 (Pont Abraham), Carmarthenshire) (Temporary Prohibition of Vehicles) Order 2025	
70	The National Security Act 2023 (Consequential Amendment of Primary Legislation) Regulations 2025	
71	The Representation of the People (Northern Ireland) (Amendment) Regulations 2025	
72 (W. 19) (C. 3)	The Environment (Air Quality and Soundscapes) (Wales) Act 2024 (Commencement No. 1) Order 2025	
73	The Police Act 1997 (Authorisations to Interfere with Property: Relevant Offence) Regulations 2025	
74	The Electricity Capacity Mechanism (Amendment) Regulations 2025	
75	The Reporting on Payment Practices and Performance (Amendment) Regulations 2025	
76 (W. 20)	The A4076 & A40 Trunk Roads (Haverfordwest to Milford Haven, Pembrokeshire) (Temporary Traffic Prohibitions & Restrictions) Order 2025	
77 (W. 21)	The A483 Trunk Road (Powys/Carmarthenshire County Boundary to Llanymynech, Powys) (Temporary Speed Restrictions & No Overtaking) Order 2025	
78	The Air Navigation (Restriction of Flying) (Birmingham) (Emergency) (Revocation) Regulations 2025	
79	The Air Navigation (Restriction of Flying) (Ammanford) Regulations 2025	
80	The Air Navigation (Restriction of Flying) (Kincardine) Regulations 2025	
81	The Clean Heat Market Mechanism Regulations 2025	
82	The Retained EU Law (Revocation and Reform) Act 2023 (Consequential Amendments) Regulations 2025	
83	The Silicon Valley Bank UK Limited Compensation Scheme Order 2025	
84	The Income Tax (Additional Information to be included in Returns) Regulations 2025	
85	The Heckington Fen Solar Park Order 2025	
86	The Combined Authorities (Borrowing) and East Midlands Combined County Authority (Borrowing and Functions) (Amendment) Regulations 2025	
87	The Human Medicines (Amendment) (Modular Manufacture and Point of Care) Regulations 2025	
88 (W. 22)	The Bread and Flour (Wales) Regulations 2025	
89	The Data Protection (Law Enforcement) (Adequacy) (Isle of Man) Regulations 2025	
90	The Access to the Countryside (Coastal Margin) (Birkenhead to the Welsh border) Order 2025	
91	The Access to the Countryside (Coastal Margin) (Marsland Mouth to Newquay) Order 2025	
92	The Sea Fisheries (Amendment) (England) Regulations 2025	
93	The Financial Services and Markets Act 2023 (Digital Securities Sandbox) (Amendment) Regulations 2025	
94	The School Organisation (Prescribed Alterations to Maintained Schools) (England) (Amendment) Regulations 2025	
95 (C. 4)	The Victims and Prisoners Act 2024 (Commencement No. 4) Regulations 2025	
96 (C. 5)	The Finance (No. 2) Act 2023, Part 2 (Alcohol Duty) (Appointed Day, Consequential Amendments and Modifications, Revocations, Savings and Transitional Arrangements) Regulations 2025	
97	The Air Navigation (Restriction of Flying) (Helicopter Flight) (No. 2) Regulations 2025	
98	The Air Navigation (Restriction of Flying) (Royal Air Force Coningsby) Regulations 2025	
99 (W. 23)	The Health Services (Provider Selection Regime) (Wales) Regulations 2025	
100	The Greenhouse Gas Emissions Trading Scheme (Amendment) Order 2025	

== 101–200 ==
Number	Title
101 (W. 24)	The Home Loss Payments (Prescribed Amounts) (Wales) Regulations 2025
102	The Official Controls (Amendment) Regulations 2025
103	The Pension Protection Fund and Occupational Pension Schemes (Levy Ceiling) Order 2025
104 (W. 25)	The A40 Trunk Road (Crickhowell, Powys) (Temporary Prohibition of Traffic) Order 2025
105	The Air Navigation (Restriction of Flying) (Stonehenge) Regulations 2025
106 (L. 2)	The Civil Procedure (Amendment) Rules 2025
107	The M6 Toll Motorway (M6 Junction 3a to M6 Junction 11a) (Temporary Prohibition of Traffic) Order 2025
108	The Air Navigation (Restriction of Flying) (Download Festival, Leicestershire) Regulations 2025
109	Not Allocated
110	The Payment and Electronic Money Institution Insolvency (Scotland) (Amendment) Rules 2025
111	The Designation of Special Tax Sites (East Midlands Investment Zone) Regulations 2025
112	The Valuation Tribunal for England (Membership and Transitional Provisions) (Amendment) Regulations 2025
113	The Hull and East Yorkshire Combined Authority Order 2025
114	The Transfer of Undertakings (Protection of Employment) (Transfer of Staff to the Civil Nuclear Police Authority) Regulations 2025
115	The Devon and Torbay Combined County Authority Regulations 2025
116	The West Burton Solar Project Order 2025
117	The Greater Lincolnshire Combined County Authority Regulations 2025
118	The Lancashire Combined County Authority Regulations 2025
119 (W. 26)	The Land Transaction Tax (Modification of Relief for Acquisitions Involving Multiple Dwellings) (Wales) Regulations 2025
120	The Judicial Committee (Cayman Islands) Order 2025
121	The Exempt Charities Order 2025
122	The Chief Regulator of Qualifications and Examinations Order 2025
123	The Carriage by Air (Revision of Limits of Liability under the Montreal Convention) Order 2025
124	The Greenhouse Gas Emissions Trading Scheme (Amendment) (No. 2) Order 2025
125 (W. 27)	The A40 Trunk Road (Gibraltar Tunnels, Monmouth, Monmouthshire) (Temporary Traffic Prohibitions & Restrictions) Order 2025
126 (W. 28)	The RTM Companies (Model Articles) (Wales) (Amendment) Regulations 2025
127	The Excise Duties (Miscellaneous Amendments and Revocations) (Amendment) Regulations 2025
128	The Naval, Military and Air Forces Etc. (Disablement and Death) Service Pensions (Amendment) Order 2025
129	The Thurrock (Electoral Changes) Order 2025
130	The RTM Companies (Model Articles) (England) (Amendment) Regulations 2025
131 (C. 6)	The Leasehold and Freehold Reform Act 2024 (Commencement No. 3) Regulations 2025
132	The Early Years Foundation Stage (Welfare Requirements) (Amendment) Regulations 2025
133	The Communications (Television Licensing) (Amendment) Regulations 2025
134	The Merchant Shipping (Safety of Navigation) (Amendment) Regulations 2025
135	The Scotland Act 1998 (Transfer of Functions to the Scottish Ministers etc.) Order 2025
136 (W. 29)	The National Health Service (Optical Charges and Payments) (Amendment) (Wales) Regulations 2025
137	The Local Authorities (Changes to Years of Ordinary Elections) (England) Order 2025
138	The Motor Vehicles (Driving Licences) (Amendment) Regulations 2025
139 (W. 30)	The A449 & A40 Trunk Roads (Coldra Interchange, Newport to the Wales/England Border, Monmouthshire) (Temporary Traffic Prohibitions & Restrictions) Order 2025
140	The Separation of Waste (England) Regulations 2025
141	The Canterbury (Electoral Changes) Order 2025
142	Not Allocated
143	The Associated British Ports (Immingham Eastern Ro-Ro Terminal) Development Consent (Correction) Order 2025
144	The Social Security (Contributions) (Amendment) Regulations 2025
145	The Sheringham Shoal and Dudgeon Extensions Offshore Wind Farm (Amendment) Order 2025
146	The Shropshire (Electoral Changes) Order 2025
147	The Air Navigation (Restriction of Flying) (Burghfield) (Emergency) (Revocation) Regulations 2025
148	The Maidstone (Electoral Changes) Order 2025
149	The Air Navigation (Restriction of Flying) (Ascot) Regulations 2025
150	The Air Navigation (Restriction of Flying) (Porthcawl) Regulations 2025
151 (W. 31)	The Care and Support (Charging) and (Financial Assessment) (Wales) (Miscellaneous Amendments) Regulations 2025
152 (W. 32)	The Landfill Disposals Tax (Tax Rates) (Wales) (Amendment) Regulations 2025
153 (W. 33)	The A470 Trunk Road (Blaenau Ffestiniog and Llan Ffestiniog, Gwynedd) (Temporary Prohibition of Waiting) Order 2025
154	The Environmental Permitting (Electricity Generating Stations) (Amendment) Regulations 2025
155	The Walsall (Electoral Changes) Order 2025
156	The Air Navigation (Restriction of Flying) (Headcorn) Regulations 2025
157	The Power to Award Degrees etc. (BIMM University Limited) Order 2025
158	The Airports Slot Allocation (Alleviation of Usage Requirements etc.) Regulations 2025
159	The Elections (Policy Development Grants Scheme) Order 2025
160	The Community Radio Order 2025
161 (W. 34)	The A40 Hardwick Roundabout, A40 Hardwick Gyratory and A40, A465 and A4042 Trunk Roads (Abergavenny, Monmouthshire) (Temporary Traffic Prohibitions & Restrictions) Order 2025
162	The Education (Student Fees, Awards and Support) (Amendment) Regulations 2025
163	The Procurement Act 2023 (Consequential and Other Amendments) Regulations 2025
164	The Air Navigation (Restriction of Flying) (Lippitt’s Hill) (Restricted Zone EG R182) Regulations 2025
165	The Associated British Ports (Immingham Green Energy Terminal) Order 2025
166	The Air Navigation (Restriction of Flying) (Husbands Bosworth) (Restricted Zone EG R263) Regulations 2025
167	The Air Navigation (Restriction of Flying) (Carr Gate) (Restricted Zone EG R353) Regulations 2025
168	The Universal Credit (Work-Related Requirements) In Work Pilot Scheme (Extension) Order 2025
169	The Air Navigation (Restriction of Flying) (Almondsbury) (Restricted Zone EG R181) Regulations 2025
170	The Air Navigation (Restriction of Flying) (Sherburn-in-Elmet Air Race) Regulations 2025
171	The Media Act 2024 (Commencement No. 2 and Transitional and Saving Provisions) (Amendment) Regulations 2025
172	The Income and Corporation Taxes (Electronic Communications) (Amendment) Regulations 2025
173 (W. 35)	The A40 Trunk Road (Westbound Carriageway from Raglan to Abergavenny, Monmouthshire) (Temporary Prohibition of Vehicles) Order 2025
174 (W. 36)	The A5 Trunk Road (South of Betws-y-Coed, Conwy) (Temporary Prohibition of Vehicles over 3 Metres Width) Order 2025
175 (C. 7) (W. 37)	The Environment Act 2021 (Commencement No. 2) (Wales) Regulations 2025
176	The Air Navigation (Restriction of Flying) (Fishburn Air Race) Regulations 2025
177	The Air Navigation (Restriction of Flying) (Staffordshire and Derbyshire) Regulations 2025
178	The Air Navigation (Restriction of Flying) (Leicester Air Race) Regulations 2025
179	The Air Navigation (Restriction of Flying) (Enniskillen, County Fermanagh Air Race) Regulations 2025
180	The Non-Domestic Rating (Designated Areas) Regulations 2025
181 (W. 38)	The Procurement (Miscellaneous Amendments) (Wales) Regulations 2025
182 (W. 39)	The Non-Domestic Rating (Multiplier) (Wales) Regulations 2025
183	The Electricity Capacity (Amendment) Regulations 2025
184	The Air Navigation (Restriction of Flying) (Birmingham) (Revocation) Regulations 2025
185	The Veterinary Surgeons and Veterinary Practitioners (Registration) (Amendment) Regulations Order of Council 2025
186	The Air Navigation (Restriction of Flying) (Royal Air Force Cosford) Regulations 2025
187	The Armed Forces (Court Martial) (Amendment) Rules 2025
188	The Armed Forces Pensions (Remediable Service) (Amendment) Regulations 2025
189 (W. 40)	The Free-Range Egg Marketing Standards (Amendment) (Wales) Regulations 2025
190 (W. 41)	The Education (Student Finance) (Fee Limit and Loan Amounts) (Miscellaneous Amendments) (Wales) Regulations 2025
191	The Air Navigation (Restriction of Flying) (Wellesbourne Mountford Air Race) Regulations 2025
192	The Air Navigation (Restriction of Flying) (Royal Portrush, Northern Ireland) Regulations 2025
193 (W. 42)	The Education (Student Finance) (Amounts) (Miscellaneous Amendments) (Wales) Regulations 2025
194 (W. 43)	The A487 Trunk Road (Pembrokeshire/Ceredigion County Boundary near Cardigan, Ceredigion to Dyfi Bridge, Powys) (Temporary Speed Restrictions & No Overtaking) Order 2025
195 (W. 44)	The A40 Trunk Road (Glangrwyney to Pont Wen, Halfway, Powys) (Temporary Speed Restrictions & No Overtaking) Order 2025
196 (W. 45)	The A479 Trunk Road (Glanusk Park to Llyswen, Powys) (Temporary Speed Restrictions & No Overtaking) Order 2025
197 (W. 46)	The A487 Trunk Road (Aberystwyth, Ceredigion) (Temporary Traffic Prohibitions) Order 2025
198	The Port of Southampton Harbour Revision Order 2025
199	The Care and Support (Charging and Assessment of Resources) (Amendment) Regulations 2025
200	The Co-ownership Contractual Schemes (Tax) Regulations 2025

== 201–300 ==
Number	Title
201	The Neonatal Care Leave and Pay (Consequential Amendments to Subordinate Legislation) Regulations 2025
202	The Statutory Neonatal Care Pay (Persons Abroad and Mariners) Regulations 2025
203 (W. 47)	The A470 Trunk Road (Llanelwedd, Powys) (Temporary Prohibition of Vehicles) Order 2025
204	The Energy Bill Relief Scheme and Energy Bills Discount Scheme (Amendment) Regulations 2025
205	The Air Navigation (Restriction of Flying) (Torbay) Regulations 2025
206	The Statutory Neonatal Care Pay (Administration) Regulations 2025
207	The Child Benefit and Guardian's Allowance (Miscellaneous Amendments) Regulations 2025
208	The Whole of Government Accounts (Designation of Bodies) Order 2025
209 (W. 48)	The A5 Trunk Road (Holyhead Road Roundabout, Bangor, Gwynedd to Mona Road Roundabout, Menai Bridge, Anglesey) (Temporary Prohibition of Vehicles and Cyclists) Order 2025
210	The Proscribed Organisations (Name Change) Order 2025
211	The Product Security and Telecommunications Infrastructure (Security Requirements for Relevant Connectable Products) (Amendment) Regulations 2025
212	The Income Tax (Exemption of Scottish Adult Disability Living Allowance) Regulations 2025
213	The Gambling Levy Regulations 2025
214	The Identity and Language (Northern Ireland) Act 2022 (Commencement) Regulations 2025
215	The Gambling Act 2005 (Operating Licence Conditions) (Amendment) Regulations 2025
216	The Unauthorised Co-ownership Alternative Investment Funds (Reserved Investor Fund) Regulations 2025
217	The Movement of Goods (Northern Ireland to Great Britain) (Animals, Feed and Food, Plant Health etc.) (Transitory Provision and Miscellaneous Amendments) Regulations 2025
218	The Armed Forces (Discharge and Transfer to the Reserve Forces) (Amendment) Regulations 2025
219	The Power to Award Degrees etc. (Norland College Limited) Order of Council 2019 (Amendment) Order 2025
220	The Enterprise Act 2002 (Bodies Designated to make Super-complaints) (Amendment) Order 2025
221	The Medical Profession (Responsible Officers) (Amendment) Regulations 2025
222	The Space Industry (Licence Exemption for Military Activities of Allies) Regulations 2025
223	The Power to Award Degrees etc. (South Devon College) Order 2025
224	The Social Security (Scotland) Act 2018 (Scottish Adult Disability Living Allowance) (Consequential Modifications) Order 2025
225	The Protection of Trading Interests (Authorisation) (Amendment) Regulations 2025
226	The Online Safety Act 2023 (Category 1, Category 2A and Category 2B Threshold Conditions) Regulations 2025
227	The Social Security (Scotland) Act 2018 (Disability Assistance) (Consequential Amendments) Order 2025
228	The Excise Duties (Surcharges or Rebates) (Hydrocarbon Oils etc.) Order 2022 (Continuation) Order 2025
229	The Social Security (Scotland) Act 2018 (Scottish Adult Disability Living Allowance) (Consequential Amendments) (No. 2) Order 2025
230 (W. 49)	The Agricultural Tenancies (Requests for Landlord’s Consent or Variation of Terms) (Wales) (Amendment) Regulations 2025
231	The Register of Overseas Entities (Protection and Trusts) (Amendment) Regulations 2025
232	The Health and Social Care Act 2008 (Regulated Activities) (Amendment) Regulations 2025
233-235	Not Allocated
236	The Wildlife Licence Charges (England) Order 2025
237 (W. 50)	The A470 Trunk Road (Layby north of Merthyr Tydfil) (Temporary Prohibition of Vehicles) Order 2025
238	The Courses Offered as an Alternative to Prosecution (Specified Fixed Penalty Offences) (Traffic) Regulations 2025
239	The Oil and Gas Authority (Levy and Fees) Regulations 2025
240	The Health and Care Professions Council (Miscellaneous Amendments) Rules Order of Council 2025
241	The Air Navigation (Restriction of Flying) (Sefton Park, Liverpool) Regulations 2025
242	The Council Tax (Discount Disregards and Exempt Dwellings) (Amendment) (England) Regulations 2025
243	The Air Navigation (Restriction of Flying) (Westminster) (Emergency) Regulations 2025
244	The Air Navigation (Restriction of Flying) (Westminster) (Emergency) (Revocation) Regulations 2025
245	The National Health Service Commissioning Board and Clinical Commissioning Groups (Responsibilities and Standing Rules) (Amendment) Regulations 2025
246	The M23 Motorway (Junction 7) (50 Miles Per Hour Speed Limit) Regulations 2025
247	The Air Navigation (Restriction of Flying) (Jet Formation Display Teams) Regulations 2025
248 (W. 51)	The A470 Trunk Road (Llyswen, Powys) (Temporary Prohibition of Vehicles) Order 2025
249	The Transmissible Spongiform Encephalopathies (Amendment) (England) Regulations 2025
250	The Financial Services and Markets Act 2000 (Exemption) (Amendment) Order 2025
251	The Air Navigation (Restriction of Flying) (Abingdon) Regulations 2025
252	The Public Service Pensions Revaluation Order 2025
253 (W. 52)	The A40 Trunk Road (Raglan Roundabout to Hardwick Roundabout, Abergavenny, Monmouthshire) (Temporary 50 mph Speed Limit) Order 2025
254	The Air Navigation (Restriction of Flying) (Birmingham) (No. 2) Regulations 2025
255	The Social Security Revaluation of Earnings Factors Order 2025
256	The Recognition of Overseas Qualifications (Charges) (England and Wales and Northern Ireland) Regulations 2025
257	The Offshore Installations (Safety Zones) Order 2025
258	The Air Navigation (Restriction of Flying) (Clacton-on-Sea) Regulations 2025
259 (W. 53)	The A477 Trunk Road (Sageston Roundabout, Pembrokeshire) (Derestriction) Order 2025
260 (W. 54)	The Charges for Residues Surveillance (Amendment) (Wales) Regulations 2025
261 (C. 8)	The Domestic Abuse Act 2021 (Commencement No. 7 and Saving Provisions) Regulations 2025
262	The Immigration (Biometric Registration) (Civil Penalty Code of Practice) Order 2025
263	The Higher Education (Fee Limits and Fee Limit Condition) (England) (Amendment) Regulations 2025
264	The Guaranteed Minimum Pensions Increase Order 2025
265	The Air Navigation (Restriction of Flying) (Anmer Hall) (Restricted Zone EG R220) Regulations 2025
266	The Registration and Inspection of Education, Children's Services and Skills (Fees) (England) (Amendment) Regulations 2025
267	The Digital Markets, Competition and Consumers Act 2024 (CMA Consumer Enforcement Rules) Regulations 2025
268	The Government Resources and Accounts Act 2000 (Estimates and Accounts) Order 2025
269	The Heat Networks (Market Framework) (Great Britain) Regulations 2025
270	The Taxes (Interest Rate) (Amendment) Regulations 2025
271	The Judicial Pensions (European Court of Human Rights) (Amendment) Order 2025
272	The Digital Markets, Competition and Consumers Act 2024 (Commencement No. 2) Regulations 2025
273 (W. 55)	The Non-Domestic Rating (Withdrawal of Charitable Relief for Independent Schools) (Wales) Regulations 2025
274	The Air Navigation (Restriction of Flying) (Ragley Hall, Alcester) Regulations 2025
275 (S. 1)	The Moveable Transactions (Scotland) Act 2023 (Financial Collateral Arrangements and Financial Instruments) (Consequential Provisions and Modifications) Order 2025
276	The Air Navigation (Restriction of Flying) (Sandringham House) (Restricted Zone EG R219) Regulations 2025
277	The Air Navigation (Restriction of Flying) (Birmingham) (No. 2) (Amendment) Regulations 2025
278	The Merchant Shipping (Light Dues) Regulations 2025
279 (W. 56)	The M48 Motorway (Junction 23 (Rogiet) to Junction 2 (Newhouse Interchange), Monmouthshire) (Temporary 50 mph Speed Limit) Order 2025
280	The Diocese of York (Educational Endowments) (St Mary’s Church of England Day School (Boys' Department)) Order 2025
281	The Diocese of Salisbury (Educational Endowments) (Redlynch Church of England Primary School) Order 2025
282	The Immigration and Nationality (Fees) (Amendment) Order 2025
283	The Air Navigation (Restriction of Flying) (Sandringham House) (Restricted Zone EG R219) (Amendment) Regulations 2025
284	The Teachers’ Pensions Schemes (Amendment) Regulations 2025
285 (W. 57)	The National Health Service (Pharmaceutical Services) (Wales) (Miscellaneous Amendments) Regulations 2025
286 (W. 58)	The Elections and Elected Bodies (Wales) Act 2024 (Consequential Amendments) Regulations 2025
287	The Certification of Fuels and Fireplaces (Charges) (England) Regulations 2025
288	The Social Security (Contributions) (Rates, Limits and Thresholds Amendments, National Insurance Funds Payments and Extension of Veteran's Relief) Regulations 2025
289	The Seafarers' Wages (Amendment) Regulations 2025
290	The Air Navigation (Restriction of Flying) (North West Transit Corridor) (Restricted Zone EGR353) (Amendment) Regulations 2025
291	The Health Protection (Notification) (Amendment) Regulations 2025
292	The Child Benefit and Guardian's Allowance Up-rating Order 2025
293 (W. 59)	The Agricultural Wages (Wales) Order 2025
294	The Income Tax (Pay As You Earn) (Amendment) Regulations 2025
295	The Social Security Benefits Up-rating Order 2025
296	The Persistent Organic Pollutants (Amendment) Regulations 2025
297	The Persistent Organic Pollutants (Amendment) (No. 2) Regulations 2025
298	The Air Navigation (Restriction of Flying) (Fife and Angus) Regulations 2025
299	The REACH Fees and Charges (Amendment of Commission Regulation (EC) No 340/2008) Regulations 2025
300	The Police and Criminal Evidence Act 1984 and the Criminal Justice and Public Order Act 1994 (Application to Food Crime Officers) Regulations 2025

== 301-400 ==
Number	Title
301	The Food Crime Officers (Complaints and Misconduct) Regulations 2025
302	House of Commons Members’ Fund Resolution 2025
303	The Football Spectators (2025 FIFA Club World Cup Control Period) Order 2025
304 (W. 60) (C. 9)	The Children Act 2004 (Commencement No. 10) (Wales) Order 2025
305 (W. 61)	The A470 Trunk Road (Hendre Wen Farm, Llanrwst, to Waterloo Bridge, Betws Y Coed, Conwy) (Temporary Traffic Prohibitions and Restrictions) Order 2025
306	The Personal Injuries (Civilians) Scheme (Amendment) Order 2025
307	The Armed Forces and Reserve Forces (Compensation Scheme) (Amendment) Order 2025
308 (W. 62)	The Education (Information about Children in Independent Schools) (Pilot) (Wales) Regulations 2025
309	The Shropshire (Electoral Changes) (Amendment) Order 2025
310	The National Health Service (Dental Charges) (Amendment) Regulations 2025
311 (W. 63)	The A4042 Trunk Road (Cwmbran Roundabout to Pontypool Roundabout, Torfaen) (Temporary Speed Restrictions & No Overtaking) Order 2025
312	The Recovery of Costs (Remand to Youth Detention Accommodation) (Amendment) Regulations 2025
313	The Air Navigation (Restriction of Flying) (North East of Spurn Point) (Emergency) Regulations 2025
314	The Air Navigation (Restriction of Flying) (North West Transit Corridor) (Restricted Area EGR323) (Amendment) Regulations 2025
315 (W. 64)	The A483 Trunk Road (Glanhafren, north of Abermule and Dolfor, Powys) & the A44 Trunk Road (West of Llangurig, Powys) (Temporary 30 mph Speed Limit & No Overtaking) Order 2025
316	The National Health Service Pension Schemes (Amendment) Regulations 2025
317	The Medicines (Products for Human Use) (Fees) (Amendment) Regulations 2025
318	The Social Security (Contributions) (Re-rating) Consequential Amendment Regulations 2025
319 (C. 10)	The Domestic Abuse Act 2021 (Commencement No. 8 and Saving Provisions) Regulations 2025
320	The Immigration (Passenger Transit Visa) (Amendment) Order 2025
321	The Social Security (Contributions) (Amendment No. 2) Regulations 2025
322	The Non-Domestic Rating (Levy and Safety Net) (Amendment) Regulations 2025
323	The Air Navigation (Restriction of Flying) (Birmingham) (No. 3) Regulations 2025
324	The Air Navigation (Restriction of Flying) (Virginia Water, Surrey) Regulations 2025
325	The Social Security (Contributions) (Amendment No. 3) Regulations 2025
326	The Statutory Neonatal Care Pay (Miscellaneous Amendments) Regulations 2025
327	The Help-to-Save Accounts Regulations 2025
328	The Social Security (Contributions) (Amendment No. 4) Regulations 2025
329 (W. 65)	The Welsh Language (Wales) Measure 2011 (Amendment of Schedule 6) Order 2025
330	The Statutory Maternity Pay (Compensation of Employers) (Amendment) Regulations 2025
331 (W. 66)	The Welsh Elections Information Platform Regulations 2025
332	Mid-Suffolk Light Railway Order 2025
333	The Air Navigation (Restriction of Flying) (Bath) Regulations 2025
334	The Air Navigation (Restriction of Flying) (Leicester, Diwali Celebrations) Regulations 2025
335	The Access to the Countryside (Coastal Margin) (Humber Bridge to Easington) Order 2025
336	The Inspectors of Education, Children’s Services and Skills Order 2025
337	The Guardian’s Allowance Up-rating Regulations 2025
338 (W. 67) (C. 11)	The Social Partnership and Public Procurement (Wales) Act 2023 (Commencement No. 3) Order 2025
339 (W. 68)	The Welsh Language Standards (No. 1, No. 2, No. 4, No. 6 and No. 7) Regulations (Amendment) Regulations 2025
340 (W. 69)	The Social Care Wales (Specification of Social Care Workers) (Registration) (Amendment) Regulations 2025
341	The Mesothelioma Lump Sum Payments (Conditions and Amounts) (Amendment) Regulations 2025
342	The Town and Country Planning (Fees for Applications, Deemed Applications, Requests and Site Visits) (England) (Amendment and Transitional Provision) Regulations 2025
343	The Pensions Increase (Review) Order 2025
344	The Double Taxation Relief (Russian Federation) (Revocation) Order 2025
345	The Double Taxation Relief and International Tax Enforcement (Belarus) (Revocation) Order 2025
346 (W. 70)	The A458 Trunk Road (Welshpool, Powys) (Temporary Prohibition of Vehicles and Cyclists) Order 2025
347	The Pneumoconiosis etc. (Workers’ Compensation) (Payment of Claims) (Amendment) Regulations 2025
348	The Employment Rights (Increase of Limits) Order 2025
349 (C. 12)	The Economic Crime and Corporate Transparency Act 2023 (Commencement No. 4) Regulations 2025
350	The Social Security Contributions (Decisions and Appeals) (Amendment) Regulations 2025
351	The Court and Tribunal Fees (Miscellaneous Amendments) Order 2025
352	The Social Security Benefits Up-rating Regulations 2025
353	The Air Navigation (Restriction of Flying) (Portrush, Northern Ireland) Regulations 2025
354	Not Allocated
355 (W. 71)	The A40 Trunk Road (Trecastle, Powys) (Temporary Prohibition of Vehicles) Order 2025
356	The Motor Vehicles (Driving Licences) (Amendment) (No. 3) Regulations 2025
357	Not Allocated
358 (W. 72)	The A5 Trunk Road (Bethesda to Llys y Gwynt Interchange) (Temporary Traffic Prohibitions and Restrictions) Order 2025
359	The Street Works (Charges for Occupation of the Highway) (East Sussex County Council) Order 2025
360	The Grants to the Churches Conservation Trust Order 2025
361	The Food and Feed (Regulated Products) (Amendment, Revocation, Consequential and Transitional Provision) Regulations 2025
362	The North Lincolnshire Green Energy Park Order 2025
363	The Immigration, Nationality and Passport (Fees) (Amendment) Regulations 2025
364	The Annual Tax on Enveloped Dwellings (Indexation of Annual Chargeable Amounts) Order 2025
365	The Safeguarding Vulnerable Groups Act 2006 (Amendment) (Provision of Information) Order 2025
366	The Air Navigation (Restriction of Flying) (Newcastle Upon Tyne) Regulations 2025
367	The New Heavy-Duty Vehicles (Carbon Dioxide Emission Performance Standards) (Miscellaneous Amendments) Regulations 2025
368	The Online Safety (CSEA Content Reporting by Regulated User-to-User Service Providers) Regulations 2025
369	The Merchant Shipping (Light Dues) (Amendment) Regulations 2025
370 (W. 73)	The Charges for Residues Surveillance (Amendment and Revocation) (Wales) Regulations 2025
371 (C. 13)	The Online Safety Act 2023 (Commencement No. 5) Regulations 2025
372	The Legal Officers (Annual Fees) Order 2025
373	The Flood Reinsurance (Amendment) Regulations 2025
374	The Air Navigation (Restriction of Flying) (VE Day 80) Regulations 2025
375	The Neonatal Care Leave and Miscellaneous Amendments Regulations 2025
376	The Statutory Neonatal Care Pay (General) Regulations 2025
377 (W. 74)	The Building etc. (Amendment) (Wales) Regulations 2025
378	The Electricity (Individual Exemption from the Requirement for a Transmission Licence) (Spiorad na Mara) (Scotland) Order 2025
379	The Air Navigation (Restriction of Flying) (Helicopter Flight) (No. 3) Regulations 2025
380 (W. 75) (C. 14)	The Regulation and Inspection of Social Care (Wales) Act 2016 (Commencement No. 8) Order 2025
381	The Digital Markets, Competition and Consumers Act 2024 (Consequential Amendments) Regulations 2025
382	The Immigration (Biometric Information etc.) (Amendment) Regulations 2025
383	The Relief for Creative Industries (Additional Information Requirements and Miscellaneous Amendments) (Amendment) Regulations 2025
384 (W. 76)	The Feed Additives (Authorisations) and Uses of Feed Intended for Particular Nutritional Purposes (Amendment of Commission Regulation (EU) 2020/354) (Wales) (Amendment) Regulations 2025
385	The Air Navigation (Restriction of Flying) (Liverpool) Regulations 2025
386	The Taxes and Duties, etc (Interest Rate) (Amendment) Regulations 2025
387	The Universal Credit, Personal Independence Payment, Jobseeker's Allowance and Employment and Support Allowance (Claims and Payments) (Modification) Regulations 2025
388 (W. 77)	The Partnership Arrangements (Wales) (Amendment) Regulations 2025
389 (W. 78)	The Regulated Services (Inspection Ratings) (Wales) Regulations 2025
390	The Cattewater Harbour Revision Order 2025
391	The Air Navigation (Restriction of Flying) (Helicopter Flight) (No. 3) (Amendment) Regulations 2025
392	The East and North Hertfordshire National Health Service Trust (Establishment) (Amendment) Order 2025
393	The Air Navigation (Restriction of Flying) (Liverpool) (No. 2) Regulations 2025
394	The Sanctions (EU Exit) (Miscellaneous Amendments) Regulations 2025
395 (W. 79)	The Food (Promotion and Presentation) (Wales) Regulations 2025
396	The Diocese of Leicester (Educational Endowments) (Queniborough Church of England Primary School) Order 2025
397	The Power to Award Degrees etc. (Engineering College of Technology Limited) Order 2025
398	The Air Navigation (Restriction of Flying) (North East of Spurn Point) (Emergency) (Revocation) Regulations 2025
399 (C. 15)	The Finance Act 2021 (Amendment of Schedule 26 Penalty Figures) (Appointed Day: Regulation Making Power) Regulations 2025
400 (W. 80)	The Development Procedure (Consultees) (Wales) (Miscellaneous Amendments) Order 2025

== 401-500 ==
Number	Title
401	The National Minimum Wage (Amendment) Regulations 2025
402	The Drivers’ Hours and Tachographs (Amendment and Modification) Regulations 2025
403 (W. 81)	The Trade in Animals and Related Products (Amendment and Legislative Functions) and Animal Health (Miscellaneous Amendments) (Wales) (EU Exit) (Amendment) Order 2025
404	The Infected Blood Compensation Scheme Regulations 2025
405	The Gangmasters (Licensing Conditions) (Amendment) (Fees) Rules 2025
406	The Multinational Top-up Tax (Pillar Two Territories, Qualifying Domestic Top-up Taxes and Accredited Qualifying Domestic Top-up Taxes) Regulations 2025
407	The Noise Emission in the Environment by Equipment for use Outdoors (Amendment) (Northern Ireland) Regulations 2025
408	The National Security Act 2023 (Foreign Activities and Foreign Influence Registration Scheme: Information and Disclosure) Regulations 2025
409	The Town and Country Planning (Crown Development Applications) (Procedure and Written Representations) Order 2025
410	The Town and Country Planning (Crown Development Applications) (Hearings and Inquiries) Rules 2025
411	The Town and Country Planning (Crown Development) (Urgent Applications) (Procedure) (England) Order 2025
412	The Town and Country Planning (Consequential and Miscellaneous Amendments) Regulations 2025
413	The Cosmetic Products (Restriction of Chemical Substances) Regulations 2025
414	The Air Navigation (Restriction of Flying) (Bovington) Regulations 2025
415	The Civil Legal Aid (Remuneration) (Amendment) Regulations 2025
416	The Air Navigation (Restriction of Flying) (Duxford) Regulations 2025
417	The Customs (Tariff and Miscellaneous Amendments) Regulations 2025
418	The Town and Country Planning (Fees and Consequential Amendments) Regulations 2025
419	The Public Service Pension Schemes (Rectification of Unlawful Discrimination) (Tax) Regulations 2025
420	The Air Navigation (Restriction of Flying) (Murrayfield Stadium, Edinburgh) Regulations 2025
421	The Air Navigation (Restriction of Flying) (Glasgow Green) Regulations 2025
422	The Local Authorities (Capital Finance and Accounting) (England) (Amendment) Regulations 2025
423	The Disclosure (Scotland) Act 2020 (Consequential Provisions and Modifications) Order 2025
424	Not Allocated
425 (W. 82)	The Foot-and-Mouth Disease (Wales) (Amendment) Order 2025
426	The Air Navigation (Restriction of Flying) (Epsom) Regulations 2025
427	The Air Navigation (Restriction of Flying) (Crystal Palace) Regulations 2025
428	The Air Navigation (Restriction of Flying) (Longleat) Regulations 2025
429	The Social Security (Contributions) (Amendment No. 5) Regulations 2025
430 (C. 16)	The Levelling-up and Regeneration Act 2023 (Commencement No. 7) Regulations 2025
431	The Student Accommodation (Codes of Management Practice and Specified Educational Establishments) (England) (Amendment) Regulations 2025
432 (W. 83) (C. 17)	The Tertiary Education and Research (Wales) Act 2022 (Commencement No. 5 and Transitory and Transitional Provisions) Order 2025
433	The Community Infrastructure Levy (Amendment etc.) (England) Regulations 2025
434	The Horizon Shortfall Scheme Appeals (Tax Exemptions and Relief) Regulations 2025
435 (W. 84)	The Tertiary Education and Research (Wales) Act 2022 (Consequential Amendments) Regulations 2025
436	The Consular Fees (Amendment) Order 2025
437	The Air Navigation (Restriction of Flying) (Cleethorpes) Regulations 2025
438	The Air Navigation (Restriction of Flying) (Scarborough) Regulations 2025
439	The Companies (Directors' Remuneration and Audit) (Amendment) Regulations 2025
440 (W. 85)	The Children Act 2004 (Children Missing Education Database) (Pilot) (Wales) Regulations 2025
441 (C. 18)	The Victims and Prisoners Act 2024 (Commencement No. 5) Regulations 2025
442	Not Allocated
443	The Electronic Communications (Networks and Services) (Designated Vendor Directions) (Penalties) Order 2025
444	The Companies Act 2006 (Recognition of Third Country Qualifications and Practical Training) (Amendment) Regulations 2025
445	The Maidstone (Electoral Changes) (Amendment) Order 2025
446	The Electricity (Early-Model Competitive Tenders for Onshore Transmission Licences) Regulations 2025
447	The Environment Act 2021 (Commencement No. 10) Regulations 2025
448	The Power to Award Degrees etc. (College of Legal Practice Limited) (Amendment) Order 2025
449	The River Tyne (Tunnels) (Revision of Toll) Order 2025
450	The Air Navigation (Restriction of Flying) (Finsbury Park) Regulations 2025
451	The Air Navigation (Restriction of Flying) (Royal Air Force Honington) Regulations 2025
452	The Cambridge Waste Water Treatment Plant Relocation Order 2025
453	The Air Navigation (Restriction of Flying) (Manston) Regulations 2025
454	The Road Vehicles (Construction and Use) (Amendment) Regulations 2025
455	The Victim Support (Specified Roles) Regulations 2025
456	Not Allocated
457	The Tamar Bridge and Torpoint Ferry (Revision of Tolls) Order 2025
458	The Air Navigation (Restriction of Flying) (Cosby, Leicestershire) Regulations 2025
459	The Wakefield (Electoral Changes) Order 2025
460	The Barnsley (Electoral Changes) Order 2025
461	The Bradford (Electoral Changes) Order 2025
462	The A122 (Lower Thames Crossing) Development Consent Order 2025
463	The London Luton Airport Expansion Development Consent Order 2025
464	The Air Navigation (Restriction of Flying) (VE Day Anniversary Flypast Rehearsal) Regulations 2025
465	The Power to Award Degrees etc. (Architectural Association School of Architecture) Order of Council 2019 (Amendment) Order 2025
466	The Civil Proceedings and Magistrates' Courts Fees (Amendment) Order 2025
467	The Air Navigation (Restriction of Flying) (Finchley) Regulations 2025
468	The Rampion 2 Offshore Wind Farm Order 2025
469	The Air Navigation (Restriction of Flying) (Darley Moor, Derbyshire) (Emergency) Regulations 2025
470	The Air Navigation (Restriction of Flying) (Harrow) Regulations 2025
471	The Air Navigation (Restriction of Flying) (Darley Moor, Derbyshire) (Emergency) (Revocation) Regulations 2025
472	The Air Navigation (Restriction of Flying) (Chelsea) Regulations 2025
473 (W. 86) (C. 19)	The Criminal Justice and Immigration Act 2008 (Commencement No. 1) (Wales) Order 2025
474	The Air Navigation (Restriction of Flying) (VE Day 80) (Amendment) Regulations 2025
475	The National Grid (Bramford to Twinstead Reinforcement) (Correction) Order 2025
476	The Air Navigation (Restriction of Flying) (Lytham St Annes) Regulations 2025
477	The Power to Award Degrees etc. (ICMP Management Limited) (Amendment) Order 2025
478	The Air Navigation (Restriction of Flying) (Jet Formation Display Teams) (Amendment) Regulations 2025
479	The Air Navigation (Restriction of Flying) (Villa Park, Birmingham) Regulations 2025
480	The Air Navigation (Restriction of Flying) (Coventry) Regulations 2025
481	The West Midlands Rail Freight Interchange (Amendment No. 2) Order 2025
482	The Heckington Fen Solar Park (Correction) Order 2025
483	The Air Navigation (Restriction of Flying) (Sheffield) Regulations 2025
484	The Air Navigation (Restriction of Flying) (Charlbury, Oxfordshire) Regulations 2025
485	The Hornsea Four Offshore Wind Farm (Amendment) Order 2025
486	The Air Navigation (Restriction of Flying) (Wembley) Regulations 2025
487	The Air Navigation (Restriction of Flying) (Edinburgh) Regulations 2025
488 (W. 87)	The A40 Trunk Road (Carmarthen Bypass, Carmarthenshire) (Temporary Prohibition of Vehicles) Order 2025
489 (W. 88)	The A55 Trunk Road (Junction 11 (Llys y Gwynt Interchange), Bangor, Gwynedd to the Wales/England Border) and the A494/A550 Trunk Road (Ewloe Interchange to the Wales/England Border, Flintshire) (Temporary Traffic Prohibitions and Restrictions) Order 2025
490	The Air Navigation (Restriction of Flying) (Ascot) (No. 2) Regulations 2025
491 (W. 89) (C. 20)	The Environment Act 2021 (Commencement No. 3) (Wales) Regulations 2025
492 (W. 90)	The A5, A44, A55, A458, A470, A479, A483, A487, A489 and A494 Trunk Roads (Various Locations in North and Mid Wales) (Temporary Prohibition of Vehicles) Order 2025
493 (W. 91)	The A40 Trunk Road (Robeston Wathen Roundabout to Pengawse Hill Junction, Pembrokeshire) (Temporary Traffic Prohibitions and Restrictions) Order 2025
494	The Power to Award Degrees etc. (National Film and Television School (The)) (Amendment) Order 2025
495	The Air Navigation (Restriction of Flying) (Helicopter Flight) (No. 4) Regulations 2025
496	The Air Navigation (Restriction of Flying) (VE Day 80 Anniversary Flypast) Regulations 2025
497	The Ecodesign for Energy-Related Products and Energy Information (Amendment) (Northern Ireland) Regulations 2025
498	The Oil and Gas Authority (Carbon Storage) (Retention of Information and Samples) Regulations 2025
499	The Air Navigation (Restriction of Flying) (Ascot and Windsor) Regulations 2025
500	The Air Navigation (Restriction of Flying) (Newtownards, Northern Ireland) Regulations 2025

== 501-600 ==
Number	Title
501 (C. 21)	The Investigatory Powers (Amendment) Act 2024 (Commencement No. 2) Regulations 2025
502	The Police (Vetting) Regulations 2025
503	The Gambling Act 2005 (Gaming Tables in Casinos) (Definitions) (Amendment) Regulations 2025
504	The Russia (Sanctions) (EU Exit) (Amendment) Regulations 2025
505	The Motor Vehicles (Driving Licences) (Amendment) (No. 4) Regulations 2025
506	The Air Navigation (Restriction of Flying) (Glastonbury) Regulations 2025
507	The Syria (Sanctions) (EU Exit) (Amendment) Regulations 2025
508	The Air Navigation (Restriction of Flying) (Sywell) Regulations 2025
509	The Viking CCS Carbon Dioxide Pipeline Order 2025
510	The Ivory Prohibitions (Exemptions) (Process and Procedure) (Amendment) Regulations 2025
511	The Free Zone (Customs Site No. 7 Liverpool) Designation Order 2025
512 & 513	Not Allocated
514	The Energy (Euratom Decisions and Miscellaneous Provisions) (Amendment and Revocation) Regulations 2025
515 (C. 22)	The Domestic Abuse Act 2021 (Commencement No. 9 and Saving Provisions) Regulations 2025
516 (W. 92)	The Bovine Viral Diarrhoea (Wales) (Amendment) Order 2025
517	The Air Navigation (Restriction of Flying) (Beccles) Regulations 2025
518	The Air Navigation (Restriction of Flying) (Liverpool) (No. 3) Regulations 2025
519	The Air Navigation (Restriction of Flying) (Birmingham) (No. 4) Regulations 2025
520	Not Allocated
521 (W. 93)	The A458 Trunk Road (Welshpool, Powys) (Temporary Prohibition of Vehicles and Cyclists) Order 2025
522	The Public Procurement (Revocation) Regulations 2025
523	The Ferrybridge Multifuel 2 Power Station (Amendment) Order 2025
524	The Air Navigation (Restriction of Flying) (Helicopter Flight) (No. 5) Regulations 2025
525	The Industrial Training Levy (Construction Industry Training Board) Order 2025
526	The Official Controls (Extension of Transitional Periods) (Amendment) Regulations 2025
527	The A12 Chelmsford to A120 Widening Development Consent (Corrections) Order 2025
528 (C. 23)	The Higher Education (Freedom of Speech) Act 2023 (Commencement No. 3) Regulations 2025
529	The Aviation Security (Amendment) Regulations 2025
530	The Northern Ireland Troubles (Legacy and Reconciliation) Act 2023 (Commencement No. 2 and Transitional Provisions) (Amendment) Regulations 2025
531	The Furniture and Furnishings (Fire) (Safety) (Amendment) Regulations 2025
532	The Export Control (Amendment) Regulations 2025
533	The Rivenhall Generating Station Extension (Correction) Order 2025
534	The Air Navigation (Restriction of Flying) (Bloxwich) (Emergency) Regulations 2025
535 (C. 24)	The Firearms Act 2023 (Commencement) Regulations 2025
536	The Online Procedure Rules (Specified Proceedings) Regulations 2025
537	The Proceeds of Crime Act 2002 (References to Financial Investigators) (England and Wales and Northern Ireland) (Amendment) Order 2025
538	The Medicines for Human Use (Clinical Trials) (Amendment) Regulations 2025
539	The Air Navigation (Restriction of Flying) (Royal Air Force Leeming) Regulations 2025
540	The Air Navigation (Restriction of Flying) (Royal Air Force Odiham) Regulations 2025
541	The Air Navigation (Restriction of Flying) (Helicopter Flight) (No. 6) Regulations 2025
542	The Air Navigation (Restriction of Flying) (Royal Air Force Coningsby) (No. 2) Regulations 2025
543	The Air Navigation (Restriction of Flying) (Penrith) Regulations 2025
544	The Air Navigation (Restriction of Flying) (East Kirkby) Regulations 2025
545	The Air Navigation (Restriction of Flying) (Scampton) (Revocations) Regulations 2025
546	The Air Navigation (Restriction of Flying) (Bloxwich) (Emergency) (Revocation) Regulations 2025
547	The Air Navigation (Restriction of Flying) (SS Richard Montgomery) Regulations 2025
548	The Air Navigation (Restriction of Flying) (King’s Birthday Flypast Rehearsals) Regulations 2025
549	The Insolvency Practitioners (Recognised Professional Bodies) (Revocation of Recognition of the Institute of Chartered Accountants in Ireland) Order 2025
550	The Air Navigation (Restriction of Flying) (Murrayfield Stadium, Edinburgh) (No. 2) Regulations 2025
551	The Air Navigation (Restriction of Flying) (Royal Air Force Valley) Regulations 2025
552 (W. 94)	The A487 Trunk Road (Llanrhystud, Ceredigion) (Temporary Prohibition of Vehicles) Order 2025
553	The Taxation of Chargeable Gains (Gilt-edged Securities) Order 2025
554	The Inspectors of Education, Children’s Services and Skills (No. 2) Order 2025
555	The Scotland Act 1998 (Agency Arrangements) (Specification) (Recognition of Qualifications) Order 2025
556	The Transfer of Functions (Fire and Rescue Services) Order 2025
557	The Transfer of Functions (Digital Government) Order 2025
558	The Police (Conduct, Performance and Complaints and Misconduct) (Amendment) Regulations 2025
559	The Phytosanitary Conditions (Amendment) Regulations 2025
560	The Town and Country Planning (General Permitted Development) (England) (Amendment) Order 2025
561 (L. 3)	The Tribunal Procedure (Amendment) Rules 2025
562	The Licensing Act 2003 (Victory in Europe Day Licensing Hours) Order 2025
563	The Blyth (Extension of Limits) Harbour Revision Order 2025
564	The Sunderland (Electoral Changes) Order 2025
565	The Kirklees (Electoral Changes) Order 2025
566	The Newcastle upon Tyne (Electoral Changes) Order 2025
567 (W. 95)	The A5 Trunk Road (High Street, Bethesda, Gwynedd) (Temporary Prohibition of Vehicles) Order 2025
568	The Agriculture (Delinked Payments) (Reductions) (England) Regulations 2025
569	The Registration of Marriages and Civil Partnerships (Registration Provisions) (Amendment) Regulations 2025
570	The Air Navigation (Restriction of Flying) (Royal Air Force Mildenhall) Regulations 2025
571	The Wireless Telegraphy (Spectrum Trading and Register) (Amendment) Regulations 2025
572 (C. 25)	The Financial Services and Markets Act 2023 (Commencement No. 9) Regulations 2025
573	The Companies and Limited Liability Partnerships (Annotation) Regulations 2025
574 (W. 96)	The A48 Trunk Road (Briton Ferry Roundabout to Sunnycroft Roundabout, Neath Porth Talbot) (Derestriction) Order 2025
575 (C. 26)	The Genetic Technology (Precision Breeding) Act 2023 (Commencement No. 1) Regulations 2025
576 (W. 97)	The A40 Trunk Road (Whitland West & East Roundabouts, Carmarthenshire) (Derestriction) Order 2025
577	The Air Navigation (Restriction of Flying) (Bradford) Regulations 2025
578	The Value Added Tax (Amendment) Regulations 2025
579	The Air Navigation (Restriction of Flying) (Hay-on-Wye) Regulations 2025
580	The Retained EU Law (Revocation and Reform) Act 2023 (Social Security Co-ordination) (Compatibility) Regulations 2025
581	The Genetic Technology (Precision Breeding) Regulations 2025
582	The Access to the Countryside (Coastal Margin) (Mablethorpe to Humber Bridge) Order 2025
583	The Financial Services and Markets Act 2023 (Private Intermittent Securities and Capital Exchange System Sandbox) Regulations 2025
584	The Air Navigation (Restriction of Flying) (Royal Air Force Mildenhall) (Amendment) Regulations 2025
585	The East Yorkshire Solar Farm Order 2025
586	The Air Navigation (Restriction of Flying) (Trooping the Colour) Regulations 2025
587	The Air Navigation (Restriction of Flying) (Silverstone and Turweston) Regulations 2025
588	The Air Navigation (Restriction of Flying) (Royal International Air Tattoo, Royal Air Force Fairford) Regulations 2025
589	The Finance Act 2021 (Increase in Schedule 26 Penalty Percentages) Regulations 2025
590	The Childcare (Fees) (Amendment) Regulations 2025
591	The Medical Devices (Amendment) (Great Britain) Regulations 2025
592	The Price Marking (Amendment) Order 2025
593	The Air Navigation (Restriction of Flying) (Darfield, South Yorkshire) (Emergency) Regulations 2025
594	The Air Navigation (Restriction of Flying) (Bicester) (Emergency) Regulations 2025
595	Not Allocated
596	The Folkestone Harbour Revision Order (Amendment) Order 2025
597	The Manston Airport Development Consent (Amendment) Order 2025
598 (C. 27)	The Institute for Apprenticeships and Technical Education (Transfer of Functions etc) Act 2025 (Commencement) Regulations 2025
599	The Apprenticeships (Miscellaneous Provisions) (England) (Amendment) Regulations 2025
600	The School Information (England) (Amendment) Regulations 2025

== 601-700 ==
Number	Title
601	The York and North Yorkshire Combined Authority (Adult Education Functions) Order 2025
602	The East Midlands Combined County Authority (Adult Education Functions) Regulations 2025
603	The Cornwall Council (Adult Education Functions) Regulations 2025
604	The Public Interest Disclosure (Prescribed Persons) (Amendment) Order 2025
605	The Persistent Organic Pollutants (Amendment) (No. 3) Regulations 2025
606	The Air Navigation (Restriction of Flying) (Darfield, South Yorkshire) (Emergency) (Revocation) Regulations 2025
607	The M48 Motorway (Severn Bridge) (Temporary Prohibition of Heavy Goods Vehicles) Order 2025
608	The Motor Vehicles (Driving Licences) (Amendment) (No. 2) Regulations 2025
609 (W. 98)	The A44 Trunk Road (West of Llangurig, Powys) (Temporary Prohibition of Vehicles) Order 2025
610	The Fair Dealing Obligations (Pigs) Regulations 2025
611	The Legal Aid, Sentencing and Punishment of Offenders Act 2012 (Legal Aid: Domestic Abuse) (Miscellaneous Amendments) Order 2025
612 (W. 99)	The A40, A487, A4076, A477, A48, A483, A465, A470, A4060, A4232, A4042, A449 and A466 Trunk Roads & the A48(M), M4 and M48 Motorways (Various Locations in South and West Wales) (Temporary Prohibition of Vehicles) Order 2025
613 (W. 100)	The A4232 Trunk Road (Capel Llanilltern to Culverhouse Cross, Cardiff) (Temporary Prohibition of Vehicles) Order 2025
614 (W. 101)	The A470 Trunk Road (Coryton Roundabout, Cardiff to Abercynon Roundabout, Rhondda Cynon Taf) (Derestriction and 40 mph Speed Limit) Order 2025
615	The Whiplash Injury (Amendment) Regulations 2025
616	The Victims and Prisoners Act 2024 (Commencement No. 6) Regulations 2025
617	The Air Navigation (Restriction of Flying) (Gunnersbury Park) Regulations 2025
618	The Air Navigation (Restriction of Flying) (Heaton Park) Regulations 2025
619	The Air Navigation (Restriction of Flying) (Leeds) Regulations 2025
620	The Air Navigation (Restriction of Flying) (Cromer, Norfolk) Regulations 2025
621	The Air Navigation (Restriction of Flying) (Rushden, Northamptonshire) (Emergency) Regulations 2025
622	The Immingham Open Cycle Gas Turbine (Amendment) (No. 3) Order 2025
623 (W. 102)	Brecon Mountain Railway (Transfer) Order 2025
624 (W. 103)	The A4060 Trunk Road (A470 Abercanaid Roundabout to A4060 Pentrebach Roundabout, Merthyr Tydfil) (Temporary Traffic Prohibitions and Speed Restriction) Order 2025
625 (W. 104)	The M4 Motorway (Junction 37 (Pyle Interchange) to Junction 38 (Margam Interchange), Bridgend, Bridgend County Borough) (Temporary Traffic Prohibitions and Restrictions) Order 2025
626	The Higher Education (Registration Fees) (England) (Amendment) Regulations 2025
627	The Air Navigation (Restriction of Flying) (Rushden, Northamptonshire) (Emergency) (Revocation) Regulations 2025
628	The Worcestershire County Council (Hampton Bridge) Scheme 2025 Confirmation Instrument 2025
629	The Transport Act 2000 (Air Traffic Services) (Amendment) Order 2025
630	The Air Navigation (Restriction of Flying) (Murrayfield Stadium, Edinburgh) (No. 3) Regulations 2025
631	The Air Navigation (Restriction of Flying) (Portrush, Northern Ireland) (No. 2) Regulations 2025
632	The School Travel (Pupils with Dual Registration) (England) (Amendment) Regulations 2025
633	The Air Navigation (Restriction of Flying) (Syerston) Regulations 2025
634 (W. 105)	The A40 Trunk Road (Trecastle, Powys to Halfway, Carmarthenshire) (Temporary Prohibition of Vehicles) Order 2025
635	The Subsidy Control (Subsidy Database Information Requirements) (Amendment) Regulations 2025
636	The National Health Service (Charges, Remission of Charges and Pharmaceutical Services etc.) (Amendment and Transitional Provisions) Regulations 2025
637	The Power to Award Degrees etc. (Spurgeon’s College) (Amendment) Order 2025
638	The Electricity (Individual Exemption from the Requirement for a Supply Licence) (JG Pears Power Limited) (England) Order 2025
639	The Immigration (Citizens’ Rights Appeals) (EU Exit) (Amendment) Regulations 2025
640	The Access to the Countryside (Coastal Margin) (Isle of Sheppey) (No. 1) Order 2025
641	The Communications Act 2003 (Restrictions on the Advertising of Less Healthy Food) (Effective Date) (Amendment) Regulations 2025
642	The Access to the Countryside (Coastal Margin) (Kimmeridge Bay to Highcliffe) (No. 1) Order 2025
643	The Access to the Countryside (Coastal Margin) (Newquay to Penzance) (No. 2) Order 2025
644	The Access to the Countryside (Coastal Margin) (Penzance to St Mawes) Order 2025
645	The Access to the Countryside (Coastal Margin) (St Mawes to Cremyll) Order 2025
646 (W. 106)	The Cancellation of Student Loans for Living Costs Liability (Wales) Regulations 2025
647	The West Burton Solar Project (Correction) Order 2025
648	The Diocese of Canterbury (Educational Endowments) (Sturry Church of England Primary School) Order 2025
649 (W. 107)	The A55 Trunk Road (Junction 2 (Tŷ Mawr Interchange), Anglesey) (Temporary Prohibition of Vehicles & Cyclists) Order 2025
650 (W. 108)	The A470 Trunk Road (Talerddig to Commins Coch, Powys) (Temporary Prohibition of Vehicles) Order 2025
651	The Register of Overseas Entities (Annotation) Regulations 2025
652	The Local Audit (Modification of Financial Reporting Requirements) Regulations 2025
653	The Capital Buffers and Macro-prudential Measures Regulations 2025
654 (W. 109)	The A489 & A483 Trunk Roads (Newtown Bypass, Powys) (Temporary Prohibition of Vehicles, Cyclists & Pedestrians) Order 2025
655	The Coroners and Justice Act 2009 (Alteration of Coroner Areas) Order 2025
656	The Investigatory Powers (Codes of Practice, Review of Notices and Technical Advisory Board) Regulations 2025
657	The Air Navigation (Restriction of Flying) (Lancaster) Regulations 2025
658	The Code Manager Selection (Competitive) Regulations 2025
659 (W. 110)	The A40 Trunk Road (Brecon Bypass, Powys) (Temporary Prohibition of Vehicles, Cyclists & Pedestrians) Order 2025
660	The Institute for Apprenticeships and Technical Education (Transfer of Functions etc) Act 2025 (Consequential Amendments) Regulations 2025
661	The Road Vehicles (Type-Approval) (Amendment) Regulations 2025
662	The Water Supply and Sewerage Services (Customer Service Standards) (Amendment) Regulations 2025
663	The Immigration (Exemption from Control) (Amendment) Order 2025
664	The Private Security Industry Act 2001 (Exemption) (Aviation Security) (Amendment) Regulations 2025
665	The Diocese of Chelmsford (Educational Endowments) (Takeley Church of England School) Order 2025
666	The Private Intermittent Securities and Capital Exchange System (Exemption from Stamp Duties) Regulations 2025
667	The Branded Health Service Medicines (Costs) (Amendment) Regulations 2025
668	The Air Navigation (Restriction of Flying) (Royal Edinburgh Military Tattoo) Regulations 2025
669	The Wireless Telegraphy (Licence Award) Regulations 2025
670	The Pension Fund Clearing Obligation Exemption (Amendment) Regulations 2025 2
671	The Air Navigation (Restriction of Flying) (Duxford) (No. 2) Regulations 2025
672	The Antarctic (Amendment) Regulations 2025
673 (W. 111)	The Renting Homes (Wales) Act 2016 (Consequential Amendments) Regulations 2025
674 (C. 28)	The National Security Act 2023 (Commencement No. 2) Regulations 2025
675	The National Security Act 2023 (Foreign Activities and Foreign Influence Registration Scheme: Publication) Regulations 2025
676	The National Security Act 2023 (Foreign Activities and Foreign Influence Registration Scheme: Exemptions for Certain Foreign Power Investment Funds, Education, Government Administration and Public Bodies) Regulations 2025
677	The Inspectors of Education, Children’s Services and Skills (No. 3) Order 2025
678	Not Allocated
679	The Trade Marks (Isle of Man) (Amendment) Order 2025
680 (W. 112)	The A483 Trunk Road (Newtown Bypass to south of Llaethddu junction, Powys) (Temporary Prohibition of Vehicles) Order 2025
681	The Criminal Justice Act 1988 (Offensive Weapons) (Amendment, Surrender and Compensation) (England and Wales) Order 2025
682	The Air Navigation (Restriction of Flying) (His Majesty the King’s Birthday Flypast) Regulations 2025
683 (W. 113)	The A483 Trunk Road (Welshpool Bypass North and South, Powys) (Temporary Prohibition of Vehicles, Cyclists and Pedestrians) Order 2025
684	The National Security Act 2023 (Foreign Activities and Foreign Influence Registration Scheme: Specified Persons) (Russia) Regulations 2025
685	The National Security Act 2023 (Foreign Activities and Foreign Influence Registration Scheme: Specified Persons) (Iran) Regulations 2025
686	The Teversham Award Drains Variation Order 2025
687	The Air Navigation (Restriction of Flying) (Llanelwedd) Regulations 2025
688	The Payment Services and Payment Accounts (Contract Termination) (Amendment) Regulations 2025
689	The Air Navigation (Restriction of Flying) (Dunning, Perthshire) (Emergency) Regulations 2025
690 (W. 114)	The Infrastructure Consent (Pre-Application and Application Procedure and Transitional Provisions) (Wales) Regulations 2025
691 (W. 115)	The Infrastructure Consent (Compulsory Acquisition) (Wales) Regulations 2025
692 (W.116)	The Infrastructure Consent (Examination and Decision) (Procedure) (Wales) Regulations 2025
693	The Air Navigation (Restriction of Flying) (Mosborough) (Emergency) Regulations 2025
694	The Infrastructure Planning (Onshore Wind and Solar Generation) Order 2025
695	The Air Navigation (Restriction of Flying) (Mosborough) (Emergency) (Revocation) Regulations 2025
696	The Air Navigation (Restriction of Flying) (Perth) (Emergency) Regulations 2025
697	The Air Navigation (Restriction of Flying) (Dunning) (Emergency) (Revocation) Regulations 2025
698 (C. 29) (W. 117)	The Infrastructure (Wales) Act 2024 (Commencement No. 1) Order 2025
699	The Wireless Telegraphy (Limitation of Number of Licences) Order 2025
700	The Wireless Telegraphy (Mobile Spectrum Trading) (Amendment) Regulations 2025

== 701-837 ==
Number	Title
701 (W. 118)	The A55 Trunk Road (Eastbound Carriageway from Junction 2 (Tŷ Mawr Interchange) to Junction 3 (Pencaledog Interchange), Anglesey) (Temporary Prohibition of Vehicles, Cyclists & Pedestrians) Order 2025
702	The Air Navigation (Restriction of Flying) (Bicester) (Emergency) (Revocation) Regulations 2025
703	The Revenue and Customs (Complaints and Misconduct) (Amendment) Regulations 2025
704 (W. 119)	The Building (Amendment) (Wales) Regulations 2025
705	The Chichester Harbour Revision Order 2025
706	The Allocation of Housing (Qualification Criteria for Victims of Domestic Abuse and Care Leavers) (England) Regulations 2025
707 (W. 120)	The Procurement (Wales) (Amendment) Regulations 2025
708 (W. 121)	The Environmental Protection (Single-use Vapes) (Wales) (Amendment) Regulations 2025
709 (W. 122)	The Senedd Cymru Constituency Regulations 2025
710 (W. 123)	The A40 Trunk Road (Pontargothi, Carmarthenshire) (Temporary Prohibition of Vehicles) Order 2025
711	The Free Zone (Customs Site No. 2 Thames) Designation Order 2025
712	The Sanctions (EU Exit) (Treasury Debt) Regulations 2025
713	The Air Navigation (Restriction of Flying) (Swansea) Regulations 2025
714	The Oxfordshire County Council (Oxpens River Thames Pedestrian/Cycle Bridge) Scheme 2024 Confirmation Instrument 2025
715	The Air Navigation (Restriction of Flying) (Perth) (Emergency) (Revocation) Regulations 2025
716 (W. 124)	The Environmental Protection (Single-use Plastic Products) (Wet Wipes) (Wales) Regulations 2025
717	Not Allocated
718 (C. 30)	The Economic Crime and Corporate Transparency Act 2023 (Commencement No. 5) Regulations 2025
719	Not Allocated
720	The Air Navigation (Restriction of Flying) (Crickhowell) Regulations 2025
721	Not Allocated
722 (C. 31)	The Investigatory Powers (Amendment) Act 2024 (Commencement No. 3) Regulations 2025
723	The Air Navigation (Restriction of Flying) (Warmsworth, Doncaster) (Emergency) Regulations 2025
724	Not Allocated
725	Not Allocated
726 (C. 32)	The Water (Special Measures) Act 2025 (Commencement No. 1) Regulations 2025
837	The Sheep Carcase (Classification and Price Reporting) (England) Regulations 2025.
