= Thornbury =

Thornbury may refer to:

== Places ==
Australia

- Thornbury, Victoria, a suburb of Melbourne
  - Thornbury railway station, Melbourne

Canada

- Thornbury, Ontario

England

- Thornbury, Devon
- Thornbury, Herefordshire
- Thornbury, Gloucestershire
  - Thornbury Castle
  - Thornbury (UK Parliament constituency), active 1885–1950
  - Stroud and Thornbury (UK Parliament constituency), active 1950–1955
  - Thornbury and Yate (UK Parliament constituency), created 2010
- Thornbury, Bradford, a suburb of Bradford, West Yorkshire
- Thornbury Hospital, Sheffield, South Yorkshire

New Zealand

- Thornbury, New Zealand

United States of America

- Thornbury Township, Delaware County, Pennsylvania
- Thornbury Township, Chester County, Pennsylvania

== People ==
- Thornbury (surname)

== See also ==
- Thornbury Hill, hill in Lincolnshire, England
- Thornberry (disambiguation)
- Thornborough (disambiguation)
- Thornaby-on-Tees
- Thornburg, Pennsylvania
- Thornby (disambiguation)
- The Wild Thornberrys, cartoon series, often misspelled Thornburys
