= Thornbrough (disambiguation) =

Thornbrough may refer to:

Places

- Thornbrough, a civil parish in North Yorkshire, England
- Thornbrough Air Force Base, previous name of Cold Bay Airport in Cold Bay, Alaska, in the United States

People

- Edward Thornbrough (1754-1834), British admiral
- Emma Lou Thornbrough (1913–1994), American historian

Ships

- HMS Thornbrough, alternative spelling of HMS Thornborough (K574), a British frigate in commission in the Royal Navy from 1943 to 1945

== See also ==
- Thornborough (disambiguation)
