= Thornborough =

Thornborough may refer to:

== Places ==
- Thornborough, Buckinghamshire, England
- Thornborough, North Yorkshire, England
  - Thornborough Henges
- Thornborough, Queensland, Australia

== Ships ==
- HMS Thornborough (K574), a frigate in Royal Navy service 1943–1945

== See also ==
- Thornbrough, North Yorkshire, England
