= Chantry House =

Chantry House can refer to many British buildings which were formerly associated with a chantry, including:

- Chantry House, Bunbury, a chantry house in Cheshire, England
- Chantry House, Disley, Cheshire; see Listed buildings in Disley
- Chantry House, Steyning, a house in West Sussex, England
- Chantry House and Chantry Cottage, historic buildings in West Tanfield, North Yorkshire, England
- Wyggeston's Chantry House, now part of Newarke Houses Museum, Leicester, England
- Sacred Heart Primary School, Teddington, the premises were formerly known as "Chantry House"
- Stoke sub Hamdon Priory, a chantry college in Somerset, England

== Other uses ==
- Chantry House, an 1886 novel by Charlotte Mary Yonge; see Charlotte Mary Yonge bibliography
