= Listed buildings in West Tanfield =

West Tanfield is a civil parish in the county of North Yorkshire, England. It contains 24 listed buildings that are recorded in the National Heritage List for England. Of these, two are listed at Grade I, the highest of the three grades, and the others are at Grade II, the lowest grade. The parish contains the village of West Tanfield, the hamlet of Nosterfield, and the surrounding countryside. The most important buildings in the parish are a church and the remaining gatehouse of a castle, which are both listed. Most of the other listed buildings are houses, cottages and farmhouses, and the rest include a bridge, public houses and associated structures, and a former chapel,

== Key ==
Grade	Criteria
I	Buildings of exceptional interest, sometimes considered to be internationally important
II	Buildings of national importance and special interest

== Buildings ==
Name and location	Photograph	Date	Notes	Grade
St Nicholas' Church; 54.20375°N 1.59071°W		Early 13th century	The church has been altered and extended through the centuries, including a restoration in 1859–60 by T. H. Wyatt. It is built in stone with a Welsh slate roof, and consists of a nave, a south porch, a north aisle with a vestry, a chancel and a west tower. The tower has three stages and is in Perpendicular style. It has diagonal buttresses, a west window with a pointed arch and a hood mould, bands, clock faces, two-light bell openings with hood moulds, and a projecting embattled parapet. The porch dates from about 1200, and has a round-arched doorway with a moulded surround and a hood mould. Inside, there is a large number of monuments.	I
Chantry Cottage; 54.20370°N 1.58972°W		13th century	The cottage is in stone with a pantile roof. The main front faces the river, it has two storeys and five bays, and the front facing the street has one storey. The left bay projects as a gabled wing with quoins, and contains a small square opening with a casement window above. On the right is a 13th-century doorway with a pointed arch. To its left are horizontally sliding sash windows with chamfered and moulded surrounds, and the windows elsewhere are casements.	II
Chantry House and Chantry House Cottage; 54.20378°N 1.58952°W		13th century	Two houses that have been altered and extended, in stone, rendered at the front, with quoins, and a roof of slate to the street and pantile towards the river. There are two storeys and three bays, the right bay slightly recessed. Between the left two bays is a doorway with pilasters, a fanlight, a frieze and a cornice, flanked by canted bay windows. To the right a flight of steps leads up to a doorway with pilasters, a frieze and a cornice. To its right and on the upper floor are sash windows. On the right is a lean-to with a cellar opening.	II
Marmion Tower; 54.20349°N 1.59107°W		14th century	A gatehouse, the only surviving part of a castle. It is in stone and has a square plan, three storeys, and fronts of one bay. On the east front is a large four-centred arch with a chamfered surround and a hood mould. Above it is a canted oriel window with two-light cusped openings and a hipped roof. Over this is a mullioned and transomed window with a hood mould, a moulded eaves band, and an embattled parapet. On the east front is a corbelled garderobe, and clasping the northwest corner is a four-stage stair tower.	I
Briar and Jasmine Cottages; 54.20409°N 1.59393°W		Early 18th century	A pair of cottages in rendered stone with a pantile roof. There are two storeys and five bays. On the front are two doorways, there is one casement window, and the other windows are horizontally sliding sashes, some with chamfered surrounds.	II
Tanfield Bridge; 54.20364°N 1.58810°W		1734	The bridge carries the A6108 road over the River Ure, with the east side dating from the late 18th century. The west side has three segmental arches with voussoirs and hood moulds. There are triangular cutwaters rising to pilasters, round end piers with semi-spherical caps, a band, and a parapet with flat copings. The east side is similar but has banded and rusticated stonework.	II
Prospect House; 54.20521°N 1.58312°W	—	Early to mid-18th century	The house is in stone, with quoins, and a concrete slate roof with shaped kneelers and stone coping. There are two storeys and four bays. The doorway has a quoined surround and a lintel with a projecting keystone. There is one small casement window, and the other windows are sashes.	II
Kiln Farmhouse; 54.21735°N 1.57539°W	—	18th century	The farmhouse is in stone, with quoins on the left, and a pantile roof. There are two storeys and three bays. On the front is a doorway flanked by casement windows, and the upper floor has horizontally sliding sash windows.	II
The Bull Inn; 54.20402°N 1.58872°W		18th century	The public house is in stone, with quoins, and a pantile roof with stone coping. There are two storeys and four bays, the left two bays lower, recessed and smaller. On the second bay is a doorway, to its left is a re-set dated stone, and the windows are horizontally sliding sashes.	II
The Chantry and The Little Chantry; 54.20365°N 1.59005°W		18th century	Two cottages in stone, with a roof partly of pantile with stone slates at the eaves, and partly in slate. There are two storeys and five bays, the right two bays slightly lower. On the front is a heavy gabled stone porch with a pointed arch, stone coping and a ball finial. To its left is a doorway with a stone lintel, and most of the windows are casements.	II
1 Chapel Row; 54.21891°N 1.57556°W	—	Mid to late 18th century	The house is in stone, and has a pantile roof with stone slates at the eaves. There are two storeys and two bays. The doorway is on the left and the windows are sashes.	II
2 Church Street; 54.20397°N 1.58889°W		Late 18th century	The house is in stone, with quoins, and a steep pantile roof with raised gables. There are two storeys and two bays. In the centre is a doorway flanked by casement windows, and on the upper floor are sash windows. All the openings have stone lintels.	II
The Freemasons' Arms; 54.21935°N 1.57608°W		Late 18th century	The public house is in painted stone, with stone dressings, and a pantile roof with stone coping on the right. There are two storeys and three bays. On the front are two doorways, the windows are sashes, all but one horizontally sliding, and all the openings have stone lintels.	II
3, 4 and 5 Church Street; 54.20390°N 1.58914°W		Early 19th century	A row of three cottages in stone with quoins and a pantile roof. There are two storeys and five bays. On the front are three doorways and sash windows.	II
2, 3 and 4 Chapel Row; 54.21881°N 1.57554°W	—	Early 19th century	A row of three cottages in red brick with a stone slate roof. There are two storeys, and each cottage has one bay. On the front are doorways with fanlights, the windows are sashes, and all the openings have flat stucco arches.	II
Camp House; 54.21330°N 1.57003°W	—	Early 19th century	A farmhouse in stone, with quoins, and a stone slate roof with shaped kneelers and stone coping. There are two storeys and three bays. The doorway has a fanlight, the windows are sashes, and all the openings have flat stone arches.	II
Low Haw Leas; 54.20144°N 1.60382°W		Early 19th century	The farmhouse is in stone, with quoins, and a stone slate roof with shaped kneelers and stone coping. There are two storeys and three bays. In the centre is a porch with a doorway, and the windows are horizontally sliding sashes.	II
Old Wesleyan Chapel; 54.20647°N 1.59067°W		Early 19th century	The chapel, later used for other purposes, is in stone, with quoins, and a stone slate roof with shaped kneelers and stone coping. There are two storeys and three bays. In the centre is a round-arched doorway with a plain surround, a radial fanlight, impost bands and a keystone. The windows are sashes, those on the ground floor with round-headed arches, impost bands and keystones, and those on the upper floor with plain surrounds and lintels.	II
Sunnyside and Orchard Cottage; 54.20411°N 1.59364°W		Early 19th century	A pair of cottages in stone, with quoins, and a pantile roof with stone coping. There are two storeys and four bays. On the front are two doorways, the left with a latticed gabled porch. The windows are horizontally sliding sashes, and all the openings have stone lintels.	II
The Bruce Arms Inn; 54.20485°N 1.58942°W		Early 19th century	The public house is in stone, and has a stone slate roof with shaped kneelers and stone coping. There are two storeys and three bays. The central doorway has pilasters, impost bands, a frieze and a cornice, and the windows are sashes with plain lintels.	II
Stables, The Bruce Arms Inn; 54.20494°N 1.58985°W		Early 19th century	The stable building is in stone, and has a stone slate roof with shaped kneelers, stone coping, and a weathervane on the apex. It has an L-shaped plan, and contains garage doors, wagon board doorways with segmental arches, and other board doorways.	II
The Estate House; 54.20379°N 1.59445°W		Early 19th century	The house is in stone, and has a stone slate roof with stone coping. There are two storeys and three bays. In the centre is a doorway, the windows on the front are horizontally sliding sashes, and all the openings have stone lintels. On the left return is a doorway with pilasters, a fanlight, a frieze, and a cornice on decorative brackets, and the windows are sashes.	II
Village Farmhouse; 54.21786°N 1.57489°W		Early 19th century	The farmhouse is in rendered stone, with stone dressings, and a stone slate roof with stone coping. There are two storeys and three bays. On the front is a wooden latticed porch with a modillion cornice, and the windows are horizontally sliding sashes.	II
1-8 Long Row; 54.20513°N 1.58606°W		Early to mid-19th century	A row of eight cottages with quoins and a pantile roof. There are two storeys and each cottage has a single bay. On the front are doorways and horizontally sliding sash windows.	II
