= Freemason (disambiguation) =

A Freemason is a member of the worldwide fraternal organization known as Freemasonry.

Freemason or Freemasons may also refer to:

- Freemason (horse), an Australian racehorse
- Freemasons (DJs), a dance/house/electronica production team from England
- "Free Mason" (song), a song by American rapper Rick Ross from his album Teflon Don
- "Freemason (You Broke the Promise)", a song by Boxcar on their album Vertigo
- Freemasons' Arms, a public house in Nosterfield, North Yorkshire, England
