= Thornberry =

Thornberry may refer to:

People

- Thornberry (surname)

Other

- Thornberry, Texas, an unincorporated community
- Thornberry Animal Sanctuary, Yorkshire, England

== See also ==
- Thornbury (disambiguation)
