= Chantry House and Chantry Cottage =

Buildings in West Tanfield, North Yorkshire, England

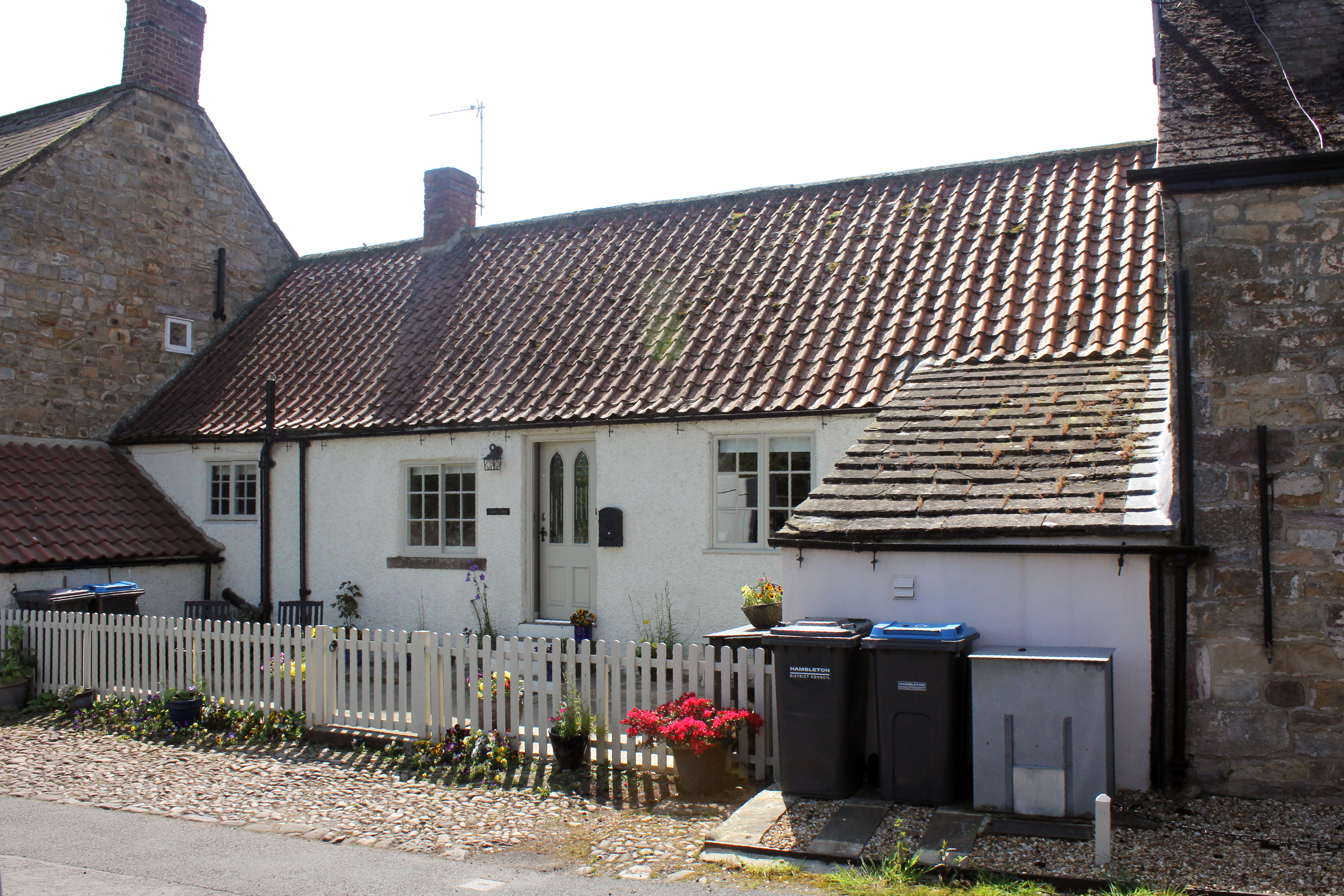
- Chantry Cottage in 2023

- Location within North Yorkshire

General information
- Location: Church Street, West Tanfield, North Yorkshire, England
- Coordinates: 54.2037°N 1.5896°W
- Year built: 13th century
- Renovated: 17th century (rebuilt); 19th and 20th century (altered)

Listed Building – Grade II
- Official name: Chantry Cottage
- Designated: 5 May 1952
- Reference no.: 1190284

Listed Building – Grade II
- Official name: Chantry House and Chantry House Cottage
- Designated: 22 August 1966
- Reference no.: 1150880

Chantry House and Chantry Cottage are historic buildings on Church Street in West Tanfield, a village in North Yorkshire, England.

A chantry chapel dedicated to Mary, mother of Jesus, was founded in St Nicholas' Church, West Tanfield, by Avis Marmion in 1281. After the Maud Marmion died around 1330, her husband John founded a charity to support three priests to pray for her soul, in the chapel. A house was constructed nearby to accommodate them and a servant, which served this purpose until the English Reformation, after which it became a private house. In the 17th century, it was largely rebuilt as three properties, that on the left becoming known as "Chantry Cottage" and retaining half of the original ground floor, while the two on the right, "Chantry House" and "Chantry House Cottage", only retained the lowest part of the stonework. Chantry Cottage was altered in the 18th century, while Chantry House and Chantry House Cottage were combined into one house in the 19th century. Both were further altered in the 20th century, with Chantry House and Chantry House Cottage again being divided into separate houses. Chantry Cottage was Grade II listed in 1952, while Chantry House and Chantry House Cottage were jointly Grade II listed in 1966.

== Chantry Cottage ==
The cottage is built of stone with a pantile roof. The main front faces the River Ure, it has two storeys and five bays, and the front facing the street has one storey. The left bay projects as a gabled wing with quoins, and contains a small square opening with a casement window above. On the right is a 13th-century doorway with a pointed arch, shared with Chantry House. To its left are horizontally sliding sash windows with chamfered and moulded surrounds, and the windows elsewhere are casements.

== Chantry House and Chantry House Cottage ==
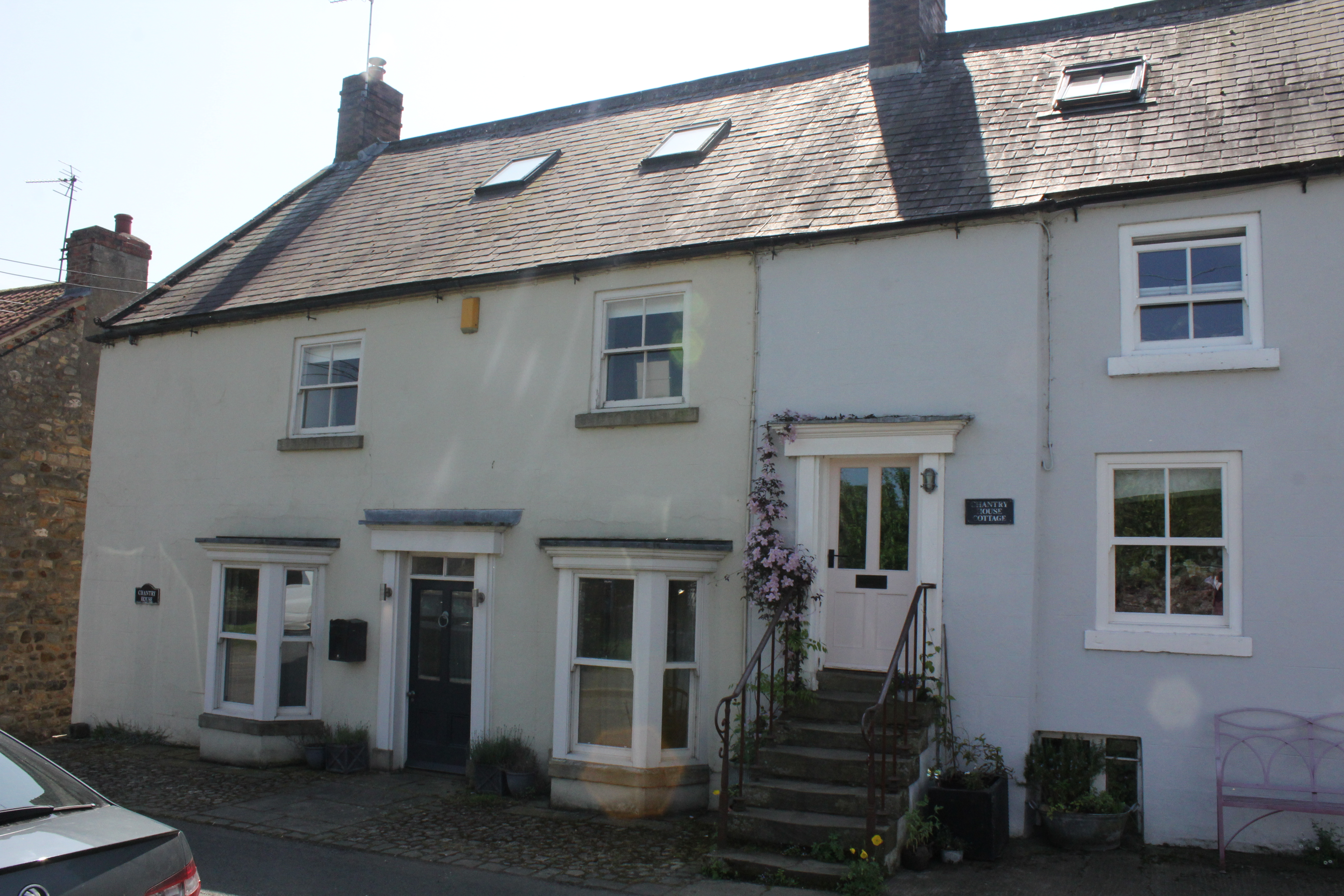
Chantry House and Chantry House Cottage

The houses are built of stone, rendered at the front, with quoins, and a roof of slate to the street and pantile towards the river. There are two storeys and three bays, the right bay slightly recessed. Between the left two bays is a doorway with pilasters, a fanlight, a frieze and a cornice, flanked by canted bay windows. To the right a flight of steps leads up to a doorway with pilasters, a frieze and a cornice. To its right and on the upper floor are sash windows. On the right is a lean-to with a cellar opening. In the cellar are remains of a monk's cell and a large inglenook.

== See also ==
- Listed buildings in West Tanfield
