= Bruce Arms =

Pub in West Tanfield, North Yorkshire, England

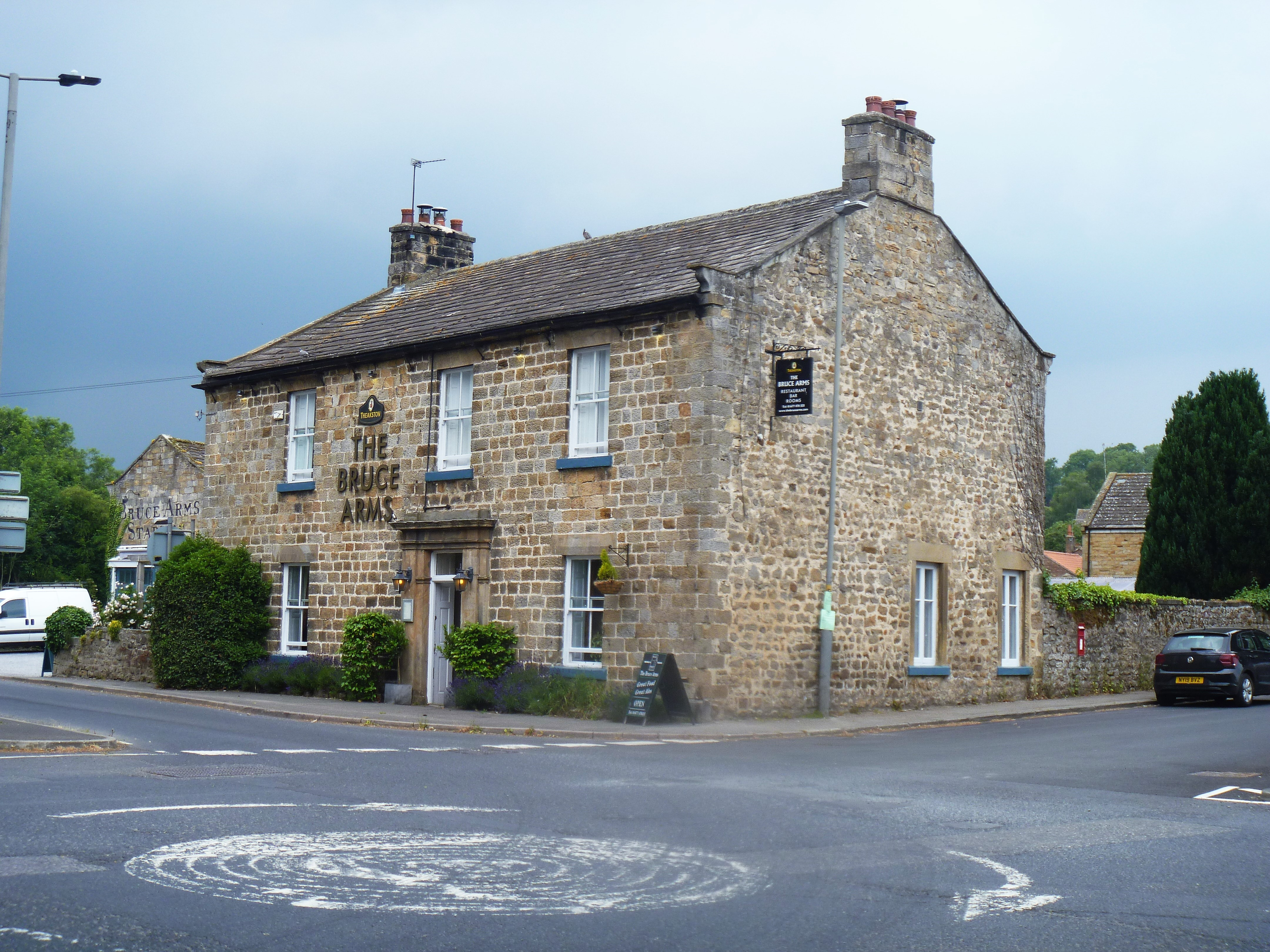
- The pub in 2022

- Location within North Yorkshire

General information
- Type: Public house
- Location: Main Street, West Tanfield, North Yorkshire, England
- Coordinates: 54.2049°N 1.5894°W
- Year built: Early 19th century

Website
- thebrucearms.com

Listed Building – Grade II
- Official name: The Bruce Arms Inn
- Designated: 30 August 1988
- Reference no.: 1190348

Listed Building – Grade II
- Official name: Stables to the Bruce Arms Inn
- Designated: 30 August 1988
- Reference no.: 1150779

The Bruce Arms is a historic pub on Main Street in West Tanfield, a village in North Yorkshire, England.

The coaching inn and its stables were built in the early 19th century. Its name comes from the Earls of Ailesbury, who owned land in the area and had the family name "Bruce", although the pub sign alludes to the story of Robert the Bruce and a spider. The pub was Grade II listed in 1988. During the 2014 Tour de France, it was visited by William, Prince of Wales and his family. In 2018, it came third in Visit England's Awards for Excellence for the best tourism pub. At the time, it was under the same ownership as the Bull Inn, and was mostly run as a restaurant.

The pub is built of stone, and has a stone slate roof with shaped kneelers and stone coping. It has two storeys and is three bays wide. The central doorway has pilasters, impost bands, a frieze and a cornice, and the windows are sashes with plain lintels. Inside, it has flagstones on the floor and there is a hearth in the bar.

The pub's stable building is also Grade II listed. It is built of stone, and has a stone slate roof with shaped kneelers, stone coping, and a weathervane on the apex. It has an L-shaped plan, and contains garage doors, wagon board doorways with segmental arches, and other board doorways.

== See also ==
- Listed buildings in West Tanfield
