= Marmion Tower =

15th-century gatehouse in England

- West Tanfield, North Yorkshire, England
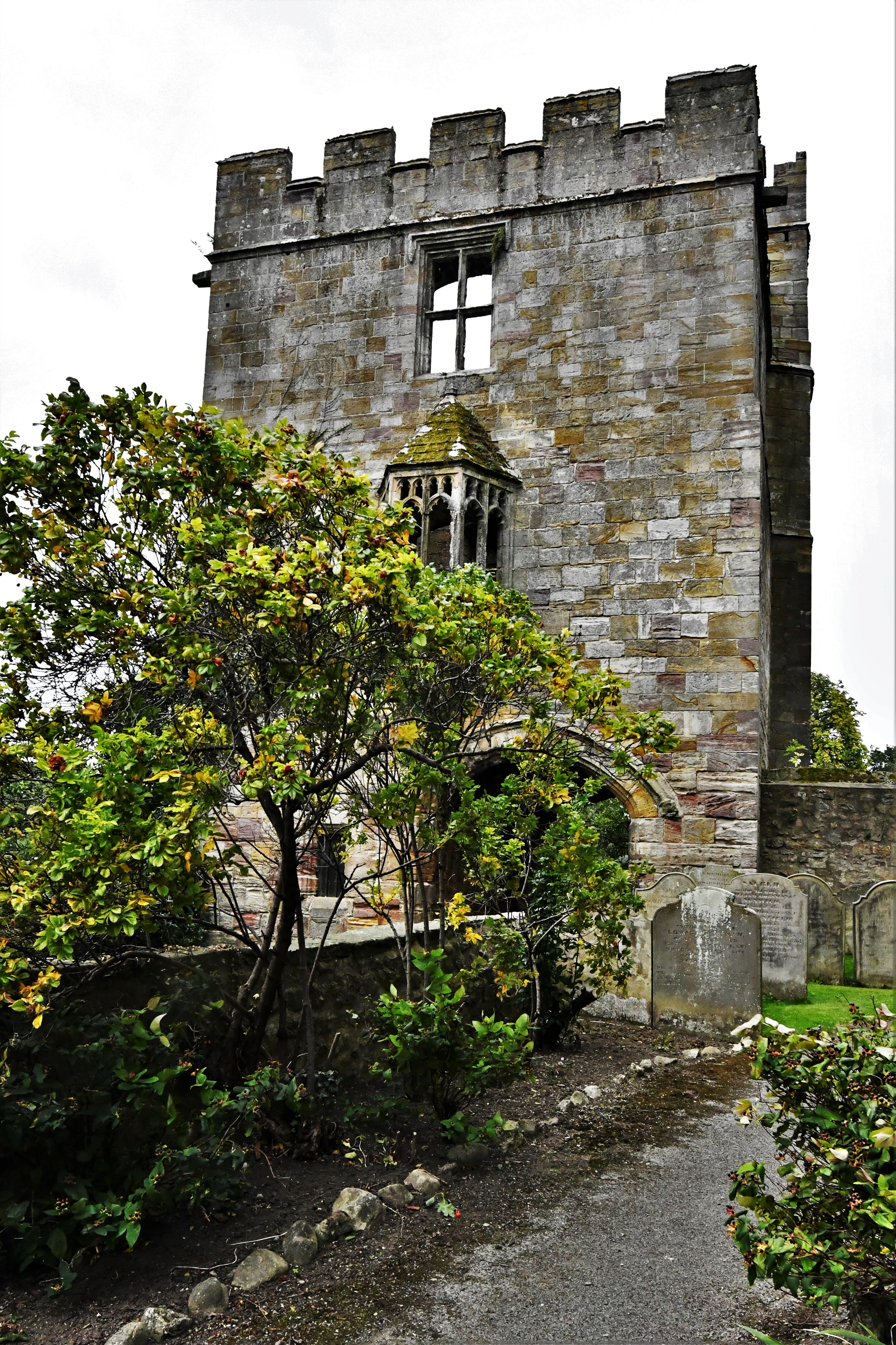
- Marmion Tower, seen from the east

Site information
- Type: Gatehouse
- Owner: English Heritage
- Open to the public: Yes
- Condition: Ruined

Location
- Shown within North Yorkshire
- Coordinates: 54.2034°N 1.5937°W grid reference SE 266 787

Site history
- Materials: Magnesian limestone

Marmion Tower, also known historically as Tanfield Castle, is a 15th-century gatehouse near the village of West Tanfield in North Yorkshire, England. It survived the destruction of the surrounding fortified manor and is now managed by English Heritage.

== History ==
Marmion Tower is a stone gatehouse, built in the early 15th century as the entrance to the fortified manor of West Tanfield. West Tanfield occupied a strategic crossing point on the north bank of the River Ure, and Sir John Marmion and later his daughter-in-law Maud were given licences by the Crown to crenellate the manor house there in 1314 and 1348 respectively. The Fitzhugh family in Ravensworth inherited the property in 1387, and Sir William FitzHugh, 4th Baron FitzHugh probably then constructed the new gatehouse.

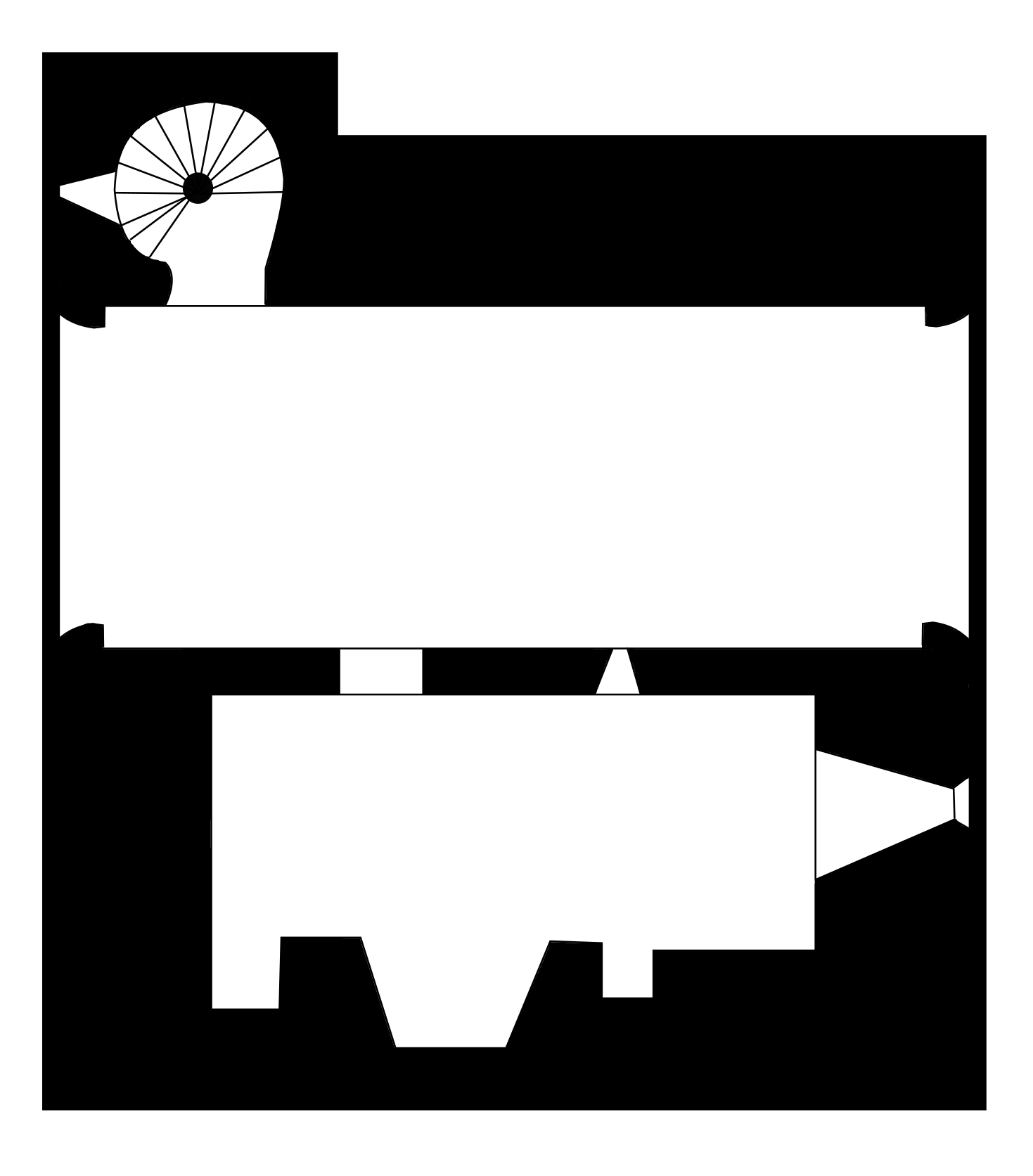
Plan of the ground floor

When the antiquary John Leland visited the site in the mid-16th century, he described how "the castelle of Tanfeld, or rather as it is nowe, a meane manor Place, stondith hard on the ripe of Ure, wher I saw no notable building but a fair toured Gateway and a Haule of squarid stone."

The tower and the manor passed into the Parr family and, on the death of William Parr, 1st Marquess of Northampton (brother of Queen Katherine), into the hands of the Crown, before being held by the Cecils and the Elgins. The Brudenell family owned it from 1747 onwards, until in 1886 it was sold to Mr. Thomas Arton. It was sketched around 1786 by William Grose.

By 1786, the rest of the manor except for the gatehouse had been destroyed; Grose recorded a local tradition stating that Thomas Cecil and Sir Christopher Wandesford had used the stone in the construction of Snape Castle and Kirklington Hall respectively in the late 16th century. In 1976, the tower passed into the guardianship of the state and was then restored and opened to the public. In the 21st century it is operated by English Heritage and protected under UK law as a Grade I listed building and scheduled monument.

== Architecture ==
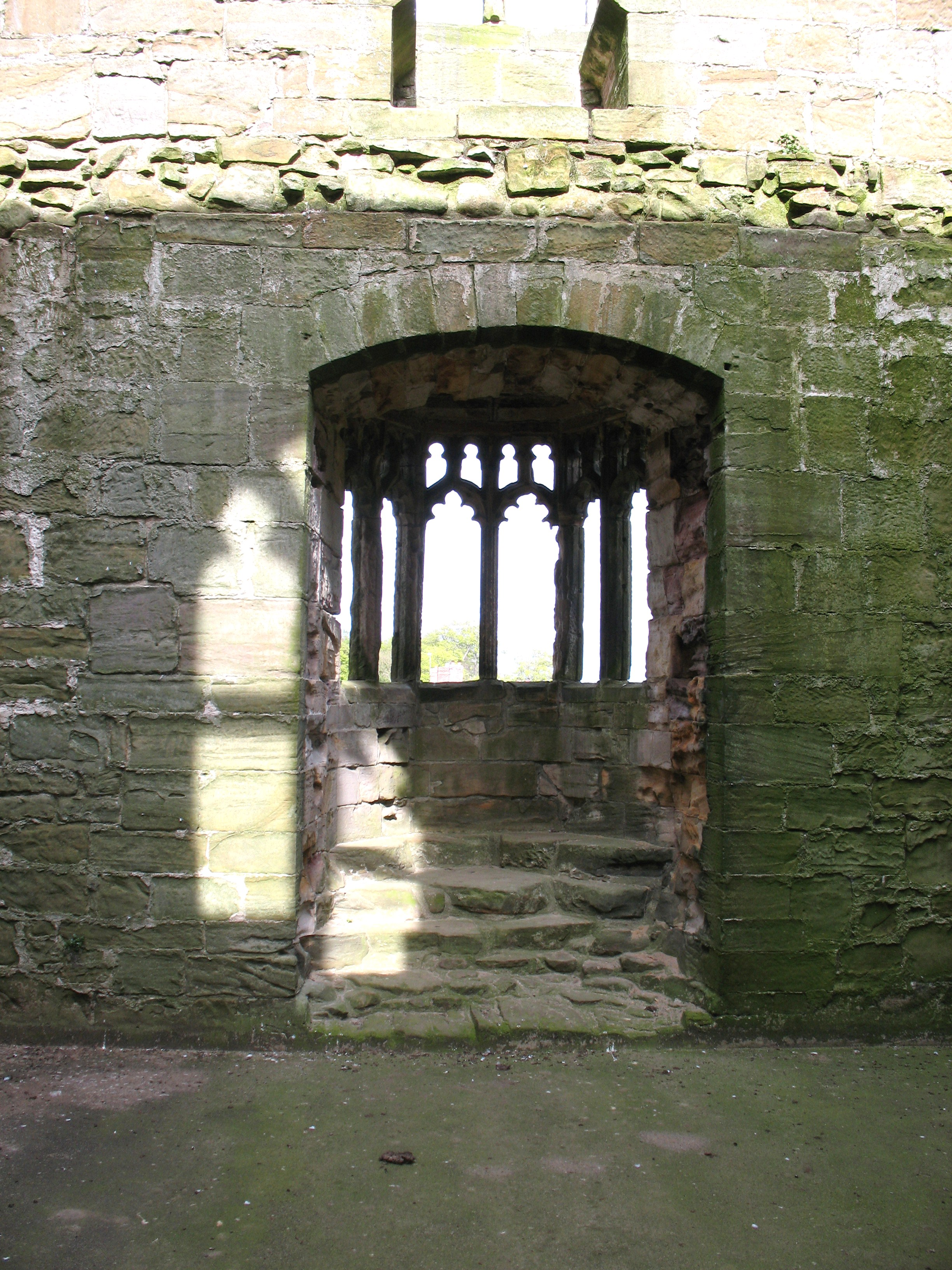
Oriel window, Marmion Tower

The tower is three storeys high, 34 by 31 feet (10.4 by 9.4 m) across and built from magnesian limestone; it was raised in height at some point after its original construction. A vaulted passageway 10 feet (3.0 m) wide runs through one side of the gatehouse, which would originally have been protected by an outer pair of doors. On the ground floor, the tower contained a vaulted porter's lodge, 20 by 8 feet (6.1 by 2.4 m) wide, with a fireplace, latrine and a "squint" to allow the porter to look into the passageway. A newel staircase in the north-west corner connected to the first and second floors. The first floor has a fireplace and an ornate oriel window, added after the original construction, looking east; Pevsner considered this "must be Elizabethan at the earliest." The second floor has another fireplace, a latrine and three windows with stone seats. The roof has since been lost, but its battlements and stair turret still survive. As well as acting as a gatehouse, the tower would originally have provided self-contained accommodation, possibly serving as a private apartment.

== See also ==
- Grade I listed buildings in North Yorkshire (district)
- Listed buildings in West Tanfield

== Bibliography ==
- Emery, Anthony (1996). Greater Medieval Houses of England and Wales, 1300–1500: Volume 1, Northern England. Cambridge, UK: Cambridge University Press. ISBN 9780521497237.
- Grose, Francis (1787). The Antiquities of England and Wales, Volume 8. London, UK: S. Hooper. OCLC 624517723.
- Pevsner, Nikolaus (1966). Yorkshire: The North Riding. The Buildings of England. London, UK: Penguin Books. OCLC 691229072.
