= Bull Inn, West Tanfield =

Pub in West Tanfield, North Yorkshire, England

Bull Inn
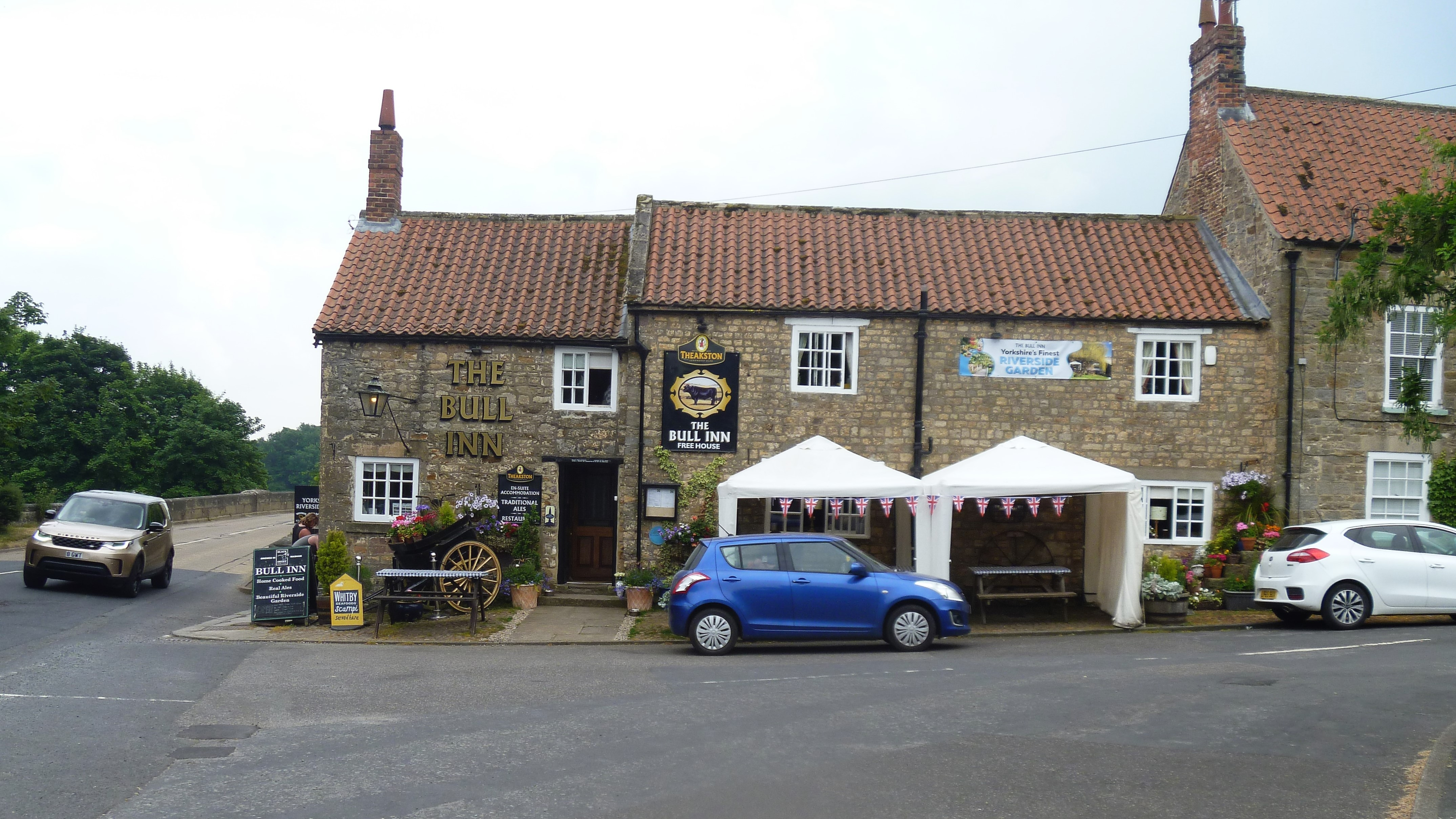
- The pub in 2022

- Location within North Yorkshire

General information
- Type: Public house
- Location: Church Street, West Tanfield, North Yorkshire, England
- Coordinates: 54.2040°N 1.5887°W
- Year built: 1699 (probable)
- Renovated: Early 19th century (altered)

Website
- thebullwesttanfield.co.uk

Listed Building – Grade II
- Official name: The Bull Inn
- Designated: 22 August 1966
- Reference no.: 1293843

The Bull Inn is a historic pub on Church Street in West Tanfield, a village in North Yorkshire, England.

The pub was probably built in 1699; a reset datestone is to the left of one of the doors. It is believed to be on the site of a former ferryman's cottage. It was altered in the early 19th century, and was Grade II listed in 1966. In 2016, it was voted as Yorkshire's favourite pub, in a Welcome to Yorkshire contest. At the time, it was under the same ownership as the village's other pub, the Bruce Arms, but its lease was sold to other tenants in 2025. In 2023, The Times named it as having one of Britain's best riverside beer gardens.

The pub is built of stone, with quoins, and a pantile roof with stone coping. It has two storeys and is four bays wide, the left two bays lower, recessed and smaller. On the second bay is a doorway, to its left is a re-set dated stone, and the windows are horizontally sliding sashes. Inside, it has wooden ceiling beams, slate flooring and a fireplace in the main bar, a separate dining area, and five rooms to let.

== See also ==
- Listed buildings in West Tanfield
