= St Nicholas' Church, West Tanfield =

Church in West Tanfield, North Yorkshire, England

Coordinates: 54.2037°N 1.5906°W

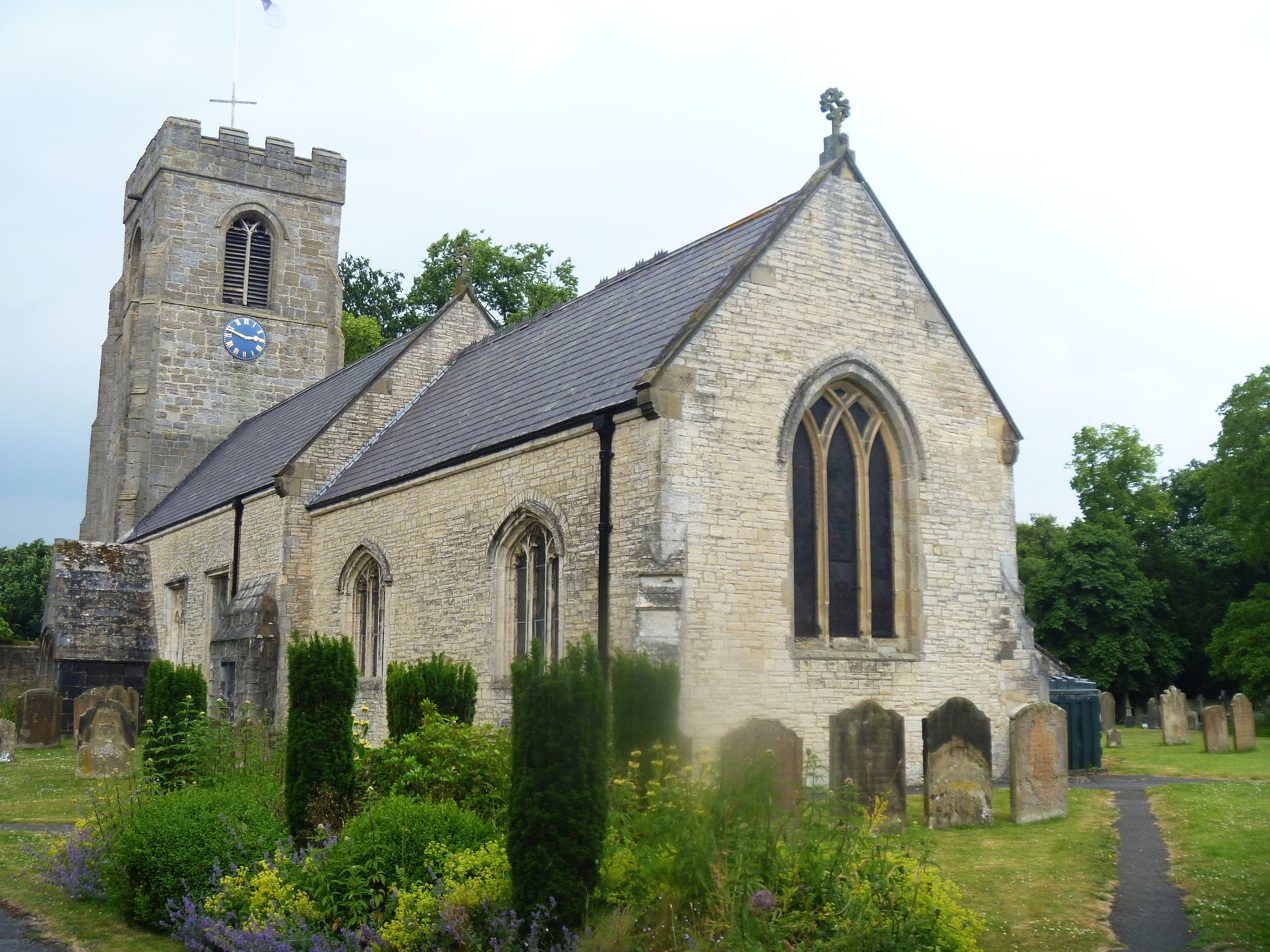
The church, in 2022

St Nicholas' Church is the parish church of West Tanfield, a village in North Yorkshire, in England.

The church was built in the early 13th century, with a north aisle added later in the century. The north chapel, tower and porch were added in the 15th century, and the chancel was extended. The church was restored in 1859–60 by T. H. Wyatt. The building was grade I listed in 1966.

The church is built of stone with a Welsh slate roof, and consists of a nave, a south porch, a north aisle with a vestry, a chancel and a west tower. The tower has three stages and is in Perpendicular style. It has diagonal buttresses, a west window with a pointed arch and a hood mould, bands, clock faces, two-light bell openings with hood moulds, and a projecting embattled parapet. The porch dates from about 1200, and has a round-arched doorway with a moulded surround and a hood mould. Inside, stone monuments include an effigy of William Marmion, who died in 1275; a 13th-century knight and 14th-century woman under a canopy; a late-14th century woman; and a woman on a tomb chest. There is also an alabaster effigy of John Marmion, who died in 1387, his wife, and a dog, under a contemporary iron hearse, this believed to be unique in England on a tomb of this date. There is some 15th-century stained glass in the windows of the north aisle.

== See also ==
- Grade I listed buildings in North Yorkshire (district)
- Listed buildings in West Tanfield
