= Binsoe =

Hamlet in Hambleton District, North Yorkshire, England

Coordinates: 54.214°N 1.617°W

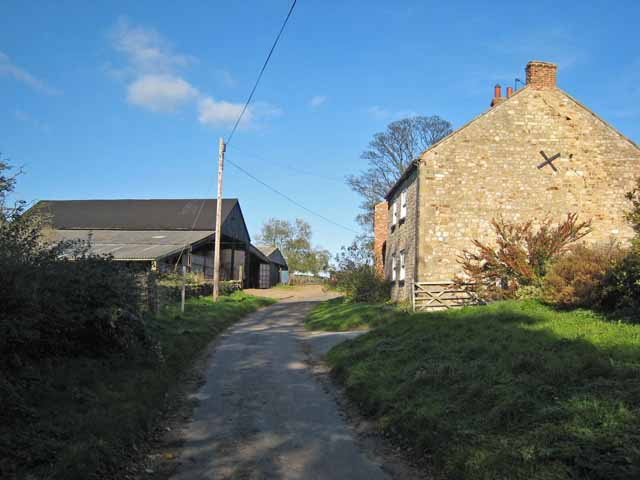
- Farm buildings at Binsoe

- Location within North Yorkshire
- OS grid reference: SE250798
- Civil parish: West Tanfield
- Unitary authority: North Yorkshire
- Ceremonial county: North Yorkshire
- Region: Yorkshire and the Humber
- Country: England
- Sovereign state: United Kingdom
- Post town: RIPON
- Postcode district: HG
- Dialling code: 01677
- Police: North Yorkshire
- Fire: North Yorkshire
- Ambulance: Yorkshire

Binsoe is a hamlet in the civil parish of West Tanfield, North Yorkshire, England. The hamlet is just to the north of the A6108 road, being 1.25 miles (2 km) north west of West Tanfield, and 2 miles (3.2 km) south east of Masham. During the First World War, a field to the east of the hamlet was used as a landing ground for the Royal Flying Corps (later, the Royal Air Force).

== History ==
Binsoe was not recorded in the Domesday Book, but was listed as Binzhou in 1190. The name is believed to have derived from a personal name such as Binteshou. Other variants have been recorded as Bishou in 1202, Bynshu in 1301, and Bynsoo in 1536. The hamlet used to be in the Wapentake of Hallikeld, but was later in the Bedale Rural District. From 1974 to 2023 it was part of the Hambleton District, it is now administered by the unitary North Yorkshire Council.

In the Victoria County History book on the North Riding from 1914, a description is made about the road that runs through the hamlet; "where the lane makes a loop round a curious tree-covered mound". This is a round barrow dated from the Late Neolithic period to the Late Bronze Age, and is now a scheduled monument.

Between December 1916 and June 1919, a field to the east of Binsoe was used by No. 76 Squadron in the Home Defence role. The total area was 35 acres (14 ha) with a landing ground measuring 400 yards (370 m) by 380 yards (350 m), although no permanent buildings were erected on the site, and its use would have been sporadic due to its designation as a relief landing ground for nearby RAF Ripon. After disuse, the field was converted back for agricultural purposes.

Binsoe hamlet is just north of the A6108 road that connects Ripon with Leyburn and Richmond. The road through the hamlet connects with the B6267 road to the north. For census purposes, the hamlet is recorded within the civil parish of West Tanfield.
