= Hagworthingham =

Village and civil parish in the East Lindsey district of Lincolnshire, England

Coordinates: 53.203159°N 0.010807°E

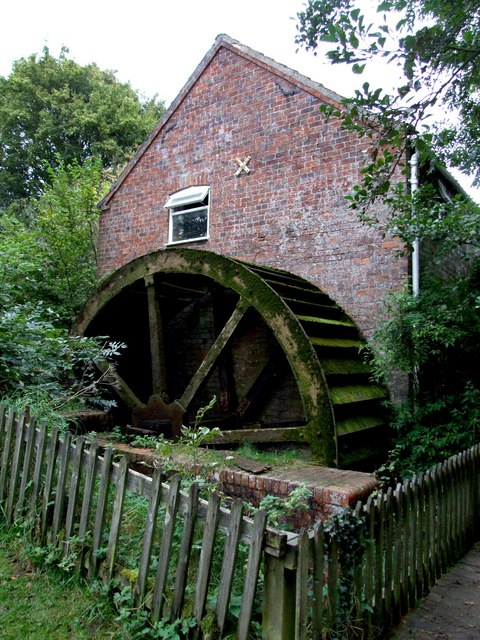
- Stockwith Mill, Hagworthingham

- Location within Lincolnshire
- Population: 359 (2011)
- OS grid reference: TF344692
  - London: 115 mi (185 km) S
- District: East Lindsey
- Shire county: Lincolnshire
- Region: East Midlands
- Country: England
- Sovereign state: United Kingdom
- Post town: Spilsby
- Postcode district: PE23
- Police: Lincolnshire
- Fire: Lincolnshire
- Ambulance: East Midlands
- UK Parliament: Louth and Horncastle

Hagworthingham is a village and civil parish in the East Lindsey district of Lincolnshire, England. It is on the A158, 5 miles (8 km) east of Horncastle and 4 miles (6 km) north-west of Spilsby. In 2011 the parish had a population of 359.

The place-name 'Hagworthingham' is attested in the Domesday Book of 1086, where it appears as "Haberdingham" and "Hacberding(e)ham" according to Ekwall, which states the name means 'the ham [village] of the Hagworth people'. According to Mills, Domesday assigns it "Hacberdingeham", and gives an 1198 reference of "Hagwrthingham", meaning possibly "homestead of the family or followers of a man called Haguweard", from the Old English combination of a person name with 'inga' (denoting ownership) and 'hām' (homestead, village manor or estate).

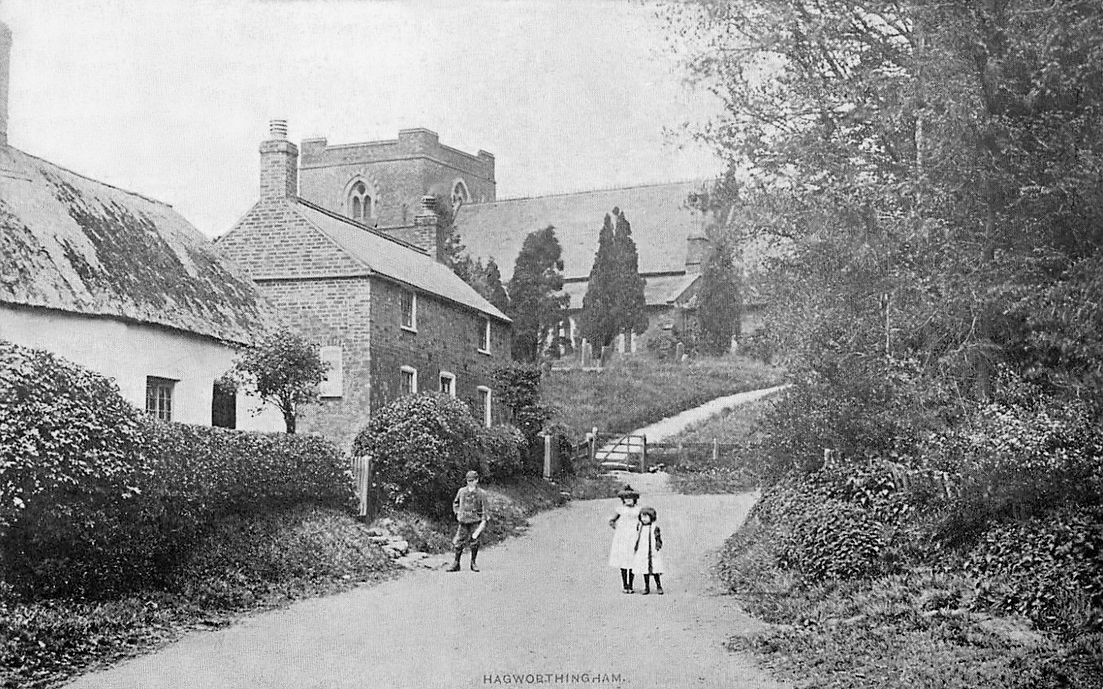
Road to Holy Trinity Church before the First World War

Hagworthingham church, dedicated to the Holy Trinity, was restored by James Fowler of Louth in 1859.

Thomas Drant, the clergyman and translator of Horace, was born in Hagworthingham.

== See also ==
- Thornbury Hill
