= Thornborough Henges =

Neolithic henge complex in North Yorkshire, England

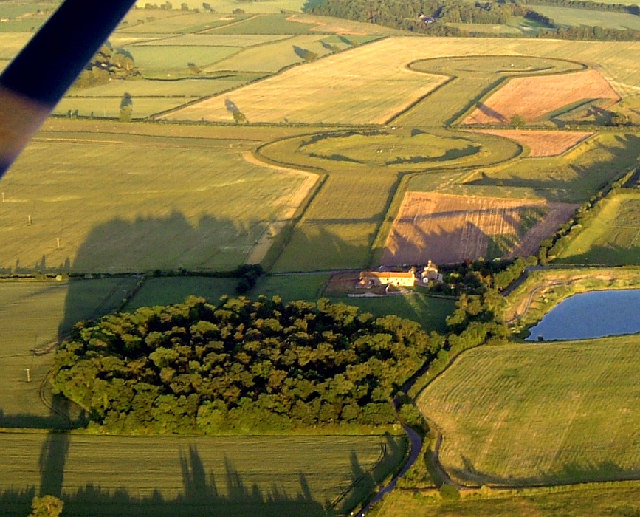
- The three henges of the Thornborough Henges complex, looking south
- Interactive map of Thornborough Henges
- 54°12′36″N 1°33′50″W
- Type: Archaeological site
- Location: England, United Kingdom

History
- Built: c. 3000 BC

The Thornborough Henges are an ancient monument complex that includes the three aligned henges that give the site its name. They are located on a raised plateau above the River Ure near the village of Thornborough in North Yorkshire, England. The site includes many large ancient structures including a cursus, henges, burial grounds and settlements.

They are thought to have been part of a Neolithic and Bronze Age 'ritual landscape' comparable to Salisbury Plain and date from between 3500 and 2500 BC. The monument complex has been called 'The Stonehenge of the North'. Historic England considers its landscape comparable in ceremonial importance to better known sites such as Stonehenge, Avebury, and Orkney.

Concern over the impact on the ritual landscape of quarrying by Tarmac in the 21st century, led to negotiations between Tarmac and Historic England. Following an agreement originally reached in 2016, the two henges owned by Tarmac, as well as surrounding land owned by local company Lightwater Holdings, passed into the control of Historic England in 2023. The site is now managed by English Heritage and is publicly accessible. The third, most northerly, henge remained in private ownership at the time of the original agreement but in February 2024 English Heritage announced that it had acquired it.

== Location ==
The Thornborough Henges are located on a plateau above the River Ure near the village of Thornborough in North Yorkshire, England.

== Cursus ==
The cursus is the oldest and largest ancient monument at Thornborough. It is almost a mile in extent and runs from Thornborough village, under the (later) central henge and terminates close to the River Ure in a broadly east/west alignment, 8 kilometres (5 mi) north-west of Ripon.

Cursuses are perhaps the most enigmatic of ancient monuments. They typically comprise two parallel ditches, the larger of which can be a mile or more in extent, cut to create a "cigar-shaped" enclosure. Typically, burial mounds and mortuary enclosures are found alongside cursus monuments, indicating that they probably had a ceremonial function. Its age and status, alongside other ancient monuments of its kind, has led to the site being labelled as "the Stonehenge of the North".

== Henges ==
The monument complex has been called 'The Stonehenge of the North'. Historic England considers its landscape comparable in ceremonial importance to better known sites such as Stonehenge and surrounding Avebury, and the Orkney monuments.

The three henges are almost identical in size and composition, each having a diameter of approximately 240 metres (790 ft) and two large entrances situated directly opposite each other. The henges are located around 550 metres (1,800 ft) apart on an approximate northwest-southeast alignment, although there is a curious 'dogleg' in the layout. Altogether, the monument extends for more than a mile.

Archaeological excavation of the central henge has taken place. It has been suggested that its banks were covered with locally mined gypsum, with the resulting white sheen being striking and visible for miles around. A double alignment of pits, possibly evidence of a timber processional avenue, extends from the southern henge.

The 'dogleg' in the layout appears to cause the layout of the henges to mirror the three stars of Orion's Belt. The exact purpose of the henges is unclear though archaeological finds suggest that they served economic and social purposes as well as astronomical ones. It also reflects the different perpendicular alignments of midwinter sunset and midsummer sunrise. One of the legs also aligns, via another henge site at Nunwick with the Devil's Arrows 17.7 km away at Boroughbridge.

The Northern henge is currently overgrown with trees but is one of the best preserved henges in Britain. The Central and Southern henges are in poorer condition although the banks of the henges are still quite prominent, especially in the case of the Central henge. To gain a full appreciation of the scale of the monument it is best viewed from the air. Thornborough Henges is a scheduled monument.

== Beltane ==
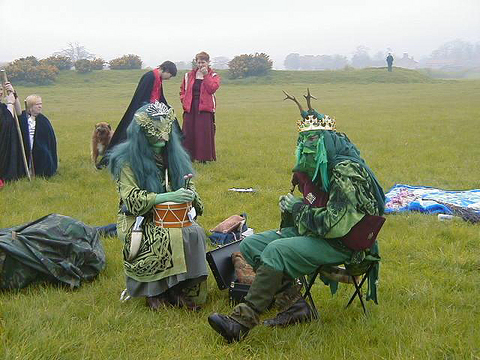
The May King and Queen, Thornborough Central Henge, Beltane, 1 May 2005

All three of the Thornborough henges and the narrow strip of land connecting them are scheduled monuments. However, prior to the 2023 transfer of the properties (see below) the owners of the site did not generally permit public access. Since 2004 an exception was made by then-landowner Tarmac that allowed people to attend an annual event in celebration of the Gaelic festival of Beltane.

== Quarrying and current status ==
Extensive quarrying has impacted much of the monument's setting to the north and west of the henges. The site lies within the wider Nosterfield quarry area being exploited for gravel by Tarmac Northern Ltd. In the early 21st century Tarmac planned to extend its quarrying operations to a 45-hectare (110-acre) site less than a mile east of the henges known as 'Ladybridge Farm'. Preliminary investigations of this area of land to discern its archaeological significance suggested that it may have been a location of ritual Neolithic encampments, possibly used by those people who built or visited the henges. Opponents of the plan claimed that if permission was granted for this area to be quarried, much of the remaining contextual information about the henges would be lost. A campaign led by local people and concerned archaeologists attempted to persuade Tarmac and North Yorkshire County Council to guarantee the protection of the area. British planning and archaeology guidelines prefer preservation in situ of archaeological remains. In cases where this is not possible, such as quarrying, preservation by record is an option, involving archaeological excavation. Campaigners argued that further excavation and subsequent quarrying will destroy the ritual landscape completely.

In 2002, Tarmac Northern Ltd. expressed an intention to apply for planning permission to quarry Thornborough Moor, thus intending to quarry right up to the edge of the designated scheduled monument area, which caused what The Times labelled as "unprecedented protests", and a 10,000 signature petition against the proposal. In March 2005, Tarmac stated it would not seek to apply for planning permission to quarry this site for at least ten years, the period covered by North Yorkshire County Council's Minerals Plan.

In February 2006, North Yorkshire County Council turned down Tarmac's application to expand quarrying to the Ladybridge Farm site. Later in 2006 Tarmac submitted a revised planning application to North Yorkshire County Council. The revised application for Ladybridge, which is adjacent to the Nosterfield Quarry, reduced the proposed area for sand and gravel extraction from 45 hectares to 31 hectares, avoiding the south west section of the site to address concerns raised about archaeology. The application was approved in February 2007.

Late in 2007 campaign group Friends of Thornborough requested a judicial review of the planning permission due to a number of procedural irregularities. In response, North Yorkshire County Council ruled the permission to be "fatally flawed," and withdrew the permission previously granted.

In November 2016, North Yorkshire County Council’s planning committee agreed with the owners Tarmac to approve further quarrying in return for preserving the site of the Thornborough Henges and 90 acres of surrounding land, which would eventually be handed over to a public body. This agreement saw control of the two henges on land owned by Tarmac pass to Historic England in February 2023. The site is operated by English Heritage and will enable public access. It will join the National Heritage Collection of English Heritage properties. In February 2024 English Heritage announced that it had acquired the third henge from its private owners.
