= Thornbury Hill =

Hill in Lincolnshire, England

Highest point
- Elevation: 77 m (253 ft)
- Coordinates: 53°12′29″N 0°01′23″E

Geography
- Location: Hagworthingham, Lincolnshire, England
- Parent range: Lincolnshire Wolds

Thornbury Hill is a hill in Hagworthingham, Lincolnshire, England.

There is a "probable prehistoric enclosure" on the north slope.
