= Thornbury (surname) =

Thornbury is a surname, and may refer to:

- Dave Thornbury (born 1948), American trick roper and saddle maker
- Gavin Thornbury (born 1993), Irish rugby union footballer
- George Walter Thornbury (1828–1876), English author
- Gregory Alan Thornbury (born 1970), American academic and administrator
- Rhys Thornbury (born 1990), New Zealand skeleton racer
- Scott Thornbury (born 1950), New Zealand academic and teacher trainer
- Tom Thornbury (born 1963), Canadian ice hockey player
- Walter de Thornbury (died 1313), English statesman and cleric
- Sam Thornbury (born 1999), showrunner of Battle for Dream Island: The Power of Two

== See also ==
- Thornberry (surname)
