= Freemasons' Arms =

Pub in Nosterfield, North Yorkshire, England

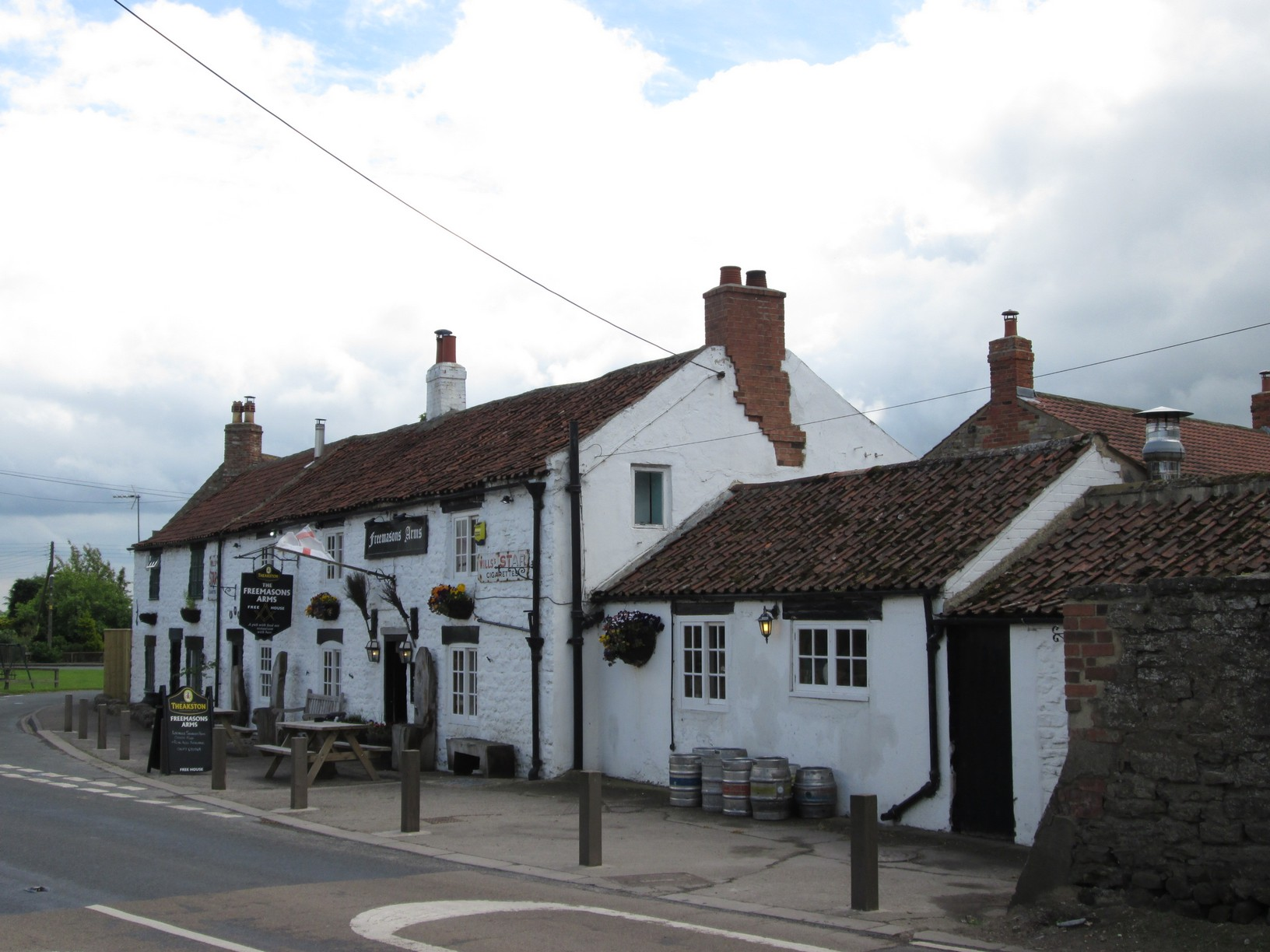
- The pub in 2013

- Location within North Yorkshire

General information
- Type: Public house
- Location: The Green, Nosterfield, North Yorkshire, England
- Coordinates: 54.2193°N 1.5761°W
- Year built: Late 18th century

Website
- thefreemasonsarms.co.uk

Listed Building – Grade II
- Official name: The Freemasons Arms
- Designated: 30 August 1988
- Reference no.: 1150778

The Freemasons' Arms is a historic pub on The Green in Nosterfield, a village in North Yorkshire, England.

The building was constructed in the late 18th century, and it became a pub in 1851. The building was Grade II listed in 1988. During the 2014 Tour de France, William, Prince of Wales and his family dined in the pub.

The public house is built of painted stone, with stone dressings, and a pantile roof with stone coping on the right. It has two storeys and is three bays wide. On the front are two doorways, the windows are sashes, all but one horizontally sliding, and all the openings have stone lintels.

== See also ==
- Listed buildings in West Tanfield
