= Thornberry (surname) =

Thornberry is a surname, and may refer to:

- Braden Thornberry (born 1997), American golfer
- Cedric Thornberry (1936–2014), Assistant-Secretary-General of the United Nations
- David Thornberry (1911–1995), bishop of Wyoming, United States
- Emily Thornberry (born 1960), British politician
- Homer Thornberry (1909–1995), American politician and judge
- Jason Thornberry (born 1971), American musician
- Mac Thornberry (born 1958), Texas politician (13th congressional district)
- Michael Thornberry (born 1972), American handball player
- Nancy Thornberry, American chemist
- Rick Thornberry (born 1968), Australian professional boxer
- Robert Desmond Thornberry (1907–1969), Canadian politician
- Terence Thornberry, American criminologist

== See also ==
- Thornbury (surname)
