= West Tanfield =

Village and civil parish in North Yorkshire, England

Coordinates: 54°12′18″N 1°35′21″W

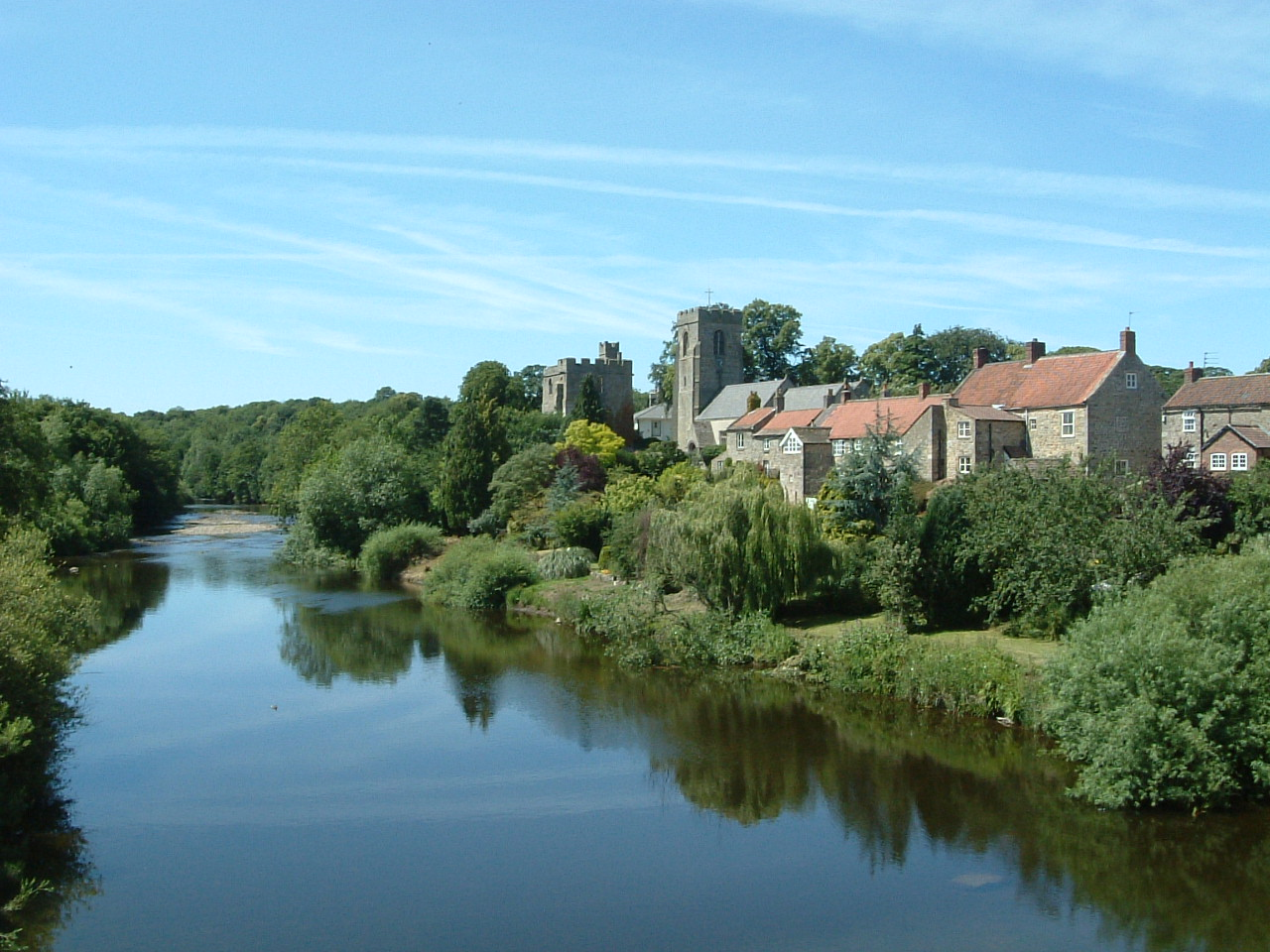
- West Tanfield from the River Ure bridge

- Location within North Yorkshire
- Population: 636 (including East Tanfield. 2011 census)
- OS grid reference: SE268788
- Unitary authority: North Yorkshire
- Ceremonial county: North Yorkshire
- Region: Yorkshire and the Humber
- Country: England
- Sovereign state: United Kingdom
- Post town: RIPON
- Postcode district: HG4
- Dialling code: 01677
- Police: North Yorkshire
- Fire: North Yorkshire
- Ambulance: Yorkshire
- UK Parliament: Thirsk and Malton

West Tanfield is a village and civil parish in the county of North Yorkshire, England. The village is situated approximately six miles north of Ripon on the A6108, which goes from Ripon to Masham and Wensleydale. The parish includes the hamlets of Nosterfield, Thornborough and Binsoe.

== History ==
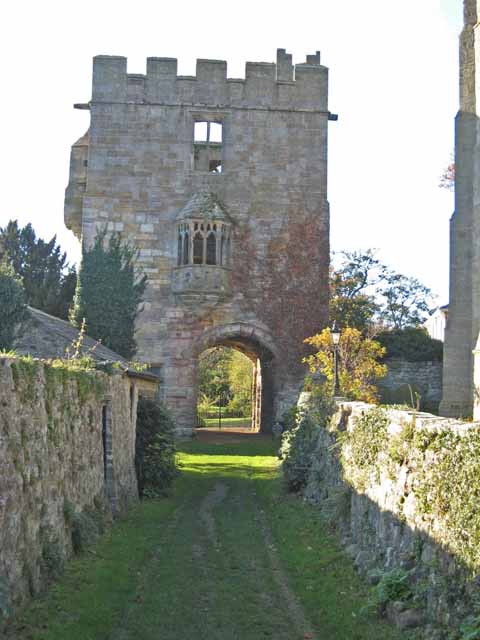
Marmion Tower, West Tanfield

The toponym is from the Old English tāna feld, meaning "open land where young shoots grow", or possibly "open land of a man called Tana". The village is mentioned in the Domesday Book as Tanefeld. The manor was owned by Thorkil at the time of the Norman invasion, but were afterwards granted to Count Alan of Brittany. The manor was held by Hugh, son of Gernegan thereafter and his heirs until at least 1243. One of these heirs, a woman named Avis had married Robert Marmion and held the manor in 1287. The Marmion family held the manor until 1387 when it passed to the next line of descent to the wife of Sir Henry Fitz Hugh. The Fitz Hugh family held the manor until 1513 when the direct line ended and it passed to another branch family, the Parr's. The Parr's held the manor until the death of William Parr, Marquess of Northampton in 1571. William was also the brother of Catherine Parr, Queen consort to Henry VIII. The manor was passed back to the Crown at that time before being granted in 1572 to William Cecil, Lord Burghley. The manor was inherited by his son Thomas, Earl of Exeter and thence his son William. Having no surviving son, the manor of Tanfield passed to his second daughter whose second marriage was to Robert Bruce, 2nd Earl of Elgin and 1st Earl of Ailesbury and who held the manor in 1676 and was passed down the line of descent until 1738. It became the possession of Thomas Bruce Brudenell, who succeeded to the title as well. It remained with the family until 1886.

The village has a monument called the Marmion Tower, a 15th-century gatehouse which belonged to the now vanished manor house and former home of the Marmion family known as the "Hermitage". At first floor level there is an example of an oriel window. The tower is now in the care of English Heritage and is a Grade I listed building.

The village had a railway station on the Masham branch line of the North Eastern Railway until the line was closed in 1963.

Not far from the village are the Thornborough Henges, known as the 'Stone Henge of the North'.

== Governance ==
West Tanfield was historically a parish in the North Riding of Yorkshire. In 1974 it was transferred to the new county of North Yorkshire, and from then until 2023 it was part of the Hambleton District. It is now administered by the unitary North Yorkshire Council. Until 2023, West Tanfield was part of the Richmond (Yorks) parliamentary constituency. It was removed and added to the expanded Thirsk and Malton Constituency, in part due to areas from that constituency being included in the new seat of Wetherby and Easingwold.

The parish shares a grouped parish council, Tanfield Parish Council, with the much smaller parish of East Tanfield.

An electoral ward in the name of Tanfield exists. This ward stretches east to Pickhill with a total population taken at the 2011 Census of 1,865.

== Geography ==
The village lies on the A6108 Ripon to Leyburn road and on the north bank of a large meander on the River Ure. The settlements of Nosterfield, Thornborough, Binsoe, Mickley and North Stainley all lie within 1.5 miles (2.4 km) of the village.

=== Demography ===
The 2001 UK Census recorded the population of the Parish as 532 of which 48.5% were male and 51.5% female. There were 242 dwellings in the Parish of which 92 were detached. The parish population had increased to 636 by the time of the census 2011.

== Amenities ==
Village services include two public houses and a village store encompassing the post office. The public houses, The Bull Inn and The Bruce Arms, are both Grade II Listed buildings. The Memorial Hall serves as a venue for events in the village and was built as a monument to the men of West Tanfield who died during the two world wars. West Tanfield has two holiday parks, Cedar Retreats to the east of the village and Riverdale Rural Holidays to the south.

=== Education ===
St Nicholas CE School is located in the village and is within the catchment area of Bedale High School for secondary education. The present structure in Marmion Court was built in 1965.

=== Sport ===
There is a village football team. The village Cricket Club which was founded in 1907 is situated at Sleningford on the opposite side of the Ure, they play league matches in the Nidderdale and District League and Wensleydale Evening League as well as local knockout cup competitions. There is an annual one-day Cricket Twenty20 knockout competition between West Tanfield, Kirkby Malzeard and two other local teams.

== Religion ==
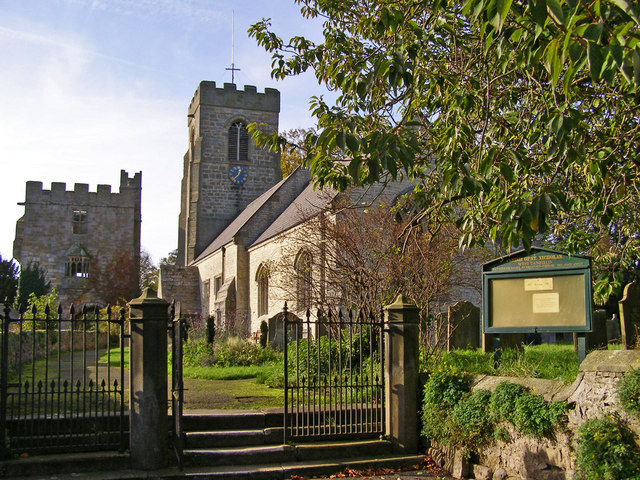
St Nicholas Church, West Tanfield

The church in the village is dedicated to St. Nicholas and is situated on Main Street. It is a Grade II Listed building erected in the 13th century and has undergone renovation in the 15th century and in 1860. John Marmion, 4th Baron Marmion of Winteringham is buried in this church. There also is a Methodist Chapel, built in 1798, located next to the old railway station and buildings on Mowbray Terrace and is a Grade II Listed building.

== See also ==
- Listed buildings in West Tanfield
