= Charlotte Mary Yonge bibliography =

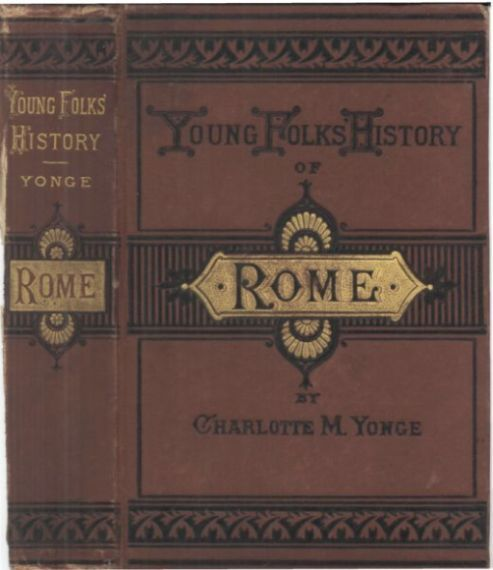
Young Folks' History of Rome book cover

This list classifies all of the works of Charlotte Mary Yonge, a prolific British novelist.

Information is taken from the Oxford Dictionary of National Biography and the British Library catalogue.

== Novels ==
- —. Château de Melville, 1838 (privately distributed)
- —. Abbeychurch, or, Self Control and Self Conceit. London: James Burns, 1844.
- —. Scenes and Characters, or, Eighteen Months at Beechcroft. London: James Burns, 1847.
- —. The Railroad Children, 1849.
- —. Henrietta's Wish, or, Domineering: A Tale 1850.
- —. Kenneth, or, The Rear Guard of the Grand Army, 1850.
- —. Langley School, 1850.
- —. The Heir of Redclyffe. 2 vols. London: John W. Parker & Son, 1853.
- —. The Herb of the Field, 1853.
- —. The Castle Builders, or, The Deferred Confirmation. London: J. & C. Mozley, 1854.
- —. Heartsease, or, The Brother's Wife, 1854.
- —. The Little Duke, or, Richard the Fearless, 1854.
- —. The Lances of Lynwood, 1855.
- —. The History of Sir Thomas Thumb, Edinburgh: Thomas Constable & Co., 1855.
- —. The Daisy Chain, or, Aspirations. London: John W. Parker & Son, 1856.
- —. Ben Sylvester's Word, 1856.
- —. Dynevor Terrace. 2 vols. London: John W. Parker and Son, 1857.
- —. Friarswood Post Office, 1860.
- —. Hopes and Fears, or, Scenes from the life of a Spinster, 1860.
- —. The Pigeon Pie, 1860.
- —. The Young Stepmother. London: Macmillan, 1861.
- —. Countess Kate. London: J. & C. Mozley, 1862.
- —. The Trial, or, More Links of the Daisy Chain, 1864.
- —. The Clever Woman of the Family. 2 vols. London and Cambridge: Macmillan, 1865.
- —. The Dove in the Eagle's Nest, 1866.
- —. The Prince and the Page; A Story of the Last Crusade, 1866.
- —. The Six Cushions, 1867.
- —. The Chaplet of Pearls, or, The White and Black Ribaumont. London: Macmillan, 1868.
- —. The Caged Lion. London: Macmillan, 1870.
- —. Little Lucy's Wonderful Globe, 1871.
- —. Dames of High Estate, 1872.
- —. The Pillars of the House, 1874.
- —. Lady Hester, or, Ursula's Narrative, 1874.
- —. The Three Brides, 1876.
- —. Magnum Bonum, 1879.
- —. Cheap Jack. London: Walter Smith, 1881.
- —. Stray Pearls: Memoirs of Margaret de Ribaumont, Viscountess of Bellaise. 2 vols. London: Walter Smith, 1881-3.
- —. The Armourer's Prentices. 2 vols. London: Macmillan, 1884.
- —. The Two Sides of the Shield. 2 vols. London: Macmillan, 1885.
- —. Chantry House. 2 vols. London: Macmillan, 1886.
- —. A Modern Telemachus. 2 vols. London: Macmillan, 1886.
- —. Beechcroft at Rockstone. 2 vols. London: Macmillan, 1888.
- —. Our New Mistress, or Changes at Brookfield Earl. London: National Society's Depository, 1888.
- —. A Reputed Changeling, or, Three Seventh Years Two Centuries Ago. 2 vols. London: Macmillan, 1889.
- —. The Cunning Woman's Grandson; a Tale of Cheddar a hundred years ago. London: National Society's Depository, 1890.
- —. The Slaves of Sabinus, Jew and Gentile. London: National Society's Depository, 1890.
- —. That Stick. London: Macmillan, 1891.
- —. An Old Woman's Outlook. London: Macmillan, 1892.
- —. The Cook and the Captive, or Attalus the Hostage. London: National Society's Depository, 1895.
- —. The Carbonels. London: National Society's Depository, 1896.
- —. The Patriots of Palestine, a Story of the Maccabees. London: National Society's Depository, 1899.
- —. Modern Broods, or, Developments Unlooked For. London: Macmillan, 1900.

== Plays ==
- —. The Apple of Discord. London: Groombridge and Sons, 1864.

== Anthologies ==
- —. Aunt Charlotte's Evenings at Home With the Poets. A collection of poems for the Young, with conversations, arranged in twenty five evenings, etc. London: Marcus Ward, 1880.

== Story collections ==
- —. The Christmas Mummers and other stories. London: J. & C. Mozley, 1858. Contains The Christmas Mummers, The Rail-Road Children, Leonard, the Lion-Hearted, Ben Sylvester's Word, Midsummer Day; or, The Two Churches, Harriet and Her Sister, and London Pride.
- —. A Book of Golden Deeds of All Times and All Lands. London: Macmillan, 1864.
- —. A Book of Worthies gathered from the old histories and now written anew by the author of The Heir of Redclyffe. London: Macmillan, 1869.
- —. Aunt Charlotte's Stories of Bible History for the little ones. London: n.p., 1873.
- —. Aunt Charlotte's Stories of English History for the Little ones. London, Marcus Ward, 1873.
- —. Aunt Charlotte's Stories of Greek History for the little ones. London: n.p., 1876.
- —. Aunt Charlotte's Stories of Roman History for the little ones. London: n.p., 1877.
- —. Aunt Charlotte's Stories of German History for the little ones. London: Marcus Ward, 1878.
- —. Bye-Words. A Collection of tales new and old. London: Macmillan, 1880.
- —. Aunt Charlotte's Stories of American History. London: Marcus Ward, 1883.
- —. Aunt Charlotte's Stories of French History for the little ones. London: Marcus Ward, 1893.

== Biographies ==
- —. Hannah More.
- —. Life of John Coleridge Patteson

== Co-authored works ==
- —, Mary Bramston, Christabel Rose Coleridge, and Esmé Stuart. Astray: A Tale of a Country Town. London: Hatchards, 1886.

== Works edited ==
- —, ed. Biographies of Good Women, chiefly by contributors to The Monthly Packet. Edited by the author of The Heir of Redclyffe. 2nd series. London: J. & C. Mozley, 1862.
- —, ed. A Storehouse of Stories.London: Macmillan, 1870.
- —, ed. Charity. Scripture texts and sacred songs. London: Griffith & Farran, 1884.
- Du Boys, Albert. Catherine of Aragon and the Sources of the English Reformation. Edited from the French, with notes, by C. M. Yonge. 2 vols. London: Hurst & Blackett, 1881.
- Wilford, Florence. Beneath the Cross: readings for children on Our Lord's Seven sayings. Ed. by Charlotte M. Yonge. With a preface by ... R. F. Wilson. London: Masters and Co., 1881.
- John Keble's Parishes – A History of Hursley and Otterbourne. (1898)

== Other works ==
- —. The Story of the Christians and Moors of Spain, London: MacMillan, 1878.
- —. Cameos from English History. 7 vols. London: Macmillan, 1880-1890.
- —. Burnt out: a story for mothers' meetings. London: n.p., 1882.
- —. A Story of Mission Work in China. 1900.
- —. History of Christian Names 1863 (per her original Preface); Macmillan and Co., London, 1884; republished by Gale Research Co., Book Tower, Detroit, 1966.
- —. Young Folks' History of Rome. Boston: Estes & Lauriat, 1880.
