= Thornby =

Thornby may refer to:

- Thornby, Cumbria
- Thornby, Northamptonshire
