= Thornborough, North Yorkshire =

Village in North Yorkshire, England

Coordinates: 54.21489°N 1.5472°W

Thornborough
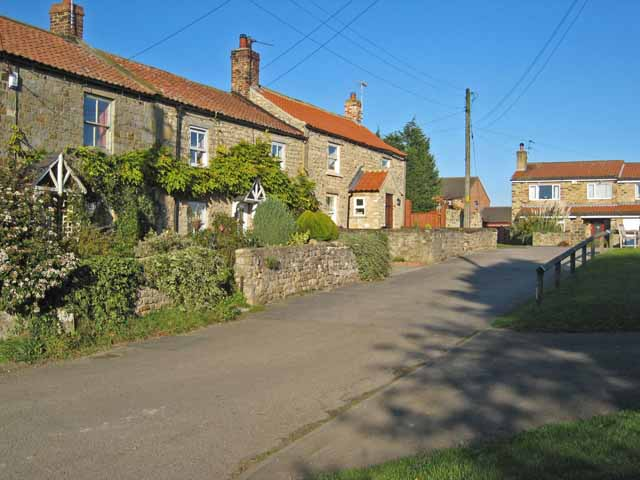
- Cottages in Thornborough

- Location within North Yorkshire
- OS grid reference: SE296799
- Civil parish: West Tanfield
- Unitary authority: North Yorkshire
- Ceremonial county: North Yorkshire
- Region: Yorkshire and the Humber
- Country: England
- Sovereign state: United Kingdom
- Post town: Bedale
- Postcode district: DL8
- Police: North Yorkshire
- Fire: North Yorkshire
- Ambulance: Yorkshire
- UK Parliament: Thirsk and Malton

Thornborough is a village in the county of North Yorkshire, England. It is about 7 miles (11 km) south of Bedale and 3 miles (5 km) west of the A1(M) motorway. Thornborough is in the West Tanfield parish. The Thornborough Henges ancient monuments are situated south and west of the village. The village lies just to the south of the B6267 road, which connects the A6055 in the east, with the A6108 road at Masham. The village is served by two buses a day in each direction between Ripon and Masham. When the Masham Branch of the North Eastern Railway was open, Tanfield station would have been the nearest railway station to Thornborough. Now the nearest railway station is at Thirsk.

The village is not mentioned in the Domesday Book, and the first recorded use of Thornborough was in 1198 as Thornbergh, meaning Thorn Hill. The second part of the name Beorg, derives from Old Norse and is found in other place names such as Barby, Barrowby and Borrowby. It is thought that this led to the Old English Beorg, which means Barrow. The village was previously in the Wapentakes of Hang East and Hallikeld. Today, as part of the parish of West Tanfield, its population is recorded with that parish returns for the 2011 census.

From 1974 to 2023 it was part of the Hambleton District, it is now administered by the unitary North Yorkshire Council.

A small cidermaking venture (Thornborough Cider) is based in the village which uses apples only from Yorkshire. The cider has been in production since 2010, and in 2016, the company planted their own 5-acre (2 ha) orchard in the village. Thornborough Cider have won many awards for the quality of their product.
