= HMS Thornborough =

Frigate of the Royal Navy

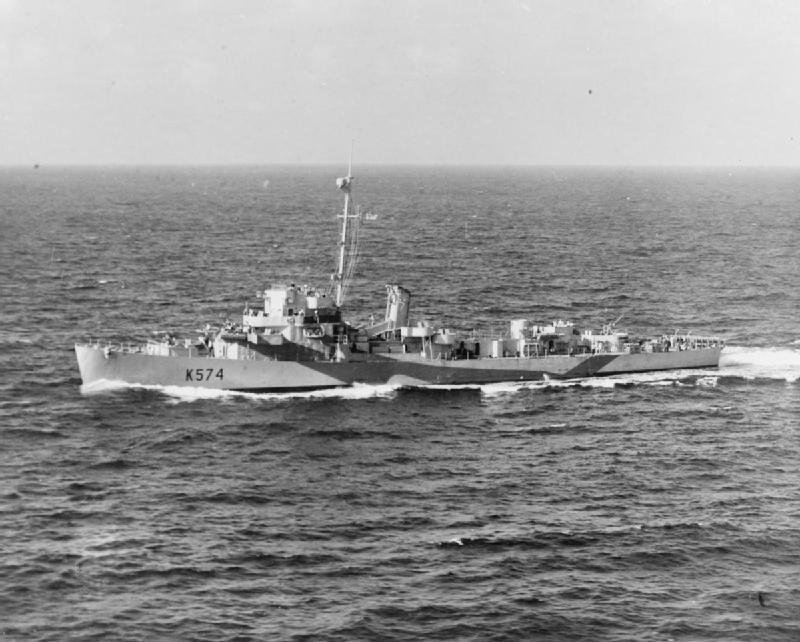
- HMS Thornborough photographed during World War II by an aircraft operating from Royal Naval Air Station HMS Osprey, Dunoon, Scotland.

History

United States
- Name: unnamed (DE-565)
- Builder: Bethlehem-Hingham Shipyard, Hingham, Massachusetts
- Laid down: 22 September 1943
- Launched: 13 November 1943
- Completed: 31 December 1943
- Fate: Transferred to United Kingdom 31 December 1943
- Acquired: Returned by United Kingdom 29 January 1947
- Fate: Sold for scrapping 24 April 1947

United Kingdom
- Name: HMS Thornborough (K574)
- Namesake: Admiral Sir Edward Thornbrough (1754-1834), British naval officer who was commanding officer of HMS Robust at the invasion of Quiberon Bay in 1795
- Acquired: 31 December 1943
- Commissioned: 31 December 1943
- Decommissioned: 1945
- Fate: Returned to United States 29 January 1947

General characteristics
- Displacement: 1,400 long tons (1,422 t)
- Length: 306 ft (93 m)
- Beam: 36.75 ft (11.2 m)
- Draught: 9 ft (2.7 m)
- Propulsion: Two Foster-Wheeler Express "D"-type water-tube boilers; GE 13,500 shp (10,070 kW) steam turbines and generators (9,200 kW); Electric motors for 12,000 shp (8,900 kW); Two shafts
- Speed: 24 knots (44 km/h)
- Range: 5,500 nautical miles (10,200 km) at 15 knots (28 km/h)
- Complement: 186
- Sensors & processing systems: SA & SL type radars; Type 144 series Asdic; MF Direction Finding antenna; HF Direction Finding Type FH 4 antenna
- Armament: 3 × 3 in (76 mm) /50 Mk.22 guns; 1 × twin Bofors 40 mm mount Mk.I; 7–16 × 20 mm Oerlikon guns; Mark 10 Hedgehog antisubmarine mortar; Depth charges; QF 2-pounder naval gun

HMS Thornborough (K574), sometimes spelled Thornbrough, was a British Captain-class frigate of the Royal Navy in commission during World War II. Originally constructed as a United States Navy Buckley class destroyer escort, the ship served in the Royal Navy from 1943 to 1945.

== Construction and transfer ==
The ship was laid down as the unnamed U.S. Navy destroyer escort DE-565 by Bethlehem-Hingham Shipyard, Inc., in Hingham, Massachusetts, on 22 September 1943 and launched on 13 November 1943. She was transferred to the United Kingdom upon completion on 31 December 1943.

== Service history ==
Commissioned into service in the Royal Navy as the frigate HMS Thornborough (K574) on 31 December 1943 simultaneously with her transfer, the ship served on patrol and escort duty for the remainder of World War II.

The Royal Navy decommissioned Thornborough in 1945 and returned her to the U.S. Navy on 27 January 1947.

== Disposal ==
The United States sold Thornborough on 24 April 1947 to a shipbuilding firm in Greece for scrapping.
