= Nosterfield =

Hamlet in North Yorkshire, England

Coordinates: 54.21945°N 1.57583°W

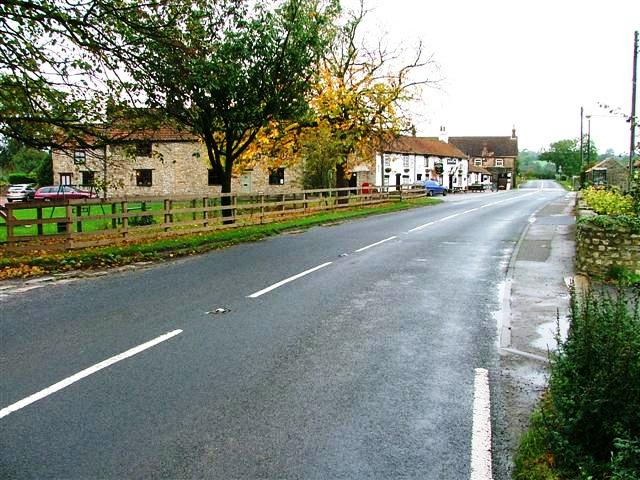
- Nosterfield

- Location within North Yorkshire
- OS grid reference: SE277804
- Civil parish: West Tanfield
- Unitary authority: North Yorkshire
- Ceremonial county: North Yorkshire
- Region: Yorkshire and the Humber
- Country: England
- Sovereign state: United Kingdom
- Post town: BEDALE
- Postcode district: DL8
- Police: North Yorkshire
- Fire: North Yorkshire
- Ambulance: Yorkshire

Nosterfield is a hamlet within the civil parish of West Tanfield in the county of North Yorkshire, England formerly used for quarrying.

From 1974 to 2023 it was part of the district of Richmondshire, it is now administered by the unitary North Yorkshire Council.

Several of the buildings in the village including The Freemasons' Arms are designated as Grade II listed buildings.

Nosterfield Local Nature Reserve is run as part of the Lower Ure Conservation Trust and is one of the most important wetland sites in Yorkshire recognised via designation as a Site of Importance for Nature Conservation (SINC) by North Yorkshire County Council.
