= Thornbrough =

Civil parish in North Yorkshire, England

Coordinates: 54.259°N 1.338°W

- Civil parish
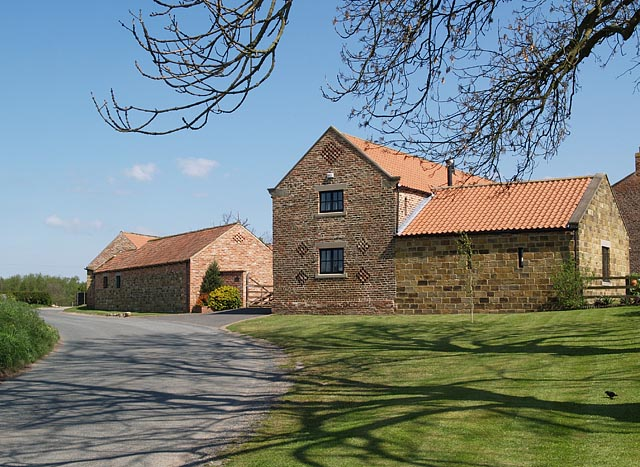
- Farm at Thornbrough

- Location within North Yorkshire
- Population: 20 (2014)
- OS grid reference: SE431850
- Civil parish: Thornbrough
- Unitary authority: North Yorkshire
- Ceremonial county: North Yorkshire
- Region: Yorkshire and the Humber
- Country: England
- Sovereign state: United Kingdom
- Post town: THIRSK
- Postcode district: YO7
- Police: North Yorkshire
- Fire: North Yorkshire
- Ambulance: Yorkshire

Thornbrough is a civil parish in the county of North Yorkshire, England. The population of the civil parish was estimated at 20 in 2014.

From 1974 to 2023 it was part of the Hambleton District, it is now administered by the unitary North Yorkshire Council.
