= List of Sites of Special Scientific Interest in Anglesey =

Map of Isle of Anglesey within Wales

This is a list of the Sites of Special Scientific Interest (SSSIs) in the Isle of Anglesey Area of Search (AoS).

== Sites ==
- Arfordir Gogleddol Penmon
- Baron Hill Park
- Beddmanarch–Cymyran
- Bwrdd Arthur
- Cadnant Dingle
- Cae Gwyn
- Caeau Talwrn
- Carmel Head
- Cemlyn Bay
- Clegir Mawr
- Coed y Gell and Morfa Dulas
- Cors Bodeilio
- Cors Bodwrog
- Cors Erddreiniog
- Cors Goch
- Cors y Farl
- Craig Wen / Cors Castell
- Fferam Uchaf
- Glannau Penmon - Biwmares
- Glannau Porthaethwy
- Glannau Rhoscolyn
- Glannau Ynys Gybi - Holy Island Coast
- Glan-traeth
- Gwenfro and Rhos y Gad
- Henborth
- Llanbadrig - Dinas Gynfor
- Llyn Alaw
- Llyn Bodgylched
- Llyn Garreg-lwyd
- Llyn Hafodol and Cors Clegyrog
- Llyn Llygeirian
- Llyn Llywenan
- Llyn Maelog
- Llyn Padrig
- Llyn Traffwll
- Llynnau y Fali - Valley Lakes Valley Wetlands
- Malltraeth Marsh - Cors Ddyga
- Mariandyrys
- Mynydd Parys
- Nantanog
- Newborough Warren - Ynys Llanddwyn Newborough Warren
- Penrhoslligwy
- Penrhynoedd Llangadwaladr
- Porth Diana
- Puffin Island - Ynys Seiriol
- Rhoscolyn Reedbeds
- Rhosneigr
- Rhosneigr Reefs
- Rhosydd Llanddona
- Salbri
- Sgistau Glas Ynys Môn
- The Skerries
- Traeth Lligwy
- Tre r Gof
- Tre Wilmot
- Trwyn Dwlban
- Ty Croes
- Tyddyn y Waen
- Tywyn Aberffraw
- Waun Eurad
- Y Werthyr
- Ynys Feurig
