= List of United Kingdom locations: Fa-Fe =

The United Kingdom

This is part of the list of United Kingdom locations: a gazetteer of place names in the United Kingdom showing each place's locality and geographical coordinates.

== Fa ==
=== Fab-Fan ===
Location	Locality	Coordinates (links to map & photo sources)	OS grid reference
Faberstown	Wiltshire	51.24°N 01.61°W	SU2750
Faccombe	Hampshire	51.32°N 01.45°W	SU3858
Faceby	North Yorkshire	54.42°N 01.24°W	NZ4903
Fachell	Gwynedd	53.17°N 04.18°W	SH5466
Fachwen	Gwynedd	53.12°N 04.13°W	SH5761
Facit	Lancashire	53.66°N 02.18°W	SD8819
Fackley	Nottinghamshire	53.14°N 01.29°W	SK4761
Faddiley	Cheshire	53.07°N 02.61°W	SJ5953
Fadmoor	North Yorkshire	54.29°N 00.97°W	SE6789
Faerdre	Swansea	51.69°N 03.89°W	SN6901
Fagley	Bradford	53.80°N 01.72°W	SE1834
Fagwyr	Swansea	51.70°N 03.92°W	SN6702
Faichem	Highland	57.06°N 04.83°W	NH2801
Faifley	West Dunbartonshire	55.91°N 04.40°W	NS5072
Failand	North Somerset	51.43°N 02.69°W	ST5271
Failford	South Ayrshire	55.50°N 04.44°W	NS4626
Failsworth	Oldham	53.50°N 02.16°W	SD8901
Fairbourne	Gwynedd	52.69°N 04.05°W	SH6113
Fairbourne Heath	Kent	51.21°N 00.64°E	TQ8550
Fairburn	North Yorkshire	53.73°N 01.28°W	SE4727
Fair Cross	Barking and Dagenham	51.54°N 00.08°E	TQ4585
Fairfield	Kent	51.00°N 00.79°E	TQ9626
Fairfield	Worcestershire	52.37°N 02.08°W	SO9475
Fairfield	Evesham, Worcestershire	52.07°N 01.95°W	SP0342
Fairfield	Stockton-on-Tees	54.56°N 01.36°W	NZ4119
Fairfield	Manchester	53.47°N 02.15°W	SJ9097
Fairfield	Bury	53.59°N 02.27°W	SD8211
Fairfield	Liverpool	53.41°N 02.94°W	SJ3791
Fairfield	Derbyshire	53.25°N 01.89°W	SK0773
Fairfield	Clackmannan	56.12°N 03.78°W	NS8994
Fairfield Park	Bath and North East Somerset	51.39°N 02.36°W	ST7566
Fairfields	Milton Keynes	52.04°N 0.84°W	SO7432
Fairfields	Gloucestershire	51.98°N 02.38°W	SP798390
Fairford	Gloucestershire	51.69°N 01.78°W	SP1500
Fair Green	Norfolk	52.71°N 00.44°E	TF6516
Fair Hill	Cumbria	54.67°N 02.77°W	NY5031
Fairhill	South Lanarkshire	55.75°N 04.05°W	NS7153
Fair Isle	Shetland Islands	59.53°N 01.63°W	HZ210721
Fairlands	Surrey	51.25°N 00.62°W	SU9652
Fairlee	Isle of Wight	50.70°N 01.29°W	SZ5090
Fairlie	North Ayrshire	55.75°N 04.87°W	NS2055
Fairlight	East Sussex	50.87°N 00.64°E	TQ8612
Fairlight Cove	East Sussex	50.86°N 00.65°E	TQ8711
Fairlop	Redbridge	51.59°N 00.09°E	TQ4590
Fairmile	Dorset	50.74°N 01.78°W	SZ1594
Fairmile	Devon	50.76°N 03.30°W	SY0897
Fairmile	Surrey	51.33°N 00.39°W	TQ1261
Fairmilehead	City of Edinburgh	55.89°N 03.20°W	NT2568
Fair Moor	Northumberland	55.17°N 01.71°W	NZ1887
Fairoak	Caerphilly	51.68°N 03.20°W	ST1799
Fair Oak (near Eastleigh)	Hampshire	50.95°N 01.30°W	SU4918
Fair Oak (Ashford Hill)	Hampshire	51.34°N 01.21°W	SU5561
Fair Oak	Lancashire	53.90°N 02.54°W	SD6446
Fairoak	Staffordshire	52.88°N 02.35°W	SJ7632
Fair Oak Green	Hampshire	51.33°N 01.03°W	SU6760
Fairseat	Kent	51.32°N 00.32°E	TQ6261
Fairstead	Essex	51.81°N 00.55°E	TL7616
Fairstead	Norfolk	52.74°N 00.42°E	TF6419
Fairview	Gloucestershire	51.89°N 02.07°W	SO9522
Fairwarp	East Sussex	51.01°N 00.08°E	TQ4626
Fairwater	Torfaen	51.64°N 03.05°W	ST2794
Fairwater	Cardiff	51.48°N 03.25°W	ST1377
Fairwood	Wiltshire	51.25°N 02.23°W	ST8451
Fairy Cross	Devon	50.99°N 04.28°W	SS4024
Fakenham	Norfolk	52.83°N 00.84°E	TF9230
Fakenham Magna	Suffolk	52.34°N 00.78°E	TL9076
Fala	Midlothian	55.83°N 02.91°W	NT4361
Falahill	Scottish Borders	55.79°N 02.97°W	NT3956
Falcon	Herefordshire	51.98°N 02.58°W	SO6032
Falcon Lodge	Birmingham	52.56°N 01.79°W	SP1496
Falconwood	Greenwich	51.45°N 00.08°E	TQ4575
Falcutt	Northamptonshire	52.07°N 01.14°W	SP5942
Faldingworth	Lincolnshire	53.34°N 00.40°W	TF0684
Faldonside	Scottish Borders	55.57°N 02.79°W	NT5032
Falfield	South Gloucestershire	51.63°N 02.46°W	ST6893
Falkenham	Suffolk	52.00°N 01.33°E	TM2939
Falkenham Sink	Suffolk	52.00°N 01.33°E	TM2939
Falkirk	Falkirk	56.00°N 03.79°W	NS8880
Falkland	Fife	56.25°N 03.21°W	NO2507
Fallgate	Derbyshire	53.15°N 01.47°W	SK3562
Fallin	Stirling	56.09°N 03.88°W	NS8391
Fallinge	Derbyshire	53.19°N 01.61°W	SK2666
Fallings Heath	Walsall	52.56°N 02.03°W	SO9896
Fallowfield	Manchester	53.43°N 02.22°W	SJ8593
Fallside	South Lanarkshire	55.81°N 04.06°W	NS7160
Falmer	Brighton and Hove	50.85°N 00.08°W	TQ3508
Falmouth	Cornwall	50.14°N 05.08°W	SW8032
Falnash	Scottish Borders	55.33°N 02.96°W	NT3905
Falsgrave	North Yorkshire	54.26°N 00.43°W	TA0287
Falside	West Lothian	55.89°N 03.66°W	NS9668
Falstone	Northumberland	55.17°N 02.44°W	NY7287
Fanagmore	Highland	58.39°N 05.13°W	NC1749
Fancott	Bedfordshire	51.93°N 00.53°W	TL0127
Fanellan	Highland	57.44°N 04.53°W	NH4842
Fangdale Beck	North Yorkshire	54.33°N 01.14°W	SE5694
Fangfoss	East Riding of Yorkshire	53.96°N 00.84°W	SE7653
Fankerton	Falkirk	56.01°N 03.94°W	NS7982
Fanmore	Argyll and Bute	56.51°N 06.21°W	NM4144
Fanner's Green	Essex	51.78°N 00.41°E	TL6712
Fans	Scottish Borders	55.65°N 02.62°W	NT6140
Fanshawe	Cheshire	53.23°N 02.22°W	SJ8571
Fant	Kent	51.26°N 00.49°E	TQ7455

=== Far ===
Location	Locality	Coordinates (links to map & photo sources)	OS grid reference
Fara	Orkney Islands	58.84°N 03.17°W	ND323958
Faraid Head	Highland	58.59°N 04.77°W	NC386711
Far Arnside	Cumbria	54.17°N 02.85°W	SD4476
Faray	Orkney Islands	59.21°N 02.82°W	HY528368
Far Bank	Doncaster	53.61°N 01.03°W	SE6413
Far Banks	Lancashire	53.68°N 02.90°W	SD4021
Farcet	Cambridgeshire	52.53°N 00.23°W	TL2094
Far Coton	Leicestershire	52.61°N 01.44°W	SK3802
Far Cotton	Northamptonshire	52.21°N 00.90°W	SP7558
Farden	Shropshire	52.37°N 02.63°W	SO5775
Fareham	Hampshire	50.85°N 01.20°W	SU5606
Far End	Cumbria	54.37°N 03.07°W	SD3098
Farewell	Staffordshire	52.69°N 01.88°W	SK0811
Far Forest	Worcestershire	52.37°N 02.41°W	SO7275
Farforth	Lincolnshire	53.28°N 00.03°W	TF3178
Far Green	Gloucestershire	51.69°N 02.33°W	SO7700
Farhill	Derbyshire	53.16°N 01.47°W	SK3563
Far Hoarcross	Staffordshire	52.79°N 01.80°W	SK1322
Faringdon	Oxfordshire	51.65°N 01.59°W	SU2895
Farington (area of Leyland)	Lancashire	53.71°N 02.71°W	SD5324
Farington (near Leyland)	Lancashire	53.70°N 02.69°W	SD5423
Farington Moss	Lancashire	53.71°N 02.72°W	SD5224
Farlam	Cumbria	54.91°N 02.70°W	NY5558
Farland Head	North Ayrshire	55.69°N 04.89°W	NS182485
Farlands Booth	Derbyshire	53.38°N 01.92°W	SK0587
Far Laund	Derbyshire	53.02°N 01.46°W	SK3648
Farleigh	North Somerset	51.41°N 02.73°W	ST4969
Farleigh	Surrey	51.32°N 00.03°W	TQ3760
Farleigh Court	Surrey	51.32°N 00.03°W	TQ3760
Farleigh Green	Kent	51.24°N 00.46°E	TQ7252
Farleigh Hungerford	Somerset	51.31°N 02.28°W	ST8057
Farleigh Wallop	Hampshire	51.21°N 01.11°W	SU6246
Farleigh Wick	Wiltshire	51.37°N 02.28°W	ST8064
Farlesthorpe	Lincolnshire	53.24°N 00.20°E	TF4774
Farleton	Cumbria	54.22°N 02.72°W	SD5381
Farleton	Lancashire	54.09°N 02.65°W	SD5767
Farley	Wiltshire	51.06°N 01.68°W	SU2229
Far Ley	Shropshire	52.58°N 02.31°W	SO7999
Farley	North Somerset	51.46°N 02.83°W	ST4274
Farley	Derbyshire	53.14°N 01.56°W	SK2961
Farley	Staffordshire	52.99°N 01.91°W	SK0644
Farley (Much Wenlock)	Shropshire	52.61°N 02.54°W	SJ6302
Farley (Pontesbury)	Shropshire	52.65°N 02.91°W	SJ3807
Farley Green	Surrey	51.19°N 00.48°W	TQ0645
Farley Green	Suffolk	52.14°N 00.52°E	TL7353
Farley Hill	Bedfordshire	51.86°N 00.44°W	TL0720
Farley Hill	Berkshire	51.37°N 00.92°W	SU7564
Farleys End	Gloucestershire	51.83°N 02.33°W	SO7715
Farlington	City of Portsmouth	50.84°N 01.03°W	SU6805
Farlington	North Yorkshire	54.09°N 01.06°W	SE6167
Farlow	Shropshire	52.41°N 02.54°W	SO6380
Farmborough	Bath and North East Somerset	51.33°N 02.48°W	ST6660
Farmbridge End	Essex	51.77°N 00.34°E	TL6211
Farmcote	Shropshire	52.51°N 02.32°W	SO7891
Farmcote	Gloucestershire	51.95°N 01.91°W	SP0628
Farmington	Gloucestershire	51.83°N 01.81°W	SP1315
Farmoor	Oxfordshire	51.75°N 01.34°W	SP4506
Far Moor	Wigan	53.53°N 02.71°W	SD5304
Farms Common	Cornwall	50.16°N 05.26°W	SW6734
Farmtown	Moray	57.54°N 02.83°W	NJ5051
Farm Town	Leicestershire	52.74°N 01.42°W	SK3916
Farnah Green	Derbyshire	53.01°N 01.50°W	SK3347
Farnborough	Berkshire	51.52°N 01.38°W	SU4381
Farnborough	Bromley	51.35°N 00.06°E	TQ4464
Farnborough	Hampshire	51.27°N 00.75°W	SU8754
Farnborough	Warwickshire	52.14°N 01.37°W	SP4349
Farnborough Green	Hampshire	51.30°N 00.75°W	SU8757
Farnborough Park	Hampshire	51.28°N 00.75°W	SU8755
Farnborough Park	Bromley	51.371°N 00.056°E	TQ432656
Farnborough Street	Hampshire	51.29°N 00.75°W	SU8756
Farncombe	Surrey	51.19°N 00.61°W	SU9745
Farndish	Bedfordshire	52.25°N 00.65°W	SP9263
Farndon	Nottinghamshire	53.06°N 00.85°W	SK7752
Farndon	Wrexham	53.08°N 02.88°W	SJ4154
Farnell	Angus	56.68°N 02.62°W	NO6255
Farnham	Surrey	51.20°N 00.79°W	SU8446
Farnham	Dorset	50.93°N 02.07°W	ST9515
Farnham	Suffolk	52.18°N 01.45°E	TM3660
Farnham	Essex	51.89°N 00.13°E	TL4724
Farnham	North Yorkshire	54.03°N 01.48°W	SE3460
Farnham Common	Buckinghamshire	51.55°N 00.61°W	SU9685
Farnham Green	Hertfordshire	51.90°N 00.12°E	TL4625
Farnham Park	Buckinghamshire	51.53°N 00.61°W	SU9683
Farnham Royal	Buckinghamshire	51.53°N 00.61°W	SU9683
Farnhill	North Yorkshire	53.91°N 02.00°W	SE0046
Farningham	Kent	51.37°N 00.21°E	TQ5466
Farnley	Leeds	53.78°N 01.62°W	SE2532
Farnley	North Yorkshire	53.91°N 01.68°W	SE2147
Farnley Bank	Kirklees	53.61°N 01.75°W	SE1613
Farnley Tyas	Kirklees	53.60°N 01.75°W	SE1612
Farnsfield	Nottinghamshire	53.09°N 01.04°W	SK6456
Farnworth	Bolton	53.54°N 02.40°W	SD7305
Farnworth	Cheshire	53.37°N 02.73°W	SJ5187
Far Oakridge	Gloucestershire	51.72°N 02.11°W	SO9203
Farr	Highland	58.53°N 04.20°W	NC7263
Farraline	Highland	57.25°N 04.38°W	NH5621
Farringdon	Devon	50.71°N 03.40°W	SY0191
Farringdon	Sunderland	54.87°N 01.44°W	NZ3653
Farrington	Dorset	50.93°N 02.22°W	ST8415
Farrington Gurney	Bath and North East Somerset	51.29°N 02.53°W	ST6355
Far Royds	Leeds	53.77°N 01.60°W	SE2631
Far Sawrey	Cumbria	54.34°N 02.97°W	SD3795
Farsley	Leeds	53.81°N 01.68°W	SE2135
Farsley Beck Bottom	Leeds	53.81°N 01.66°W	SE2235
Farther Howegreen	Essex	51.67°N 00.66°E	TL8401
Farthing Corner	Kent	51.33°N 00.59°E	TQ8163
Farthing Green	Kent	51.18°N 00.58°E	TQ8146
Farthinghoe	Northamptonshire	52.04°N 01.22°W	SP5339
Farthingloe	Kent	51.11°N 01.27°E	TR2940
Farthingstone	Northamptonshire	52.18°N 01.10°W	SP6154
Farthing Street	Bromley	51.345°N 00.052°E	TQ430626
Far Thrupp	Gloucestershire	51.72°N 02.20°W	SO8603
Fartown	Kirklees	53.65°N 01.78°W	SE1418
Farway	Devon	50.74°N 03.16°W	SY1895
Farway Marsh	Devon	50.83°N 02.99°W	ST3004
Farwig	Bromley	51.411°N 00.015°E	TQ402699

=== Fas-Faz ===
Location	Locality	Coordinates (links to map & photo sources)	OS grid reference
Fasach	Highland	57.43°N 06.70°W	NG1848
Fasag	Highland	57.54°N 05.52°W	NG8956
Faskally	Perth and Kinross	56.71°N 03.78°W	NN9160
Faslane Port	Argyll and Bute	56.05°N 04.82°W	NS2488
Fasnacloich	Argyll and Bute	56.57°N 05.24°W	NN0147
Fassfern	Highland	56.85°N 05.24°W	NN0278
Fatfield	Sunderland	54.88°N 01.53°W	NZ3054
Faucheldean	West Lothian	55.95°N 03.47°W	NT0874
Faugh	Cumbria	54.88°N 02.78°W	NY5055
Faughill	Scottish Borders	55.56°N 02.73°W	NT5430
Fauld	Staffordshire	52.84°N 01.73°W	SK1828
Fauldhouse	West Lothian	55.82°N 03.70°W	NS9360
Fauldshope	Scottish Borders	55.51°N 02.93°W	NT4125
Faulkbourne	Essex	51.82°N 00.59°E	TL7917
Faulkland	Somerset	51.28°N 02.38°W	ST7354
Fauls	Shropshire	52.88°N 02.61°W	SJ5932
Faverdale	Darlington	54.53°N 01.58°W	NZ2716
Faversham	Kent	51.31°N 00.88°E	TR0161
Fawdington	North Yorkshire	54.14°N 01.34°W	SE4372
Fawdon	Northumberland	55.42°N 01.95°W	NU0315
Fawdon	Newcastle upon Tyne	55.00°N 01.65°W	NZ2268
Fawfieldhead	Staffordshire	53.16°N 01.89°W	SK0763
Fawkham Green	Kent	51.36°N 00.26°E	TQ5865
Fawler (West Oxfordshire)	Oxfordshire	51.85°N 01.46°W	SP3717
Fawler (Vale of White Horse)	Oxfordshire	51.59°N 01.55°W	SU3188
Fawley	Hampshire	50.82°N 01.36°W	SU4503
Fawley	Berkshire	51.52°N 01.43°W	SU3981
Fawley	Buckinghamshire	51.56°N 00.91°W	SU7586
Fawley Bottom	Buckinghamshire	51.56°N 00.93°W	SU7486
Fawley Chapel	Herefordshire	51.95°N 02.61°W	SO5829
Faxfleet	East Riding of Yorkshire	53.70°N 00.69°W	SE8624
Faygate	West Sussex	51.09°N 00.27°W	TQ2134
Fazakerley	Liverpool	53.45°N 02.93°W	SJ3896
Fazeley	Staffordshire	52.61°N 01.70°W	SK2002

== Fe ==
=== Fea-Fel ===
Location	Locality	Coordinates (links to map & photo sources)	OS grid reference
Feagour	Highland	56.97°N 04.37°W	NN5690
Fearby	North Yorkshire	54.22°N 01.71°W	SE1981
Fearn	Highland	57.76°N 03.96°W	NH8377
Fearnan	Perth and Kinross	56.57°N 04.08°W	NN7244
Fearnbeg	Highland	57.56°N 05.79°W	NG7359
Fearnhead	Cheshire	53.40°N 02.55°W	SJ6390
Fearnmore	Highland	57.57°N 05.81°W	NG7260
Fearnville	Leeds	53.81°N 01.50°W	SE3335
Featherstone	Wakefield	53.67°N 01.36°W	SE4220
Featherstone	Staffordshire	52.64°N 02.09°W	SJ9405
Feckenham	Worcestershire	52.24°N 02.00°W	SP0061
Fedw Fawr	Isle of Anglesey	53.30°N 04.10°W	SH6081
Feering	Essex	51.83°N 00.71°E	TL8719
Feetham	North Yorkshire	54.37°N 02.03°W	SD9898
Fegg Hayes	City of Stoke-on-Trent	53.07°N 02.19°W	SJ8753
Feizor	North Yorkshire	54.09°N 02.32°W	SD7967
Felbridge	Surrey	51.13°N 00.05°W	TQ3639
Felbrigg	Norfolk	52.90°N 01.27°E	TG2039
Felcourt	Surrey	51.15°N 00.02°W	TQ3841
Felderland	Kent	51.25°N 01.32°E	TR3256
Feldy	Cheshire	53.30°N 02.46°W	SJ6979
Felhampton	Shropshire	52.47°N 02.82°W	SO4487
Felin-Crai	Powys	51.89°N 03.62°W	SN8823
Felindre (Llangeler)	Carmarthenshire	52.01°N 04.40°W	SN3538
Felindre (Llangyndeyrn)	Carmarthenshire	51.78°N 04.23°W	SN4612
Felindre (Llangathen)	Carmarthenshire	51.86°N 04.10°W	SN5521
Felindre (Llangadog)	Carmarthenshire	51.92°N 03.89°W	SN7027
Felindre (Beguildy)	Powys	52.42°N 03.23°W	SO1681
Felindre (Berriew)	Powys	52.60°N 03.24°W	SJ1601
Felindre (Llanfihangel Cwmdu)	Powys	51.89°N 03.20°W	SO1723
Felindre	Rhondda, Cynon, Taff	51.51°N 03.48°W	SS9781
Felindre	Swansea	51.70°N 03.98°W	SN6302
Felindre Farchog	Pembrokeshire	52.01°N 04.77°W	SN1039
Felinfach	Ceredigion	52.17°N 04.16°W	SN5255
Felinfach	Powys	51.98°N 03.32°W	SO0933
Felinfoel	Carmarthenshire	51.69°N 04.14°W	SN5202
Felingwmisaf	Carmarthenshire	51.88°N 04.18°W	SN5023
Felingwmuchaf	Carmarthenshire	51.89°N 04.18°W	SN5024
Felin Newydd	Carmarthenshire	52.02°N 03.95°W	SN6638
Felin-newydd	Powys	52.00°N 03.29°W	SO1135
Felin Newydd	Powys	52.85°N 03.15°W	SJ2229
Felin Puleston	Wrexham	53.03°N 03.01°W	SJ3249
Felin-Wnda	Ceredigion	52.08°N 04.45°W	SN3246
Felixkirk	North Yorkshire	54.25°N 01.29°W	SE4684
Felixstowe	Suffolk	51.95°N 01.34°E	TM3034
Felixstowe Ferry	Suffolk	51.98°N 01.37°E	TM3237
Felkington	Northumberland	55.69°N 02.09°W	NT9444
Felkirk	Wakefield	53.60°N 01.42°W	SE3812
Felldyke	Cumbria	54.55°N 03.42°W	NY0819
Fell End	Cumbria	54.37°N 02.43°W	SD7298
Fellgate	South Tyneside	54.95°N 01.50°W	NZ3262
Felling	Gateshead	54.94°N 01.58°W	NZ2761
Felling Shore	Gateshead	54.96°N 01.57°W	NZ2763
Fell Lane	Bradford	53.85°N 01.94°W	SE0440
Fell Side	Cumbria	54.72°N 03.08°W	NY3037
Fellside	Gateshead	54.93°N 01.70°W	NZ1960
Felmersham	Bedfordshire	52.20°N 00.55°W	SP9957
Felmingham	Norfolk	52.81°N 01.33°E	TG2529
Felmore	Essex	51.57°N 00.49°E	TQ7389
Felpham	West Sussex	50.79°N 00.65°W	SU9500
Felsham	Suffolk	52.17°N 00.83°E	TL9457
Felsted	Essex	51.85°N 00.42°E	TL6720
Feltham	Hounslow	51.44°N 00.41°W	TQ1073
Feltham	Somerset	50.94°N 03.09°W	ST2317
Felthamhill	Surrey	51.42°N 00.43°W	TQ0971
Felthorpe	Norfolk	52.71°N 01.19°E	TG1618
Felton	Herefordshire	52.12°N 02.62°W	SO5748
Felton	North Somerset	51.38°N 02.69°W	ST5265
Felton	Northumberland	55.29°N 01.71°W	NU1800
Felton Butler	Shropshire	52.74°N 02.90°W	SJ3917
Feltwell	Norfolk	52.48°N 00.50°E	TL7090

=== Fen ===
Location	Locality	Coordinates (links to map & photo sources)	OS grid reference
Fenay Bridge	Kirklees	53.63°N 01.72°W	SE1815
Fence	Lancashire	53.82°N 02.27°W	SD8237
Fence Houses	Sunderland	54.84°N 01.50°W	NZ3250
Fencott	Oxfordshire	51.83°N 01.17°W	SP5716
Fenderbridge	Perth and Kinross	56.77°N 03.83°W	NN8866
Fen Ditton	Cambridgeshire	52.21°N 00.16°E	TL4860
Fen Drayton	Cambridgeshire	52.29°N 00.05°W	TL3368
Fen End	Solihull	52.37°N 01.67°W	SP2275
Fen End	Lincolnshire	52.76°N 00.16°W	TF2420
Fengate	Cambridgeshire	52.56°N 00.23°W	TL2098
Fengate	Norfolk	52.76°N 01.24°E	TG1924
Fenham	Newcastle upon Tyne	54.97°N 01.65°W	NZ2265
Fenhouses	Lincolnshire	52.94°N 00.14°W	TF2540
Feniscliffe	Lancashire	53.72°N 02.53°W	SD6526
Feniscowles	Lancashire	53.72°N 02.53°W	SD6525
Feniton	Devon	50.78°N 03.29°W	SY0999
Fenlake	Bedfordshire	52.12°N 00.45°W	TL0648
Fenn Green	Shropshire	52.44°N 02.33°W	SO7783
Fennington	Somerset	51.05°N 03.15°W	ST1929
Fenn's Bank	Wrexham	52.94°N 02.74°W	SJ5039
Fenn Street	Kent	51.44°N 00.57°E	TQ7975
Fenny Bentley	Derbyshire	53.04°N 01.74°W	SK1750
Fenny Bridges	Devon	50.77°N 03.26°W	SY1198
Fenny Compton	Warwickshire	52.16°N 01.40°W	SP4152
Fenny Drayton	Leicestershire	52.56°N 01.48°W	SP3596
Fenny Stratford	Milton Keynes	51.99°N 00.71°W	SP8834
Fen Side	Lincolnshire	53.10°N -00.00°E	TF3458
Fenstanton	Cambridgeshire	52.29°N 00.08°W	TL3168
Fenstead End	Suffolk	52.11°N 00.62°E	TL8050
Fen Street (Redgrave)	Suffolk	52.37°N 01.01°E	TM0579
Fen Street (Hopton)	Suffolk	52.37°N 00.90°E	TL9879
Fen Street	Norfolk	52.37°N 01.02°E	TM0680
Fenton	Cambridgeshire	52.39°N 00.07°W	TL3179
Fenton	Northumberland	55.59°N 02.04°W	NT9733
Fenton	Cumbria	54.89°N 02.78°W	NY5056
Fenton	City of Stoke-on-Trent	52.99°N 02.16°W	SJ8944
Fenton (West Lindsey)	Lincolnshire	53.27°N 00.74°W	SK8476
Fenton (South Kesteven)	Lincolnshire	53.04°N 00.70°W	SK8750
Fentonadle	Cornwall	50.57°N 04.71°W	SX0878
Fenton Barns	East Lothian	56.02°N 02.78°W	NT5181
Fenton Low	City of Stoke-on-Trent	53.00°N 02.16°W	SJ8945
Fenton Pits	Cornwall	50.43°N 04.73°W	SX0663
Fenwick	East Ayrshire	55.65°N 04.44°W	NS4643
Fenwick (Matfen)	Northumberland	55.04°N 01.92°W	NZ0572
Fenwick (Kyloe)	Northumberland	55.65°N 01.90°W	NU0640
Fenwick	Doncaster	53.63°N 01.10°W	SE5916

=== Feo-Few ===
Location	Locality	Coordinates (links to map & photo sources)	OS grid reference
Feock	Cornwall	50.20°N 05.05°W	SW8238
Feorlig	Highland	57.39°N 06.51°W	NG2943
Ferguslie Park	Renfrewshire	55.84°N 04.46°W	NS4664
Feriniquarrie	Highland	57.45°N 06.72°W	NG1750
Fern	Buckinghamshire	51.58°N 00.73°W	SU8888
Fern	Angus	56.73°N 02.85°W	NO4861
Fern Bank	Tameside	53.47°N 02.04°W	SJ9798
Ferndale	Kent	51.13°N 00.27°E	TQ5940
Ferndale	Rhondda Cynon Taff	51.65°N 03.46°W	SS9996
Ferndown	Dorset	50.79°N 01.90°W	SU0700
Ferne	Wiltshire	50.99°N 02.10°W	ST9322
Ferness	Highland	57.47°N 03.73°W	NH9644
Ferney Green	Cumbria	54.35°N 02.92°W	SD4096
Fernham	Oxfordshire	51.62°N 01.59°W	SU2992
Fernhill	Bury	53.59°N 02.30°W	SD8011
Fernhill	Rhondda, Cynon, Taff	51.68°N 03.40°W	ST0399
Fern Hill	Suffolk	52.10°N 00.65°E	TL8249
Fernhill	West Sussex	51.15°N 00.14°W	TQ3041
Fernhill Gate	Bolton	53.55°N 02.46°W	SD6907
Fernhill Heath	Worcestershire	52.22°N 02.20°W	SO8659
Fernhurst	West Sussex	51.04°N 00.73°W	SU8928
Fernie	Fife	56.32°N 03.11°W	NO3115
Ferniegair	South Lanarkshire	55.76°N 04.02°W	NS7354
Ferniehirst	Scottish Borders	55.65°N 02.89°W	NT4441
Fernilee	Derbyshire	53.29°N 01.98°W	SK0178
Fernsplatt	Cornwall	50.22°N 05.14°W	SW7641
Ferrensby	North Yorkshire	54.03°N 01.45°W	SE3660
Ferrindonald	Highland	57.09°N 05.88°W	NG6507
Ferring	West Sussex	50.80°N 00.45°W	TQ0902
Ferrybridge	Wakefield	53.71°N 01.28°W	SE4724
Ferryden	Angus	56.69°N 02.47°W	NO7156
Ferry Hill	Cambridgeshire	52.42°N 00.02°E	TL3883
Ferryhill	Durham	54.68°N 01.55°W	NZ2932
Ferryhill	City of Aberdeen	57.12°N 02.11°W	NJ9304
Ferryhill Station	Durham	54.67°N 01.53°W	NZ3031
Ferryside	Carmarthenshire	51.76°N 04.37°W	SN3610
Fersfield	Norfolk	52.40°N 01.02°E	TM0683
Fersit	Highland	56.86°N 04.70°W	NN3578
Feshiebridge	Highland	57.11°N 03.90°W	NH8504
Fetcham	Surrey	51.28°N 00.36°W	TQ1455
Fetlar	Shetland Islands	60.60°N 00.87°W	HU616920
Fetterangus	Aberdeenshire	57.54°N 02.03°W	NJ9850
Fettercairn	Aberdeenshire	56.84°N 02.59°W	NO6473
Fewcott	Oxfordshire	51.93°N 01.23°W	SP5327
Fewston	North Yorkshire	53.98°N 01.71°W	SE1954
Fewston Bents	North Yorkshire	53.98°N 01.71°W	SE1954
