= Llyn Bodgylched =

Protected lake in Anglesey, Wales

- Site of Special Scientific Interest
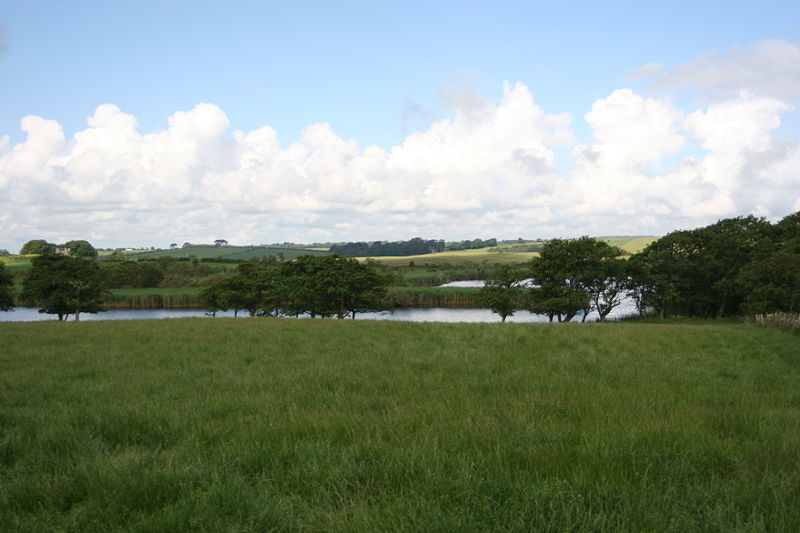

- Location within Wales
- Location of Llyn Bodgylched.
- Area of search: West Gwynedd
- Grid reference: SH5853777055
- Coordinates: 53.271558°N 4.122784°W
- Interest: Biological
- Area: 16.37 ha
- Notification date: 1968

Llyn Bodgylched is a Site of Special Scientific Interest (or SSSI) in Anglesey, North Wales, to the west of Beaumaris. It has been designated as a Site of Special Scientific Interest since January 1968 in an attempt to protect its fragile biological elements, mainly a swamp. The site has an area of 16.37 hectares and is managed by Natural Resources Wales.

== Description ==
Llyn Bodgylched has been designated as a SSSI for its biological interest. The lake is partially impounded by an embankment along its western shoreline and a dam at its southern end. The lake is set in a shallow basin in Precambrian rock of the Mona complex which has been overlain by boulder clay and there are alluvial deposits along the western shore.

== Flora and fauna ==
The lake is dominated by tall fen vegetation, especially common reed, although in some areas bottle sedge bogbean, Yellow flag iris and greater pond sedge are locally dominant and there are patches of common club-rush, reed canary-grass, reedmace and greater tussock-sedge. Species which are uncommon on the island or in northern Wales include Lesser water-plantain, greater spearwort and lesser tussock-sedge occur locally within the fen. The parts of the site which are dominated by purple moor-grass host a diverse flora including petty whin and large populations of saw-wort. Where lime-rich springs emerge, blunt-flowered rush is common and grass of Parnassus and marsh helleborine are found alongside it. It is one of only three sites on Anglesey where the short-spiked bladder sedge had been recorded according to Hugh Davies 1813 book in the island's botany, however, this species has since been shown to be more widespread.

The breeding bird community is of particular importance including such species as mute swan, tufted duck, shoveler, teal, water rail and reed warbler which regularly breed. Over wintering wildfowl occur in small numbers and this site is locally important for shoveler. A small flock of the nominate European subspecies of the greater white-fronted goose is of interest, occurring here well away from the major wintering distribution in southern Britain. The swamp has a roost of common starling while whooper swan and goosander also winter here and rarer visitors have included Cetti's warbler and bittern.

== See also ==
- List of Sites of Special Scientific Interest in Isle of Anglesey
