= St Thomas' Church, Scotton =

Church in North Yorkshire, England

Coordinates: 54.0297°N 1.5038°W

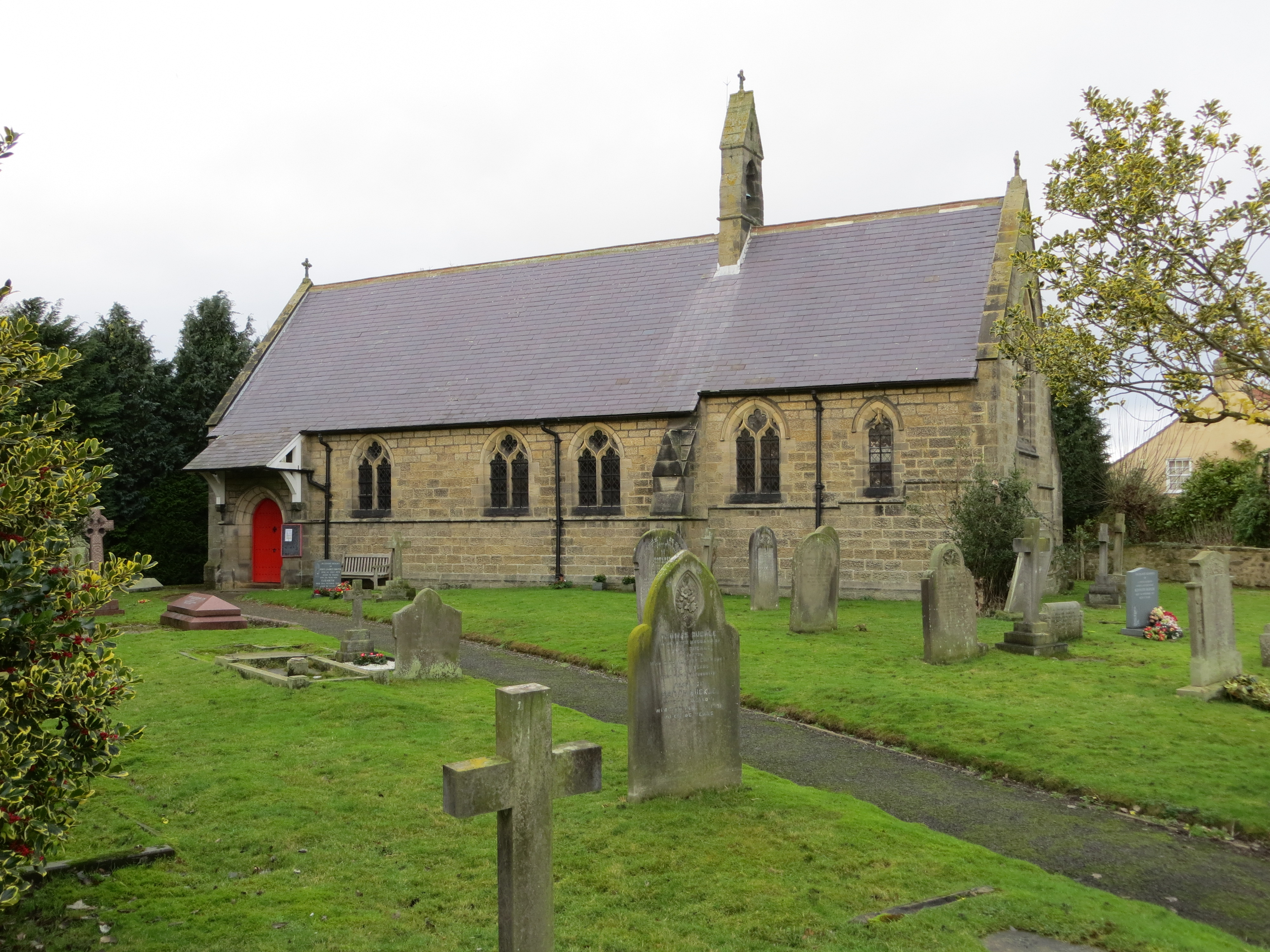
The church, in 2018

St Thomas' Church is the parish church of Scotton, a village near Harrogate in North Yorkshire, in England.

A chapel was built in Scotton in the early Mediaeval period, but it later fell into ruin. In 1349, a new church was founded by William de Nessfield, dedicated to Our Lady. It closed in 1548, and the villagers thereafter worshipped at St Oswald's Church, Farnham. Between 1888 and 1889 a church was built on a new site in Scotton, made available by the destruction of a 60 feet (18 m) high long barrow. The building was designed by C. Hodgson Fowler.

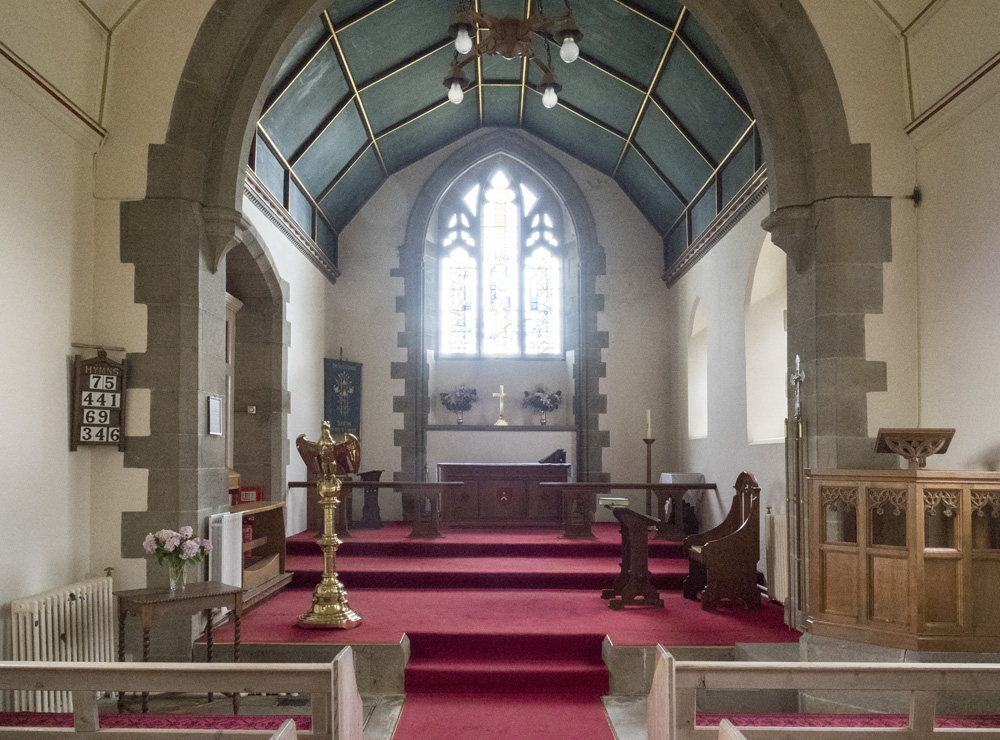
View from the nave into the chancel

The church consists of a nave and chancel, all the same height, with a bellcote atop the roof where they meet. The east window has stained glass designed by Anne Southeran and installed in 1996.
