= Cors Bodwrog =

Protected mine in Anglesey, Wales

- Site of Special Scientific Interest
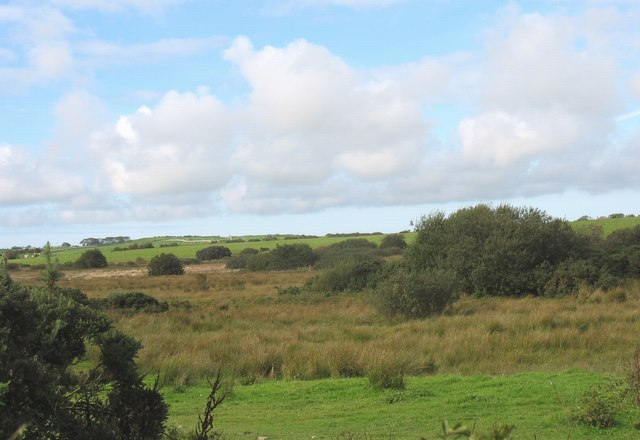

- Location within Wales
- Location of Cors Bodwrog.
- Area of search: West Gwynedd
- Grid reference: SH4070077156
- Coordinates: 53.267°N 4.390°W
- Interest: Biological
- Area: 87.28 hectares (215.7 acres)
- Notification date: 1961

Cors Bodwrog is a mesotrophic mire and a Site of Special Scientific Interest (or SSSI) in Anglesey, North Wales. It has been designated as a Site of Special Scientific Interest since January 1961 in an attempt to protect its fragile biological elements. The site has an area of 87.28 hectares (215.7 acres) and is managed by Natural Resources Wales.

== Type ==
This site is designated due to its biological qualities. SSSIs in Wales have been notified for a total of 142 different animal species and 191 different plant species. Purple moor-grass (Molinia caerulea mire) is the principal vegetation type and a number of uncommon plants grow in Cors Bodwrog including Greater spearwort (Ranunculus lingua) and Lesser bulrush (Typha angustifolia).

The breeding bird community includes: teal, reed warbler, grasshopper warbler and curlew.

== Llyn Hendref ==
Until the mid 1970s, when the land was "improved", Llyn Hendref stood in the middle of the mire. This was a 30 acre lake, 190 feet (58 metres) above sea level. Fish in the lake included trout, perch and bream, and fishing was available without charge. According to the book The Lakes of Wales (1931), the bream were large, the lake tended to be sad-looking, and the fishing was "good at times".

== See also ==
- List of Sites of Special Scientific Interest in Isle of Anglesey
