= River Tutt =

River in North Yorkshire, England

River Tutt Fleet Beck
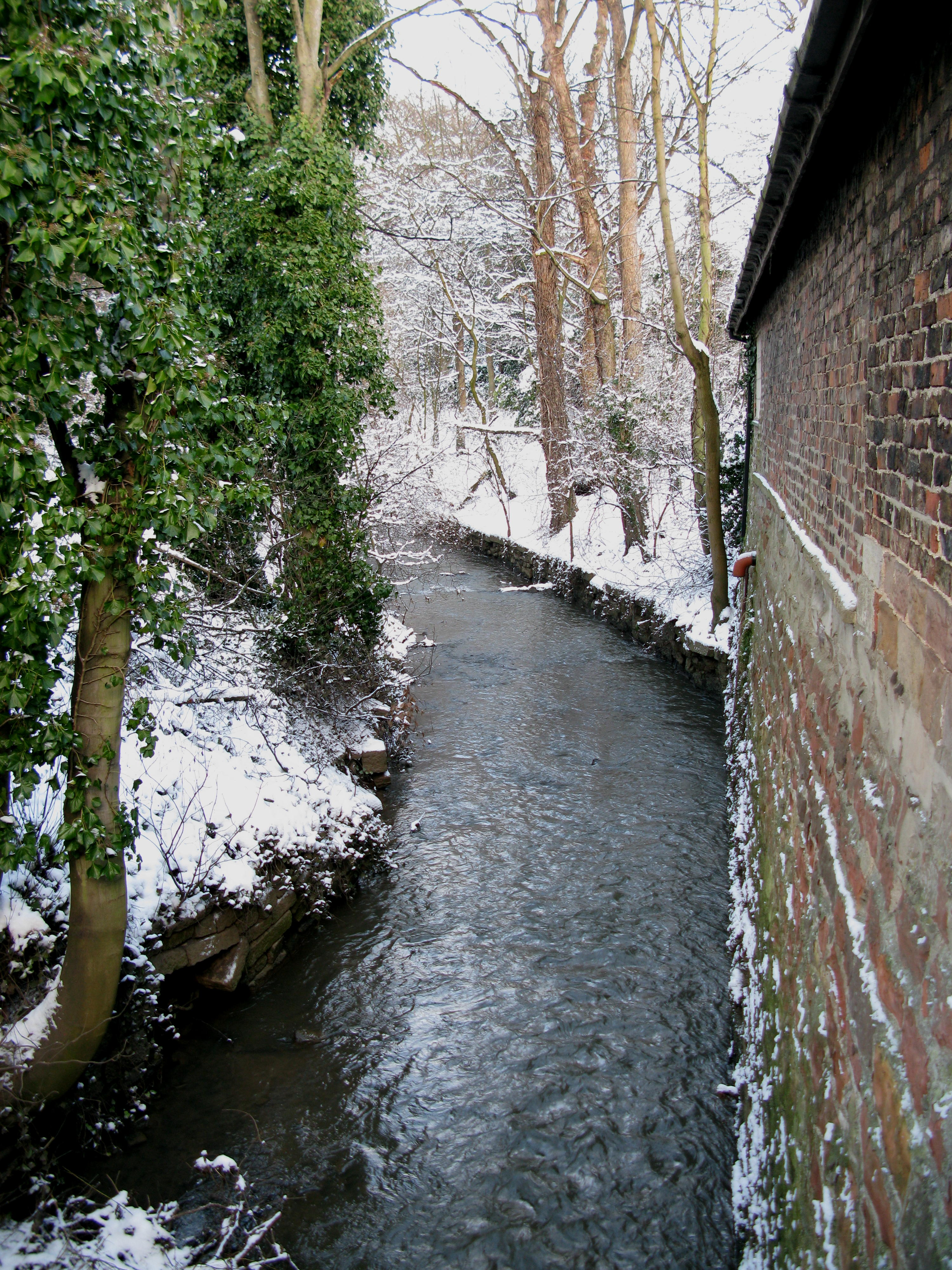
- River Tutt in Boroughbridge

- Location in North Yorkshire

Location
- Country: England
- County: North Yorkshire

Physical characteristics
- Source
  - location: Nidd
  - coordinates: 54.0430°N 1.5326°W
  - elevation: 213 feet (65 m)
- Mouth
  - location: Boroughbridge
  - coordinates: 54.0973°N 1.3942°W
  - elevation: 46 feet (14 m)
- Length: 8.7 miles (14 km)
- Basin size: 17 square miles (45 km^{2})

Basin features
- River system: River Ure

The River Tutt is a 8.7-mile (14 km) long tributary of the River Ure in North Yorkshire, England. The river rises near to the villages of Nidd and Scotton draining mainly arable land north eastwards before emptying into the Ure at Boroughbridge. Where the river joins the Ure in Boroughbridge, has been the site of significant historic flooding. An Environment Agency project to alleviate flooding on the river has seen diversion schemes and pumps added to prevent this.

== Toponymy ==
The river is known as the Tutt for only about 4 miles (7 km) of its length, and is variously known as Jumwell, Shaw and Occaney Beck in its early stages. It is also known as Tutt Beck, Fleet Beck and Minskip Beck. The derivation of the name Tutt for the river has many explanations; one theory is that it is from a Viking word, another states that it comes from the Roman goddess Tutelina, who looked after corn when it was in storage.

A H Smith, writing in The Place Names of the West Riding of Yorkshire, lists the name as being badly translated down the centuries. Smith does postulate that due to a metathesis, the original listing from 1439, Riovolum de Ptruth, could derive through errors in writing from the Old English for Conduit.

== Course ==
The river rises to the east of the village of Nidd as Jumwell Beck, about 1 mile (1.5 km) north east of the River Nidd, but flows east towards Staveley, instead of south. It flows in between the villages of Brearton and Scotton, where it takes on Percy Beck from the south. It then absorbs other becks around Farnham and in the process becomes Shaw Beck before being named Occaney Beck as it pass the hamlet of Occaney.

As it passes north of Staveley Nature Reserve, it appears on Ordnance Survey mapping as River Tutt or Fleet Beck for the first time, though the Environment Agency list it as starting at Nidd. It flows north west of Minskip, under the A1(M) and the A168 road before entering Boroughbridge and then running into the River Ure.

Though it is only a small river, it is a main tributary of the River Ure and is prone to floodwaters backflowing upstream from the River Ure and inundating Boroughbridge. In 1987, after a history of significant flooding in 1899, 1901, 1968 and 1982, The Tutt Diversion Scheme was implemented which would prevent water flowing up the river from the Ure when either, or both, were in flood. However, pumps installed on the river to prevent the Ure flooding the Tutt were accidentally reversed in January 2005, putting Boroughbridge at risk of a flooding event. The drainage basin covers an area of 17 square miles (45 km^{2}) and as it a lowland catchment, (Note: The elevation of the area that it drains is between 33 feet (10 m) and 243 feet (74 m) above sea level.) it experiences a lower rainfall average than most of the tributaries of the River Ure as they drain off the adjacent moorlands.

In the 13th century, the end of the river was the location of one of two corn mills in Boroughbridge.

During the 17th and 18th centuries, fishermen worked on the river near to where it empties into the Ure at Boroughbridge. Their trade lives on in the names of the road by the rivermouth; Fishergate.

== Geology ==
In its early stages, the beck meanders over a magnesian limestone landscape, though as it passes Staveley, it drains a mainly arable landscape which is largely devoid of woodland. The area around Occaney beck has been historically quarried for fluvio-glacial terrace deposits of sand and gravel. Other tests have proved the existence of sand in the area around the beck.

== Natural history ==
The river is classified as being heavily modified, and much work has been undertaken by the Environment Agency and local volunteers to raise the watercourses' standard. Work by the Yorkshire Wildlife Trust has seen the return of many animals such as otters and herons. They have also installed logs in the river around the lakes in Staveley to provide shelter for fish. Whilst the presence of Cyprinid fish and brown trout in the watercourse is "likely", despite the poor chemical composition of the water, the river is noted for its Himalayan Balsam and Giant Hogweed. Mink faeces have also been observed on the river.

The Environment Agency have stated that they wish to divert water from the Tutt into the lakes at Staveley in times of heavy rainfall to help alleviate the possibility of flooding in Boroughbridge.

== Crossings ==
In 17th century, one of the Devil's Arrows was felled and the stone used to make a bridge over the river in Boroughbridge. This is widely believed to be the St Helena Bridge as an order of the Justices from 1621 at Knaresborough, details its purpose. The bridge also had eel traps installed on the upstream side.

The Fishergate Bridge was built by Blind Jack Metcalf in 1754. The bridge and a retaining wall, were washed away in the Great Flood of 1883.
