= Listed buildings in Farnham, North Yorkshire =

Farnham is a civil parish in the county of North Yorkshire, England. It contains seven listed buildings that are recorded in the National Heritage List for England. Of these, one is listed at Grade I, the highest of the three grades, and the others are at Grade II, the lowest grade. The parish contains the village of Farnham and the surrounding area. The listed buildings consist of a church, tombs in the churchyard, houses and a telephone kiosk.

== Key ==
Grade	Criteria
I	Buildings of exceptional interest, sometimes considered to be internationally important
II	Buildings of national importance and special interest

== Buildings ==
Name and location	Photograph	Date	Notes	Grade
St Oswald's Church; 54.04008°N 1.46988°W		12th century	The church has been altered and extended through the centuries, including a restoration in 1854 by George Gilbert Scott. It is built in limestone and gritstone and has a stone slate roof. The church consists of a nave, north and south aisles, a south porch, a chancel, and a west tower embraced by the aisles. The tower has two-light bell openings, a clock face on the south side, and a plain parapet with stone spouts and corner pinnacles. The chancel contains Norman round-arched windows, the nave windows are Gothic, and the west window has three lights and a Tudor arch.	I
The Old Manor House; 54.03878°N 1.46659°W		1667	The house is in gritstone on a plinth, with quoins, a floor band, and a pantile roof with one course of stone slate at the eaves, bulbous kneelers and coped gables. There are two storeys, five bays, and a rear outshut. The doorway has a moulded surround with quoined jambs, and a shallow dated triangular-arched lintel. Above it are two rectangular windows with chamfered surrounds, and the other windows are mullioned.	II
Two chest tombs south of the porch 54.03986°N 1.46991°W	—	Early 18th century	The two tombs in the churchyard of St Oswald's Church are in gritstone. Each tomb has a moulded plinth and two courses of stone blocks supporting a thick moulded slab. The inscriptions are illegible.	II
Gibbet Cottage; 54.03255°N 1.46112°W		1795	The house is in limestone on a rendered plinth, with quoins, and a pantile roof with one course of stone slate, and the remains of a kneeler and gable coping on the left. There are two storeys, three bays, and a rear outshut. Above the doorway is a plaque with a moulded surround containing initials and the date, over which is a cornice on stone brackets. The windows are sashes.	II
Two chest tombs south of the chancel 54.03993°N 1.46976°W	—	Late 18th to early 19th century	The pair of chest tombs in the churchyard of St Oswald's Church are in limestone and gritstone, and have illegible inscriptions. The southern tomb has end panels carved with a circular flower motif; the corners have stylised Corinthian pilasters, and the sides have a recessed central panel. The northern tomb has end panels with oval fan motifs in recessed panels, and the top slab is moulded.	II
Farnham Hall; 54.03875°N 1.46701°W	—	Early 18th century	The house is rendered, and has a stone slate roof with stone copings. There are two storeys and four bays. The doorway has a cornice, and the windows are sashes, those at the rear with architraves, fluted pilasters, and entablatures.	II
Telephone kiosk 54.04014°N 1.46819°W		1935	The K6 type telephone kiosk was designed by Giles Gilbert Scott. Constructed in cast iron with a square plan and a dome, it has three unperforated crowns in the top panels.	II
