= Glannau Rhoscolyn =

Protected area in Anglesey, Wales

- Site of Special Scientific Interest
- Location within Wales
- Location of Glannau Rhoscolyn.
- Area of search: West Gwynedd
- Grid reference: SH2572175563
- Coordinates: 53.24839°N 4.6135542°W
- Interest: Biological and Geological
- Area: 145.49 hectares (359.5 acres)
- Notification date: 1961

Glannau Rhoscolyn is a Site of Special Scientific Interest (or SSSI) in Anglesey, North Wales, and extends along the west coast of Holy Island, Anglesey for approximately 6.5 km (4.0 mi) (from Porthygaran to Silver Bay). It has been designated as a Site of Special Scientific Interest since January 1961 in an attempt to protect its fragile biological and geological elements. The site has an area of 145.49 hectares (359.5 acres) and is managed by Natural Resources Wales.

== Type ==
This SSSI has been notified as being of both geological and ornithological importance.

The exposed coast around Rhoscolyn exhibit some of the finest examples of polyphase fold structures known in the south of Britain and are amongst the most intensively studied sites in the British Isles.

The spotted rock rose (Tuberaria guttata) is found here in two locations. Only nine populations of the spotted rockrose are known in the UK, a further six locations are also found on Anglesey with the remaining site on Pen Llŷn.

Among the birds found here are: the chough (Pyrrhocorax pyrrhocorax), for which the site is also selected, and the peregrine Falco peregrinus; others include: breeding shag (Phalacrocorax aristotelis), raven (Corvus corax) and kestrel (Falco tinnunculus), whitethroat (Sylvia communis), wheatear (Oenanthe oenanthe) and stonechat (Saxicola torquata).

== See also ==
- List of Sites of Special Scientific Interest in Isle of Anglesey
