= Knaresborough Hoard =

Metalwork hoard from North Yorkshire, England

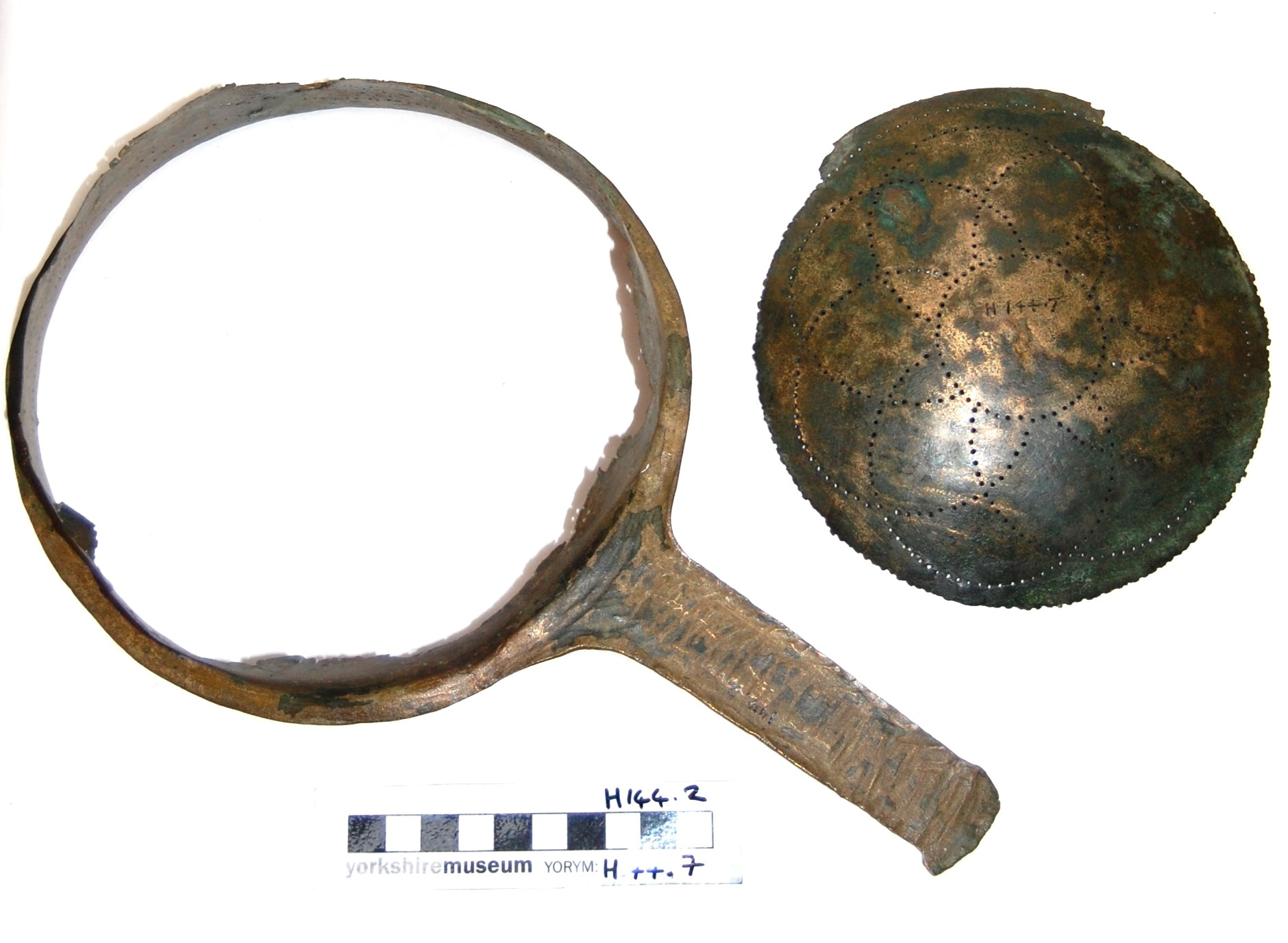
- A copper alloy strainer from the hoard
- Created: 300-410
- Period/culture: Roman
- Discovered: 1864 near Knaresborough, North Yorkshire
- Present location: Roman Gallery, Yorkshire Museum, York
- Identification: YORYM: H144

The Knaresborough Hoard is a hoard of Romano-British metalwork from near Knaresborough, North Yorkshire. It is the largest hoard of Romano-British copper-alloy vessels discovered to date in Britain. A partial catalogue of the hoard was published by Eggers in 1966. Between 2019 and 2021 it was studied as part of the Knaresborough and Irchester Roman Hoards Project (KNIROH) at Newcastle University.

Two important Roman roads ran through the area: Cade’s Road on the eastern side and Dere Street to the west, a major route to York and Hadrian’s Wall. There were a number of wealthy Roman villas in the area and the hoard may have come from one of these.

== Discovery ==
The hoard was discovered near Knaresborough around 1864 by men working on a land drain. Recent research looked at several different antiquarian accounts of the discovery of the hoard and suggests that it was likely to have been found at Farnham, north of Knaresborough in "The Bottoms" marsh. In a 1876 lecture to the Yorkshire Philosophical Society Rev Canon James Raine records that the finders brought the hoard "in a large sack" to Thomas Gott. Gott donated 8 vessels to the Yorkshire Museum in 1864 and the remainder in 1876.

== Contents of the hoard ==
The hoard is a mixed metalwork hoard. It contains several different copper alloy vessels: a large fluted bowl, six hemispherical 'Irchester' type bowls, four strainers with handles, a strainer bowl, a handled pan, two plates, a scale pan, and a large jar in the shape of a pottery vessel. Iron objects in the hoard include two iron axes, an adze, and a smith's cross-pane hammer. It can be dated to the very late 4th century or later on the basis of the iron spur and silver parallels of some of the vessel types in other Romano-British hoards. When it was originally discovered, the hoard was much larger. Thomas Gott was an ironmonger and it is recorded that a "servant" accidentally melted down a number of Roman vessels after erroneously thinking that they were scrap metal. The original hoard thus also contained: several other large copper alloy plates, flat plates with handles, other dishes and bowls, a "great quantity" of iron nails, and a fire grate.

== Public display ==
The hoard as it survives was donated to the Yorkshire Museum in two batches in 1864 and 1876. The 1881 handbook to the museum records that it was on display in the 'Antiquities' room in the Hospitium in the York Museum Gardens.

== See also ==
- List of Roman hoards in Great Britain
