= Fedw Fawr =

Area of eastern Anglesey, Wales

Coordinates: 53.3154°N 4.0994°W

Fedw Fawr coastline

Fedw Fawr is an area on the east coast of Anglesey, North Wales, situated just under four miles north of Beaumaris. It is part of the Arfordir Gogleddol Penmon Site of Special Scientific Interest and is managed by the National Trust. The site covers 20 hectares most of which is made up of peaty gley soil.

The cliffs at Fedw Fawr support the only black guillemot colony in Wales.
