= Fferam Uchaf =

Protected area in Anglesey, Wales

- Site of Special Scientific Interest
- Location within Wales
- Location of Fferam Uchaf.
- Area of search: West Gwynedd
- Grid reference: SH3610486763
- Coordinates: 53.352°N 4.464°W
- Interest: Geological
- Area: 1.05 hectares (2.6 acres)
- Notification date: 2001

Fferam Uchaf is a Site of Special Scientific Interest (or SSSI) in Anglesey, North Wales, for its exposures of Llanvirn (Ordovician) rocks. It has been designated as a Site of Special Scientific Interest since October 2001 in an attempt to protect its fragile Geological elements. The site has an area of 1.05 hectares (2.6 acres), is managed by Natural Resources Wales, and is 1.5 km (0.93 mi) north-east of Llanddeusant.

== Type ==
The site is designated due to its geological qualities. In Wales, geological sites range from quarries to rocky outcrops and massive sea-cliffs. Thirty percent of SSSIs in Wales are notified for geological and geomorphological features.

The site has a number of small rock outcrops including a quarry on farmland approximately and is considered to contain the best examples of Llanvirn rocks in Anglesey, a Series that is otherwise poorly represented in North Wales. Fferam-uchaf shows small but stratigraphically important outcrops, but is an important site for an understanding of Lower Ordovician palaeogeography.

== See also ==
- List of Sites of Special Scientific Interest in Isle of Anglesey
