= Scotton Old Hall =

Building in Scotton, North Yorkshire, England

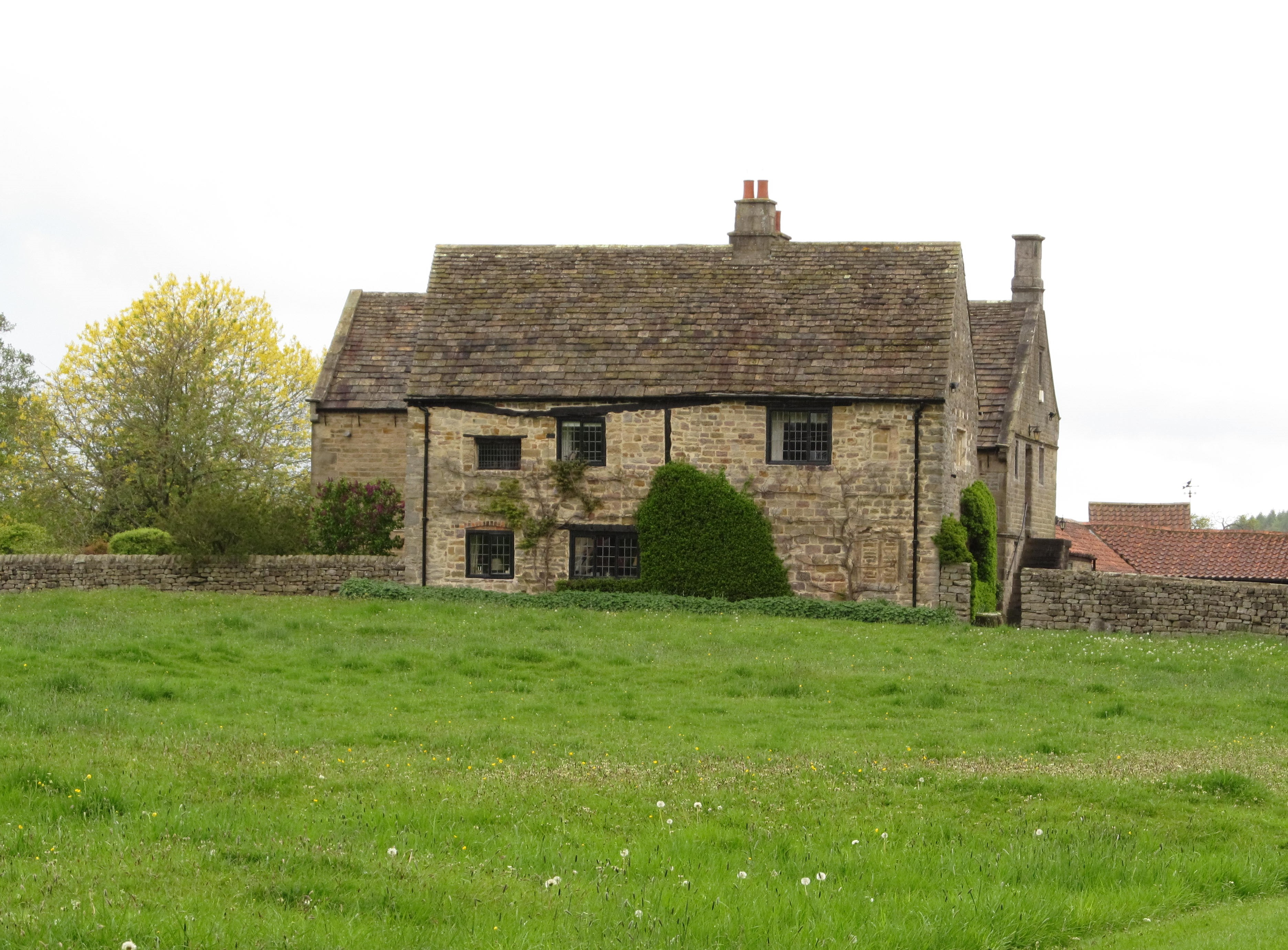
The building, in 2021

Scotton Old Hall is a historic building in Scotton, a village near Harrogate in North Yorkshire, in England.

The house was built in the 15th century. During the mid 16th century, it was occupied by the Steward of Fountains Abbey. Later in the century, it was owned by Dennis Bainbridge, who married Guy Fawkes' widowed mother; Fawkes may have spent time at the house as a child. The house was remodelled in the 17th century, and from 1663 was owned by the Quaker George Watkinson. The upper floor of the west wing was converted so that it could be accessed from external stairs, a style used for early Quaker meeting houses elsewhere, although it could simply have been for agricultural use. The house was further altered in the 19th century, during which time it was used as a farmhouse. The building was restored in about 1980, and the Harrogate Advertiser describes it as having been used as a village hall around this time. The house has been grade II* listed since 1952.

The house incorporates timber framing from the 15th century, and is in limestone, gritstone and cobbles, with quoins and a stone slate roof. There is a hall and cross wings, the hall with two storeys and two bays, an east wing with three bays, and a west wing with six bays and an attic. The entrance in the west wing has a round-arched doorway with a moulded surround, imposts and a keystone. A continuous hood mould is carried round much of the house. On the south front is a doorway with a chamfered surround and a pointed arch. The windows vary, and some are mullioned. Inside, the hall and west wing have large back-to-back fireplaces, the one to the hall having some original woodwork. There is also an early wooden partition between the hall and east wing with blocked doorways, while the east wing has 16th-century graffiti.

== See also ==
- Grade II* listed buildings in North Yorkshire (district)
- Listed buildings in Scotton, Harrogate
