= Listed buildings in Scotton, Harrogate =

Scotton, Harrogate is a civil parish in the county of North Yorkshire, England. It contains ten listed buildings that are recorded in the National Heritage List for England. Of these, one is listed at Grade II*, the middle of the three grades, and the others are at Grade II, the lowest grade. The parish contains the village of Scotton and the surrounding area. The listed buildings consist of houses, a barn, and items in and around a Quaker burial ground.

== Key ==
Grade	Criteria
II*	Particularly important buildings of more than special interest
II	Buildings of national importance and special interest

== Buildings ==
Name and location	Photograph	Date	Notes	Grade
Manor Farm House; 54.02737°N 1.50303°W	—	16th century	A farmhouse, later a private house, it has a timber framed core, enclosed in stone, and has a pantile roof with stone coped gables and kneelers. There are two storeys and four bays, and a rear outshut. On the street and garden fronts are doorways and casement windows.	II
The Old Manor House; 54.02985°N 1.50376°W		16th century	A timber framed house enclosed in the 19th and 20th centuries in limestone and gritstone, with a pantile roof with stone slates to the eaves. There are two storeys, and the earlier range has three bays and a single-bay wing at the north end. Inside, there is extensive remaining timber framing.	II
Scotton Old Hall; 54.03097°N 1.50490°W		17th century (probable)	The house incorporates timber framing from the 15th century, and is in limestone, gritstone and cobbles, with quoins and a stone slate roof. There is a hall and cross wings, the hall with two storeys and two bays, an east wing with three bays, and a west wing with six bays and an attic. The entrance in the west wing has a round-arched doorway with a moulded surround, imposts and a keystone. A continuous hood mould is carried round much of the house. On the south front is a doorway with a chamfered surround and a pointed arch. The windows vary, and some are mullioned.	II*
Barn northwest of Scotton Old Hall; 54.03120°N 1.50531°W	—	17th century	The barn is in stone, with quoins and a stone slate roof. There is a single storey, ten bays and a rear outshut. In the centre is a cart entrance with a raised segmental arch and chamfered quoined jambs. Elsewhere, there are more doorways, windows, slit vents, a loading door, and an owl hole in the apex of a gable. At the rear is a large gabled wheelhouse with a pantile roof.	II
Walls and ruined building, Quaker Burial Ground; 54.03144°N 1.50294°W		17th century	The walls are in gritstone, they enclose an area about 35 metres (115 ft) square, and are about 1.5 metres (4 ft 11 in) in height. In the southwest corner are the remains of a building, marked by quoins.	II
Headstone of Ann Hogg, Quaker Burial Ground; 54.03130°N 1.50282°W	—	1671	The headstone is in gritstone, and is about 50 centimetres (20 in) in height. It consists of a single circular block on a slightly shouldered base, and contains a well cut inscription.	II
Headstone of Margret Middleton, Quaker Burial Ground; 54.03120°N 1.50276°W	—	1676	The headstone is in gritstone, and is about 40 centimetres (16 in) in height. It consists of a single circular block on a neck, widening to flat shoulders at the base. It contains a well cut inscription.	II
Three chest tombs, Quaker Burial Ground; 54.03120°N 1.50299°W		Early to mid-18th century	The chest tombs are in gritstone, and commemorate members of the Watkinson family. They are to the north of the south wall of the burial ground, and have been disturbed by the growth of a tree. Each tomb consists of a moulded slab on a plinth of four or more blocks. The middle tomb has the remains of an inscription, and the other inscriptions are illegible.	II
Headstone of John Dodson, Quaker Burial Ground; 54.03126°N 1.50301°W	—	1736	The headstone is in gritstone, and is about 50 centimetres (20 in) in height. It consists of a single straight-sided block with a cambered top edge. On it is a well cut but weathered inscription.	II
Scotton Lodge; 54.02619°N 1.50555°W	—	Early 19th century	The house is in gritstone on a plinth, with a hipped slate roof. There are two storeys and fronts of two and three bays. The central doorway has a moulded surround, a fanlight and a cornice, and the windows are sashes with incised wedge lintels.	II
