= Scotton, Harrogate =

Village and civil parish in North Yorkshire, England

Coordinates: 54.027681°N 1.504145°W

Scotton
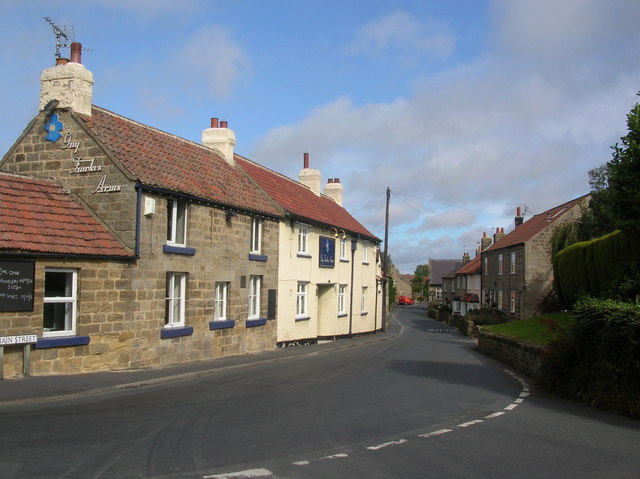
- The Guy Fawkes public house (centre)

- Location within North Yorkshire
- Population: 624 (2011 census)
- OS grid reference: SE327592
- Unitary authority: North Yorkshire
- Ceremonial county: North Yorkshire
- Region: Yorkshire and the Humber
- Country: England
- Sovereign state: United Kingdom
- Post town: KNARESBOROUGH
- Postcode district: HG5
- Dialling code: 01423
- Police: North Yorkshire
- Fire: North Yorkshire
- Ambulance: Yorkshire
- UK Parliament: Harrogate and Knaresborough

Scotton is a small village and civil parish in the county of North Yorkshire, England with a population of 524 in the 2001 census, increasing to 624 at the 2011 Census. It is 3 miles (5 km) north of Harrogate, 1.2 miles (2 km) north west of Knaresborough and is just north of the River Nidd where it flows through Nidd Gorge. However, all the watercourses through the village and the parish flow eastwards via the River Tutt and empty into the River Ure, despite Scotton being very close to the Nidd.

Until 1974 it was part of the West Riding of Yorkshire. From 1974 to 2023 it was part of the Borough of Harrogate, it is now administered by the unitary North Yorkshire Council.

== History ==
The name Scotton derives from the Old English Scotttūn meaning 'settlement of the Scots'.

The village was mentioned in the Domesday Book as Scotone and was listed as belonging to Gilbert Tison with only two households.

=== Scotton in 1881 ===
On 16 April 1881, the Knaresborough Post published a long description and history of the village, which at that time had approximately three hundred inhabitants, living in around seventy houses. The paper described it thus:

[The houses are] grouped or planted singly by the sides of the lane or village street, which is very narrow and crooked at all seasons of the year, and in the winter very dirty. With the exception of three or four, the buildings are all small, old and mean; there is an appearance of dilapidation and decay about the place, as if it was a corner of Noman's land, and nobody cared for its well being.

In 1881, the village had about twelve farmers, mostly relatively poor, and four public houses; the newspaper suggested that the number of pubs was associated with the farmers' poverty. The village had a Methodist chapel, a board school, and "an old Quakers' burial ground". Three headstones, a set of three chest tombs, and the walls of the burial ground, still exist and are listed. As of 1881, there still existed two hall houses, one having belonged to the house of Percy, and the other to the Pulleyns, an old Norman family. Within walking distance of the village was a "flax mill or thread manufactory", and a defunct tannery and bleach ground. The village had a wheelwright, a blacksmith, a shoemaker, and a couple of grocery shops.

The newspaper's historian found that Scotton was an Anglo-Saxon word of uncertain meaning, and that, from the Domesday Book onward, the first three landowners in the village were Kings Thanes Giselbert Tyson, Scotone Ramechil, and Robert de Bruis or Bruce, all Normans. A chapel was endowed in Scotton in 1349 by William de Nessfield (actually from Nesfield, so not Norman), "the greatest public benefactor that Scotten ever had, yet he and his works are forgotten". The newspaper also says that some of the Percy family did not just own land; they actually lived in Scotton, in a building which is now listed, and called The Old Manor House:

[As of 1881] a part of [the Percys'] mansion yet remains near the middle of the village, close to the street;; until recently the oldest part was a timber-built erection of the early Tudor age, probably the work of Sir Robert Percy; on the ceiling of one of the rooms were the arms of the family, the lion rampant, their more ancient badge, the crescent, also appeared. The remainder of the house was of stone, of a more modern date; the whole has been more recently renovated, or partly rebuilt, and the antique features partly obliterated.

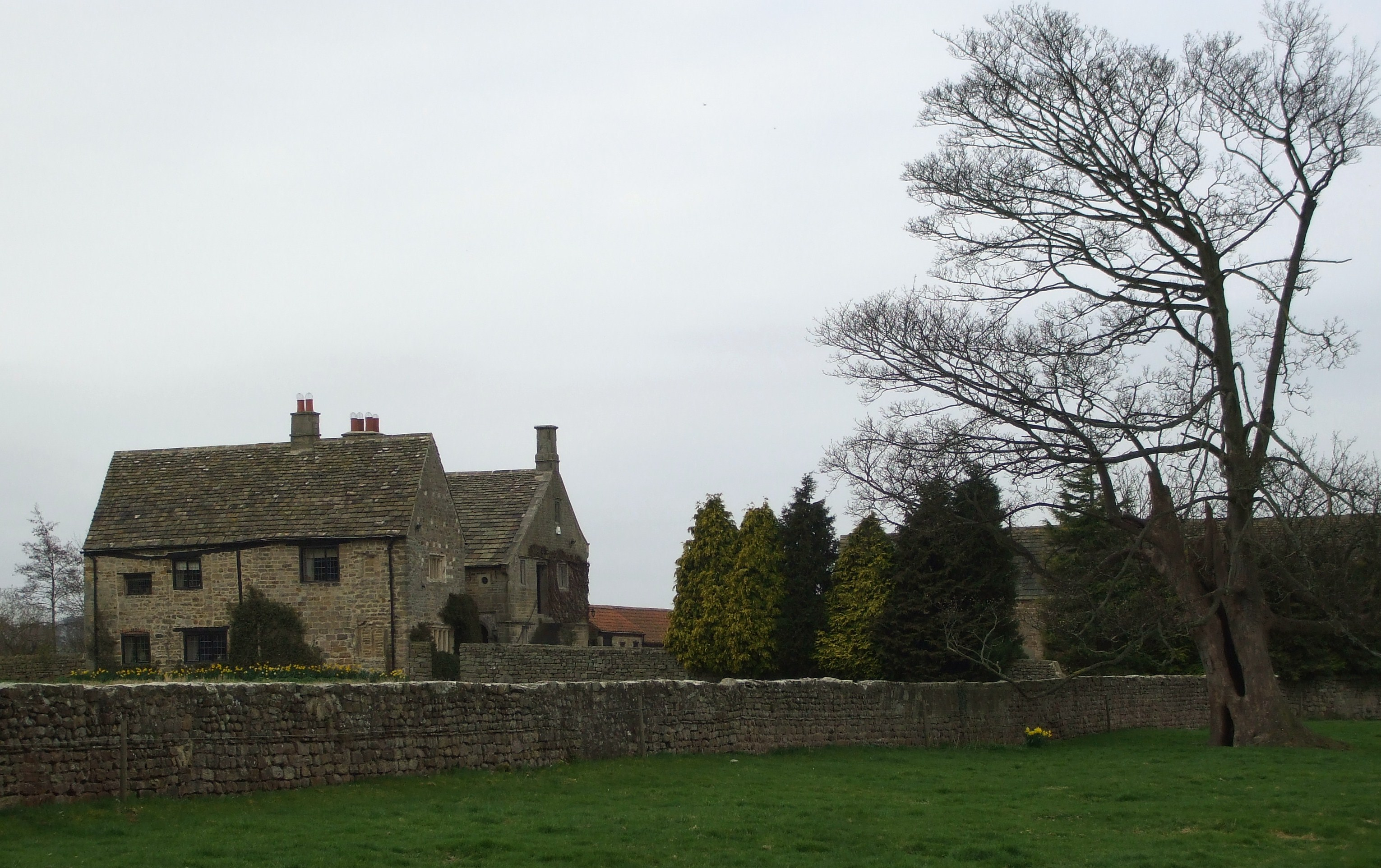
Scotton Old Hall, 2011

The paper goes on to say that the Pulleyns' mansion still existed in the village in 1881, and that the family was related to the Slingsbys, and resided in the village for "many generations". The building is now called Scotton Old Hall, and is a listed building.

[As of 1881] their mansion yet remains a building of considerable size, originally in the Elizabethan style of architecture, but has undergone so many alterations in more recent times that its true characteristics are lost. It is now used as a farmhouse, and belongs to the family of Slingsby of Scriven.

=== Guy Fawkes ===
According to the Knaresborough Post of 1881, the house of Dionis Baynebrigge in Scotton was the home of Guy Fawkes at some time during his teenage years - certainly in 1592 - and he is likely to have associated with local Catholic families, such as the Percys and Pulleyns. Scotton has a Guy Fawkes Night celebration of his failed plot to destroy the Houses of Parliament. The village has an annual summer fete called the Scotton Feast. It was not held in 2005 for the first time in several years (the organising committee claimed that it was because of a lack of support from the village), but returned in 2006. One of the old houses near the present day church was the setting of a local folktale that the Gunpowder plot was concocted there; however, a local history determined that there is no evidence of Fawkes visiting the village after 1603, which makes this tale extremely unlikely.

== Amenities, religion and social life ==
Apart from the Guy Fawkes Arms public house, the village has little in the way of public amenities. It has a village hall, a cricket team and a boys and girls junior football teams, but no shop, as the post office closed down rather than become a national lottery outlet. There is a Methodist church and the Anglican St Thomas' Church, Scotton. This was consecrated in May 1889; previous to this, worship used to be held in a house in the village.

Scotton Cricket Club play in the Nidderdale Cricket League with the 1st XI in the 2nd division, and the 2nd XI in the 8th division of the same league.

== Roads and transport ==
Scotton is sometimes used as a shortcut by people wishing to travel from the A6055 to the B6165 and vice versa.

== See also ==
- Listed buildings in Scotton, Harrogate
