= Glannau Penmon =

Protected area in Anglesey, Wales

Glannau Penmon - Biwmares
- Site of Special Scientific Interest
- Location within Wales
- Location of Glannau Penmon - Biwmares.
- Area of search: West Gwynedd
- Grid reference: SH6211778674
- Coordinates: 53.287°N 4.070°W
- Interest: Biological and Geological
- Area: 170.87 hectares (422.2 acres)
- Notification date: 1957

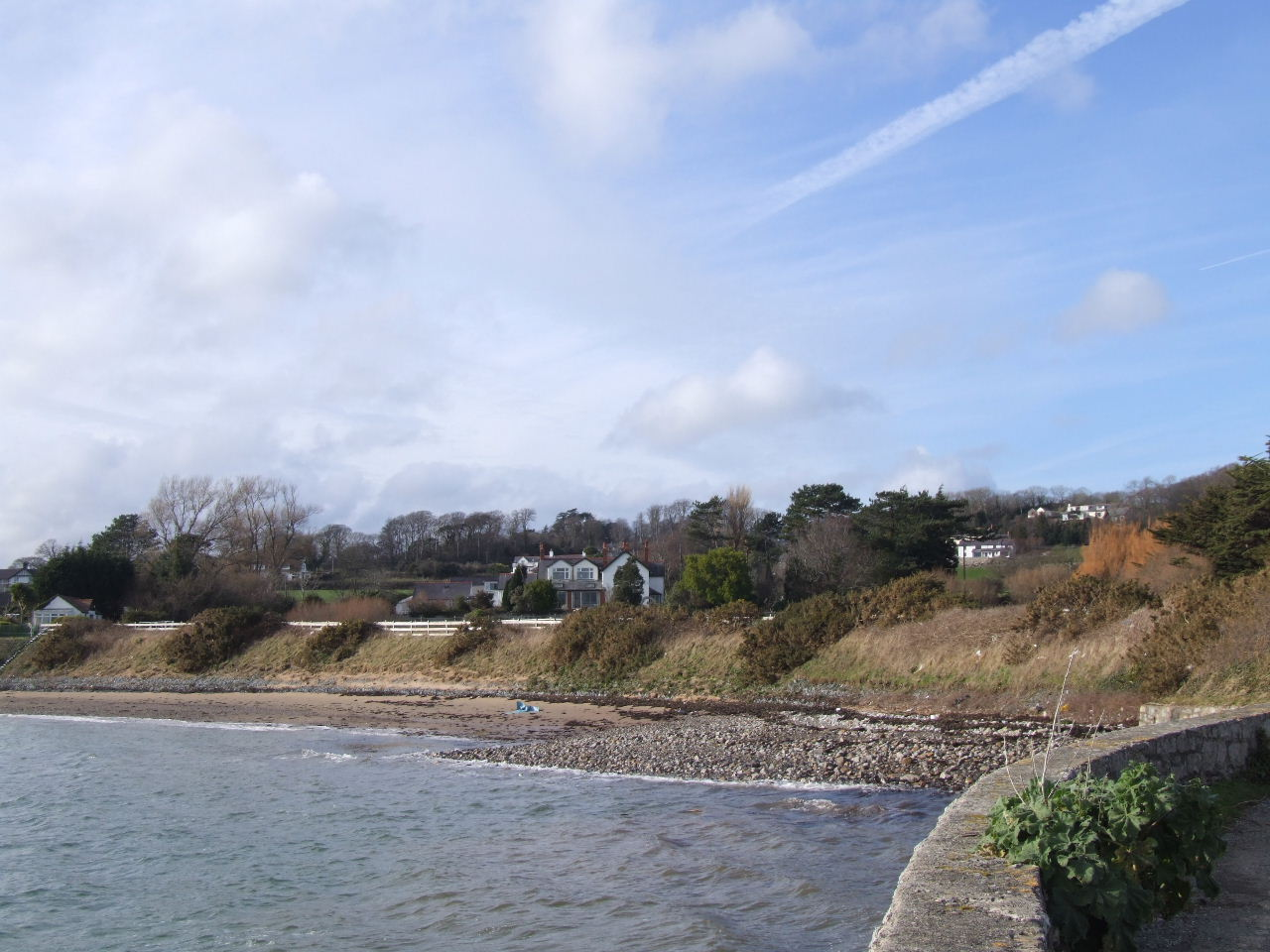
Aberlleiniog, Penmon, Angelesey, Wales

Glannau Penmon - Biwmares is a Site of Special Scientific Interest (or SSSI) in Anglesey, North Wales. It has been designated as a Site of Special Scientific Interest since January 1957 in an attempt to protect its fragile biological and geological elements. The site has an area of 170.87 hectares (422.2 acres) and is managed by Natural Resources Wales.

== Type and features ==
This SSSI has been notified as being of both geological and biological importance and the following are considered to be of Special Scientific Interest:

1. Communities of animals and plants of mixed sediment and of muddy gravel shores.
2. Four communities of restricted national distribution:

- Piddocks burrowed into lower shore limestone overgrown with serrated wrack.
- Sponges, sea-squirts and serrated wrack on tide-swept lower shore rock.
- Sponges, sea-squirts, red seaweeds and serrated wrack found on a tideswept mixture of mud, sand, cobbles and pebbles.
- Lower shore muddy gravel inhabited by a diverse group of small marine

worms.
3. Two species-rich communities of marine plants and animals:

- Sponges, sea-squirts and sea-mats on bedrock overhangs.
- Serrated wrack and various animals under lower shore boulders.

4. A succession of ice-age sediments, exposed in the soft coastal cliffs and foreshore at Lleiniog

== See also ==
- List of Sites of Special Scientific Interest in Isle of Anglesey
