= Henborth =

Protected area in Anglesey, Wales

- Site of Special Scientific Interest
- Location within Wales
- Location of Henborth.
- Area of search: West Gwynedd
- Grid reference: SH3205393118
- Coordinates: 53.408075°N 4.5280616°W
- Interest: Geological
- Area: 10.96 ha
- Notification date: 1989

Henborth is a Site of Special Scientific Interest (or SSSI) in Anglesey, North Wales. It has been designated as a Site of Special Scientific Interest since October 1989 in an attempt to protect its fragile geological elements. The site has an area of 10.96 hectares and is managed by Natural Resources Wales.

== Type ==
This site is designated due to its geological qualities. In Wales, geological sites range from quarries to rocky outcrops and massive sea-cliffs. 30% of SSSIs in Wales are notified for geological and geomorphological features.

== See also ==
- List of Sites of Special Scientific Interest in Isle of Anglesey
