= Llanbadrig - Dinas Gynfor =

Protected area in Anglesey, Wales

- Site of Special Scientific Interest
- Location within Wales
- Location of Llanbadrig - Dinas Gynfor.
- Area of search: West Gwynedd
- Grid reference: SH3913595086
- Coordinates: 53.427956°N 4.4226316°W
- Interest: Geological
- Area: 26.49 ha
- Notification date: 1957

Llanbadrig - Dinas Gynfor is a Site of Special Scientific Interest (or SSSI) in Anglesey, North Wales. It has been designated as a Site of Special Scientific Interest since January 1957 in an attempt to protect its fragile geological elements. The site has an area of 26.49 hectares and is managed by Natural Resources Wales.

== Type and features ==
This site is designated because of its geological qualities. In Wales, geological sites range from quarries to rocky outcrops and massive sea-cliffs. 30% of SSSIs in Wales are notified for geological and geomorphological features. This site has 3 special features:

1. Precambrian rocks exposed in disused quarries, coastal cliffs and on the foreshore. The rocks around Llanbadrig are some of the oldest found in southern Britain: formed 570 million years ago.
2. Arenig-Llanvirn (Ordovician) rocks exposed in inland outcrops, coastal cliffs and on the foreshore.
3. Caledonian structures (folds and fractures) exposed in coastal cliffs.

== See also ==
- List of Sites of Special Scientific Interest in Isle of Anglesey
