= Llyn Traffwll =

Lake in Anglesey, Wales

Coordinates: 53.26340°N 4.51092°W

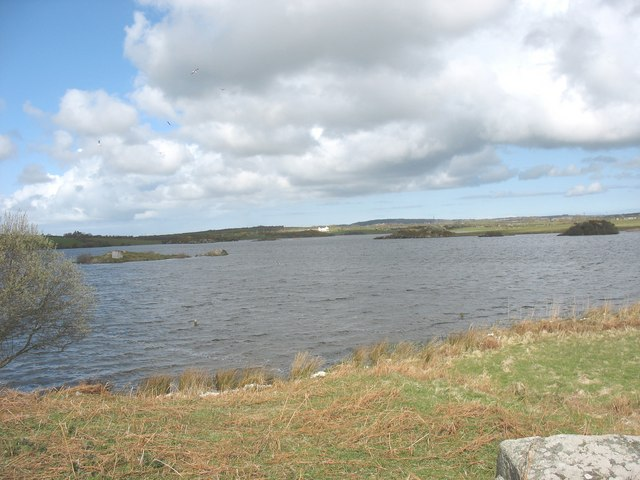
The lake in 2008

Llyn Traffwll is a 91 acre natural lake located, in Anglesey, Wales. Located midway between the villages of Rhosneigr and Valley it lies less than a kilometre south of the A55 North Wales Expressway. It is one of the largest natural lake on the island with Llyn Alaw and Llyn Cefni both being reservoirs. Along with the surrounding smaller lakes it is a Site of Special Scientific Interest and is adjacent to the Valley Wetlands RSPB site. Formerly (starting in 1866) the lake was used to supply water to Holyhead by the Holyhead Waterworks Company, and to aid water management a small dam was built which still exists.

In late 2019 it was reported that a 300 acre Photovoltaic power station called Parc Solar Traffwl was planned to be constructed near the lake. The Welsh language novel Madam Wen, Arwes yr Ogof, written by William David Owen, is set by the lake.
