= Farms Common =

Hamlet in Cornwall, England

Coordinates: 50.160°N 5.252°W

Farms Common: Cornish: Kemmyndir an Dre
- Location within Cornwall
- OS grid reference: SW678340
- Civil parish: Wendron
- Unitary authority: Cornwall
- Ceremonial county: Cornwall
- Region: South West
- Country: England
- Sovereign state: United Kingdom
- Post town: Helston
- Postcode district: TR13

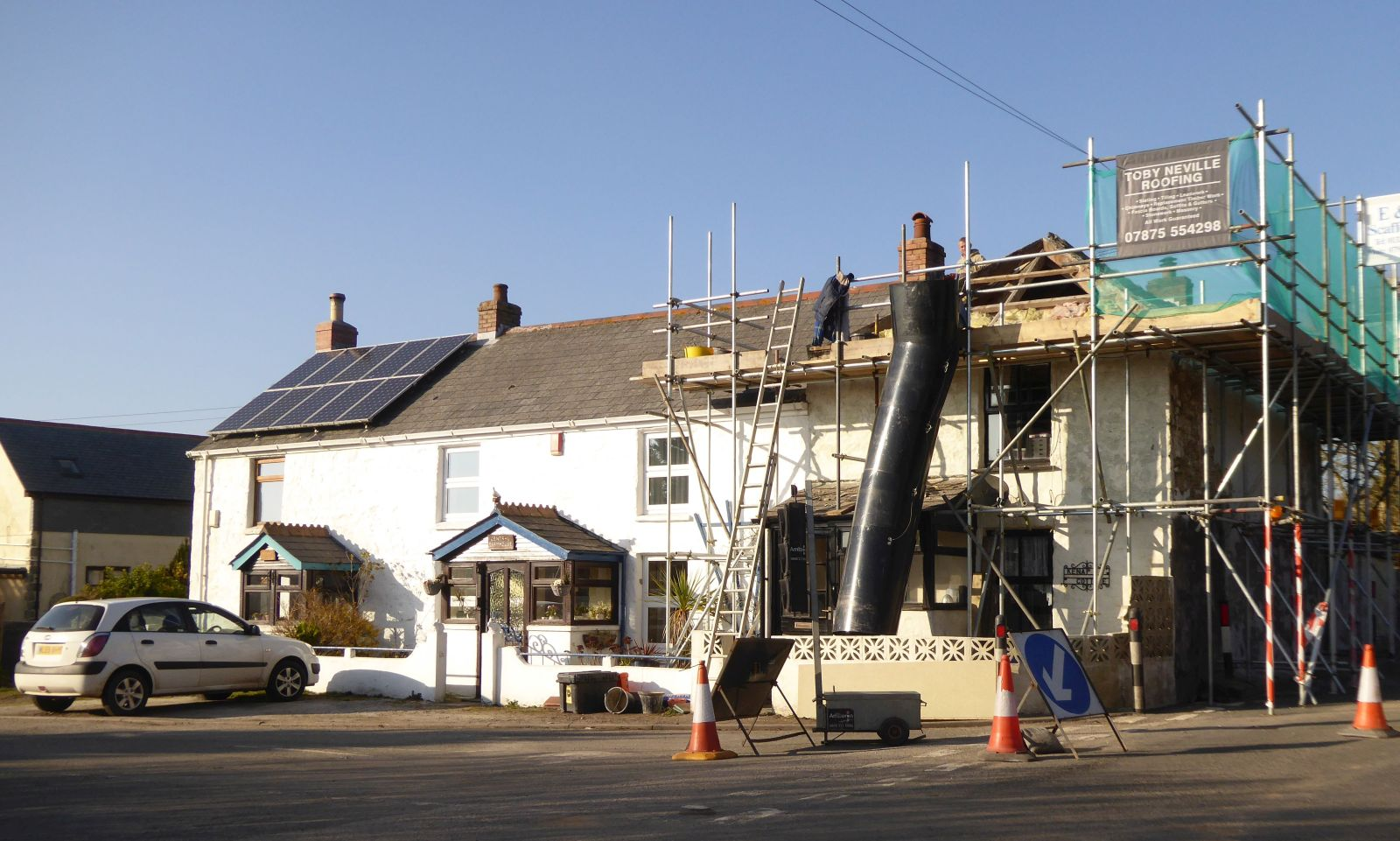

Farms Common (Cornish: Kemmyndir an Dre, meaning common land of the farm) is a hamlet in the parish of Wendron, Cornwall, England.
