= Tandinas =

Coordinates: 53.313309°N 4.122967°W

- Location within Anglesey
- OS grid reference: SH 5866 8170
  - Cardiff: 132.8 mi (213.7 km)
  - London: 209.5 mi (337.2 km)
- Community: Llanddona
- Principal area: Anglesey
- Country: Wales
- Sovereign state: United Kingdom
- Post town: Beaumaris
- Police: North Wales
- Fire: North Wales
- Ambulance: Welsh
- UK Parliament: Ynys Môn
- Senedd Cymru – Welsh Parliament: Bangor Conwy Môn

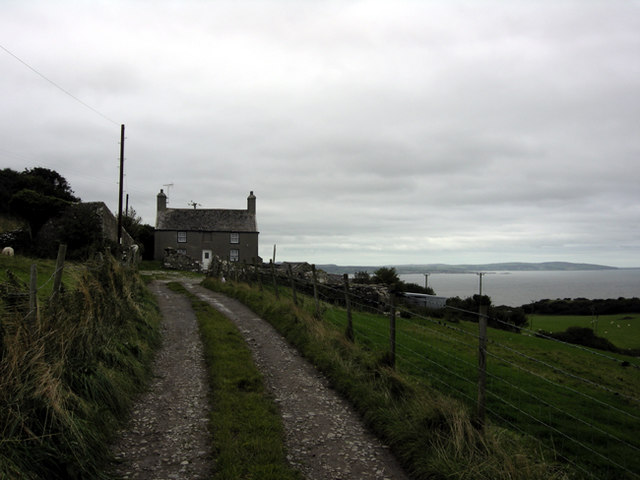
Tandinas Farm, looking across Traeth-coch from the lane near Tan Dinas Farmhouse c. 2011

Tandinas is a village in the community of Llanddona, Anglesey, Wales, which is 132.8 miles (213.7 km) from Cardiff and 209.5 miles (337.2 km) from London.

== See also ==
- List of localities in Wales by population
