= Fenton Pits =

Hamlet in Cornwall, England

Coordinates: 50.435°N 4.733°W

Fenton Pits: Cornish: Pyttow Fenten
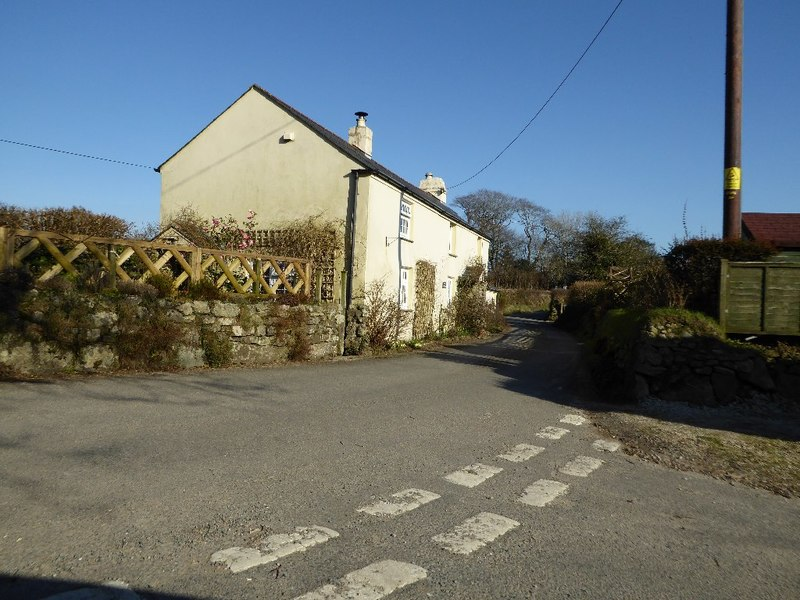

- Location within Cornwall
- OS grid reference: SX060630
- Civil parish: Lanivet
- Unitary authority: Cornwall
- Ceremonial county: Cornwall
- Region: South West
- Country: England
- Sovereign state: United Kingdom
- Post town: Bodmin
- Postcode district: PL30

Fenton Pits (Cornish: Pyttow Fenten, meaning spring/well pits) is a hamlet in the parish of Lanivet (where the 2011 census was included), Cornwall, England. It is located 2.5 miles south of the town of Bodmin, just off the A30.
