= Felin Wnda =

Village in Ceredigion, Wales

Coordinates: 52.095770°N 4.448497°W

- Country lane near Felin Wnda

- Location within Ceredigion
- OS grid reference: SN 3237 4699
  - Cardiff: 69 mi (111 km)
  - London: 189 mi (304 km)
- Community: Penbryn / Troedyraur
- Principal area: Ceredigion
- Country: Wales
- Sovereign state: United Kingdom
- Post town: Llandysul
- Postcode district: SA44
- Police: Dyfed-Powys
- Fire: Mid and West Wales
- Ambulance: Welsh
- UK Parliament: Ceredigion Preseli
- Senedd Cymru – Welsh Parliament: Ceredigion

Felin Wnda or Felinwnda is a hamlet on the border of the communities of Penbryn and Troedyraur, Ceredigion, Wales.

There is a chapel called Capel Gwnda. A farm also uses this name, and there is a nearby holy well called Ffynnon Capel Gwnda.

There is a corn mill named Felin Wnda.

== See also ==
- List of localities in Wales by population
