= Clegir Mawr =

Protected area in Anglesey, Wales

- Site of Special Scientific Interest
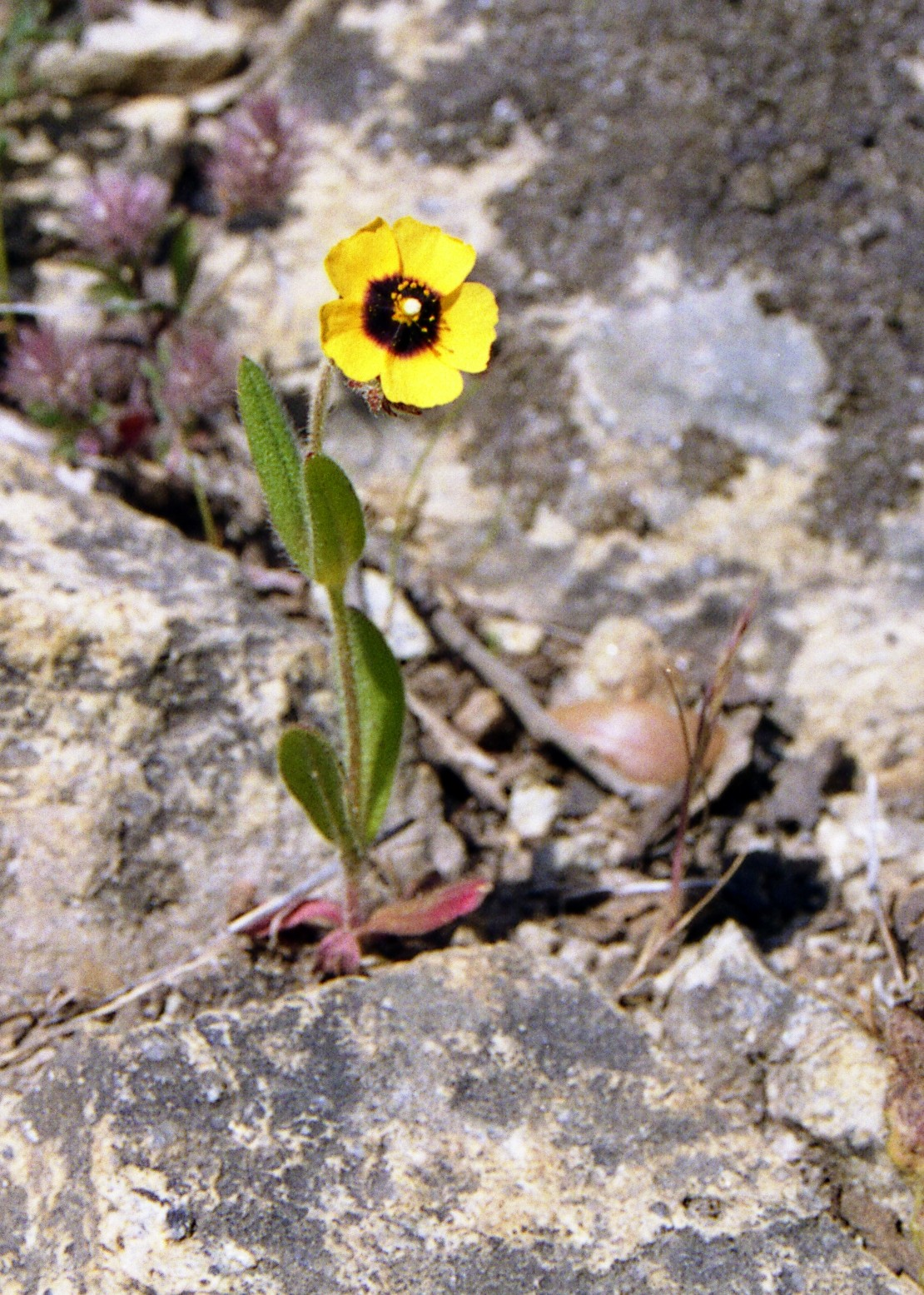
- The spotted rock-rose

- Location within Anglesey
- Location of Clegir Mawr.
- Area of search: West Gwynedd
- Grid reference: SH 299 900
- Coordinates: 53.3799°N 4.5580°W
- Interest: Biological
- Area: 9.6 hectares (24 acres)
- Notification date: 1961

Clegir Mawr is a Site of Special Scientific Interest (SSSI) in the community of Cylch-y-Garn in the north-west of the island of Anglesey, Wales. It is a stony coastal headland with an area just under 10 hectares (25 acres) and has been designated principally because of the occurrence of the spotted rock-rose (Tuberaria guttata) which is a nationally rare plant and also the county flower of Anglesey.

== Site ==
The site includes two areas north of Church Bay (Porth Mawr) and includes coastal heath, coastal grassland, sea cliffs and scrub habitats with a total area of 9.6 hectares (24 acres). Much of the area around the site is owned by the National Trust and includes the Isle of Anglesey Coastal Path.

== Importance ==
The principal feature is the spotted rock-rose which favours thin acidic soils on rocky ridgelines or steep slopes. The spotted rock-rose is only known to exist in nine British locations. One location is on the Lleyn Peninsula and the remaining seven are on Holy Island, Anglesey. The flower blooms from June to August and the blooms last only a day. The flower is the county flower of Anglesey.

The conditions for the spotted rock-rose are also support a number of other species including sheep's fescue (Festuca ovina), common bent (Agrostis capillaris), squirreltail fescue (Vulpia bromoides), early hair-grass (Aira praecox), heather (Calluna vulgaris), bell heather (Erica cinerea), western gorse (Ulex gallii), spring squill (Scilla verna) and English stonecrop (Sedum anglicum).

The uncommon golden-samphire (Inula crithmoides) is found on the sea cliffs, and the prickly sedge (Carex muricata) and dodder (Cuscuta epithymum) are also found on the site.
