= Cors Bodeilio National Nature Reserve =

Protected area in Anglesey, Wales

Coordinates: 53.2704°N 4.2530°W

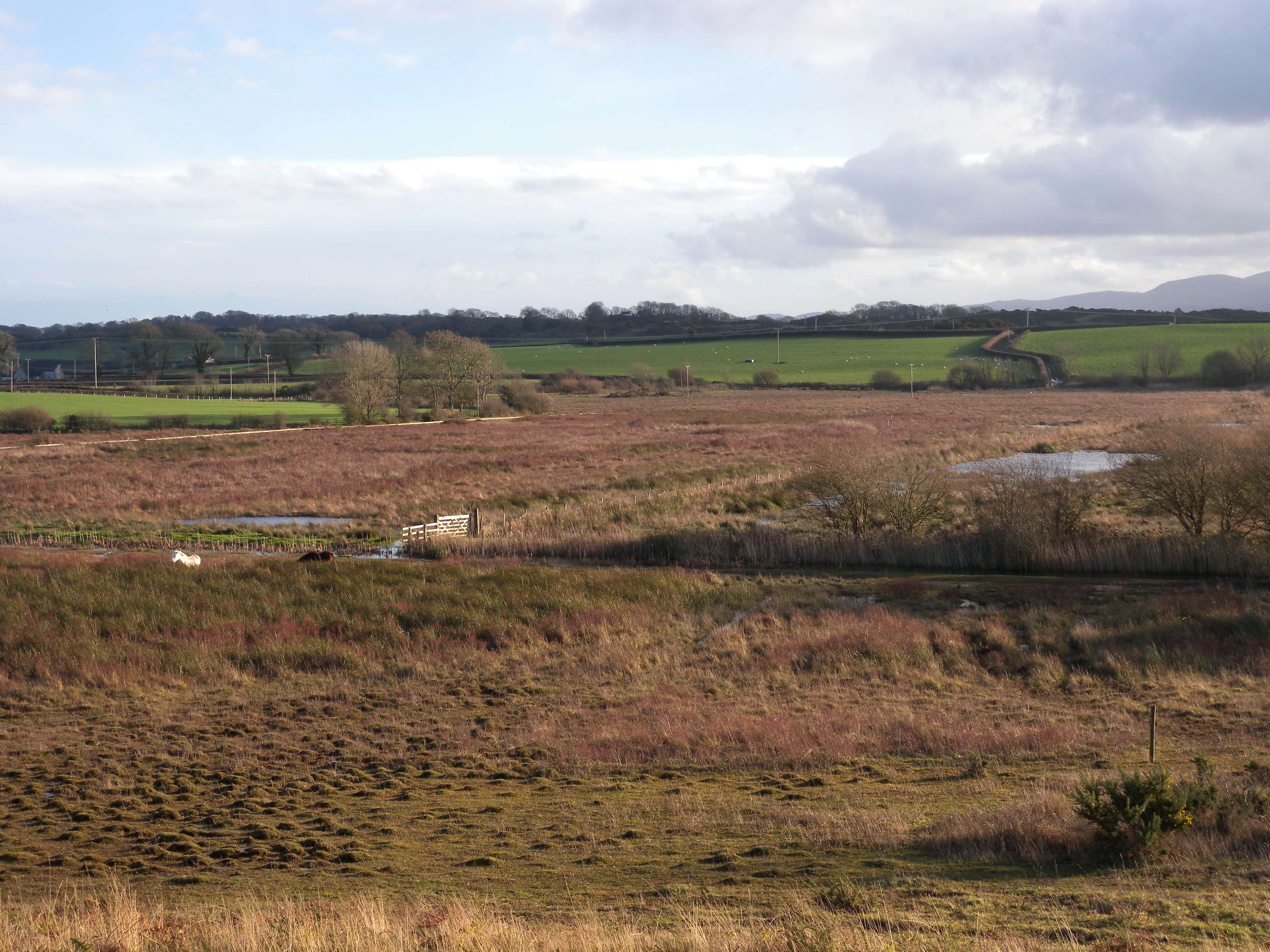
A view across Cors Bodeilio, Anglesey, Wales

Cors Bodeilio National Nature Reserve lies in a shallow valley outside Talwrn on the Isle of Anglesey. Most of the land consists of a lime-rich mire. This type of wetland is rare, giving the reserve national importance. It is host to a large range of plants and animals, including the medicinal leech.

A number of nationally local or rare species of plant have been recorded from the site including fen pondweed, several species of stonewort including the rare dwarf stonewort, olive earthtongue fungus (Microglossum olivaceum), fen pondweed, narrow-leaved marsh orchid and fly orchid

The nature reserve is within a designated Site of Special Scientific Interest, is also a Ramsar site and is also a special area of conservation (SAC).
