= Farthingloe =

Village in Kent, England

Coordinates: 51.1173°N 1.2777°E

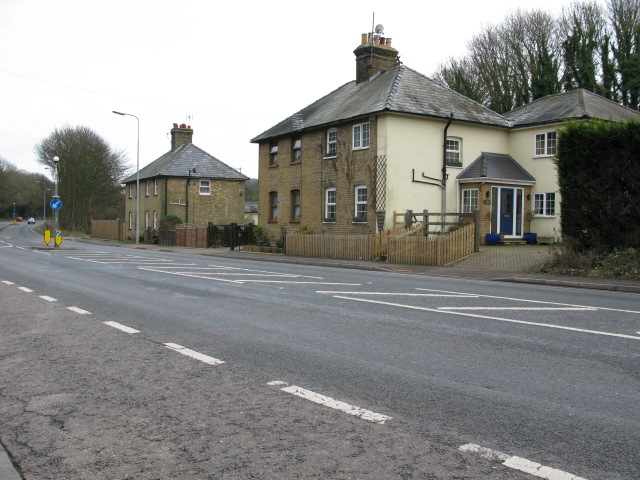
- Cottages on Folkestone Road

- Location within Kent
- District: Dover
- Shire county: Kent
- Region: South East
- Country: England
- Sovereign state: United Kingdom
- Post town: Dover
- Postcode district: CT15 7
- Police: Kent
- Fire: Kent
- Ambulance: South East Coast

Farthingloe is a village west of Dover in southeast England.
