= Valley Wetlands =

RSPB nature reserve in Anglesey, UK

Coordinates: 53.262°N 4.525°W

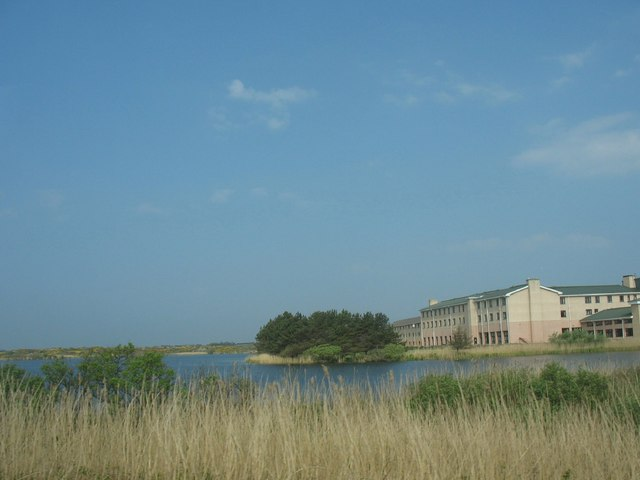
Llyn Penrhyn

Valley Wetlands (Welsh: Gwlyptiroedd y Fali), formerly Valley Lakes, is a nature reserve in Anglesey, Wales belonging to the Royal Society for the Protection of Birds. It is an area of lakes and reedbeds to the south-east of Valley in Llanfair-yn-Neubwll community, adjacent to RAF Valley airfield. The western section of the reserve includes Llyn Penrhyn, Llyn Treflesg and part of Llyn Dinam. The eastern part includes Llyn Traffwll and wetlands along the Afon Crigyll. Much of the reserve is included within two Sites of Special Scientific Interest.

Breeding birds include good numbers of sedge and reed warblers which have been joined in recent years by Cetti's warbler. Several species of duck breed including shoveler, gadwall and pochard. Outside the breeding season, duck numbers increase and bittern and marsh harrier are regularly seen. Several rare birds have been recorded such as whiskered tern, green-winged teal and ring-necked duck.

The reserve is rich in wetland plants with large areas of reed and willow and uncommon species such as eight-stamened waterwort, flowering rush, marsh fern and hop sedge. Among the insects are hairy dragonfly, variable damselfly and various water beetles. Mammals include otter and water vole.
