= Feriniquarrie =

Coordinates: 57.45409°N 6.70423°W

Feriniquarrie: Scottish Gaelic: Fearann MhicGuaire
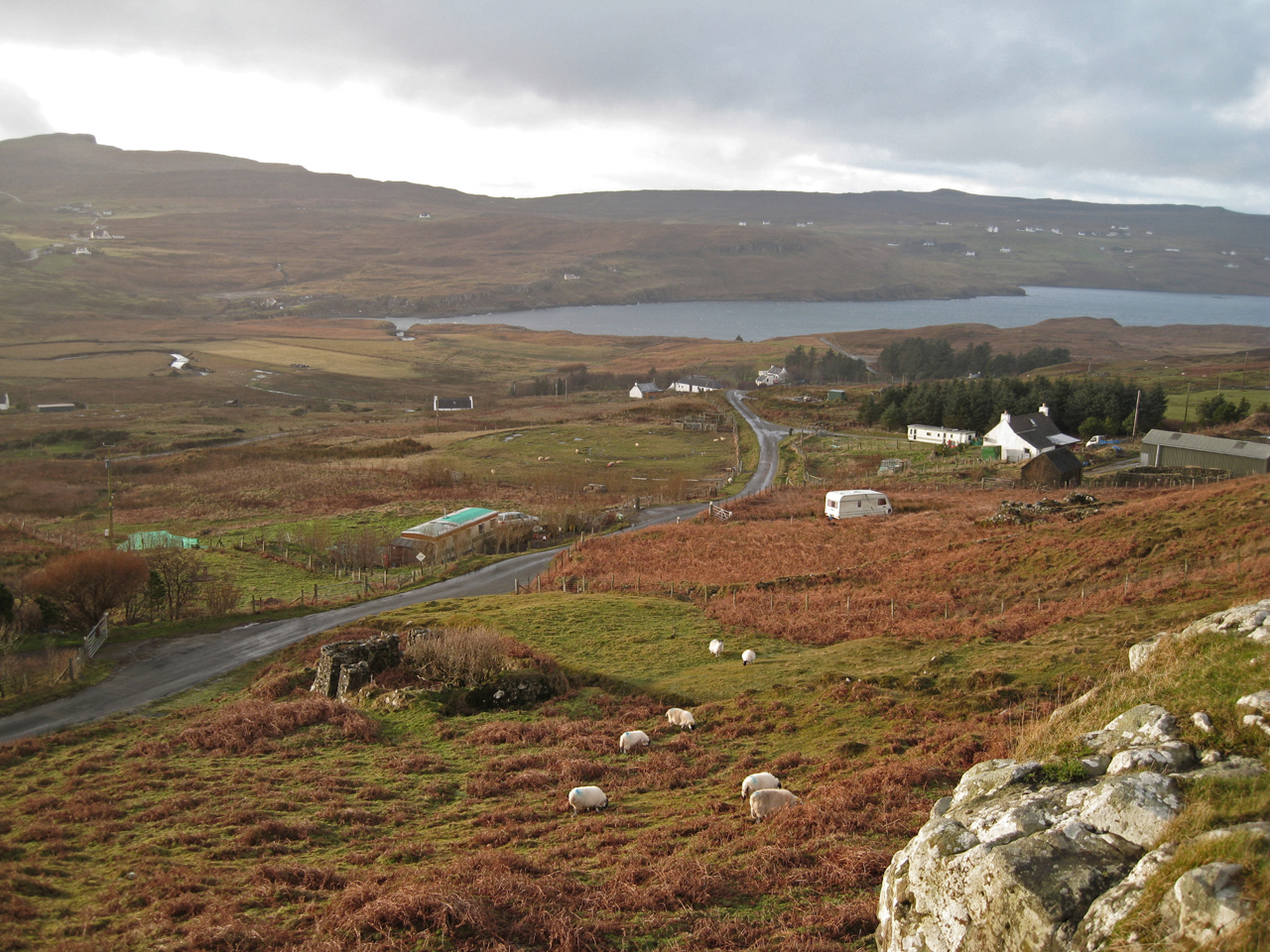

- Location within the Isle of Skye
- OS grid reference: NG179501
- Council area: Highland
- Country: Scotland
- Sovereign state: United Kingdom
- Postcode district: IV55 8
- Dialling code: 01470
- Police: Scotland
- Fire: Scottish
- Ambulance: Scottish

Feriniquarrie (Scottish Gaelic: Fearann MhicGuaire) is a remote scattered crofting township, situated close to Glendale, on the Duirinish peninsula, in Isle of Skye, Scottish Highlands and is in the Scottish council area of Highland.

The crofting township of Glasphein lies directly to the southeast.
