= Arfordir Gogleddol Penmon =

Protected area in Anglesey, Wales

- Site of Special Scientific Interest
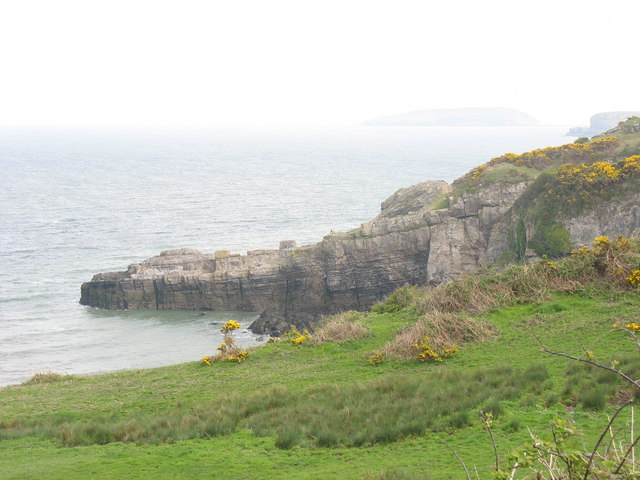
- Pen-y-chwarel - quarry top.

- Location within Anglesey
- Location of Arfordir Gogleddol Penmon.
- Area of search: West Gwynedd
- Grid reference: SH5777781729
- Coordinates: 53.313339°N 4.1362667°W
- Interest: Biological
- Area: 103.33 ha (255.3 acres)
- Notification date: 1953

Arfordir Gogleddol Penmon is a site of special scientific interest (SSSI) on the island of Anglesey, Wales, comprising about 103Ha of land along some 7 km of coastline at the south-east tip of the island.

The site was designated in 2003 for a range of interests including botany, ornithology, geology and its marine environment.

The geological interest is largely centred on the disused Tandinas quarry which provides the type locality for the Tandinas formation of the carboniferous limestone. There are very good exposures in the quarry and on the sea cliffs.

The underlying limestone supports both calcareous dry heath and wet heath biological communities and includes a thriving population of Platanthera bifolia.

The shoreline is exposed to moderate degrees of wave exposure and is one of the better examples of marine communities of such limestone shores in the area.

This site is within the Anglesey Area of Outstanding Natural Beauty (AONB).
