= Mariandyrys =

Coordinates: 53.30877°N 4.095618°W

- Location within Anglesey
- OS grid reference: SH 6047 8114
  - Cardiff: 132.2 mi (212.8 km)
  - London: 208.5 mi (335.5 km)
- Community: Llangoed
- Principal area: Anglesey
- Country: Wales
- Sovereign state: United Kingdom
- Post town: Beaumaris
- Police: North Wales
- Fire: North Wales
- Ambulance: Welsh
- UK Parliament: Ynys Môn
- Senedd Cymru – Welsh Parliament: Ynys Môn

Mariandyrys is a village in the community of Llangoed, Anglesey, Wales, which is 132.2 miles (212.7 km) from Cardiff and 208.5 miles (335.4 km) from London.

Within the community and to the west of the village centre is an SSSI which is also a Nature Reserve managed by North Wales Wildlife Trust. It comprises an area of limestone grassland and heath with views to Snowdonia and the coast of Anglesey.

== See also ==
- List of localities in Wales by population
