= St Oswald's Church, Farnham =

Church in Farnham, North Yorkshire, England

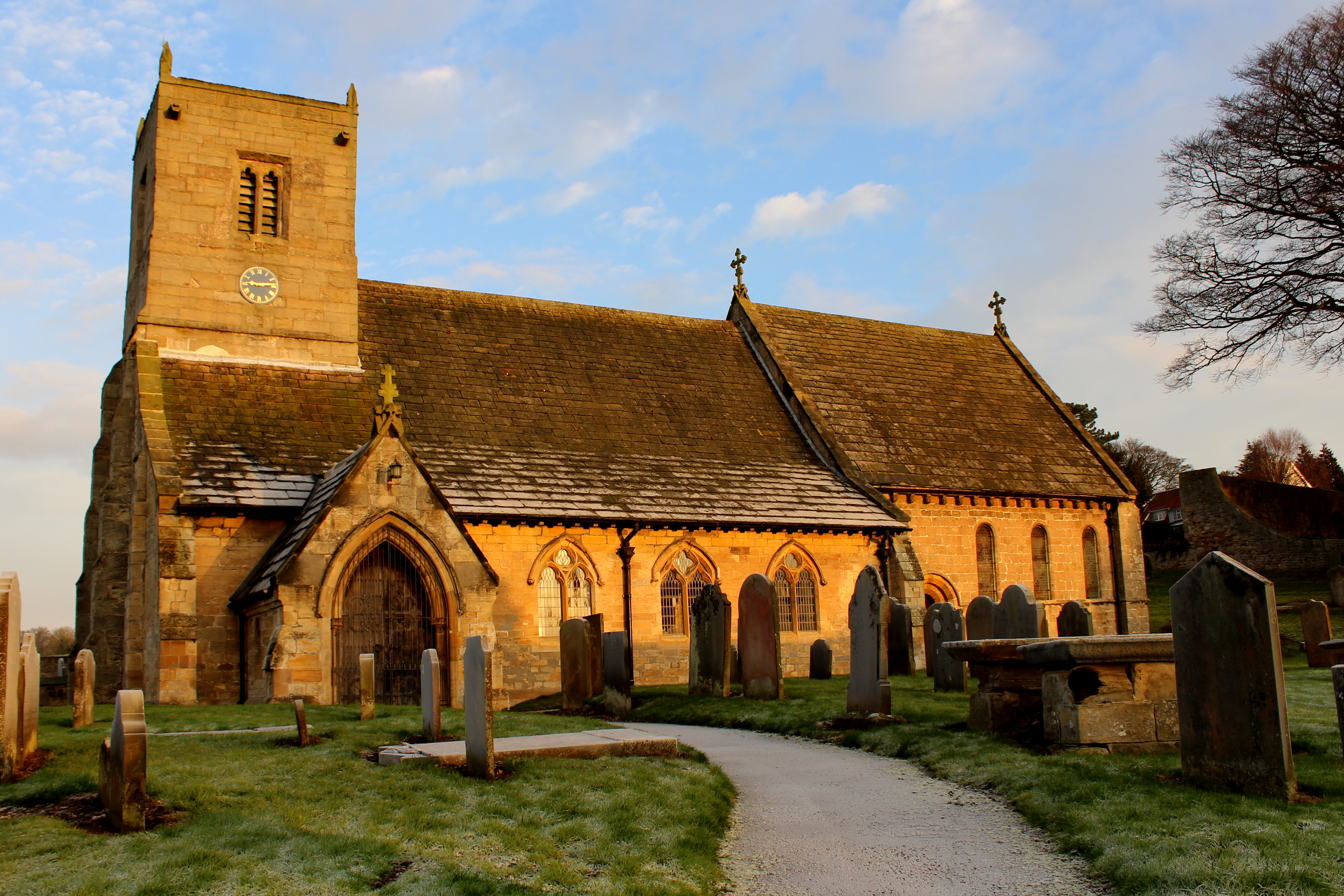
The church, in 2014

St Oswald's Church is the parish church of Farnham, North Yorkshire, a village in England.

The church was originally built in the 12th century, from which period much of the chancel survives. Nave aisles were added in the 13th and 14th centuries, and the tower dates from about 1500, when the nave was extended one bay further west. In 1854, the church was restored by George Gilbert Scott, whose work included a porch and new nave windows. The church was grade I listed in 1966. Its chancel was described by Nikolaus Pevsner as "beautiful". The church's original dedication is unknown, but it was dedicated to Saint Oswald of Worcester in recent times.

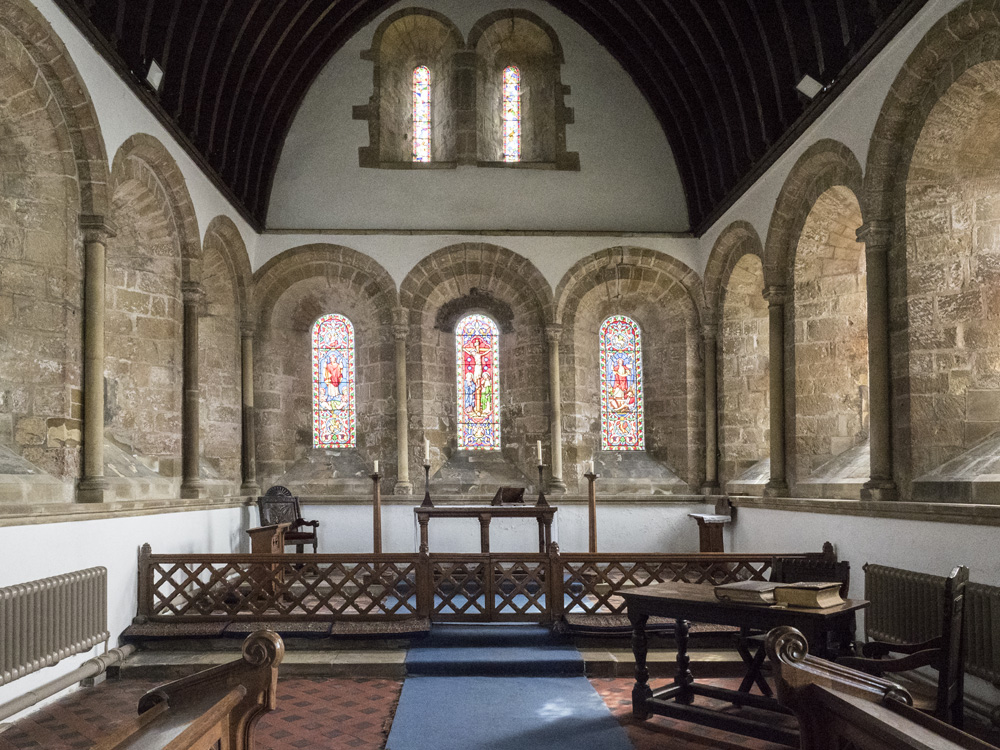
The chancel

The church is built of limestone and gritstone and has a stone slate roof. It consists of a nave, north and south aisles, a south porch, a chancel, and a west tower embraced by the aisles. The tower has two-light bell openings, a clock face on the south side, and a plain parapet with stone spouts and corner pinnacles. The chancel contains Norman round-arched windows, the nave windows are Gothic, and the west window has three lights and a Tudor arch. Inside the church, there are memorials to the Slingsby family of Scriven Park.

== See also ==
- Grade I listed buildings in North Yorkshire (district)
- Listed buildings in Farnham, North Yorkshire
