= Cae Gwyn SSSI =

Protected area in Anglesey, Wales

Cae Gwyn
- Site of Special Scientific Interest
- Location within Wales
- Location of Cae Gwyn.
- Area of search: West Gwynedd
- Grid reference: SH3465891810
- Coordinates: 53.397152°N 4.4882269°W
- Interest: Biological
- Area: 10.16 ha (25.1 acres)
- Notification date: 1980

Cae Gwyn Site of Special Scientific Interest is a small heath and ponds at the northern end of the Isle of Anglesey.

The site has two distinct pond areas separated by a heathy ridge and is particularly notable for the abundance of royal fern Osmunda regalis, bog sedge Carex limosa and especially for the populations of locally uncommon cranberry Vaccinium oxycoccos growing on a Sphagnum lawn in one of the ponds.
