= Cors Erddreiniog National Nature Reserve =

Protected area in Anglesey, Wales

Coordinates: 53.3072°N 4.2953°W

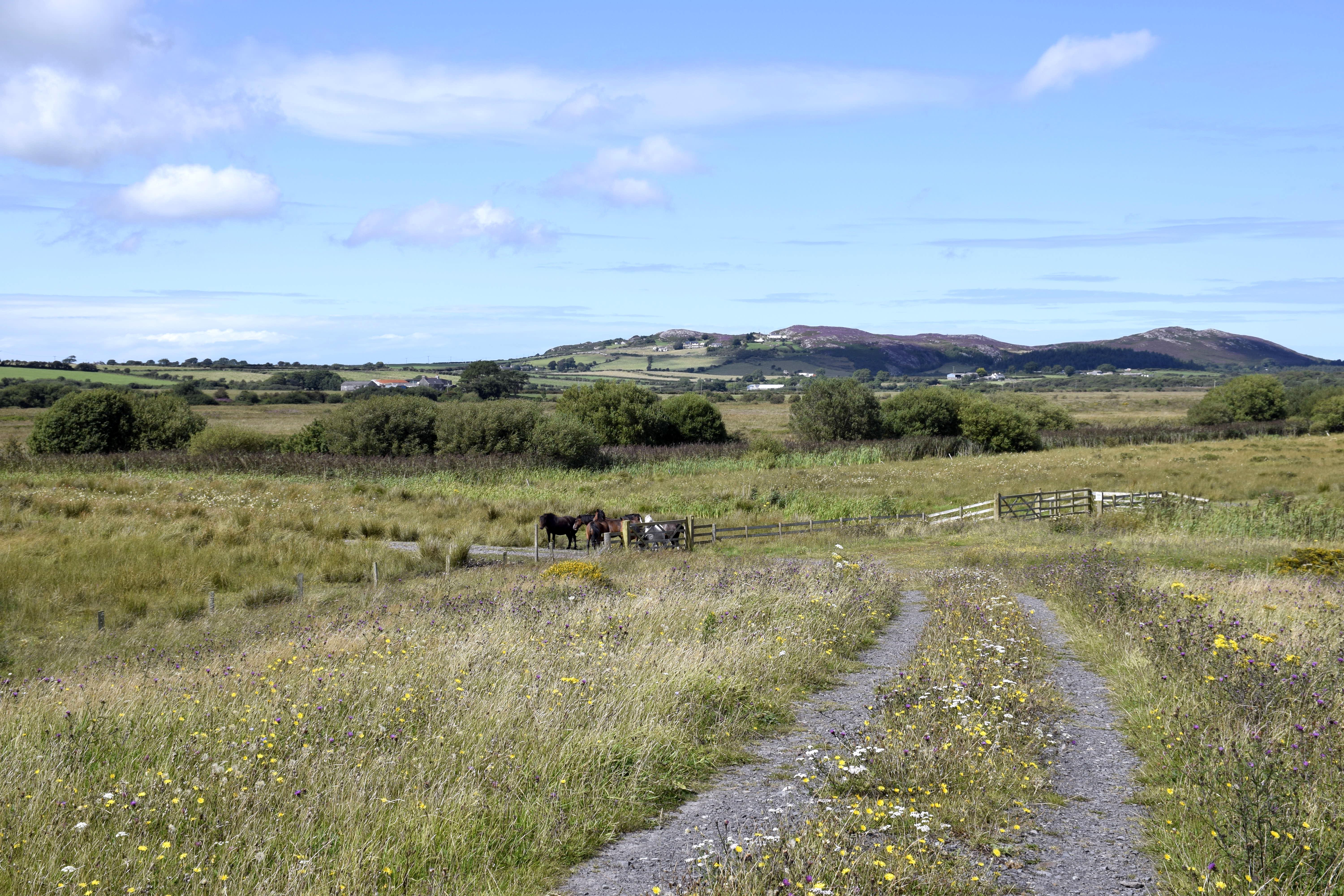
A view across Cors Erddreniog, Anglesey, Wales

Cors Erddreiniog National Nature Reserve is the largest of the Anglesey fens and was described by the former Countryside Council for Wales as the "Jewel in the crown of the Anglesey fens"

The site is a designated SSSI

Located close to the village of Capel Coch and only 5 kilometres west of Benllech on the northeast side of the island, its varied terrain gives rise to large areas of reed bed, woodland and small lakes.

A total of 15 different types of dragonfly and damselfly have been recorded in the reserve, and at dusk barn owls can be spotted hunting.
