= Farnham, North Yorkshire =

Village and civil parish in North Yorkshire, England

Coordinates: 54.039370°N 1.465040°W

Farnham
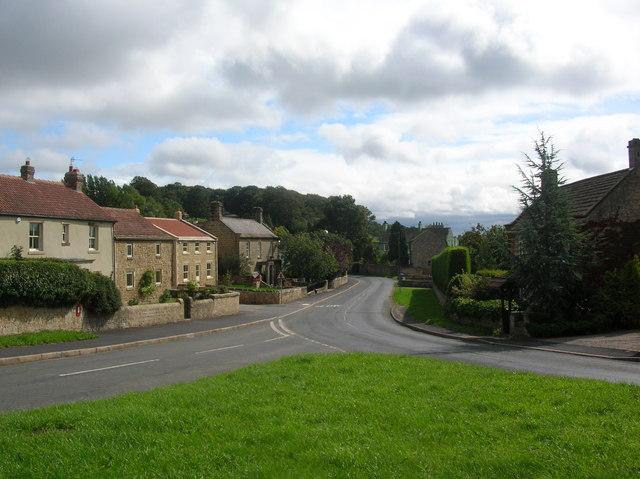
- Farnham from the village green

- Location within North Yorkshire
- Population: 189 (2011 census)
- OS grid reference: SE351605
- Civil parish: Farnham
- Unitary authority: North Yorkshire
- Ceremonial county: North Yorkshire
- Region: Yorkshire and the Humber
- Country: England
- Sovereign state: United Kingdom
- Post town: KNARESBOROUGH
- Postcode district: HG5
- Police: North Yorkshire
- Fire: North Yorkshire
- Ambulance: Yorkshire
- UK Parliament: Harrogate and Knaresborough

Farnham is a village and civil parish in the county of North Yorkshire, England. It is situated 2 miles (3.2 km) north of Knaresborough.

== History ==
The village is mentioned in the Domesday Book as having one household and 26 ploughlands. The name derives from the Old English of Feran-hām, meaning the homestead where the ferns grew. St Oswald's Church, Farnham, the Anglican church, dates back to the 12th century and is grade I listed.

Farnham Gravel Pits were worked between 1941 and 1985. The pits later filled with water and cover an area of 200 acres (81 ha). The pits hosted Britain's first Pacific diver in January and February 2007.

The Knaresborough Hoard of Roman vessels found in 1864 was probably discovered near Farnham.

Farnham is the location of a large factory, Treves UK which makes automotive components. Farnham is served by five buses each way per day between Knaresborough and York.

== Governance ==
Historically, the village was in the wapentake of Claro, in the West Riding of Yorkshire. It was moved into North Yorkshire in 1974 and was part of the Harrogate District until 2023, it is now administered by the unitary North Yorkshire Council.

Population of Farnham 1801–2015
1801	1811	1821	1831	1841	1851	1861	1871	1881	1891	1901	1911	1921	1931	1951	1961	2011	2015
139	142	141	169	170	139	165	146	155	118	129	139	138	106	107	106	189	180 (Note: Estimated population.)

== See also ==
- Listed buildings in Farnham, North Yorkshire
- Farnham Mires
