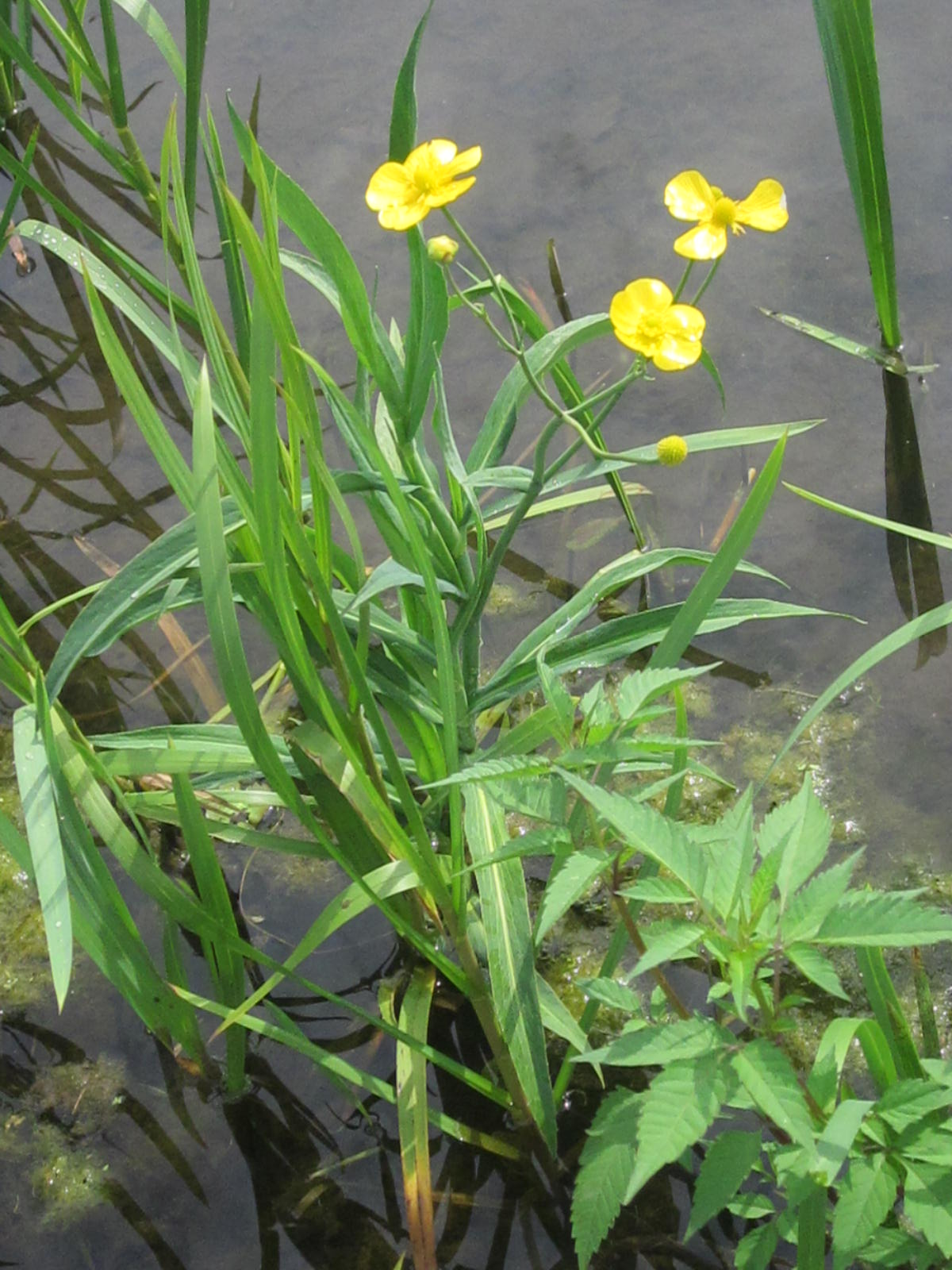

Conservation status
- Least Concern (IUCN 3.1)

Scientific classification
- Kingdom: Plantae
- Clade: Tracheophytes
- Clade: Angiosperms
- Clade: Eudicots
- Order: Ranunculales
- Family: Ranunculaceae
- Genus: Ranunculus
- Species: R. lingua

Binomial name
- Ranunculus lingua L.

Synonyms
- Flammula lingua Fourr.

= Ranunculus lingua =

Species of flowering plant

Ranunculus lingua, the greater spearwort, great spearwort, tongue-leaved crowfoot, or water buttercup, is a plant species in the family Ranunculaceae native to temperate areas of Europe, Siberia and through to the western Himalayas. It is a semiaquatic plant that prefers to grow in about 40 cm (16 in) of water in a variety of wetland habitats. A cultivar (or perhaps a traditional variety) called 'Grandiflorus', the large-flowered greater spearwort, has 6 cm (2 in) flowers and is favored by gardeners.

== Description ==
Greater spearwort is a stoloniferous perennial plant with stems up to about 120 cm (47 in) long, which can start horizontal in mud but then become erect and hollow as they rise out of the water. The aerial stems are sometime branched and often slightly hairy, with short, eglandular, appressed hairs. The branches and upper stem bear alternate leaves on short petioles, which are up to 30 cm (12 in) long by 3 cm (1.2 in) wide, with a narrow tip. In the autumn, shorter submerged basal leaves are produced, which typically overwinter. All the leaves are generally glabrous and entire, although some may be slightly toothed towards the apex.

Flowering occurs in the summer months (June-September in northern Europe), with the inflorescence a cyme of large (up to 5 cm) 5-petalled yellow flowers arranged individually on long pedicels. The flowers are hermaphroditic, with numerous stamens surrounding a glabrous receptacle on which are there are also many carpels. The fruits are obovoid achenes up to 2.7 mm long with a minutely pitted surface.

== Distribution and status ==
The native range of greater spearwort is throughout Europe and western Asia as far western Siberia and Xinjiang province of China. Populations are judged to be stable, globally, and its threat status is LC (Least Concern).

The situation is Britain is a bit more complex. It is thought to be declining as a native wild plant of various types of wetland, but it has been widely planted into garden ponds and wild areas since the 1950s. These introductions have more than compensated for the losses in terms of distribution, but may mask some environmental degradation. Its overall status remains LC, however.

== Habitat and ecology ==
Greater spearwort occurs in a wide variety of wetland habitats, including marshes, ditches, ponds, canals, reservoirs, gravel pits and quarries. In the British National Vegetation Classification it is listed in six swamp and one aquatic vegetation types; the aquatic one being A4, which is rare and restricted to The Broads of East Anglia.
