= Fairlie (surname) =

- Current region: Scotland, Canada, Ireland, Australia, New Zealand
- Earlier spellings: Fairlie, Fairley, Fairly, Fairle, Ffairle, Farnly, Ferneley, Ferly
- Etymology: Irish; Gaelic; Old Scots; Brythonic; Old English
- Origin: Scotland
- Distinctions: William Fairlie was a charter beneficiary, receiving Inverleith, by King Robert I of Scotland (abt. 1314)

Fairlie is a Scottish surname, widely presumed to derive from the village of Fairlie in North Ayrshire, Scotland.

== History ==
The family name emerges in several different locations in Scotland: Fairlie in Ayrshire, Braid in Midlothian (now within the City of Edinburgh), and within the ancient thanedom of Falkland.

== Etymology ==
The name originates in regions that were anciently populated by Gaelic and Cumbric-speakers. There is known to be a series of Brittonic kingdoms that stretched from modern Wales, through the west coast of England (Cumberland), through to the southern regions of modern Scotland (Lothian). These kingdoms would have shared some cultural traits like languages

=== Definition in Scots ===
The old Scots definition of a fairlie or ferly is:

- 'A marvellous thing; a wonder'.

=== Possible origins in Gaelic ===
There are many possible origins of the surname, with fear/fir being a common denomination for a tribe of people and lí/leigh/laigh/laois/liath being commonly found in place and people names throughout Ireland, Scotland, and England.

Other possible origins of the name:

- There was a medieval tribe located in present-day County Londonderry called the Fir Lí ("People of Poem/Song/Lustre/Brightness") who may have given their name to the Ayrshire town Fairlie.
- There is a cryptid in Scotland known by the name Am Fear Liath ('the grey man') who haunts Ben Macdui in the Cairngorms.
- There is a Gaelic name Forbhlaith which is commonly anglicized as Fervelith, Ferelith, or Fernelith.

=== Possible origins in Cumbric ===
There is a similar word in Cumbric and Welsh, fferllys/fferyl, relating to a region of Elfael in Wales and/or pseudo-mythical figures meaning either:

- Chemist, Virgil.
- Craftsman/metallurgist.

=== Proposed origins in Old English ===
It is commonly speculated that the Scottish name Fairlie and its variety of spellings originates from an old or middle-English term, though this does little to explain its antiquity in Scotland. The phrase meaning some version of:

- Beautiful meadow.
- Far field.
- Fern-covered field/meadow.
- Sheep field.
- Boar field.
- Bull field.

== Notable people ==
- Fairlie-Cuninghame baronets
- Andrew Fairlie (actor), Scottish actor
- Andrew Fairlie (chef), Scottish chef
- Brian Fairlie (born 1948), retired tennis player from New Zealand
- Charles Fairlie Dobbs (1872–1936), British Indian Army officer
- Gerard Fairlie (1899–1983), Scottish author and scriptwriter
- Henry Fairlie (1924–1990), British political journalist and social critic
- Jamie Fairlie (born 2 August 1957), former Scottish footballer
- Jim Fairlie (born 1940), Scottish politician and financial analyst
- John Archibald Fairlie (1872–1947), Scottish political scientist
- Kristin Fairlie (born 1985), Canadian actress
- Margaret Fairlie (1891–1963), Scottish academic and gynaecologist
- Peter Fairlie (born 1957), Scottish squash player
- Reginald Fairlie (1883–1952), Scottish architect
- Robert Francis Fairlie (born 1830/1831), Scottish railway engineer

== See also ==
- Fairley
- Farley
