= Fairly =

Fairly is a surname. Notable people with the name include:

- Caleb Fairly (born 1987), American road racing cyclist
- Ron Fairly (1938–2019), American baseball player and broadcaster

== See also ==
- Fairley, surname
- Fairlie (surname)
