= Fairley =

Fairley is a Scottish surname. It is an alternative spelling of the Scottish surname Fairlie.

Notable people with the name include:

- Barker Fairley (1887–1986), British-Canadian painter and writer
- Brian Fairley (b. 1959), Scottish football manager
- Darlene Fairley (b. 1943), Washington State senator
- Fiona Hamilton Fairley (b. 1963), English philanthropist
- Gordon Hamilton Fairley (1930–1975), Australian doctor
- Lois Ann Fairley (1931–2007), Canadian nurse and labour leader
- John Fairley, Lord Fairley, Scottish nobleman
- Ian Fairley (b. 1964), former Australian rules footballer
- Leonard Fairley (born 1951), American football player
- Margaret Fairley (1885–1968), Canadian writer
- Michelle Fairley, Northern Irish actress
- Sir Neil Hamilton Fairley (1891–1966), Australian soldier
- Nick Fairley (b. 1988), American football player
- Peter Fairley (1930–1998), British science journalist
- Sam Fairley (b. 1980), New Zealand cricketer

== See also ==
- Fairlie (surname)
- Farley (name)
