= The Cumbraes =

Group of islands in the Firth of Clyde, Scotland

Coordinates: 55°46′5″N 4°55′13″W

The Cumbraes are a group of islands in the Firth of Clyde, Scotland. The islands belong to the traditional county of Bute and the modern unitary authority of North Ayrshire.

The main islands in the group are:

- Great Cumbrae
- Little Cumbrae

These two islands are separated from each other by a broad sound called The Tan and from the Scottish mainland by a busy shipping channel known as the Fairlie Roads.

There are also a number of uninhabited islets in the group:

- The Eileans
- Castle Island
- The Broad Islands
- Trail Isle

The Cumbraes are referred to as the Kumreyiar in the Norse Saga of Haakon Haakonarson.

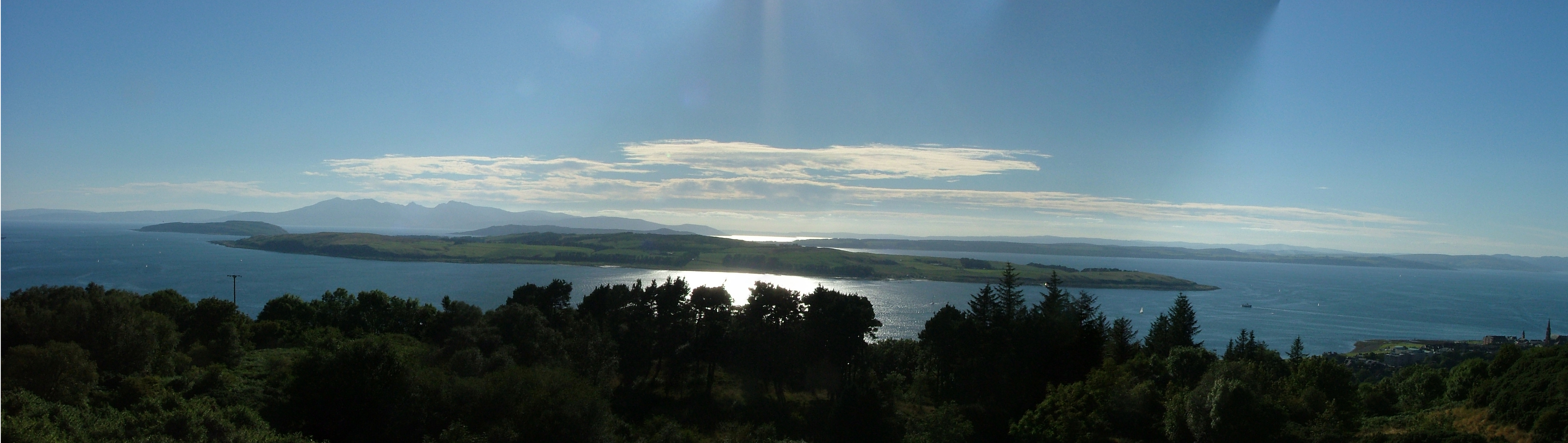
The Cumbraes seen from the Haylie Brae. Note Arran and Bute beyond.
