= Little Cumbrae =

Island in the Firth of Clyde sea inlet, western Scotland

Cumaradh Beag (Gaelic)
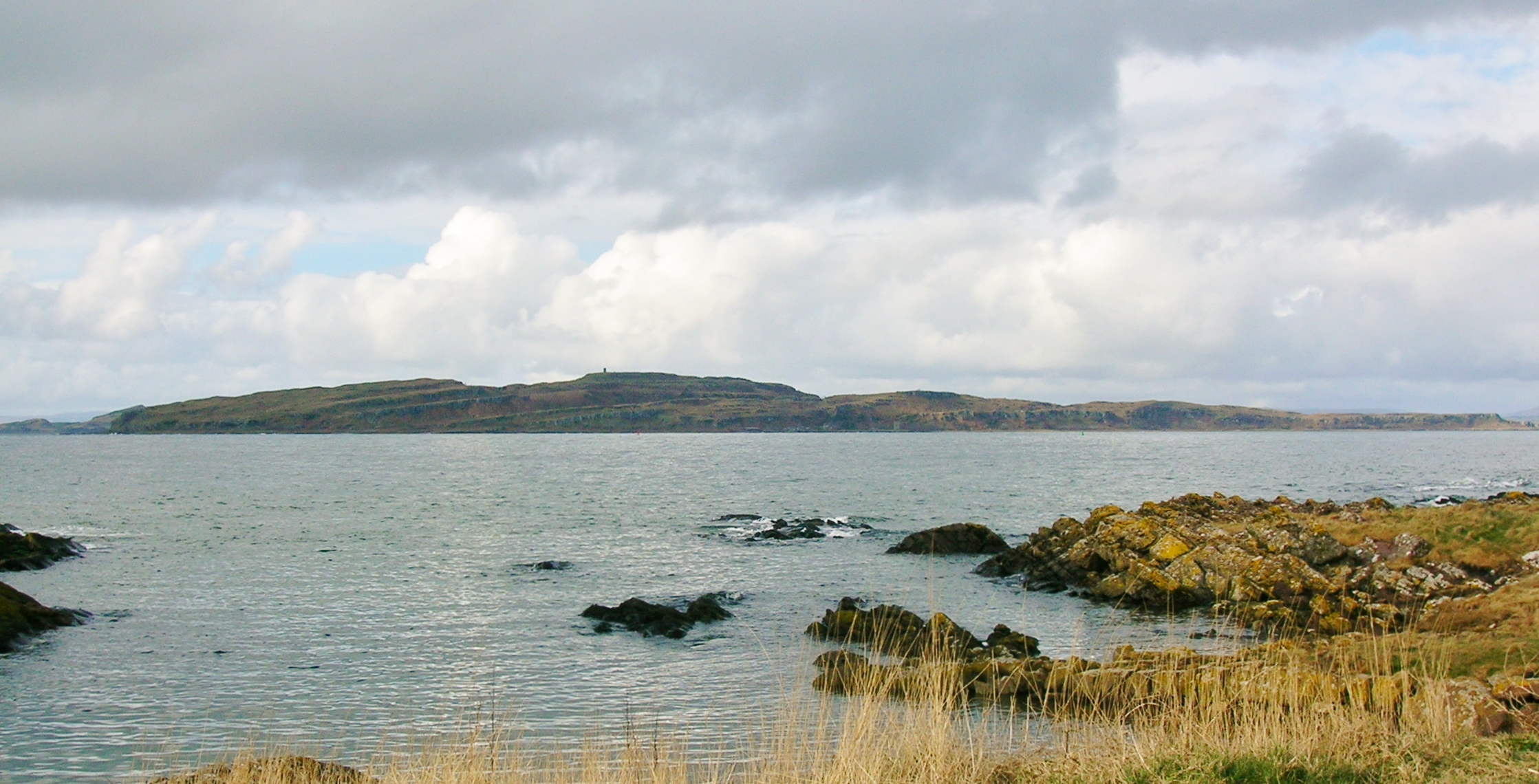
- Little Cumbrae Island from Portencross, Ayrshire

Location
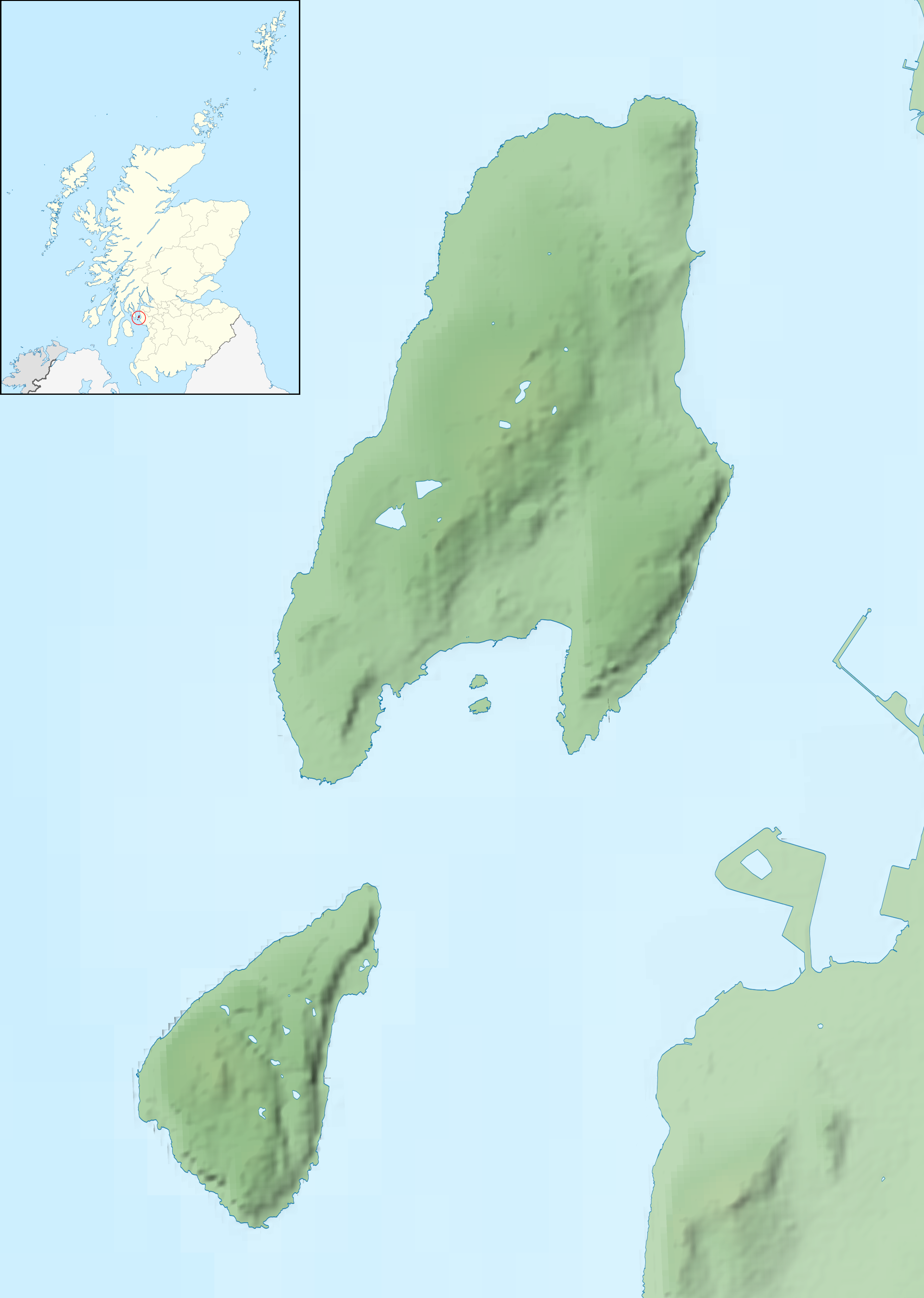
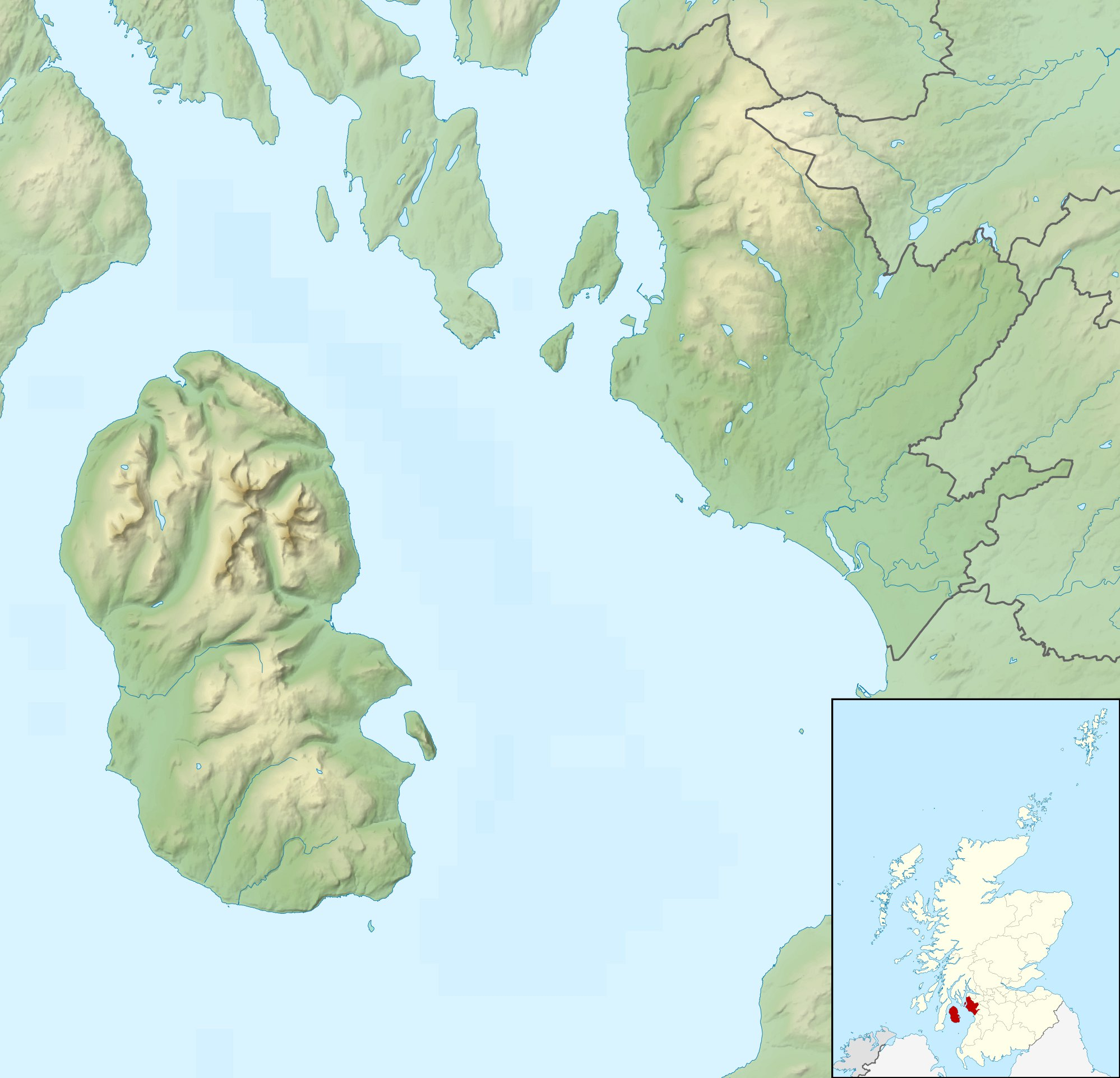
- Little Cumbrae shown next to Great Cumbrae Little Cumbrae shown within North Ayrshire
- OS grid reference: NS148517
- Coordinates: 55.72°N 4.95°W

Physical geography
- Island group: Islands of the Clyde
- Area: 313 hectares (1.21 sq mi)
- Area rank: 84
- Highest elevation: Lighthouse Hill 123 metres (404 ft)

Administration
- Council area: North Ayrshire
- Country: Scotland
- Sovereign state: United Kingdom

Demographics
- Population: 0

Little Cumbrae (Scottish Gaelic: Cumaradh Beag) is an island in the Firth of Clyde, in North Ayrshire, Scotland. It lies south of Great Cumbrae, its larger neighbour. The underlying geology is igneous with limited outcrops of sedimentary rock. Little Cumbrae House is of 20th century construction, although the island has no permanent inhabitation at present, its population having peaked at 23 in the late 19th century. There is a lighthouse on the western coast.

== Etymology ==
The Cumbraes take their name from the Old Norse Kumreyjar, meaning "islands of the Cymry" (referring to the Cumbric-speaking inhabitants of southern Scotland). They are referred to under this name in the Norse Saga of Haakon Haakonarson.

Little Cumbrae was recorded as "Litill Comeray" in 1515 and later in that century as "Cumbray of the Dais". (Note: Monro wrote that the name “Cumbray of the Dais” arose “because there is mony Dais in it”. This has been interpreted to mean that the derivation of “Dais” is from Scots: Dae, a female fallow deer. However Scottish Gaelic: deas means “south” and as Little Cumbrae is just 1 kilometre (0.62 mi) south of its larger neighbour and Monro’s grasp of Gaelic is known to have been weak it is possible that the name simply meant “South Cumbrae”.) In modern Gaelic these the island is known as Cumaradh Beag. In former times it was also known as Lesser or Wee Cumbrae.

== Geography ==
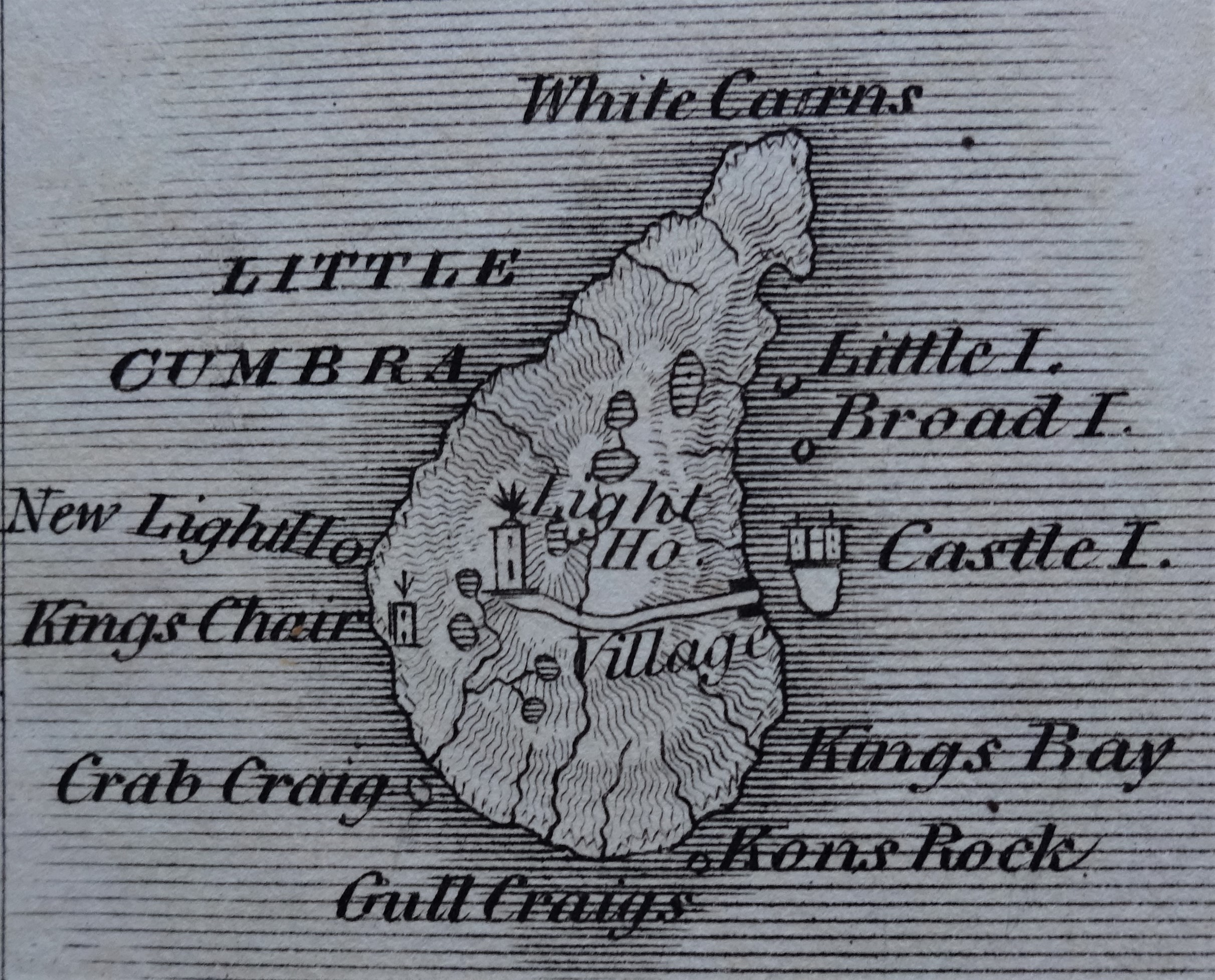
Little Cumbrae in 1828

Little Cumbrae lies barely a kilometre to the south of Great Cumbrae, a few kilometres distant from the mainland town of Largs. The islands are collectively referred to as The Cumbraes. In stark contrast to its neighbour, green and fertile Great Cumbrae, Little Cumbrae is a rough and rocky island. With its many cliffs and rocky outcrops, Little Cumbrae bears more of a resemblance to a Hebridean island than to some of its neighbours in the Clyde.

A number of uninhabited islets skirt the island's east coast, Castle Isle, the Broad Islands and Trail Isle.

Today the island's main settlement is at Little Cumbrae House on the eastern shore, facing the Scottish mainland.

== Geology ==
Unlike its larger neighbour, Little Cumbrae is formed almost entirely from extrusive igneous rocks. These are a mix of Carboniferous age basalts, mugearite and hawaiite lava flows cut by a similarly aged WSW-ENE aligned dyke of alkali olivine diorite. A later northwest–southeast aligned swarm of dykes of Palaeogene age intrude these rocks whilst several geological faults run generally NW-SE. There are limited outcrops of sedimentary rock in the east, these being of the Eileans Sandstone assigned to the Clyde Sandstone Formation of the Carboniferous age Inverclyde Group. A raised beach is developed along the lower-lying east coast of the island on which have accumulated marine deposits and blown sand. Glacial striations betray the broadly north–south movement of a glacier over the island during the last ice age. Small pockets of peat have accumulated during the post-glacial period.

== History ==
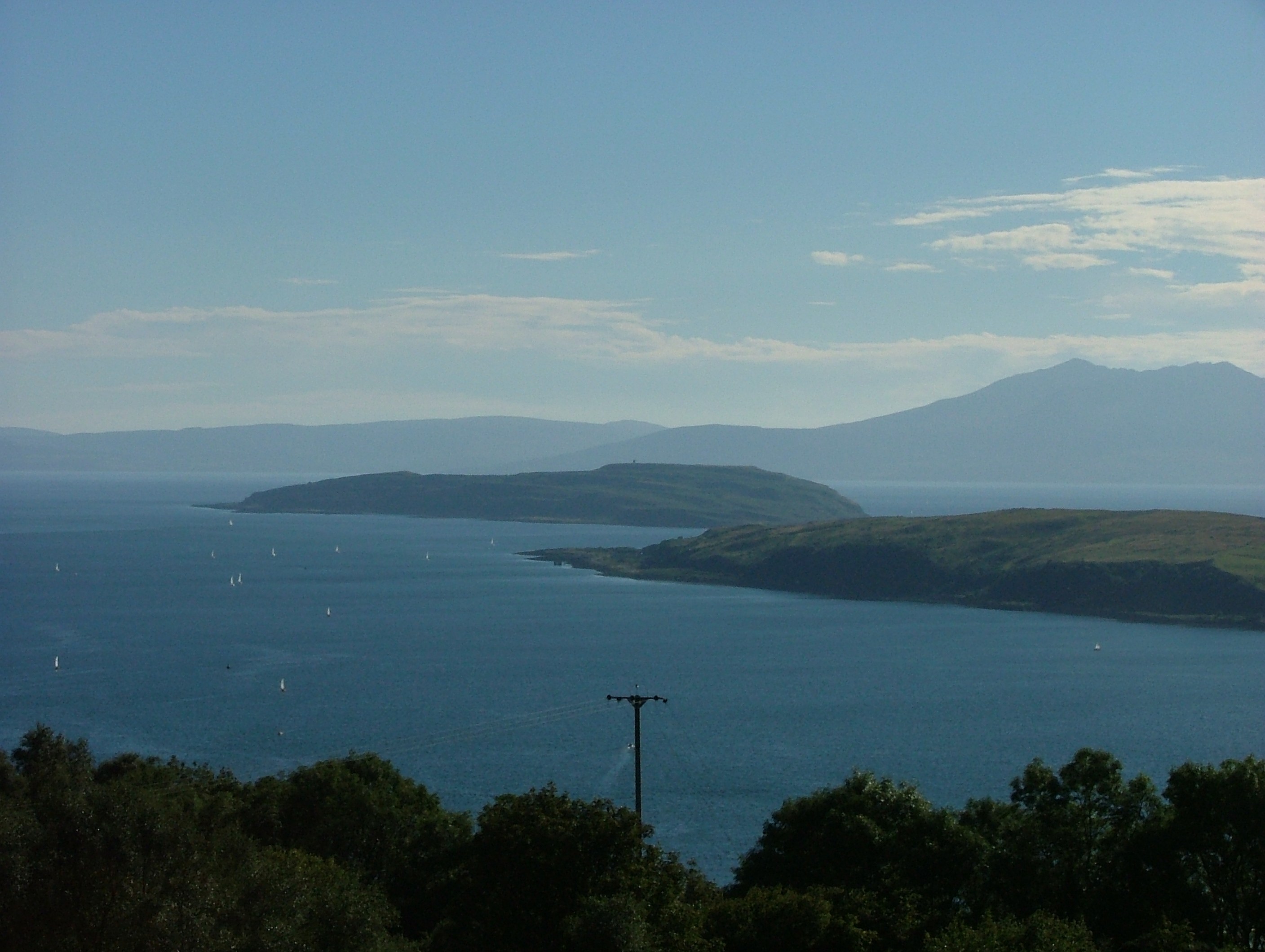
Little Cumbrae seen from Haylie Brae on the mainland. Note Great Cumbrae in the foreground at the right and Arran beyond.

Cumbrae Lighthouse
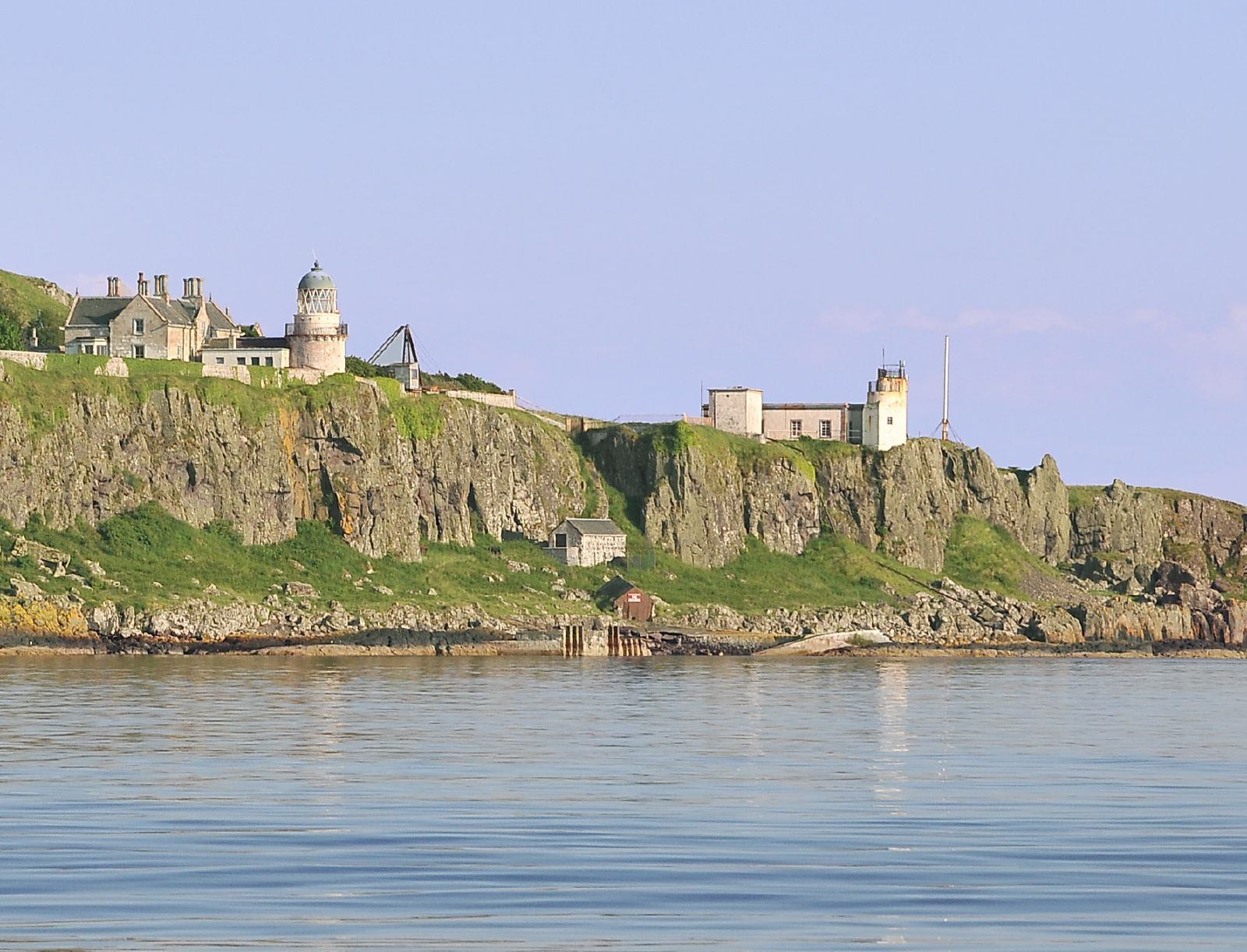
- Little Cumbrae Lighthouse
- Location: Firth of Clyde
- Coordinates: 55°43.2179′N 4°58.0236′W

Tower
- Constructed: 1793
- Construction: Traditional white tower (inoperative) hexagonal/cylindrical tower
- Automated: 1977
- Operator: Clyde Port Authority

Light
- First lit: 1997 (current tower)
- Focal height: 92 feet (28 m)
- Range: nautical miles
- Characteristic: Fl. W 6 sec

The Cumbraes were one of the remote locations that early Irish monks settled. There are six or more known caves on the island. A submarine passage was said to run from Monks' Cave (now known as Kings Cave) at Storrils cliff to Kingarth on the Isle of Bute.

Walter Stewart is said to have built a castle or hunting lodge on Little Cumbrae. His son, Robert II spent time there hunting the deer, however the site of the "Auld Castle" is unknown. It was occupied during hunting expeditions by Robert II in 1375 and 1384, and was demolished by Cromwell's soldiers in 1653.

Little Cumbrae Castle, a small square keep, was built in the 16th century on Castle Island off Little Cumbrae. It was similarly occupied.

In the early 20th century, under the ownership of Evelyn Stuart Parker, a new 'mansion house' was created from the original single storey farmhouse, the gardens were laid out to a plan by Gertrude Jekyll, the renowned garden designer, and substantial repairs were undertaken to the castle and the original lighthouse. The original work commenced in 1913, with subsequent alterations made between 1926 and 1929 when the square tower and top floor were added.

Little Cumbrae is the birthplace of James Archbald, the first mayor of Carbondale, Pennsylvania.

== Cumbrae lighthouses ==
Little Cumbrae Lighthouse Act 1756
- Act of Parliament
- Parliament of Great Britain
- Long title: An Act for erecting, maintaining, and supporting, a Light-house on the Island of Little Cumray in the County of Bute, at the Mouth of the River Clyde in North Britain; and for rendering the Navigation in the Frith and River of Clyde more safe and commodious.
- Citation: 29 Geo. 2. c. 20
- Territorial extent: Great Britain

Dates
- Royal assent: 15 April 1756
- Commencement: 13 November 1755 (Note: Start of session.)
- Repealed: 6 November 1940
Other legislation
Repealed by	Clyde Lighthouses Consolidation Order Confirmation Act 1940

Status: Repealed

Text of statute as originally enacted

James Ewing built the first Little Cumbrae lighthouse on the top of Lighthouse Hill in 1757. This was the second lighthouse in Scotland. An open coal fire was lit at the top of a circular stone tower. Remains of this old structure can still be seen and are designated a scheduled monument.

The traditional Cumbrae Lighthouse was designed and built in 1793 by Thomas Smith under commission from the Commissioners of the Northern Lights. The lighthouse lies on a broad raised beach on the western shore of the island looking out into the Firth, 0.5 km from the first light. It had a foghorn, slipway, jetty, and boathouse. The original oil lamps were replaced by Argand lamps in 1826. In 1865, the foghorn was installed; the first in Britain. The tower was restored in 1956 and a solar-powered light was installed in 1974. The 1793 tower has been unused since 1997, with the light on a 36-foot (11-metre) hexagonal/cylindrical tower adjacent to the old generator house.

== Ownership ==
Little Cumbrae was privately purchased in 2003 and there were plans for its development as a memorial park, nature reserve and corporate escape.

The island was sold again in July 2009 for £2 million. The buyers of the island, a Scottish millionaire couple of Indian origin, Sarwan and Sunita Poddar, opened a yoga and meditation centre there with the help of yoga guru Swami Baba Ramdev. There have also been rumours of the new owners planning to rename it "Peace Island", but those have been denied.

== See also ==
- List of islands of Scotland

== Bibliography ==
- Haswell-Smith, Hamish (2004). The Scottish Islands. Edinburgh: Canongate. ISBN 978-1-84195-454-7.
- Johnston, J. B. (1903). Place-names of Scotland. Edinburgh: David Douglas.
- Iain Mac an Tàilleir. "Placenames" (PDF). Pàrlamaid na h-Alba. Archived from the original (PDF) on 17 March 2007.
- Monro, Sir Donald (1549) Description of the Western Isles of Scotland. First published by William Auld, Edinburgh 1774.
- Munro, R. W. (1961) Monro's Western Isles of Scotland and Genealogies of the Clans. Edinburgh and London. Oliver and Boyd.
- Smith, George Gregory (1894). "Monro, Donald (fl.1550)" . In Lee, Sidney (ed.). Dictionary of National Biography. Vol. 38. London: Smith, Elder & Co.
