= Fairlie, North Ayrshire =

Coordinates: 55.7604°N 4.8541°W

Fairlie: Scots: Fairlie
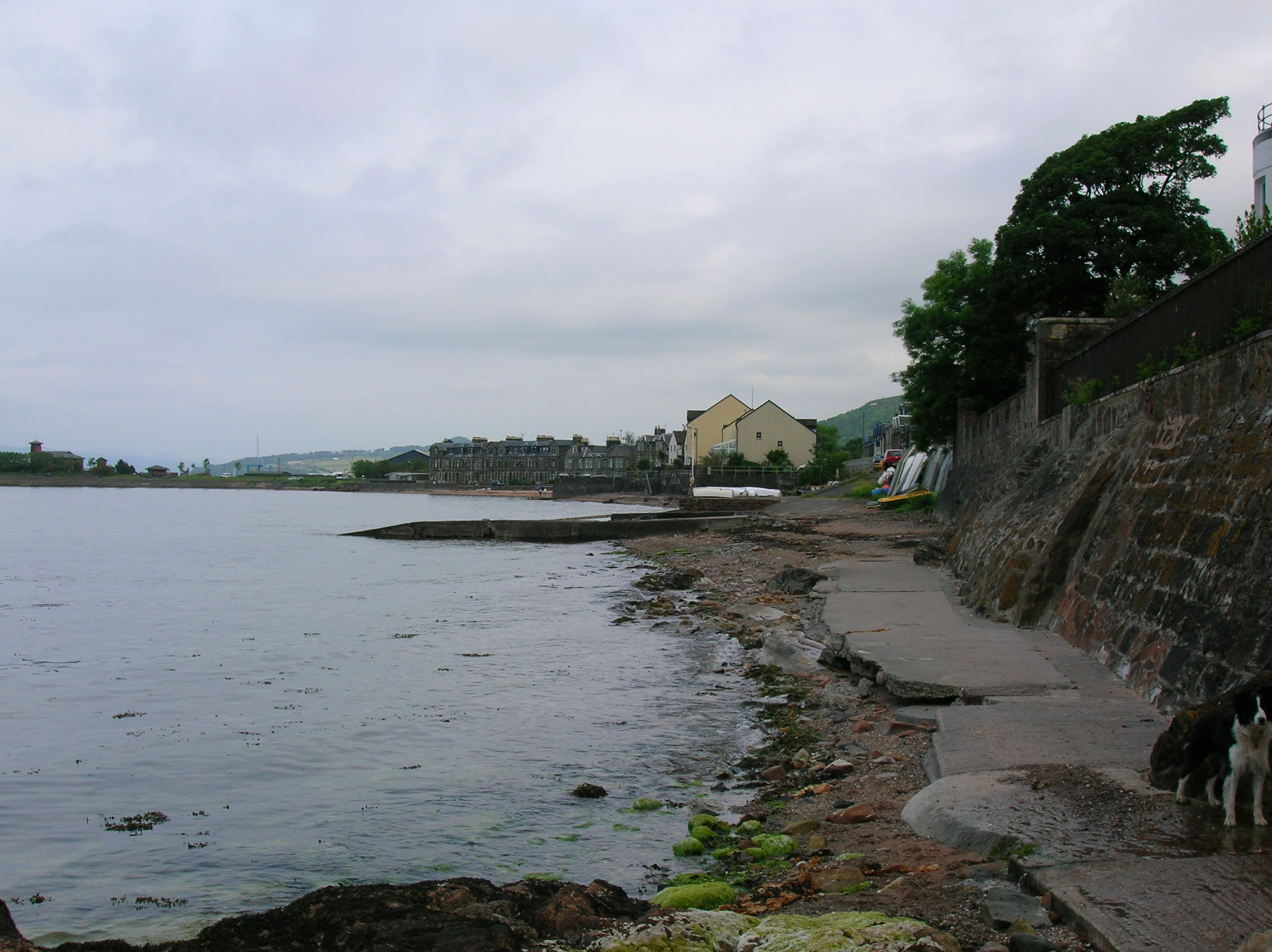
- Fairlie seafront looking towards Largs

- Location within North Ayrshire
- Population: 1,490 (2020)
- Council area: North Ayrshire
- Lieutenancy area: Ayrshire and Arran
- Country: Scotland
- Sovereign state: United Kingdom
- Post town: Largs
- Postcode district: KA29
- Dialling code: 01475
- Police: Scotland
- Fire: Scottish
- Ambulance: Scottish
- UK Parliament: North Ayrshire and Arran
- Scottish Parliament: Cunninghame North

Fairlie is a village in North Ayrshire, on the west coast of Scotland.

== Location and status ==
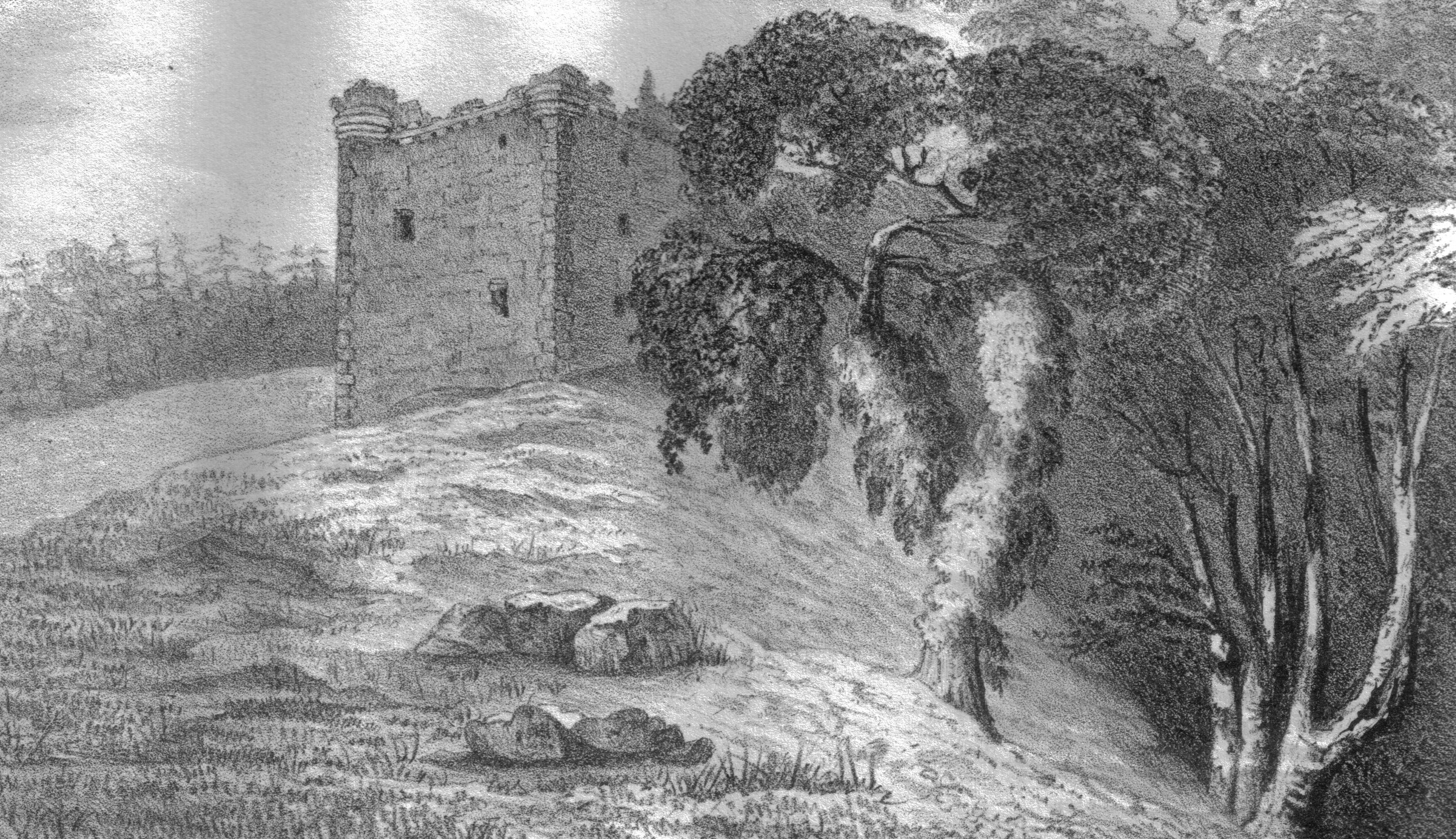
Fairlie Castle in the 1840s.

Fairlie sits on the eastern shore of the Firth of Clyde and looks across to the Isle of Arran and the Cumbraes.

It is currently little more than a commuter village, with few businesses still running within Fairlie. These include the "Village Inn" (a pub and restaurant) and a petrol station

According to the 2001 census, Fairlie counted 1,510 residents.

Fairlie House near Gatehead, Ayrshire in East Ayrshire was named after the Fairlie family of Fairlie; its previous name had been Little Dreghorn.

== History ==
King David I of Scotland appointed Sir Richard de Morville, a Norman, to hold land in Scotland. Thus he became High Constable of Scotland and Lord of Cunninghame, Largs and Lauderdale. This piece of land was later sub-divided among Richard's relatives and friends, and, in the 13th century, the land of Fairlie was held by the de Ros (or Ross) family of Tarbert, the land to the North was held by the Boyle family and to the South by the Sempill family.

It was one of the sons of the Ross family who built the Castle and adopted the name Fairlie. The family continued to live in the Castle until the 17th century, but by the end of the 19th century the castle was in ruins (the Castle has been sold in 1999 to be converted into a dwelling). It has many similarities to Law Castle, Little Cumbrae Castle, and the tower of Skelmorlie Castle.

The land to the South of Fairlie Burn, held by the Sempill family, was never held by the Fairlie family and is actually in the Parish of West Kilbride. The Montgomerie family latterly held the estate (Southannan). Mary, Queen of Scots stayed at Southannan on 30 July 1563. The original building of Southannan House or Castle was demolished in the 18th century and the present house was built some time later.

To the North of Fairlie are the Kelburn lands, with a fine castle, where members of the Boyville (Boyle) family have been since the 12th century. A David Boyle was honoured in 1703 by being created Viscount Kelburn and Earl of Glasgow. One of the later Earls, in 1850, had a wall built round the estate to give work to the poor people of the area. The present Earl has greatly improved and developed the estate. It is now a country centre, open to the public, and attracts many visitors from far and wide.

According to ancient records it would appear that Fairlie developed as a fishing village, as it had a good, sheltered anchorage that was fully used in the 16th century. Weaving also began to help the prosperity of the village as the demand for Paisley shawls increased. The cottages below Fairlie Castle (Burnfoot) were known as Weaver's Row.

A bit further north was the "middle row" (Ferry Row), where the fishermen and ferrymen lived. The remains of the old ferry quay can still be seen. This became known as Knox's Rocks as Knox White, an old Fairlie worthy, hired boats in this area in the 1920s and 1930s.

Still further north was "north row", an indeterminate group of modest dwellings (the Bay Street area). The families kept pigs and hens, grew fruit and vegetables - the more affluent had a cow - other necessities of life were obtained from peddlers, who traveled the countryside. An occasional visit to Largs (by foot) especially to Hyndman's market or to Colm's (Columba's) Day fair.

A turnpike road was built from Greenock to Stranraer in the 18th century and merchants and master mariners began to move into Fairlie. The channel between Fairlie and Cumbrae (Fairlie Roads) was a popular anchorage for merchant shipping, mainly to avoid the dangers of press-gangs at Greenock and the customs could be easier avoided at Fairlie.

The old cottages, in time, were improved and some enlarged, new buildings were erected. Some of the originals are Rockhaven - c1720,(the Ferry House), Fairlie Lodge, Beach House, Allanbank, Fairlie Cottage and part of Brookside.

It was in the late 18th century that John Fyfe came from Kilbirnie to set up business as a cartwright in Fairlie. His son William (1785–1865) founded the Fife & Son shipyard in Fairlie in 1803 to which William's grandson William Fife III (1857–1944) brought international recognition as a prolific designer and builder of sailing yachts.

== MOD base and other facilities ==
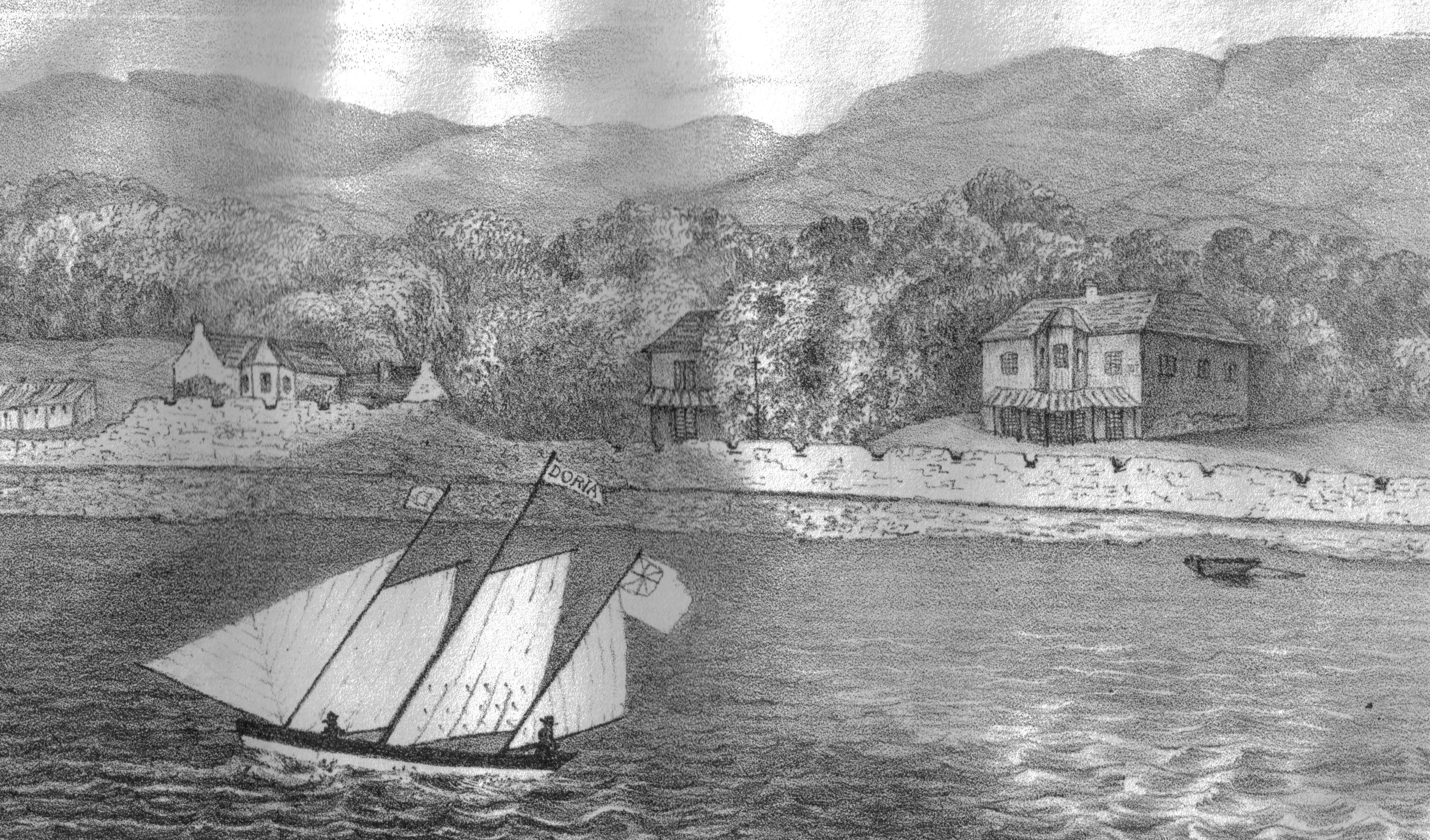
Fairlie in the 1840s

The Royal Navy ASDIC research establishment moved from its base at Portland to Fairlie in November 1940 and took over the Fife & Son shipyard. They also worked on other forms of anti-submarine warfare and in 1941 developed the Fairlie Mortar. This was not very successful but evolved into the very successful Squid. A boom defence depot remained postwar and there was a plan for an anti-submarine boom from Fairlie to Great Cumbrae then continuing to Bute.

In recent years a succession of industrial and military developments has somewhat changed the character of the village. Hunterston B nuclear power station, Hunterston deep sea shipping terminal and a NATO base have been built along the shoreline.

== Fairlie Pier ==
Fairlie Pier provided links to Clyde ferry services and the Largs Branch, and was closed after the final sailing in September 1971. The other railway station in the village still exists and is served by Ayrshire Coast Line services connecting to Glasgow.

== Views of Fairlie Bay and village ==
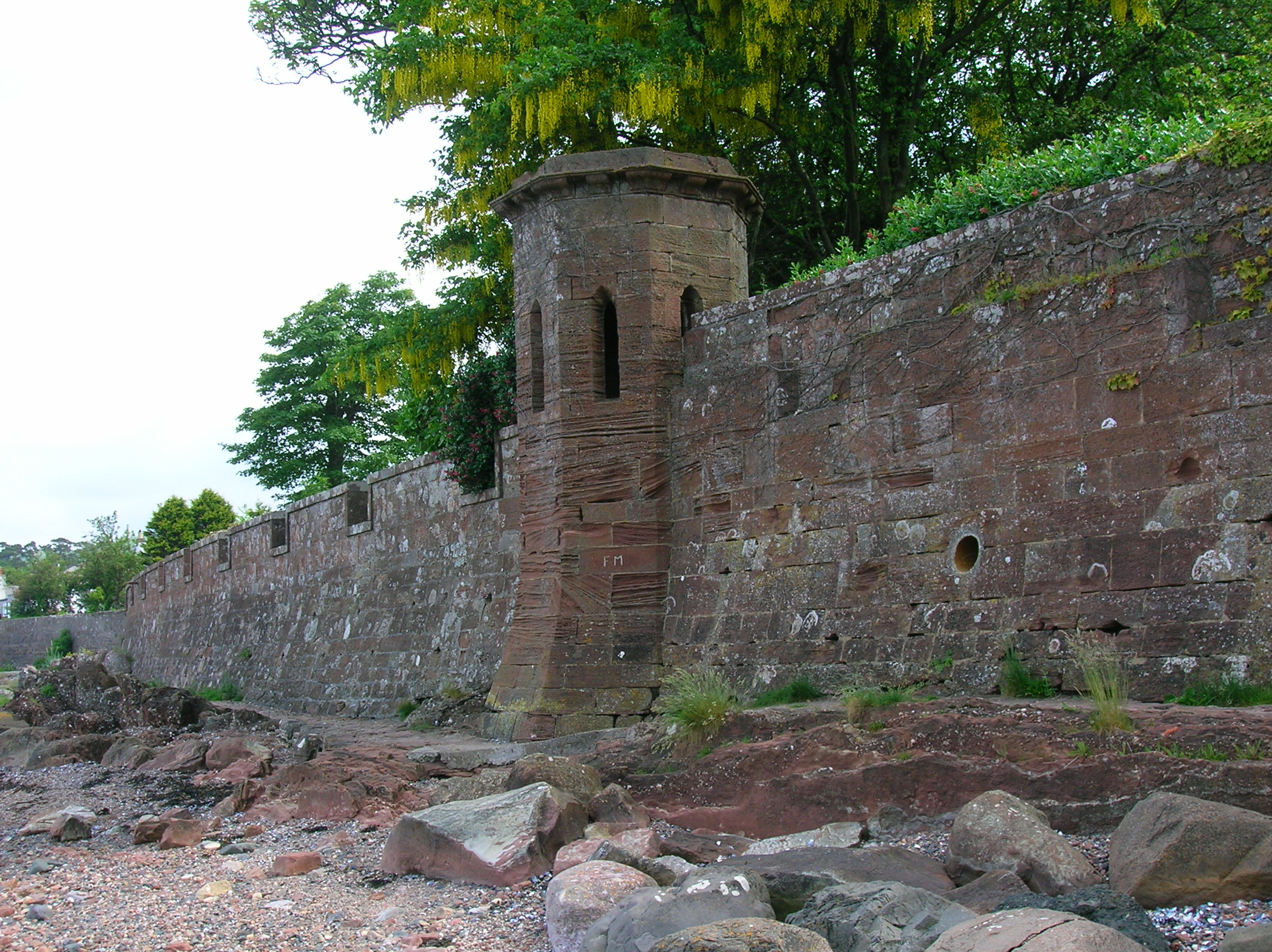
Lookout and sea wall

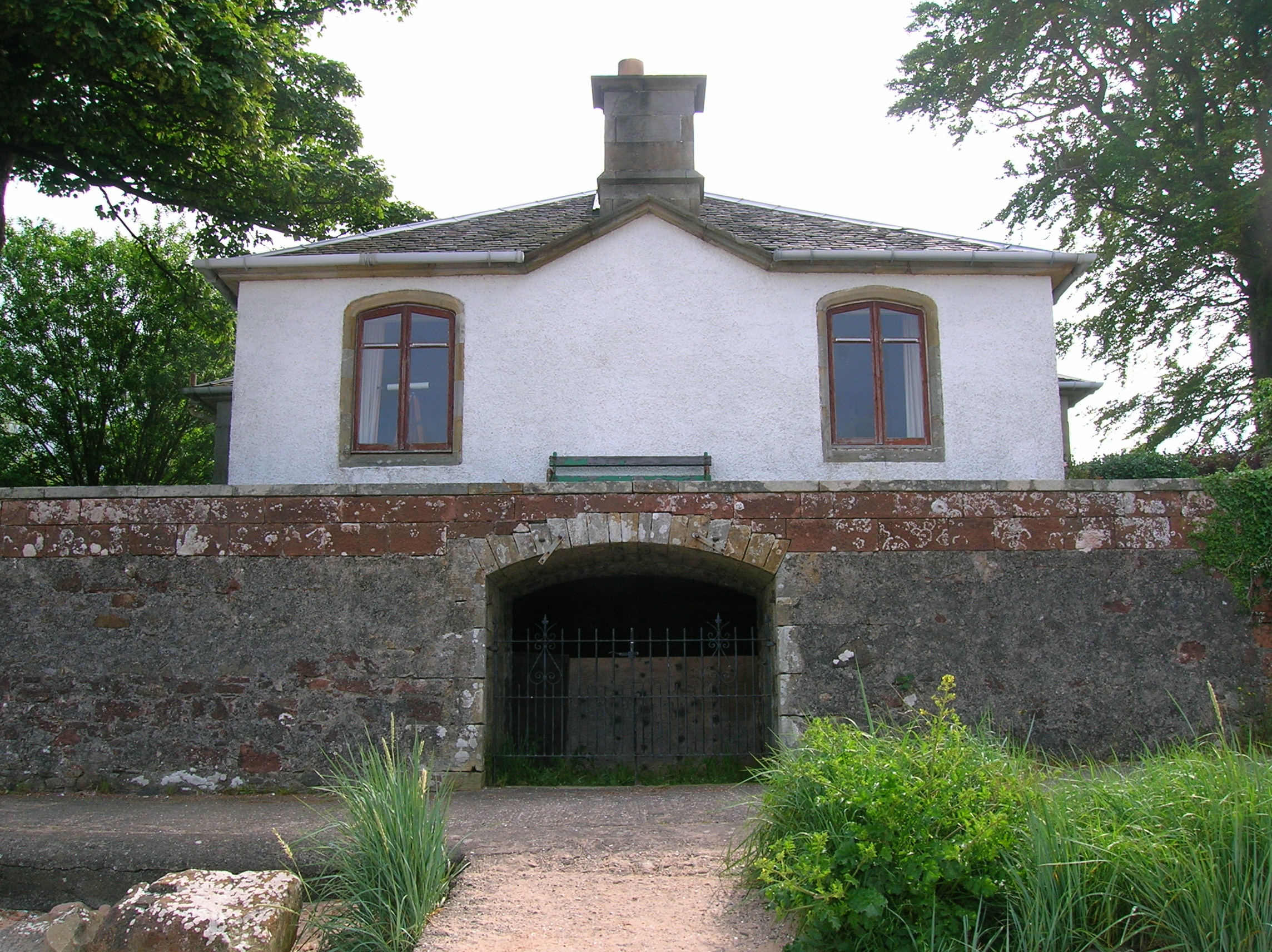
Lodge and subterranean Boat House

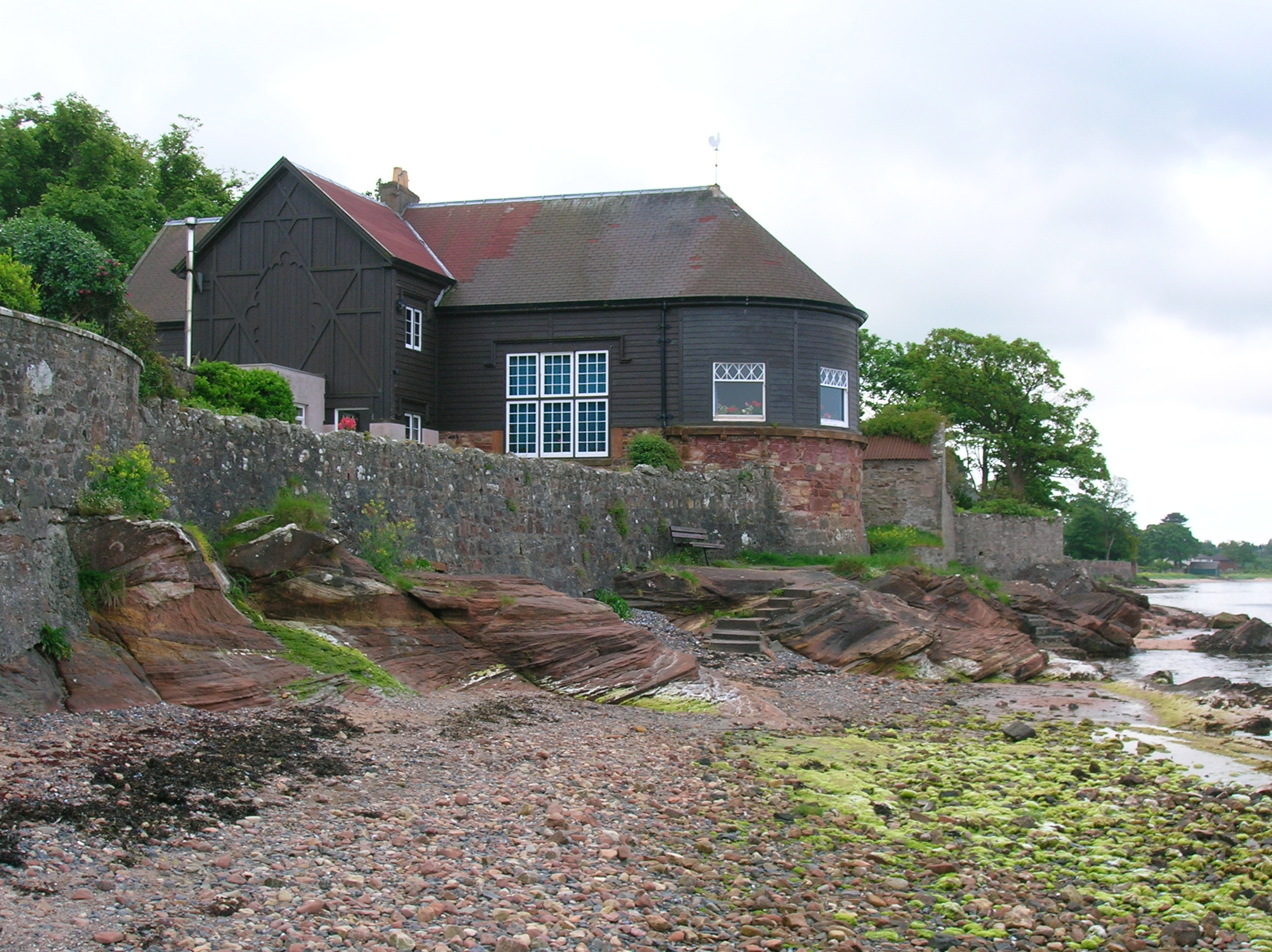
The Pine House

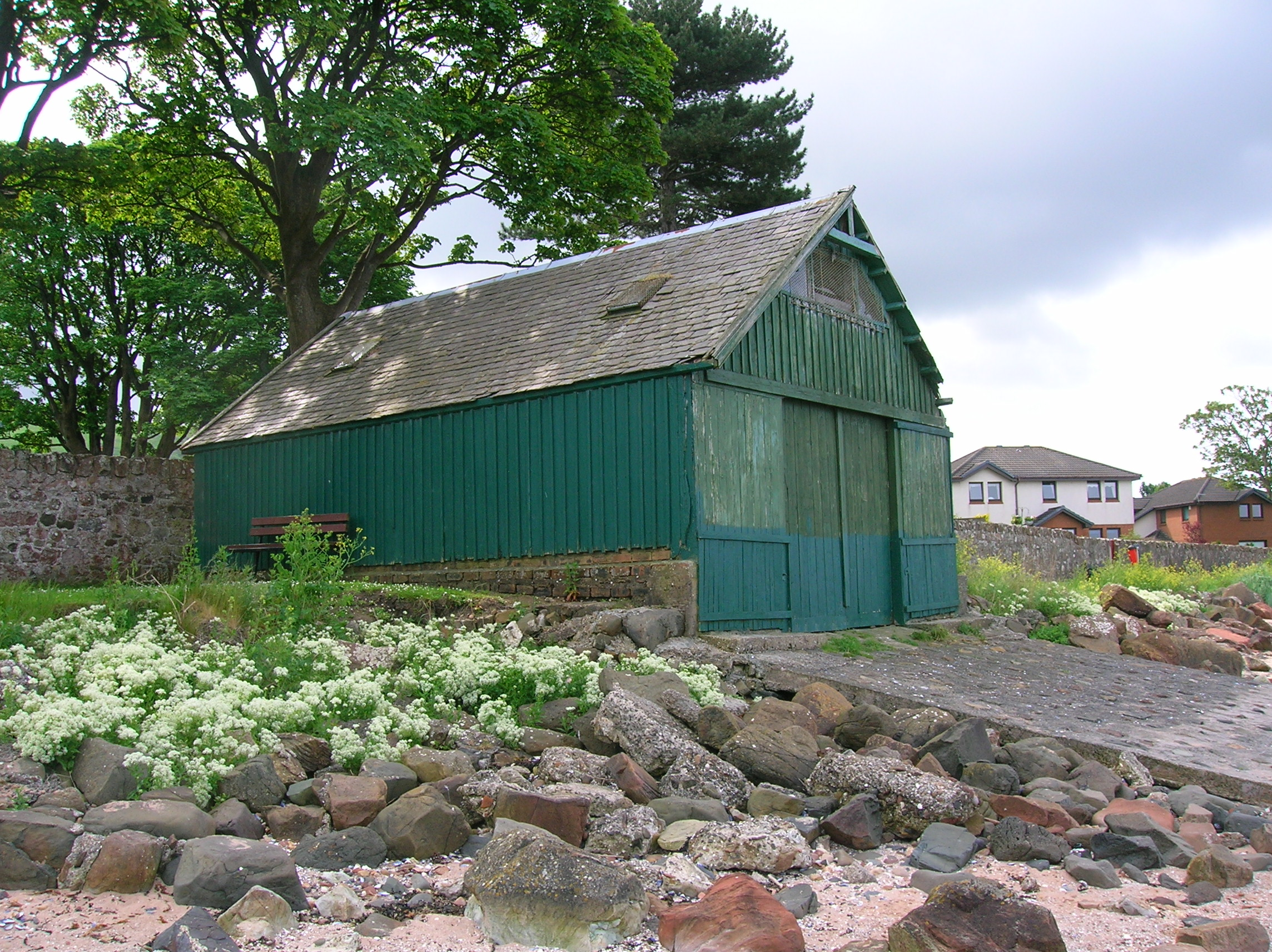
Old Boat House

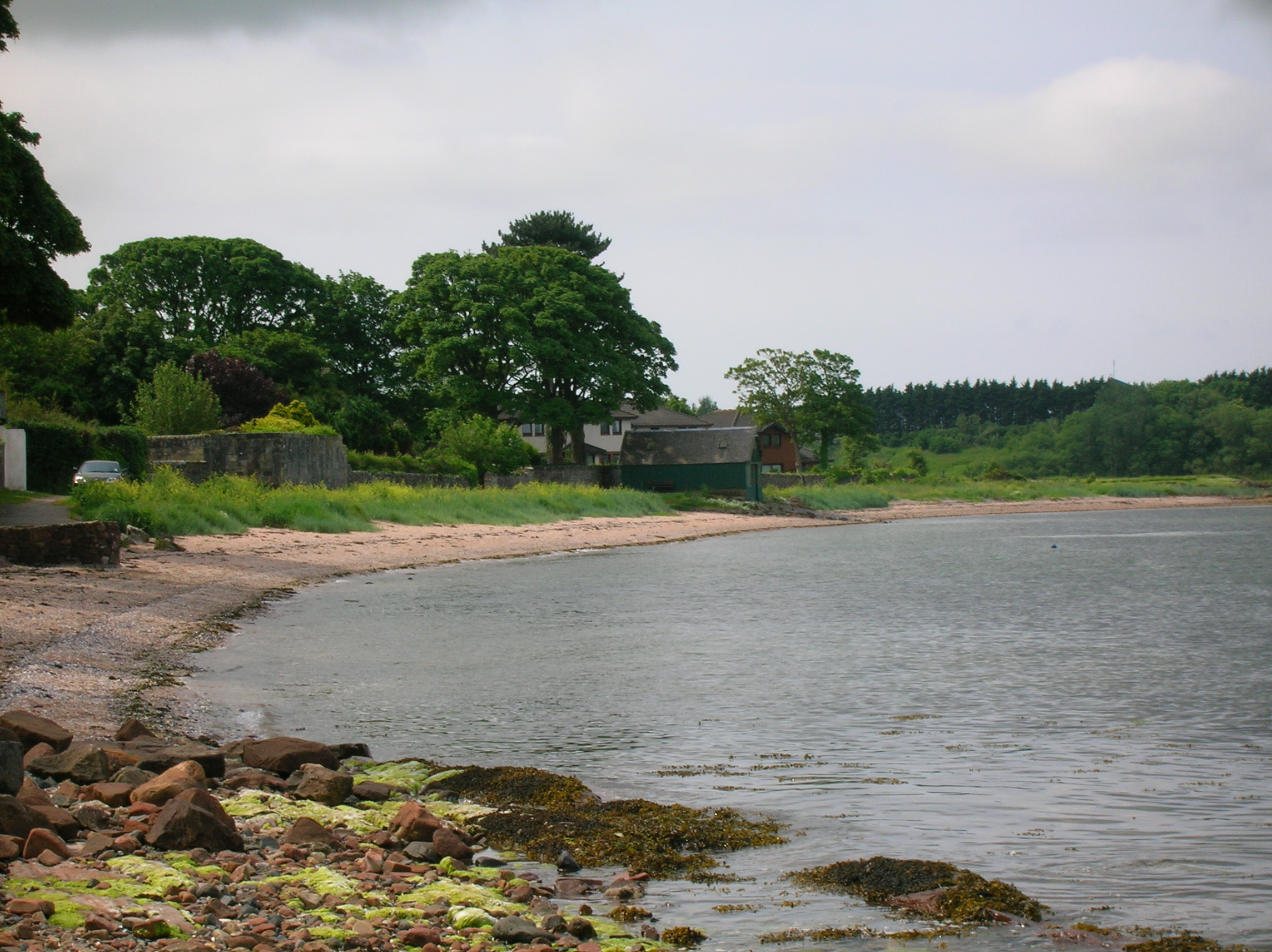
Fairlie Bay looking towards Hunterston

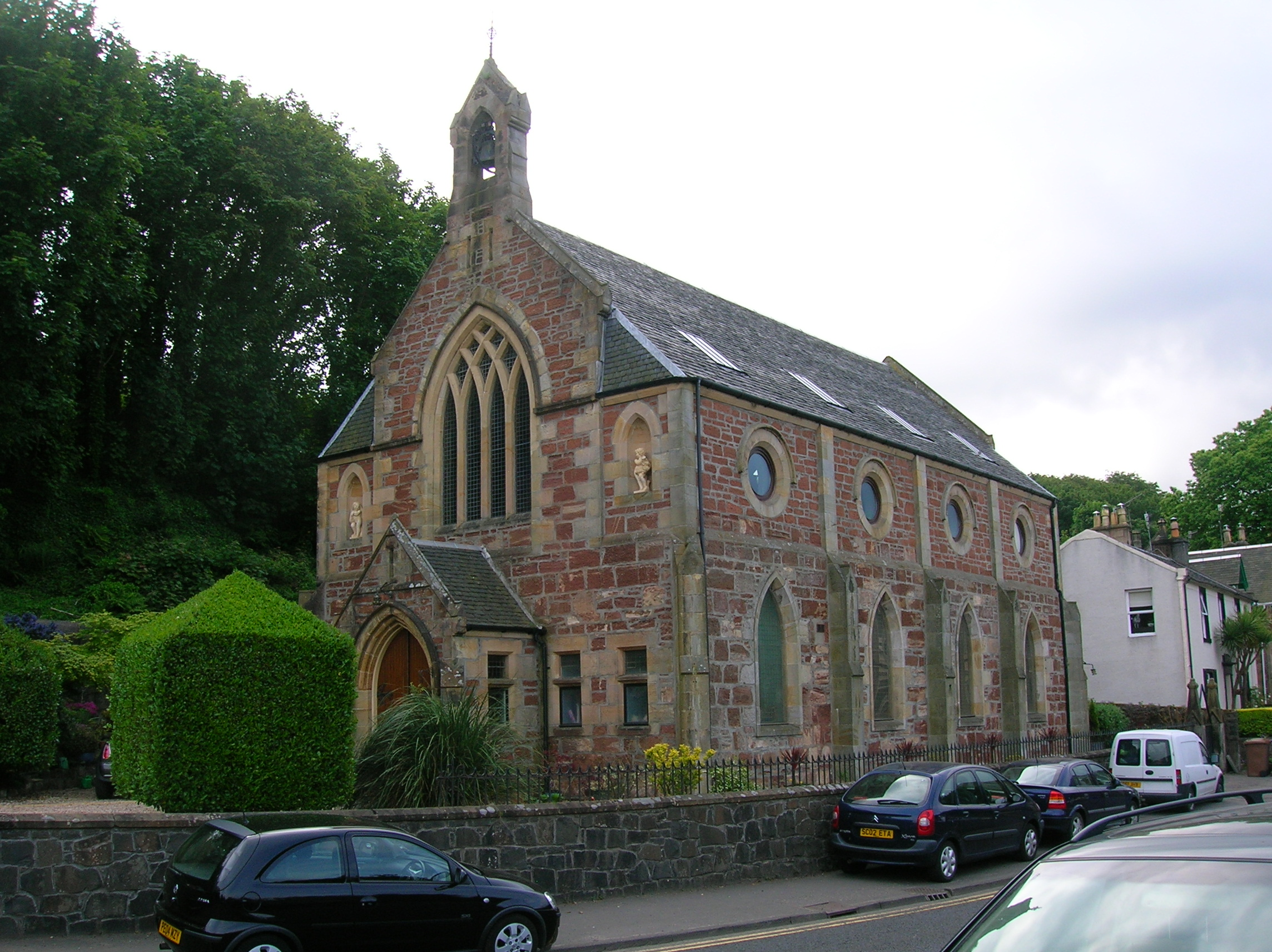
The old Saint Margaret's Church on the main road

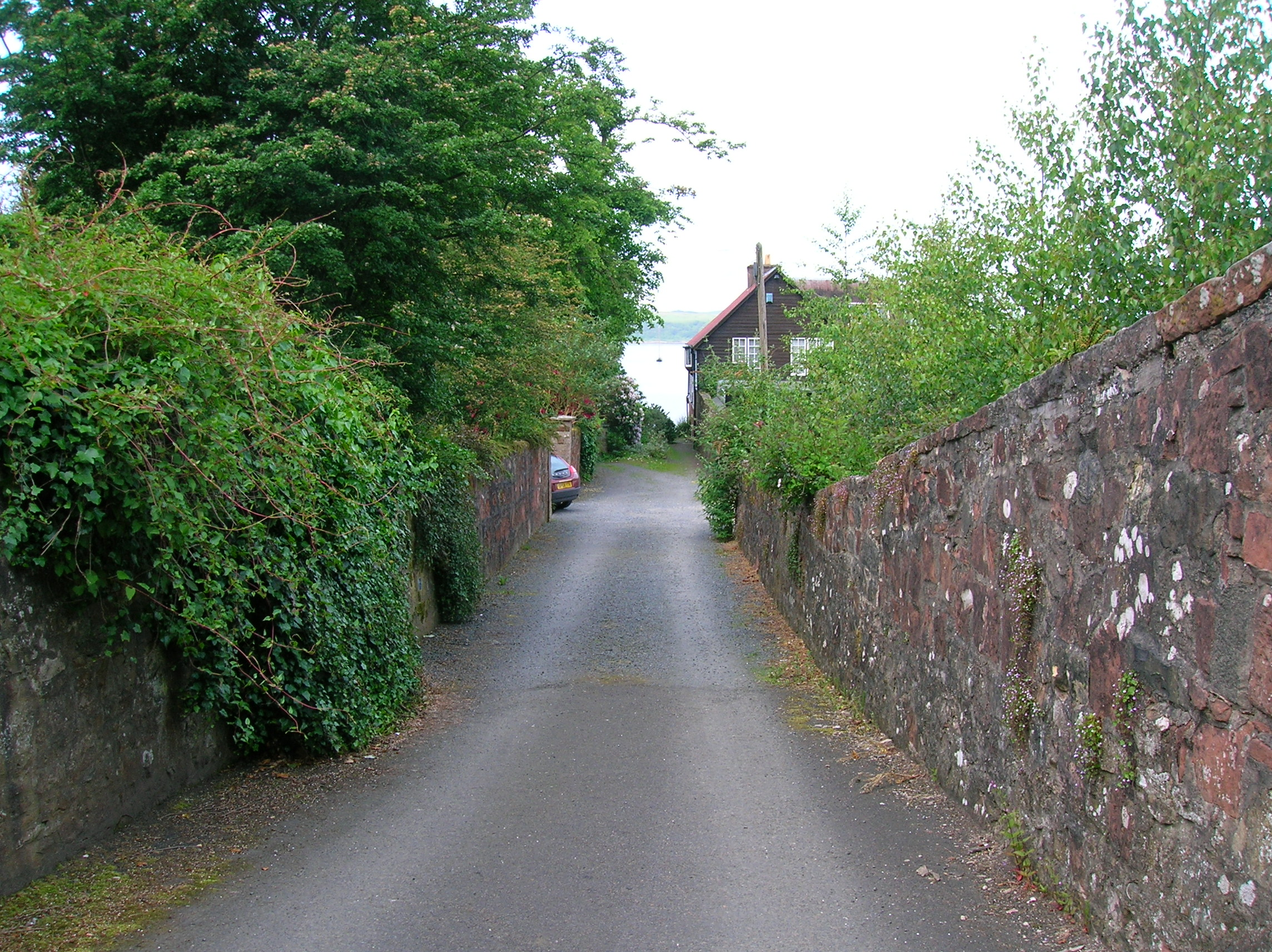
Old lane leading down to the beach

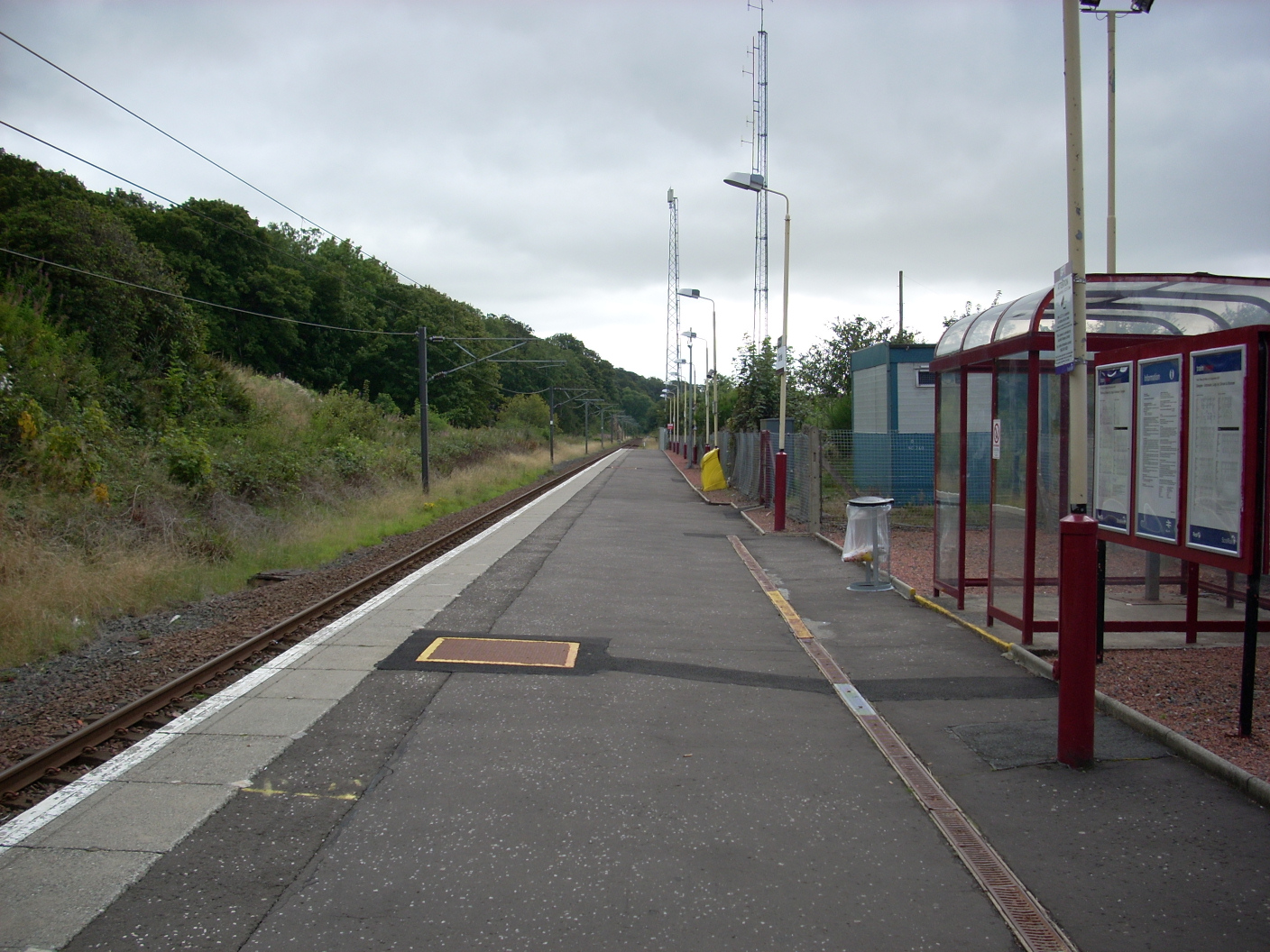
Fairlie station looking towards West Kilbride

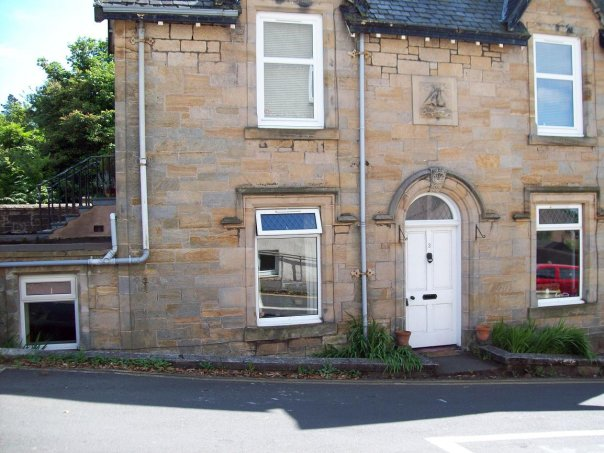
Paragon Villa, built in 1878

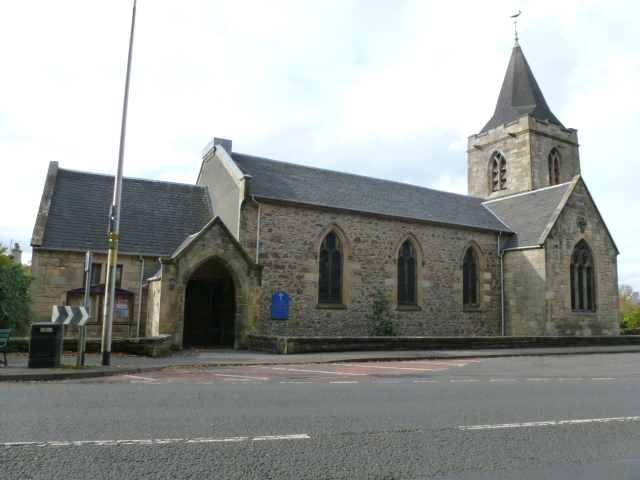
Fairlie parish church

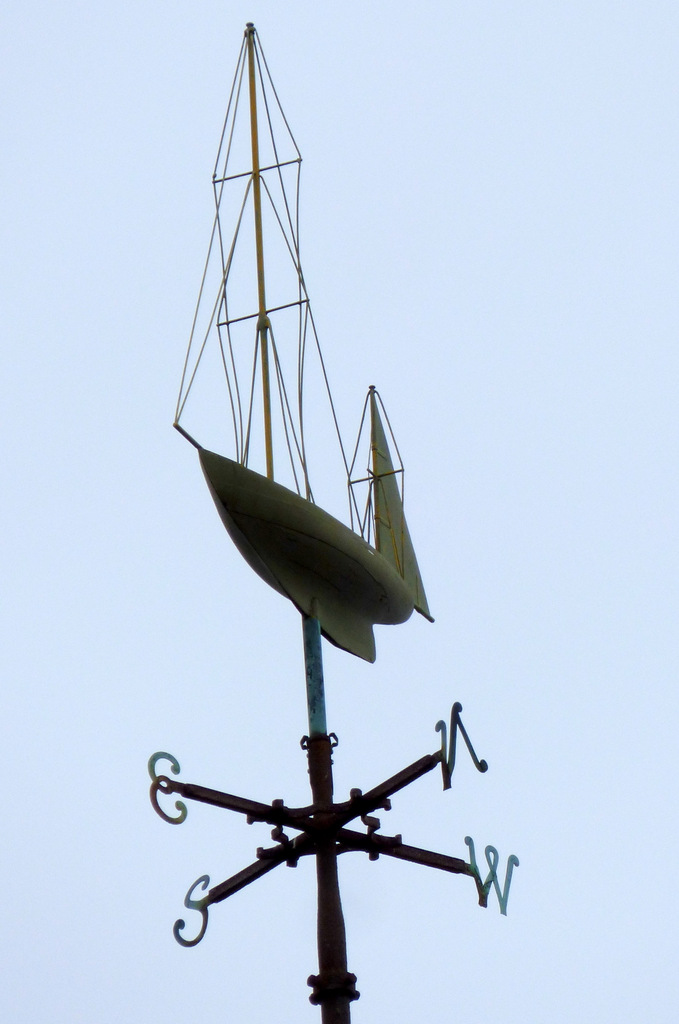
Weather vane in memory of William Fife III
