= Fairlie Castle =

Castle in North Ayrshire, Scotland

- Fairly
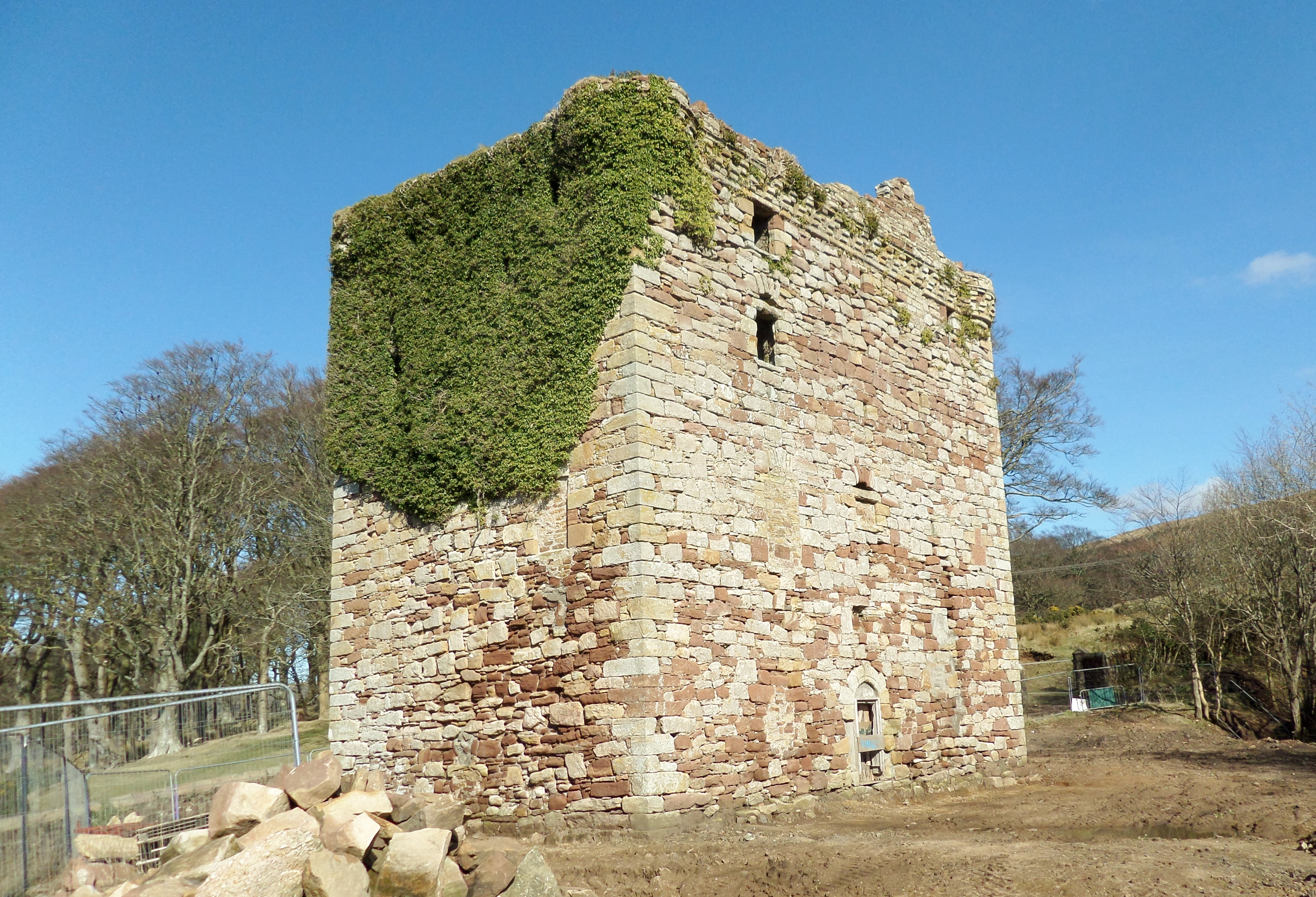
- Fairlie Castle tower from the South-West

- Location within Scotland
- 55°45′16″N 4°50′57″W
- Type: Tower castle
- Periods: Medieval
- Associated with: The Fairlies of that Ilk
- Location: Fairlie, Scotland grid reference NS213549
- Region: North Ayrshire

History
- Built: 15th century or 1521.
- Built by: Sir Robert Fairlie of that Ilk
- Abandoned: 1650s

Site notes
- Material: Stone
- Height: 12.5m (41ft)
- Length: 13.8 m (45 ft)
- Width: 8.7 m (29 ft)
- Condition: Restored
- Owner: Private
- Public access: Private
- Website: Historic Environment Scotland
- The castle and its immediate surroundings were a building site in 2016, restoration is now complete.

Fairlie Castle is a restored oblong tower castle located on a natural rounded knoll situated above a precipitous section of the Fairlie Glen near the town of Fairlie in the old Barony of Fairlie, Parish of Largs, North Ayrshire, Scotland. It was built by the now extinct family, the Fairlies of that Ilk and survives in a fairly good state of preservation. It is a protected scheduled monument.

== History ==
Timothy Pont records that Fairlie was a strong tower with orchards and gardens. One source has it that Sir Robert Fairlie of that Ilk built the present castle in 1521, the family having held the lands since the fourteenth century. In around 1656–1660 the last of the Fairlie family sold the castle and barony to the Boyle family in the person of David, first Earl of Glasgow. Little Cumbrae Castle, Law Castle at West Kilbride and Fairlie Castle are all in the vicinity of the Firth of Clyde and have striking similarities.

=== The lairds ===
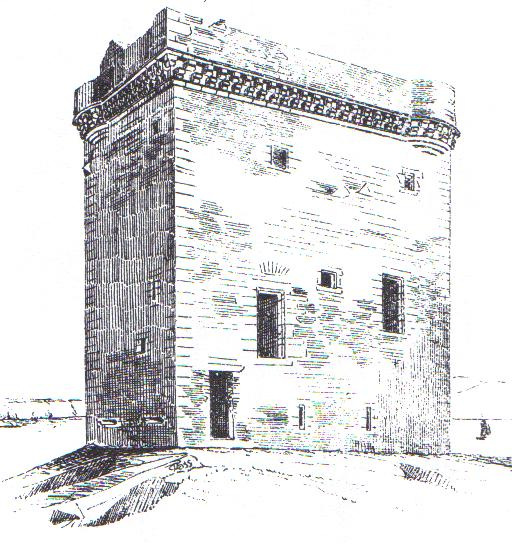
Little Cumbrae Castle.

The Fairlies of that Ilk are said to have originated from the youngest son of the Ross family of Tarbert and upon being granted the lands took the name of the barony as their own. The coat of arms were argent, three water budgets sable and a chevron as a mark of distinction from the Ross family. A water budget or bouget was a pair of leather bags for carrying water at either end of a pole. In 1335 William de Fairlie was included in a pardon granted by Edward III at Berwick on Tweed. In 1526 Catherine Crawford of Kilbirnie married David Fairlie and the couple had one son, Robert. Catherine died in 1547, aged 40.

David Fairlie is recorded by George Robertson as being married to Catherine Crawfurd of Kilbirnie and one of their three co-heiress daughters married Robert Boyd of Portencross in around 1550.

A Katarine Craufurd, Lady Fairnelie (sic), is recorded as having died in December 1601. A list of her possessions gives an idea of the life that the Fairlie's led at their castle with large amounts of household linen, wearing apparel, all sorts of cooking utensils, stores of wine, barrelled meat, full chests, both large and small, etc. Cattle, sheep, corn and barley were also listed.

Sir John Fairlie of that Ilk married Marion Crawford of Jordanhill and in June 1605 they obtained a charter of the ten merk land of Fairlie. John Fairlie of that Ilk is recorded to have had a daughter Marion who married Thomas Boyd of Linn and later remarried into the ancestral line of the Marquis of Bute.

A William Fairlie of that Ilk is recorded to have married Catherine Brisbane of Brisbane in the early eighteenth century which contradicts the suggestion that the seller of Fairlie in around 1650 was the last of the male line of the Fairlies of that Ilk although he may have been, for Elizabeth Craufurd of Craufurdland, daughter of John Craufurd and Elizabeth Kerr of Morrieston, married twice, her first husband being a William Fairlie of that Ilk. This couple had a single daughter who died in infancy. Elizabeth remarried in 1744.

The last member of the Fairlie family sold the castle, the barony and its lands to David, first Earl of Glasgow in around 1650. The castle has since been sold to a private owner.

== Structural remains ==
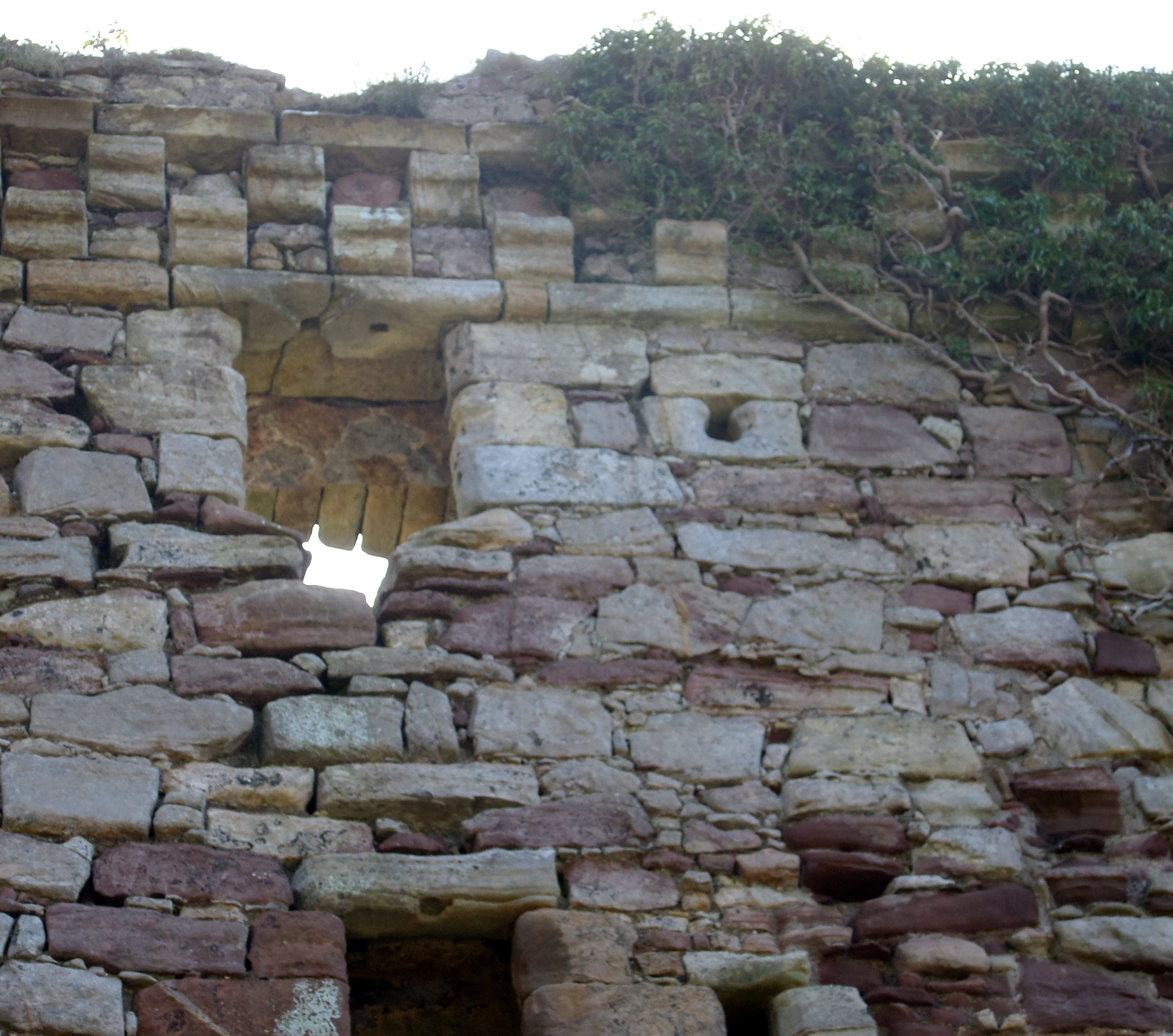
A gun port lying to the right of a window.

Fairlie Castle is 12.5 m (41 ft) in height to the parapet walk and is at present roofless. It is a typical tower castle without any artificial motte or a bailey. It had four storeys, each one sub-divided and two vaulted cellars that were accessed by a private stairs. Roundels or bartizans are present at all four corners and a chequered corbels design provides a support to the parapet. The private chambers were supplied with window seats, toilets, fireplaces and well formed window embrasures. The hall, with its kitchen at the east end, was located on the first floor. The main entrance is on the ground floor and faces south. The walls were 1.6m thick. Gun ports are present for the defence of the castle against besiegers.

The castle stands in a defensible situation overlooking the steep, wooded and picturesque Fairlie Glen on its southern side, the boundary between the parishes of West Kilbride and Largs.

=== The causeway ===
The metalled path that today runs past the castle shows extensive remains of very old paving that suggests that it was once a main communication route and probably ran across Fairlie Moor to Dalry.

== The Ballad of Hardyknute ==
Elizabeth, Lady Wardlaw is thought by some to be the author of a legend based at Fairlie Castle, namely The Ballad of Hardyknute published in 1719. It was said to an old poem discovered by Lady Wardlaw, locked in a vault at Dunfermline and written on scraps of paper, however no manuscript was ever produced and in the 1767 edition of Percy's Reliques the poem was ascribed to her. Others have disputed the setting as being Fairlie Castle, suggesting Glengarnock Castle as a more plausible location for this work of fiction. Paterson was of the opinion that a kernel of truth existed regarding the legend.

The essence of the story is that Hardyknute, an elderly warrior, is called upon to support the Scottish King at what became known as the Battle of Largs. Despite his age he gathers his sons and men and sets off to support his sovereign lord at Largs, but on the way they encounter a seemingly mortally wounded knight who despite an offer of assistance asks to be left to die. On their victorious return from the battle they find the castle silent and abandoned and the implication is that the youngest son, daughter and possibly others have fallen prey to the traitorous wounded knight.

== Micro-history ==
The Fairlie Estate near Old Rome and Gatehead had been known as 'Little Dreghorn', until William Fairlie of Bruntsfield near Edinburgh gave it his family name in around 1704. Members of this family can be confused with the Fairlies of that Ilk.

'Fairlie' may derive from the Old English for a meadow or untilled land grazed by sheep.

Elvira Anna Phipps visited the castle in 1841 and produced a very competent engraving showing that it was without a roof and the parapet was in ruins, much as it is today. She was informed that it was of Danish origin.
