= Sam Fairley =

New Zealand cricketer (born 1980)

Samuel Anthony Fairley (born 19 September 1980) is a New Zealand cricketer who plays for the Wellington Firebirds. He has also played for Wellington City in the Hawke Cup. He was born in Whakatāne.
