= Charles Fairlie Dobbs =

British Indian Army officer (1872–1936)

Colonel Charles Fairlie Dobbs CIE CBE DSO
- Born: 1 July 1872
- Died: 27 December 1936 (aged 64)
- Military career
- Allegiance: United Kingdom
- Branch: British Indian Army
- Service years: 1891-1921
- Rank: Colonel
- Commands: 94th Russell's Infantry
- Conflicts: World War I Third Anglo-Afghan War
- Awards: Companion of the Order of the Indian Empire; Commander of the Order of the British Empire; Companion of the Distinguished Service Order

Colonel Charles Fairlie Dobbs CIE CBE DSO (1 July 1872 – 27 December 1936) was a British Indian Army officer.

Dobbs was the son of Colonel A. F. Dobbs, also of the Indian Army. He was educated at Bedford School and then obtained a commission in a militia battalion, the 4th Battalion, Royal Irish Rifles, in January 1891. He resigned his commission in March 1891 to attend the Royal Military College, Sandhurst. He was commissioned second lieutenant into the Lancashire Fusiliers in June 1892. In October 1894 he transferred to the Indian Army and joined the 95th Russell's Infantry (later 94th Russell's Infantry). He was promoted captain in July 1901. He served in Aden from 1903 to 1904 and graduated from the Indian Staff College at Quetta in 1908. He was appointed brigade major in May 1909, promoted to major in June 1910, and from July 1911 to June 1913 served as a brigade staff officer.

During the First World War, Dobbs served in the East Africa Campaign as assistant quartermaster-general, for which he was mentioned in dispatches three times. He was promoted to temporary lieutenant-colonel in November 1915 and brevet lieutenant-colonel in January 1916. He was awarded the Distinguished Service Order (DSO) in January 1917 and the Russian Order of Saint Anna 3rd Class. He was promoted to substantive lieutenant-colonel in 1917, and then took command of his regiment until 1921. He served with the Bushire Field Force in Persia from 1918 to 1919, for which he was again mentioned in despatches and appointed Companion of the Order of the Indian Empire (CIE) in January 1920. He served in the Third Anglo-Afghan War in 1919, for which he was mentioned in despatches for the fifth time and appointed Commander of the Order of the British Empire (CBE) in August 1920. He served in Mesopotamia in 1920. In October 1919, he was given the temporary rank of brigadier-general. He retired with the rank of colonel in October 1921.

Dobbs married Margaret Eleanor Jopp. They had one son and two daughters.
