= Fiona Hamilton-Fairley =

Founder of The Kids' Cookery School

- Born: 1963; England
- Children: 3
- Culinary career
- Cooking style: Children's cooking

Fiona Hamilton-Fairley MBE (born 1963) is the founder and CEO of The Kids' Cookery School in Acton, West London. She founded the cookery school for children in 1995 and she has authored three books. She was appointed a Member of the Order of the British Empire in 2019.

== Career ==
After completing a Cordon Bleu course, Hamilton-Fairley worked as a chef, and founded and managed her own catering company, Corporate Catering Company. Hamilton-Fairley's vocation for teaching cookery was sparked in 1987 when she began to teach adults how to cook in a number of adult educational centres in London boroughs.

=== The Kids' Cookery School ===
Hamilton-Fairley founded The Kids' Cookery School (KCS) in 1995, raising funds to build the purpose-built teaching kitchens in Acton, West London. Children aged 3-16 years old attend for practical cookery lessons, where they learn to cook healthy food from fresh ingredients. Almost 13, 000 children a year are taught at The Kids' Cookery School. The goal of the school is to teach children healthy choices and teach them valuable life skills. Hamilton-Fairley learned that a majority of parents believed teaching children cooking skills is important, however very few actually have the time to teach their own children.

KCS offers assisted places and includes children who are disengaged with or excluded from education, or who have disabilities or special needs. The main focus is on savoury food that children will eat, with instruction in safety and familiarity with raw ingredients.

In 2009, Hamilton-Fairley's Kids' Cookery School started 'KCS on wheels'. Experienced chefs are sent to communities to bring cooking to children who otherwise might not experience the school.

In 2018, Hamilton-Fairley continued to advocate for children learning to cook. She has said that for two decades children were not taught to cook is schools and now they are a generation that lives on junk food. Hamilton-Fairley has been called a children's cooking expert.

=== Funding ===
The school is a registered charity and relies on donations from charitable trusts, companies, individuals and government.

== Awards ==
- 2002 - The Guardian Charity Award
- 2015 - The Halifax Giving Extra Award
- 2019 - MBE "for services to Children with Special Educational Needs and Disabilities".

== Books ==
- I Can’t Cook (1993) By Fiona Hamilton-Fairley, Bloomsbury Press ISBN 9780747513995 Hardcover (United Kingdom) 24 June 1993; ISBN 9780747514008 Paperback (United Kingdom) 26 August 1994
- I Can’t Cook: Entertaining (1995) By Fiona Hamilton-Fairley, Bloomsbury Press ISBN 9780747522997 Hardcover (United Kingdom) 24 August 1995
- The Kids' Cook Book (2005) By Fiona Hamilton-Fairley, Self-published
- Little Cooks: 30 Delicious Recipes to Make and Enjoy (1 April 2008) By Fiona Hamilton-Fairley, New Holland Publishers ISBN 978-1845379841
