= John Archibald Fairlie =

American political scientist

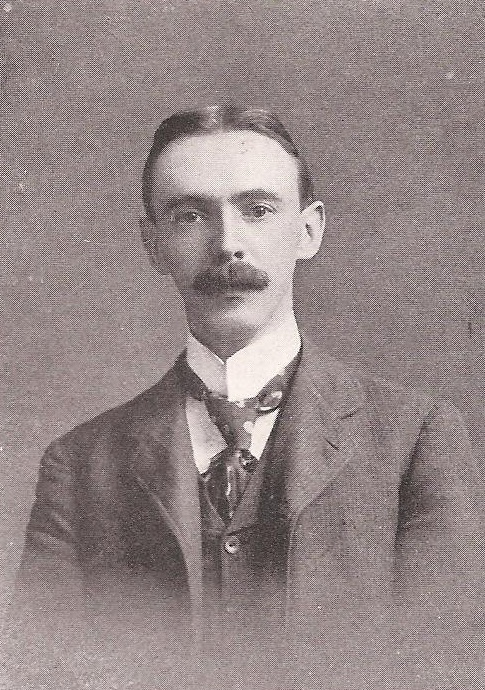
- John Archibald Fairlie, c. 1906
- Born: October 30, 1872; Glasgow, Scotland
- Died: January 26, 1947 (aged 74)
- Known for: Political scientist

John Archibald Fairlie (October 30, 1872 – January 26, 1947) was an American political scientist.

== Biography ==
Fairlie was born in Glasgow, Scotland in October 1872. He moved with his family to Jacksonville, Florida in 1881 at age eight. He graduated from Jacksonville High School in 1887. He attended Harvard University, receiving a Bachelor of Arts degree in 1895 and a Master of Arts degree in 1896. He enrolled at the Columbia University School of Political Science in 1897, earning a Doctor of Philosophy degree in 1898.

After spending a year as the secretary to the Roosevelt-Greene Committee on Canals of New York State, Fairlie became a lecturer on municipal administration at Columbia. In 1900, he joined the faculty of the University of Michigan as an assistant professor of administrative law. In 1901, he published the book Municipal Administration.

He became a junior professor in 1906. In 1929, he was elected president of the American Association of Political Science. Throughout his professional career, he was a frequent contributor to early political science journals, including "The Political Science Quarterly," "The Quarterly Journal of Economics," and "The Annals of the American Academy of Social and Political Science." He also served on the board of editors of "The American Political Science Review." Fairlie later joined the faculty of the University of Illinois and became chair of the university's political science department. Fairlie died in January 1947.

== Selected publications ==
- "The Centralization of Administration in the State of New York, by John Archibald Fairlie (New York, 1898)
- The Economic Effects of Ship Canals, by J.A. Fairlie (American Academy of Political and Social Science, 1898)
- "Municipal Administration", by John Archibald Fairlie (The Macmillan Company, 1901)
- "American Municipal Councils," by John Archibald Fairlie (Ginn & Co., 1904)
- "The National Administration of the United States of America, by John A. Fairlie (The Macmillan Company, 1905)
- "The Relation of Civil Service Reform to Municipal Administration, by John Archibald Fairlie (National Civil Service Reform League, 1906)
- "Local Government in Counties, Towns and Villages," by John Archibald Fairlie (The Century Co., 1906)
- "Some Suggested Changes in the Constitution of Michigan, by John Archibald Fairlie (Michigan Law Review, 1907)
- "The Street Railway Question in Chicago, by John Archibald Fairlie (The Quarterly Journal of Economics, 1907)
- "Essays in Municipal Administration, by John A. Fairlie (The Macmillan Company, 1908)
- "Public regulation of water power in the United States and Europe, by John A. Fairlie (1911)
- "Taxation in Illinois, by John Archibald Fairlie (American Economic Association, 1911)
- "The Referendum and Initiative in Michigan, by John Archibald Fairlie (American Academy of Political and Social Sciences, 1912)
- "County and Town Government in Illinois, by John Archibald Fairlie (American Academy of Political Science, 1913)
- "British War Administration", by John Archibald Fairlie (Oxford University Press, 1919)
- "Administrative Procedure in Connection with Statutory Rules and Orders in Great Britain, by John Archibald Fairlie (University of Illinois, 1927)
