= Castle Island, Scotland =

Island in Scotland

Coordinates: 55°43′13.08″N 4°56′30.52″W

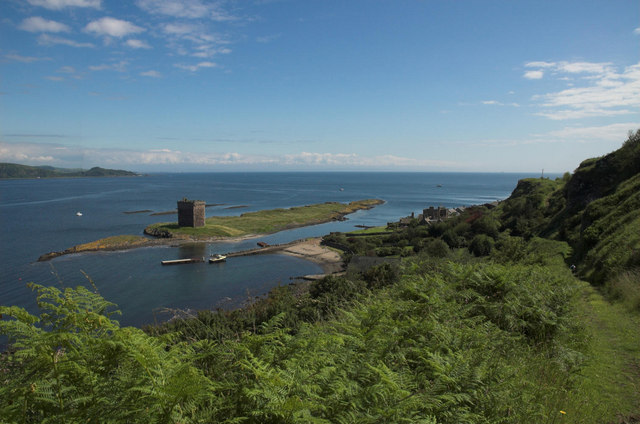
Castle Island from Little Cumbrae

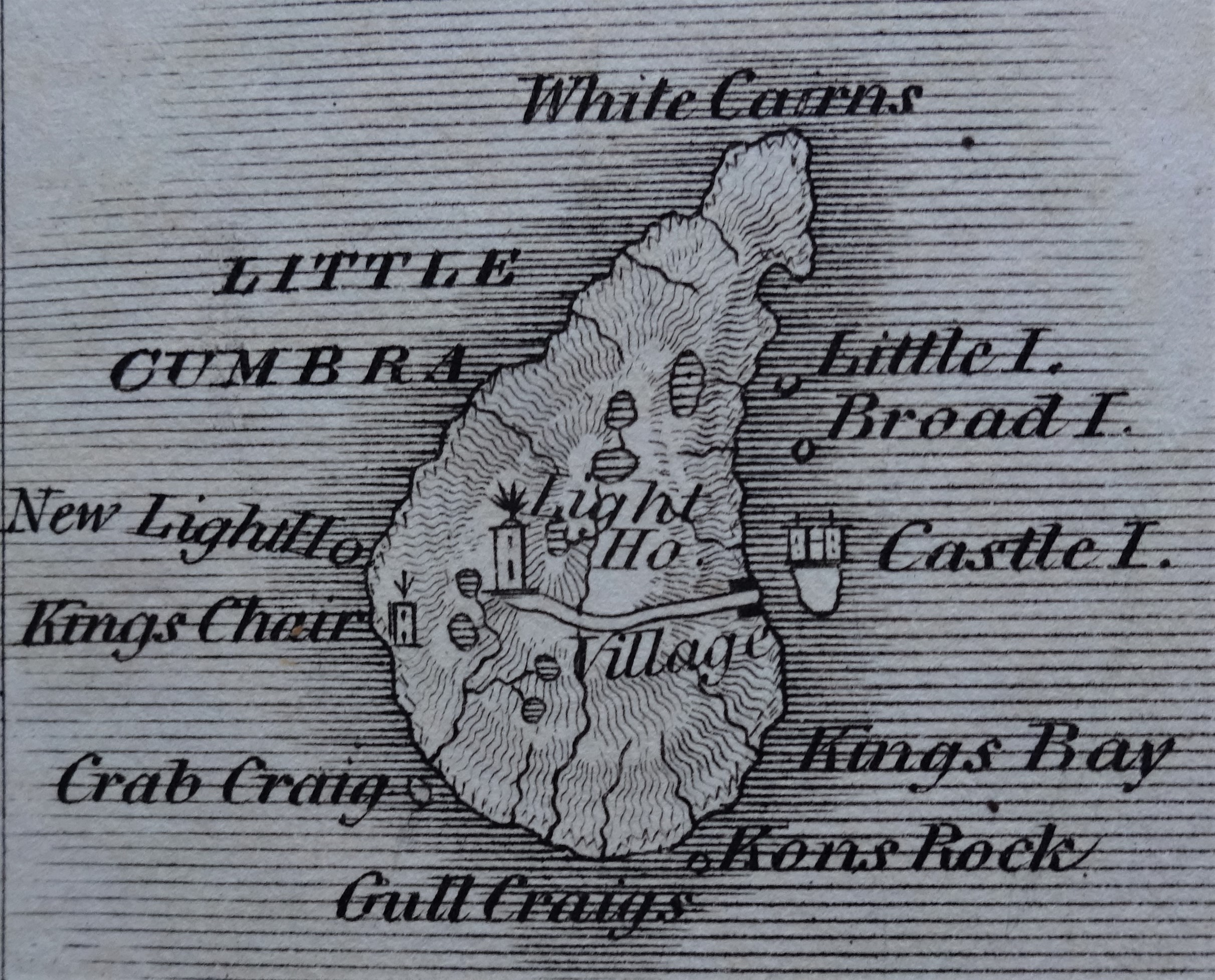
Little Cumbrae in 1828

Castle Island (Scottish Gaelic: Eilean a' Chaisteil) or Allimturrail is a small tidal island, lying off the east coast of Little Cumbrae, and to the west of Trail Island, in the Firth of Clyde. It is joined to Little Cumbrae at low tide.

The castle which gives the island its name was built in 1527, and was destroyed by Cromwellian forces in 1650. It is a square keep, and is said to have been built originally to prevent deer poaching.
