= Little Cumbrae Castle =

Castle in North Ayrshire, Scotland

Little Cumbrae castle
- Little Cumbrae, North Ayrshire, Scotland; UK
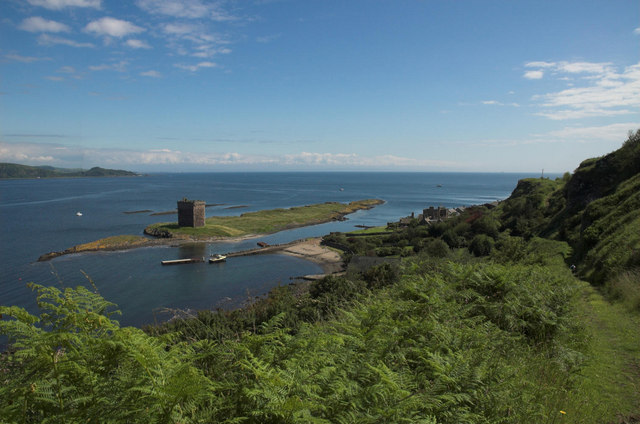
- The castle as seen from Little Cumbrae

Site information
- Owner: Private
- Controlled by: Montgomery clan
- Open to the public: No
- Condition: A substantial ruin

Location
- Shown next to Little Cumbrae
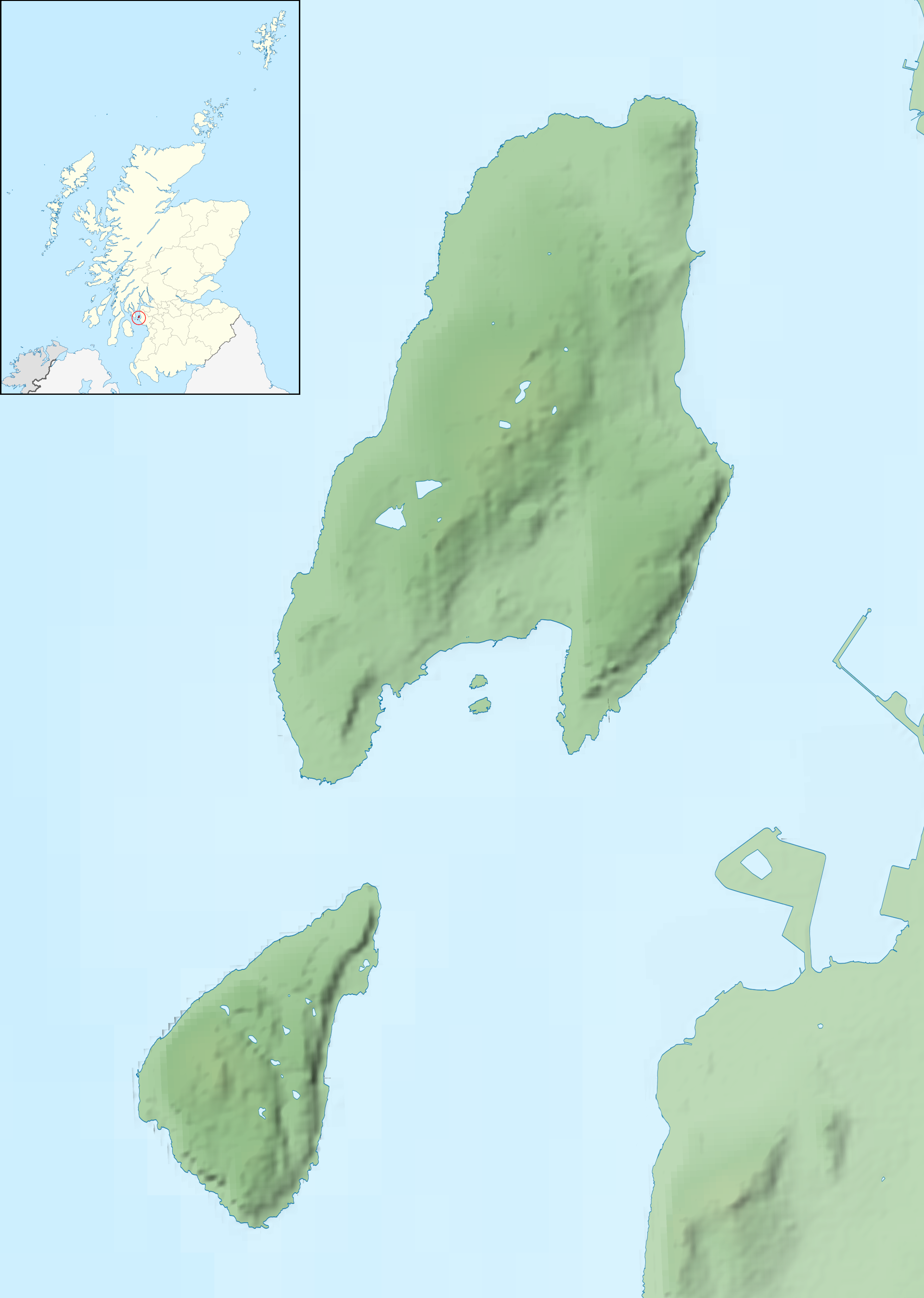
- Location within the Cumbraes
- Coordinates: 55.7203°N 4.941811°W

Site history
- Built: 16th century
- In use: Until 17th century
- Materials: Stone

Little Cumbrae Castle sits on Castle Island or Allin Tuirail from the Scottish Gaelic: eilean tùr nan uaislean meaning "islet of the nobles' tower", a small tidal island situated off the east coast of Little Cumbrae, in the Firth of Clyde. It is designated as a scheduled monument.

== History ==
Little Cumbrae was recorded as Kumbrey circa 1300, Cumbraye circa 1330 and Litill Comeray in 1515. The present small square castle of Little or Lesser Cumbrae was built by Lord Eglinton in the 16th century, possibly as a base to prevent deer and rabbit poaching; both animals being very common on the main island of Little Cumbrae at the time. The Hunters of Hunterston were for centuries the Hereditary Foresters of the island and King's lands of Little Cumbrae, however Hugh, Earl of Eglinton was made keeper of the island in 1515 because the Privy Council believed that Robert Hunter did not have the means to ...resist ye personis yat waistis the samyn without suple and help. This arrangement lasted for fifteen years and in 1527 Robert Hunter obtained a 'Royal Charter of the Island', but soon after the Crown sold it to the Earl of Eglinton, who in 1555 had his rights confirmed by James V.

Walter Stewart (1293–1326), who had married Marjorie Bruce, daughter of King Robert the Bruce, may have previously built a castle or hunting lodge here and his son, Robert II spent time here hunting the deer, however no local traditions about the site of the old castle have survived. The "Auld Castle" was occupied during hunting expeditions by Robert II in 1375 and 1384. King Robert III also visited Little Cumbrae Castle.

=== The proposed harbour ===
Robert Boyd of Badinhaith or Badenheath in Stirlingshire was the second son of Robert Boyd, 5th Lord Boyd and in 1599 resided in the castle and planned to encourage trade by building a harbour going so far as to obtain materials for the work, however at that time a number of families lived on Little Cumbrae and principle amongst them were several Montgomerys who did not wish to improve communications with the outside world. The island was at that time a refuge for "rebels, fugitives and ex-communicates" and the upshot was that the Montgomerys led some thirty men who broke down the doors to the castle, destroyed the materials intended for the harbour and smashed up the furniture, ousting Robert Boyd and occupying the castle. They seem to have escaped punishment and even given succour to other malefactors.

The small harbour at the Brigurd Point on the Hunterston Sands is said to have been used by the lairds for their journeys, etc. to Little Cumbrae.

=== Cromwell and King Charles II ===
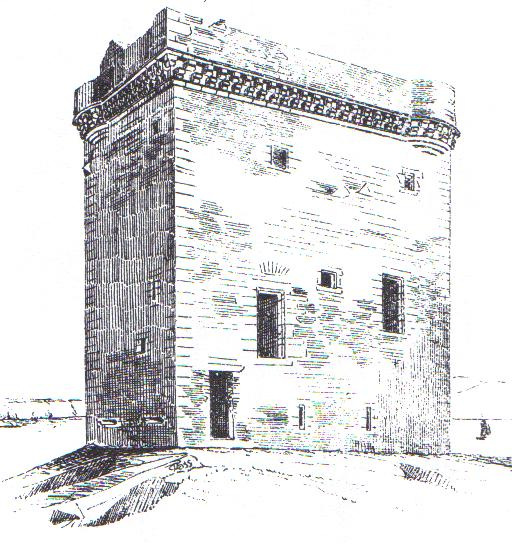
Little Cumbrae Castle.

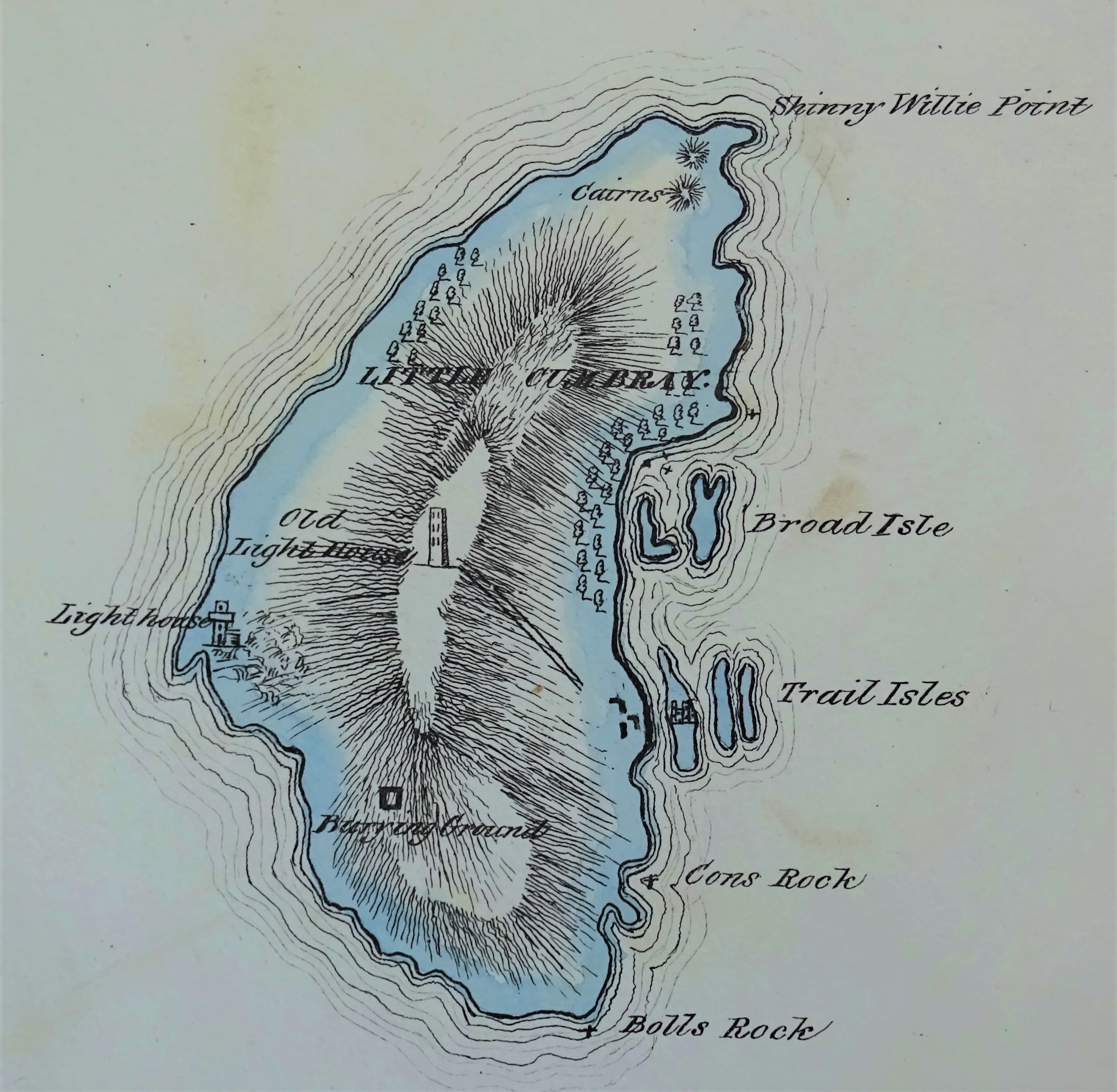
Little Cumbrae and the castle.

In Cromwell's time the then Earl of Eglinton dispatched his wife with a garrison of forty men at arms to this fortlet castle for her safe keeping; the defences were strengthened at this juncture. The Earl was taken prisoner after fighting against Cromwell at the Battle of Worcester (3 September 1651) and Lady Montgomerie was advised by the Marquis of Argyll to either offer the castle to the authorities or have it demolished once the munitions and cannons had been safely removed. Steele has it that the Earl himself took refuge at the castle when Cromwell's troops threatened Ardrossan Castle.

Principal Baillie of Glasgow fled here when Cromwell approached the city, leaving his family and belongings behind and lodging with Lady Montgomerie.

Archibald Hamilton was a friend and correspondent of Oliver Cromwell and was imprisoned in the dungeon at Little Cumbrae castle by the 6th Earl of Eglinton (died 1661) before being taken to Stirling where he was hanged.

The old Statistical Account indicates that this fortlet was taken by surprise and destroyed by Cromwellian forces, possibly in revenge for the role the castle played in the fate of Archibald Hamilton; after this it does not appear to have been restored or tenanted.

The inaccessibility of Little Cumbrae made it the principal stronghold of the Earl of Eglinton as Ardrossan Castle was vulnerable to artillery. In 1651 Charles II permitted: It is our pleasure the number of fortie men which the Lord Montgomerie hath raised and doeth maintaine in at the Isle of Comrie, may be allowed to him in this new levie for so many out of his owne or his fathers proper lands.

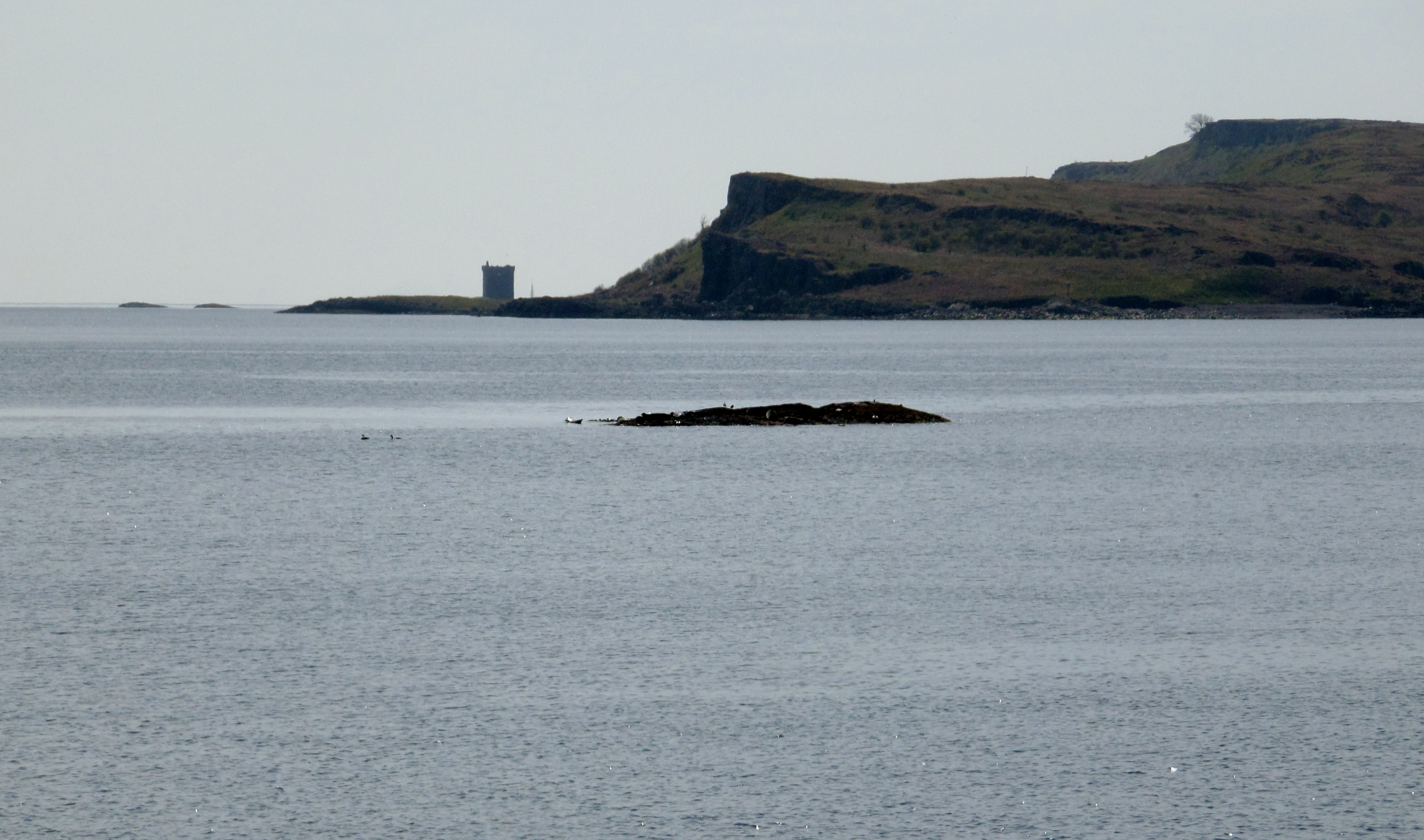
Little Cumbrae Castle and island from Millport.

In 1609 Robert Hunter was the subject of a complaint to the Privy Council made by the Captain of Dumbarton Castle for going to Little Cumbrae and taking all of the hawks away.

The name Cumbrae may derive from the Cymri or Kymry meaning 'fellow countrymen' or from Kil Maura meaning 'cell or church of a female saint'.

=== Modern history ===
The Normans introduced the rabbit to Scotland from Europe for their meat and fur; at first they were scarce and valuable as a novelty and they made good eating. They were either kept in warrens within stone walls or confined and protected on small islands, such as on Little Cumbrae. No contemporary Anglo-Saxon or Celtic word for rabbit therefore exists and no mention is made of them in the Domesday Book of 1086, also 'conyngis' (Scots) or 'coneys' was originally the name used for adults and the term 'rabbits' was only applied to the young.

The 6th Earl was a very keen huntsman and estate correspondence shows that he may have introduced deer from Ireland to Little Cumbrae in order to improve the stock.

The 15th Earl, George Montgomerie, introduced rabbits again in the 1850s and these bred so well as to become a pest. 5000 rabbits were being bred each year and the Earl rented out Little Cumbrae to shooting parties which provided a worthwhile income.

== Architecture ==
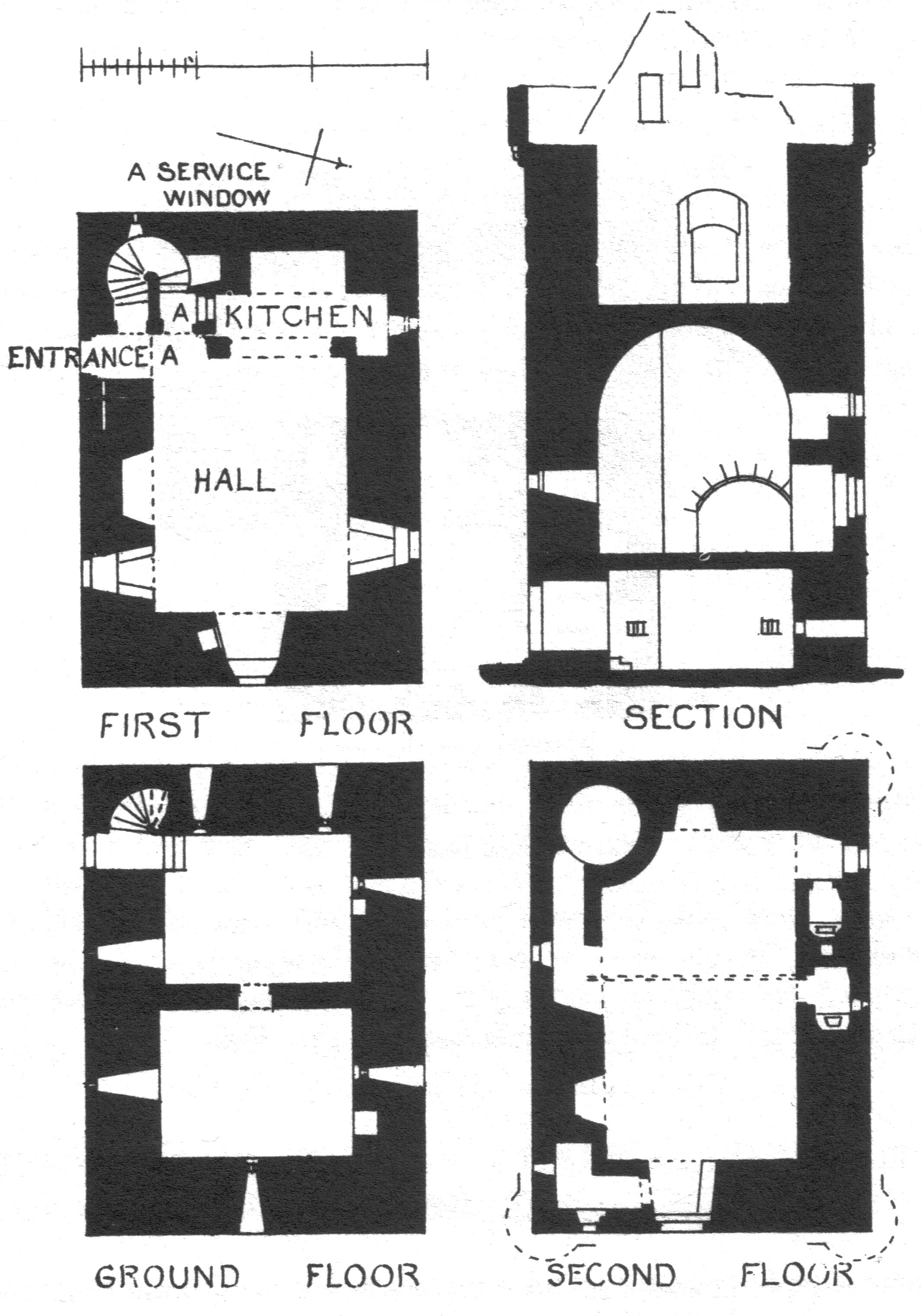
The floorplan of Little Cumbrae Castle.

This Category A listed building is strikingly similar to Fairlie Castle, Law and Skelmorlie Castles. The vaulted great hall was on the first floor, together with the kitchen, which were modern by the standards of the day. The entrance was via the first floor, an entrance to the ground floor being an apparent afterthought. The castle had two vaulted cellars. The tower had a typical continuous course of chequered corbelling and round angle turrets at three of the four corners. In 1568 George Elphinstoun, glasswright, was employed by the Earl of Eglinton to put glass windows into this 'Castle of Cumbrae'.

Tranter states that the castle (NS 152 513) was once surrounded by a rampart and ditch, and gives the date of the tower house as early 15th century. The castle had three main storeys, arrow slits and gunloops are present, the original windows were small and the first floor entrance would have originally been reached by a removable ladder, timber made.

The castle measures 12.5 metres (41 feet 0 inches) long, 9 m (29 ft 6 in) wide, and reaching 13.5 metres (44 feet 3 inches) to the wall-walk.

== Legends ==
The De'il's son is said in one local legend to have built Little Cumbrae castle, however the Old De'il was building a castle at Portencross and whilst sharing tools by throwing them across the firth, the only hammer was lost in the depths of the sea and the castles were left unfinished.

== See also ==
- Fairlie Castle
