= Forbflaith =

Given name

Forbflaith (later Farbhlaidh, Forbhlaith, or Forlaith) is an Irish and Scottish Gaelic feminine given name meaning "an overlord, ruler, sovereign". It was recorded in this form in 8th-century Ireland.

The Anglicized form Ferelith has been in rare use since the late 19th century (a prominent bearer being Lady Anne Ferelith Fenella Bowes-Lyon (1917–80), later Princess Anne of Denmark, a niece of Queen Elizabeth The Queen Mother).

== People ==
- Forbflaith ingin Connlai of Tethba, abbess of Clonburren, d. 775-780.
- Forbhlaith, Countess of Atholl (floruit 1247)

== See also ==
- List of Irish-language given names
