= Illinois's 6th House of Representatives district =

American legislative district

Illinois's 6th State House of Representatives district
Representative
Sonya Harper; D–Chicago
since 2015
- Demographics: 25.1% White; 37.1% Black; 27.3% Hispanic; 7.7% Asian; 0.1% Native American; 0.0% Hawaiian/Pacific Islander; 0.4% Other; 2.4% Multiracial
- Population (2020): 117,127
- Created: 1983–present 1849–1873, 1957–1973

Illinois's 6th House of Representatives district is a Representative district within the Illinois House of Representatives located in Cook County, Illinois. It has been represented by Democrat Sonya Harper since 2015. The district was previously represented by Democrat Esther Golar from 2005 to 2015.

The district covers parts of Chicago, and of Chicago's neighborhoods, it covers parts of Armour Square, Bridgeport, Chicago Lawn, Douglas, Englewood, Fuller Park, Grand Boulevard, Greater Grand Crossing, Loop, Near North Side, Near South Side, Near West Side, New City, and West Englewood.

== Representative district history ==
Prior to the ratification of the 1848 Illinois Constitution, counties (or two or more counties) were designated a certain number of Senators and Representatives. With the ratification of the 1848 Illinois Constitution, Legislative and Representative districts were numbered and called by name. Each district was still assigned a certain number of Senators and Representatives. After the passage of the 1872 Apportionment, only Legislative districts were drawn with Representatives elected cumulatively. The 1954 amendment to the 1870 Illinois Constitution established Representative districts as separate from Legislative districts (with representatives still elected cumulatively). The boundaries of Representative and Legislative districts would differ. After the United States Supreme Court ruled in Reynolds v. Sims (1964) that "both houses of state legislatures must be apportioned according to districts of equal population," new districts were redrawn for the Illinois Senate and Illinois House of Representatives. While the Legislative districts were redrawn, the Governor and General Assembly failed to agree on Representative district boundaries. Under the 1954 amendment, "a 10-man bipartisan commission appointed by the governor from recommendations made by both parties" were directed to redraw boundaries but failed to do so in 1963. Because of this failure, and with no district boundaries redrawn, all Representative districts were temporarily merged into one at-large district with 177 representatives (the total number of representatives at the time). The 1964 Illinois House election had several candidates running for all 177 seats throughout the state. In 1965, the Representative districts were redrawn by the Illinois Legislative Reapportionment Commission and elections held in 1966 were done with separate districts. With the 1971 Apportionment (and adoption of the 1970 Illinois Constitution), Representative districts were abolished and representatives were once again elected cumulatively per Legislative district. After the passage of the Cutback Amendment in 1980, the number of Representatives was reduced from 177 to 118 with Representative districts re-established and now electing a single representative.

== Prominent representatives ==
Representative	Notes
Zadok Casey	Elected the 4th Lieutenant Governor of Illinois (1830 – 1833); Elected to the U.S. House of Representatives from Illinois's 2nd congressional district (1833 – 1843); Elected 14th Speaker of the Illinois House of Representatives (1849 – 1851)
Isham N. Haynie	Served as a brigadier general during the Civil War (1861 – 1863)

== List of representatives ==
=== 1849 – 1855 ===
Representative	Party	Party Control	Years (Note: From 1870 to 1970, the GA met for a new session on the Wednesday after the first Monday of January.)	General Assembly (GA)	Electoral history	Counties represented
6th Representative district established electing 3 Representatives cumulatively with 1848 Illinois Constitution.
John A. Campbell	Democratic	3 Democrats	January 1, 1849 – January 6, 1851	16th	Elected in 1848; Was not re-elected in 1850.	Hamilton; Jefferson; Marion; Wayne
Zadok Casey	Democratic	3 Democrats	January 1, 1849 – January 3, 1853	16th 17th	Elected in 1848; Re-elected in 1850; Was not re-elected in 1852.	Hamilton; Jefferson; Marion; Wayne
James J. Richardson	Democratic	3 Democrats	January 1, 1849 – January 6, 1851	16th	Elected in 1848; Was not re-elected in 1850.	Hamilton; Jefferson; Marion; Wayne
William L. Gas	Unknown	2 Unknown; 1 Democrat	January 6, 1851 – January 3, 1853	17th	Elected in 1850; Was not re-elected in 1852.	Hamilton; Jefferson; Marion; Wayne
Isham N. Haynie	Unknown	2 Unknown; 1 Democrat	January 6, 1851 – January 3, 1853	17th	Elected in 1850; Was not re-elected in 1852.	Hamilton; Jefferson; Marion; Wayne
Alexander Campbell	Democratic	3 Democrats	January 3, 1853 – January 1, 1855	18th	Elected in 1852; Was not re-elected in 1854.	Hamilton; Jefferson; Marion; Wayne
John Wilbanks	Democratic	3 Democrats	January 3, 1853 – January 1, 1855	18th	Elected in 1852; Was not re-elected in 1854.	Hamilton; Jefferson; Marion; Wayne
John A. Wilson	Democratic	3 Democrats	January 3, 1853 – January 1, 1855	18th	Elected in 1852; Was not re-elected in 1854.	Hamilton; Jefferson; Marion; Wayne
Apportionment of 1854 redistricts the district and only 1 Representative is elected.

=== 1855 – 1873 ===
Representative	Party	Years	General Assembly (GA)	Electoral history	Counties represented
Apportionment of 1854 redistricts the district and only 1 Representative is elected.
James C. Holbrook	Republican	January 1, 1855 – January 5, 1857	19th	Elected in 1854; Was not re-elected in 1856.	Randolph
James H. Watt	Unknown	January 5, 1857 – January 3, 1859	20th	Elected in 1856; Was not re-elected in 1858.	Randolph
John E. Detrich	Democratic	January 3, 1859 – January 7, 1861	21st	Elected in 1858; Was not re-elected in 1860.	Randolph
Edmund Faherty	Unknown	January 7, 1861 – January 5, 1863	22nd	Elected in 1860; Was not re-elected in 1862.	Randolph
James M. Washburn	Unknown	January 5, 1863 – January 2, 1865	23rd	Elected in 1862; Was not re-elected in 1864.	Jackson; Williamson
William H. Logan	Democratic	January 2, 1865 – January 7, 1867	24th	Elected in 1864; Was not re-elected in 1866.	Jackson; Williamson
Hugh Gregg	Unknown	January 7, 1867 – January 4, 1869	25th	Elected in 1866; Was not re-elected in 1868.	Jackson; Williamson
Edward L. Denison	Republican	January 4, 1869 – January 4, 1871	26th	Elected in 1868; Was not re-elected in 1870.	Jackson; Williamson
William Schwartz	Republican	January 4, 1871 – January 8, 1873	27th	Elected in 1870; Was not re-elected in 1872.	Jackson
District abolished with 1872 Reapportionment as 3 Representatives were now elected cumulatively from Legislative districts.

=== 1957 – 1973 ===
Representative	Party	Party Control	Years (Note: Since 1970, the GA meets on the second Wednesday of January for a new session.)	General Assembly (GA)	Electoral history	Counties represented
District re-established in 1957.
John W. Carroll	Republican	2 Republicans; 1 Democrat	January 9, 1957 – January 6, 1965	70th 71st 72nd 73rd	Elected in 1956; Re-elected in 1958; Re-elected in 1960; Re-elected in 1962; Redistricted to At-large district and re-elected in 1964.	Cook
Arthur E. Simmons	Republican	2 Republicans; 1 Democrat	January 9, 1957 – January 6, 1965	70th 71st 72nd 73rd	Elected in 1956; Re-elected in 1958; Re-elected in 1960; Re-elected in 1962; Redistricted to At-large district and re-elected in 1964.	Cook
Thomas J. Halpin	Democratic	2 Republicans; 1 Democrat	January 9, 1957 – January 7, 1959	70th	Elected in 1956; Retired.	Cook
Bernard M. Peskin	Democratic	2 Republicans; 1 Democrat	January 7, 1959 – January 6, 1965	71st 72nd 73rd	Elected in 1958; Re-elected in 1960; Re-elected in 1962; Redistricted to At-large district and re-elected in 1964.	Cook
The district was temporarily abolished from 1965 to 1967 due to the Redistricting Commission in 1963 failing to reach an agreement. An at-large election was held electing 177 Representatives from across the state.
Marjorie Pebworth	Republican	2 Republicans; 1 Democrat	January 4, 1967 – January 8, 1969	75th	Redistricted from At-large district and re-elected in 1966; Retired.	Cook
Ralph A. Beezhold	Republican	2 Republicans; 1 Democrat	January 4, 1967 – January 8, 1969	75th	Elected in 1966; Lost renomination in 1968.	Cook
Harry Yourell	Democratic	2 Republicans; 1 Democrat	January 4, 1967 – January 10, 1973	75th 76th 77th	Elected in 1966; Re-elected in 1968; Re-elected in 1970; Redistricted to 8th Legislative district and re-elected in 1972.	Cook
Romie J. Palmer	Republican	2 Republicans; 1 Democrat	January 8, 1969 – January 10, 1973	76th 77th	Elected in 1968; Re-elected in 1970; Redistricted to 8th Legislative district and re-elected in 1972.	Cook
Edward L. Kipley, Sr.	Republican	2 Republicans; 1 Democrat	January 8, 1969 – January 10, 1973	76th 77th	Elected in 1968; Re-elected in 1970; Redistricted to 10th Legislative district and lost renomination in 1972.	Cook
District abolished with 1971 Reapportionment as Representatives were once again elected from Legislative districts.

=== 1983 – Present ===
Representative	Party	Years	General Assembly (GA)	Electoral history	Counties represented
District re-established with representatives now elected one per district with the passage of the Cutback Amendment
Bruce A. Farley	Democratic	January 12, 1983 – January 13, 1993	83rd 84th 85th 86th 87th	Redistricted from 14th Legislative district and re-elected in 1982; Re-elected in 1984; Re-elected in 1986; Re-elected in 1988; Re-elected in 1990; Ran for Illinois Senate in the 17th Legislative district and won in 1992.	Cook
Shirley M. Jones	Democratic	January 13, 1993 – January 8, 2003	88th 89th 90th 91st 92nd	Redistricted from 19th Representative district and re-elected in 1992; Re-elected in 1994; Re-elected in 1996; Re-elected in 1998; Re-elected in 2000; Retired.	Cook
Patricia Bailey	Democratic	January 8, 2003 – December 2005	93rd	Elected in 2002; Re-elected in 2004; Resigned during the 94th GA.	Cook
Patricia Bailey	Democratic	January 8, 2003 – December 2005	94th	Elected in 2002; Re-elected in 2004; Resigned during the 94th GA.	Cook
Vacant		December 2005	94th		Cook
Esther Golar	Democratic	December 2005 – September 21, 2015	94th	Appointed in 2005; Elected in 2006; Re-elected in 2008; Re-elected in 2010; Re-elected in 2012; Re-elected in 2014; Died.	Cook
Esther Golar	Democratic	December 2005 – September 21, 2015	95th 96th 97th 98th	Appointed in 2005; Elected in 2006; Re-elected in 2008; Re-elected in 2010; Re-elected in 2012; Re-elected in 2014; Died.	Cook
Esther Golar	Democratic	December 2005 – September 21, 2015	99th	Appointed in 2005; Elected in 2006; Re-elected in 2008; Re-elected in 2010; Re-elected in 2012; Re-elected in 2014; Died.	Cook
Vacant		September 21, 2015 – October 20, 2015	99th		Cook
Sonya Harper	Democratic	October 20, 2015 – Present	99th	Appointed in 2015; Elected in 2016; Re-elected in 2018; Re-elected in 2020; Re-elected in 2022	Cook
Sonya Harper	Democratic	October 20, 2015 – Present	100th 101st 102nd 103rd	Appointed in 2015; Elected in 2016; Re-elected in 2018; Re-elected in 2020; Re-elected in 2022	Cook

== Historic District Boundaries ==
Years	County	Municipalities/Townships	Notes
2013 – present	Cook	Chicago (Armour Square, Bridgeport, Chicago Lawn, Douglas, Englewood, Fuller Park, Grand Boulevard, Greater Grand Crossing, Loop, Near North Side, Near South Side, Near West Side, New City, and West Englewood)	
2003 – 2013	Cook	Chicago	
1993 – 2003	Cook	Chicago	
1983 – 1993	Cook	Chicago	
1967 – 1973	Cook	Calumet Township, parts of Stickney Township, parts of Thornton Township, and Worth Township	
1957 – 1965	Cook	Barrington Township, Elk Grove Township, Hanover Township, parts of Leyden Township, Maine Township, Niles Township, parts of Northfield Township, parts of Norwood Park Township, Palatine, Schaumburg Township, and Wheeling Township	
1871 – 1873	Jackson	Ava, Bradley, Carbondale, De Soto, Elkville, Fountain Bluff, Grand Tower, Makanda, Mt. Carbon, Murphysboro, Ora, Vergennes, Worthen, Worthington	
1863 – 1871	Jackson; Williamson	Bainbridge, Bolton, Bradley, Breesville, Brownsville, Carbondale, Crab Orchard, De Soto, Fredonia, Grand Tower, Jeffersonville, Locust Grove, Makanda, Marion, Mulberry Grove, Murphysboro, Sarahville, Sulphur Spa, Urlene, Vergennes,	
1855 – 1863	Randolph	Chester, Cobb, Coulterville, Eden, Georgetown, Jones Creek, Jordan Grove, Kaskaskia, Liberty, Prairie du Rocher, Prairieville, Preston, Randolph, Red Bud, Ruma, Sparta, Steels Mills, Steuben	
1849 – 1855	Hamilton; Jefferson; Marion; Wayne	Bear Creek, Burnt Prairie, Bussville, Enterprise, Fairfield, Fredericktown, Griswold, Hickory Hill, Horse Prairie, Jordans Prairie, Kendall, Mantua, Marge Grove, Maulding's Mills, McLeansboro, Moores Prairie, Mount Vernon, Mt. Zion, New Franklin, Oxford, Palo Alto, Raccoon, Salem, Spring Garden, Wabash, Walnut Hill	

== Electoral history ==
=== 2030 – 2022 ===
2022 Illinois House of Representatives election
Party	Candidate	Votes	%	±%
Democratic	Sonya Marie Harper (incumbent)	16,019	86.58	−13.42%
Republican	Leonard Griffin	2484	13.42	N/A
Total votes		18,503	100.0	

=== 2020 – 2012 ===
2020 Illinois House of Representatives election
Party	Candidate	Votes	%	±%
Democratic	Sonya Harper (incumbent)	32,219	100.0	N/A
Total votes		32,219	100.0	

2018 Illinois House of Representatives election
Party	Candidate	Votes	%	±%
Democratic	Sonya Harper (incumbent)	26,000	100.0	N/A
Total votes		26,000	100.0	

2016 Illinois House of Representatives election
Party	Candidate	Votes	%	±%
Democratic	Sonya Harper (incumbent)	32,904	100.0	N/A
Total votes		32,904	100.0	

2014 Illinois House of Representatives election
Party	Candidate	Votes	%	±%
Democratic	Esther Golar (incumbent)	19,159	100.0	N/A
Total votes		19,159	100.0	

2012 Illinois House of Representatives election
Party	Candidate	Votes	%	±%
Democratic	Esther Golar (incumbent)	31,283	100.0	N/A
Total votes		31,283	100.0	

=== 2010 – 2002 ===
2010 Illinois House of Representatives election
Party	Candidate	Votes	%	±%
Democratic	Esther Golar (incumbent)	14,920	100.0	N/A
Total votes		14,920	100.0	

2008 Illinois House of Representatives election
Party	Candidate	Votes	%	±%
Democratic	Esther Golar (incumbent)	22,395	100.0	N/A
Total votes		22,395	100.0	

2006 Illinois House of Representatives election
Party	Candidate	Votes	%	±%
Democratic	Esther Golar (incumbent)	16,793	100.0	N/A
Total votes		16,793	100.0	

2004 Illinois House of Representatives election
Party	Candidate	Votes	%	±%
Democratic	Patricia Bailey (incumbent)	23,445	100.0	N/A
Total votes		23,445	100.0	

2002 Illinois House of Representatives election
Party	Candidate	Votes	%	±%
Democratic	Patricia Bailey	17,234	100.0	N/A
Total votes		17,234	100.0	

=== 2000 – 1992 ===
2000 Illinois House of Representatives election
Party	Candidate	Votes	%	±%
Democratic	Shirley M. Jones (incumbent)	26,287	100.0	+14.84%
Total votes		26,287	100.0	

1998 Illinois House of Representatives election
Party	Candidate	Votes	%	±%
Democratic	Shirley M. Jones (incumbent)	19,183	85.16	−4.92%
Republican	Donald R. Oder	3,344	14.84	+4.92%
Total votes		22,527	100.0	

1996 Illinois House of Representatives election
Party	Candidate	Votes	%	±%
Democratic	Shirley M. Jones (incumbent)	25,328	90.08	−9.92%
Republican	Bobby Belk	2,790	9.92	N/A
Total votes		28,118	100.0	

1994 Illinois House of Representatives election
Party	Candidate	Votes	%	±%
Democratic	Shirley M. Jones (incumbent)	15,309	100.0	N/A
Total votes		15,309	100.0	

1992 Illinois House of Representatives election
Party	Candidate	Votes	%	±%
Democratic	Shirley M. Jones (incumbent)	28,012	100.0	+25.33%
Total votes		28,012	100.0	

=== 1990 – 1982 ===
1990 Illinois House of Representatives election
Party	Candidate	Votes	%	±%
Democratic	Bruce A. Farley (incumbent)	15,031	74.67	+9.46%
Republican	Terrence Melchiori	5,100	25.33	−9.46%
Total votes		20,131	100.0	

1988 Illinois House of Representatives election
Party	Candidate	Votes	%	±%
Democratic	Bruce A. Farley (incumbent)	19,327	65.21	+9.80%
Republican	Daniel J. Kelley	10,309	34.79	+4.79%
Total votes		29,636	100.0	

1986 Illinois House of Representatives election
Party	Candidate	Votes	%	±%
Democratic	Bruce A. Farley (incumbent)	13,135	55.41	−4.63%
Republican	Virginia V. Mann	7,112	30.00	−9.95%
Allin Walker Party	Allin Walker	3,457	14.58	N/A
Total votes		23,704	100.0	

1984 Illinois House of Representatives election
Party	Candidate	Votes	%	±%
Democratic	Bruce A. Farley (incumbent)	18,195	60.04	−39.96%
Republican	Virginia V. Mann	12,109	39.95	N/A
Write-in		3	0.01	N/A
Total votes		30,307	100.0	

1982 Illinois House of Representatives election
Party	Candidate	Votes	%
Democratic	Bruce A. Farley (incumbent)	23,162	100.0
Total votes		23,162	100.0

=== 1970 – 1962 ===
1970 Illinois House of Representatives election
Party	Candidate	Votes	%
Democratic	Harry "Bus" Yourell (incumbent)	68,221.5	30.78
Republican	Edward L. Kipley, Sr.	62,202	28.07
Republican	Romie J. Palmer (incumbent)	52,604	23.73
Democratic	Robert W. Carlson	38,600	17.42
Write-in		4	0.00
Total votes		221,631.5	100.0

1968 Illinois House of Representatives election
Party	Candidate	Votes	%
Republican	Romie J. Palmer	94,969	34.09
Republican	Edward L. Kipley, Sr.	74,746	26.83
Democratic	Harry "Bus" Yourell (incumbent)	67,448	24.21
Democratic	Joseph W. Quilici	41,430.5	14.87
Total votes		278,593.5	100.0

1968 Illinois House of Representatives Republican primary
Party	Candidate	Votes	%
Republican	Romie J. Palmer	14,271.5	50.56
Republican	Edward L. Kipley, Sr.	7,040	24.94
Republican	Ralph A. Beezhold (incumbent)	6,917	24.50
Total votes		28,228.5	100.0

1966 Illinois House of Representatives election
Party	Candidate	Votes	%
Republican	Marjorie Pebworth	75,003.5	34.05
Republican	Ralph A. Beezhold	64,453.5	29.26
Democratic	Harry (Bus) Yourell	49,201.5	22.33
Democratic	Salvatore D. Rende, Jr.	31,646.5	14.36
Total votes		220,305	100.0

1962 Illinois House of Representatives election
Party	Candidate	Votes	%
Republican	John W. Carroll (incumbent)	169,044.5	35.93
Republican	Arthur E. Simmons (incumbent)	151,458	32.19
Democratic	Bernard M. Peskin (incumbent)	88,585.5	18.83
Democratic	David V. Tarr	61,376.5	13.05
Total votes		470,464.5	100.0

=== 1960 – 1956 ===
1960 Illinois House of Representatives election
Party	Candidate	Votes	%
Republican	John W. Carroll (incumbent)	190,708.5	35.32
Republican	Arthur E. Simmons (incumbent)	159,076.5	29.46
Democratic	Bernard M. Peskin (incumbent)	107,029.75	19.82
Democratic	Marshall Keehn	83,149.25	15.40
Total votes		539,964	100.0

1958 Illinois House of Representatives election
Party	Candidate	Votes	%
Republican	Arthur E. Simmons (incumbent)	101,311	33.93
Republican	John W. Carroll (incumbent)	84,716.5	28.38
Democratic	Bernard M. Peskin	57,413.5	19.23
Democratic	Harry L. Kinser	55,111.5	18.46
Total votes		298,552.5	100.0

1956 Illinois House of Representatives election
Party	Candidate	Votes	%
Republican	John W. Carroll	133,862.5	37.39
Republican	Arthur E. Simmons	121,513	33.94
Democratic	Thomas J. Halpin	55,663.5	15.55
Democratic	Harry L. Kinser	46,944.5	13.11
Total votes		357,983.5	100.0
