= Farley (name) =

Farley is a family name and a given name. The patronymic surname is an anglicised form of the Irish patronyms Ó Faircheallaigh, which means "descendant of Faircheallach", whose name means "super war", and Ó Fearghail, which means "descendant of Fearghal", whose name means "man of valor". The toponymic surname comes from places with toponyms deriving from the Old English fearn, which means "fern", and leah, which means "woodland clearing".

== People with the family name ==
=== In public service ===
- Abraham Farley (c.1712–1791), English official, Chamberlain of the Exchequer
- Albert Farley Heard (1833–1890), American diplomat, co-founder of HSBC
- Allen Farley (born 1951), American politician, Alabama House of Representatives
- Bruce A. Farley (born 1943), American politician, Illinois House of Representatives
- Ephraim Wilder Farley (1817–1880), American politician, U.S. House of Representatives
- Sir Edwin Wood Thorp Farley (1864–1939), English politician, Mayor of Dover, Kent
- Florence Saunders Farley (1928–2022), American politician, Mayor of Petersburg, Virginia
- Frances Farley (1923–2004), American politician, Utah State Senate
- Frank S. Farley (1901–1977), American politician, New Jersey State Senate
- Hugh Farley (born 1932), American politician, New York State Senate
- James Aloysius Farley (1888–1976), American politician, U.S. Postmaster General
- James Indus Farley (1871–1948), American politician, U.S. House of Representatives
- James Lewis Farley (1823–1885), Irish diplomat, Consul for the Ottoman Empire
- James T. Farley (1829–1886), American politician, U.S. Senate
- John Farley (pilot) (1933–2018), English aviator, Order of the British Empire
- John H. Farley (1846–1922), American politician, Mayor of Cleveland, Ohio
- John J. Farley III (born c. 1942), American judge, U.S. Court of Appeals
- Joseph F. Farley (1889–1974), American admiral, Commandant of the U.S. Coast Guard
- Kai G. Farley (born 1973), Liberian politician, Superintendent of Grand Gedeh
- Leo J. Farley (1926–1984), American politician, Mayor of Lowell, Massachusetts
- Louis Farley (1860-1930), American politician, Mayor of Marlborough, Massachusetts
- Michael F. Farley (1863–1921), American politician, U.S. House of Representatives
- Nancy Farley Wood (1903–2003), American physicist, Manhattan Project, NASA
- Patricia Farley (born 1974), American politician, Nevada State Senate
- Reginald Farley (born 1961), Barbadian politician, President of the Senate of Barbados
- Reuben Farley (1826–1899), English politician, Mayor of West Bromwich, Sandwell
- Rick Farley (1952–2006), Australian politician, Council for Aboriginal Reconciliation
- Rusty Farley (1953–2011), American politician, Oklahoma House of Representatives
- Steve Farley (born 1962), American politician, Arizona State Senate
- Thomas Farley (physician) (born c. 1955), American doctor, New York City Health Commissioner
- Thomas T. Farley (1934–2010), American politician, Colorado House of Representatives
- Tricia Farley-Bouvier (born c. 1965), American politician, Massachusetts House of Representatives
- William Wallace Farley (1874–1952), American politician, Chair of the New York State Democratic Committee
- William Farley (Medal of Honor) (1835–1864), American sailor, Union Navy, Medal of Honor

=== Miscellaneous ===
- Alec Farley (1925–2010), English footballer, English Football League
- Andy Farley (born 1966 or 1967), hard house disc jockey
- Caleb Farley (born 1998), American footballer, National Football League
- Carole Farley (born c. 1955), American soprano, New York Metropolitan Opera
- Charles Farley (1771–1859), English actor, Covent Garden Theatre
- Chris Farley (1964–1997), American comedian, Saturday Night Live
- Christopher John Farley (born 1966), American journalist, The Wall Street Journal
- David Farley (born c. 1971), American journalist, The Wall Street Journal
- Dick Farley (born 1946), American footballer, College Football Hall of Fame
- Donald T. Farley (1933–2018), American professor, Cornell University
- Francis Farley (1920–2018), English physicist, Fellow of the Royal Society
- Harriet Farley (1812–1907), American abolitionist, Massachusetts Anti-Slavery Society
- Homa Vafaie Farley, Iranian-born potter and ceramist
- James Farley (actor) (1882–1947), American actor, Desert Law, The King of Kings
- Jim Farley (businessman) (born 1962), American businessman, CEO of the Ford Motor Company
- Jennifer Farley (born 1986), American actress known as JWoww, Jersey Shore
- Jerry Farley (born 1946), American professor, President of Washburn University
- John Murphy Farley (1842–1918), American cardinal, Archbishop of New York
- John P. Farley (born 1968), American actor, Second City Theatre
- John W. Farley (1948-2022), American professor, University of Nevada
- Katherine Farley (born c. 1950), American architect, Managing Director of Tishman Speyer
- Kenneth Farley (born 1964), American professor, California Institute of Technology
- Kevin Farley (born 1965), American actor, Second City Theatre
- Lawrence Farley (1856–1910), American baseball player, Major League Baseball
- Lilias Farley (1907–1989), Canadian painter, Canadian Centennial Medal
- Margaret A. Farley (born 1935), American professor, Yale University
- Marianne Farley (born c. 1979), Canadian actress, This Life, Imaginaerum
- Miriam S. Farley (1907–1975), American political scientist and editor
- Morgan Farley (1898–1988), American actor, Mercury Theatre on the Air
- Matthias Farley (born 1992), American footballer, National Football League
- Paul Farley (born 1965), English professor, Fellow of the Royal Society of Literature
- Patrick Farley (born c. 1978), American designer, pioneer of webcomics
- Roland Bo Farley (1907–1999), American footballer, East Carolina Pirates
- Silas Farley (born c. 1995), American dancer, New York City Ballet
- Terri Farley (born c. 1966), American author, The Phantom Stallion
- Thomas W. Farley (born 1975), American financier, CEO of the New York Stock Exchange
- Tim Farley (born 1962), American programmer, James Randi Educational Foundation
- Walter Farley (1915–1989), American author, The Black Stallion, The Black Stallion Returns
- William F. Farley (born 1942), American financier, co-owner of Chicago White Sox

== People with the given name ==
- Farley Drew Caminetti (1886–1945), American criminal, Caminetti v. United States
- Farley Flex (born c. 1962), British musician, Canadian Idol
- Farley Granger (1925–2011), American actor, Strangers on a Train
- Farley Katz (born 1984), American humorist, The New Yorker
- Jesse Farley Dyer (1877–1955), American marine, Medal of Honor
- John Farley Leith (1808–1887), English politician, Member of Parliament
- Farley Moody (1891–1918), American footballer, Alabama Crimson Tide
- Farley Mowat (1921–2014), Canadian novelist, Order of Canada
- Farley Norman (born 1961), American professor, Western Kentucky University
- Farley Vieira Rosa (born 1994), Brazilian footballer, Israeli Premier League
- Farley Santos, American politician from Connecticut
- Sir John Farley Spry (1910–1999), English judge, Chief Justice of Gibraltar
- Farley Keith Williams (born 1962), American musician, Trax Records

== Farley family of England ==
- Farley family (18th century), family of news media pioneers

== Senators Farley ==
- Senator Farley (disambiguation)

== Places with the name ==
- Farley (disambiguation)

== See also ==
- Farleigh (disambiguation)
- Fairlie (surname)
- Fairley
