= Farley Hill =

Farley Hill may be a reference to:

- Farley Hill, Saint Peter, Barbados, currently a national park in the parish of Saint Peter, Barbados
- Farley Hill, Luton, a ward and suburb in south Luton, Bedfordshire, England
- Farley Hill, Berkshire, a village in Berkshire, England

== See also ==
- Farley (disambiguation)
- Farley Hall (disambiguation)
- Farley Hills, a mountain range in Baker County, Oregon
- Farnley Hall (disambiguation)
