= Farnley =

Farnley may refer to:

== England ==
- Farnley, Leeds, a district in Leeds, West Yorkshire, which includes Old Farley and New Farnley
- Farnley, North Yorkshire, a village and civil parish in the Harrogate district of North Yorkshire
- Farnley and Wortley (ward), an electoral ward of Leeds City Council in west Leeds, West Yorkshire
- Farnley Tyas, West Yorkshire

== United States ==
- Farnley (White Post, Virginia), a property with two historic plantation houses

== See also ==
- Farley (disambiguation)
- Farnley Hall (disambiguation)
