= All Saints' Church, Farnley =

Church in North Yorkshire, England

Coordinates: 53°55′42″N 1°40′38″W

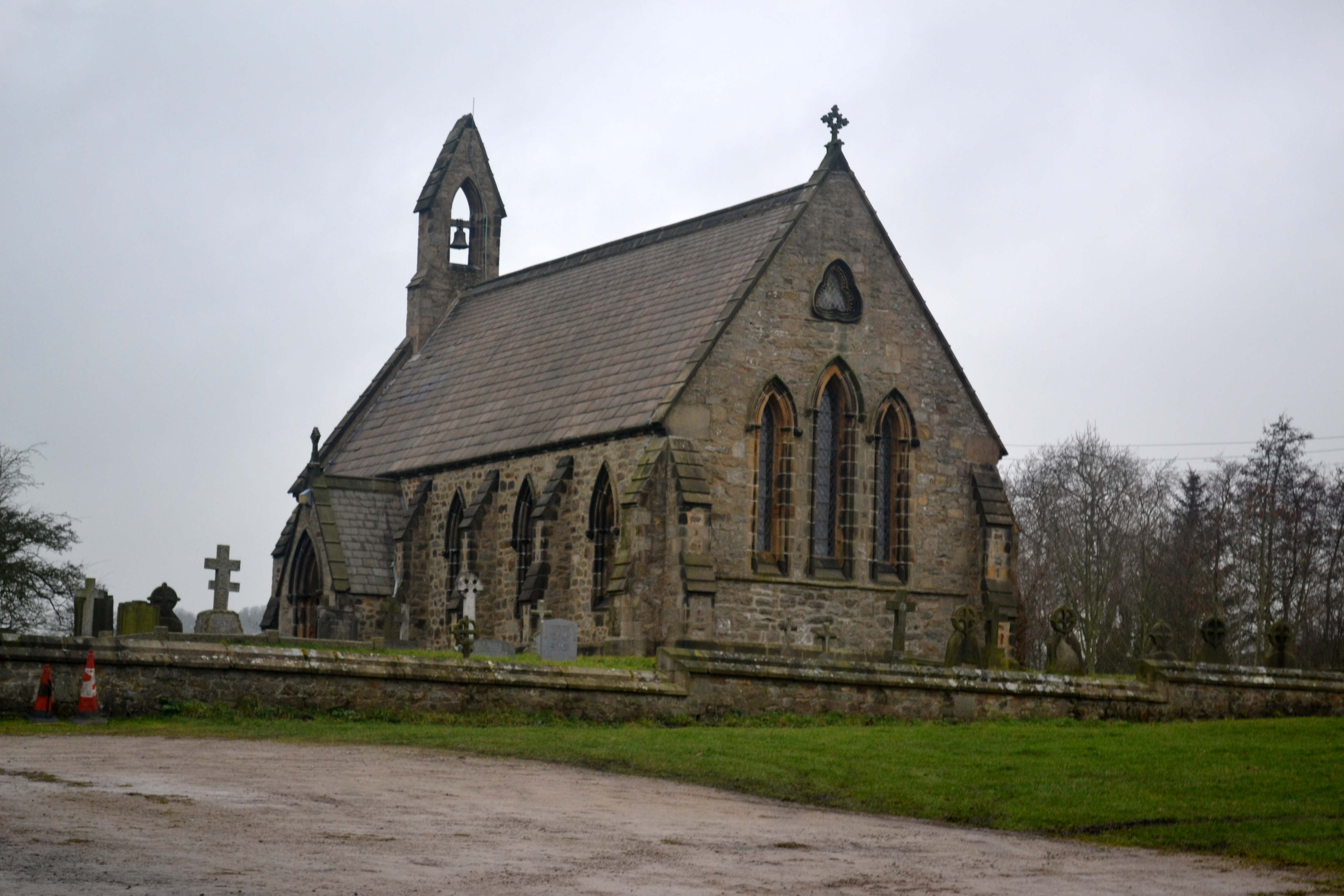
The church, in 2012

All Saints' Church is an Anglican church in Farnley, North Yorkshire, a village in England.

A church was built in Farnley in the 13th century, but at some point much of it was demolished, with the former chancel serving as a chapel. A new church was commissioned by Ayscough Fawkes, and was completed in 1851, reusing most of the walling from the chapel. The church was grade II listed in 1985.

The church is built of gritstone with a slate roof, and is in the Early English style. It consists of a nave and a chancel in one unit, a south porch, and a bellcote on the west gable. The windows are lancets. Some of the stained glass is 17th century and was designed by Henry Gyles. It was originally made for Hawksworth Hall, and was moved to Farnley Hall before being installed in the church. Inside the church, there is a west gallery with a vestry below, and the pews probably date from 1851.

== See also ==
- Listed buildings in Farnley, North Yorkshire
