= Farley family =

British family owning newspapers

- Members: Samuel Farley I Samuel Farley II; Edward Farley II; Felix Farley; Elizabeth Farley; Sarah Farley; Hester Farley

The Farley family pioneered news media in provincial England. In the 18th century, Samuel Farley I's Exeter Post Man emerged as the first weekly newspaper in Exeter, and as one of the first newspapers in provincial England, and in 1729, Edward Farley II was made a veritable martyr for press freedom when he died in gaol prior to his scheduled release on account of being pardoned for defying the British government's ban on Jacobite literature, and in 1731, Samuel Farley I won a case against the British government's attempted censorship, and the British government ceased intervention in provincial newspapers until 1736. In 1757, Elizabeth Farley was the first British journalist to be prosecuted for libel, and she defeated the prosecution.

== Origins ==
The Farley name is listed in the Domesday Book of 1086. Until 1695, the British government had prevented the establishment of printing presses in the provinces, and then the Licensing of the Press Act lapsed. In Freshest Advices: Early Provincial Newspapers in England, Professor R. M. Wiles recognises three newspapers as being “the pioneers in English provincial journalism”, namely the Norwich Post, of which the earliest extant issue is from 1707, and the Bristol Post Boy, of which the earliest extant issue is from 1704, and Samuel Farley I’s Exeter Post Man, of which the earliest extant issue is from 1711. The governing Whigs came to see provincial newspapers as auxiliaries of the Tory opposition in London, and in 1726, the Comptroller of the Post Office was mandated to institute surveillance, and from then on, all English, Irish and Scottish newspapers were to be purchased for examination by the Treasury Solicitor. Thus began the 'print wars' in which Edward Farley II was an early casualty.

== Samuel Farley ==
Samuel Farley I (c. 1675–1730) was the patriarch of the Farley family. He published the pioneering Exeter Post Man. He was also a founding publisher of Sam Farley's Bristol Post Man from 1715, and Farley's Bristol Newspaper from 1725. In 1716, he published the Jacobite Hague Letter in Farley's Bristol Newspaper, and he kept it in print despite the British government's orders for censorship of the letter. The British government lost the case for censorship in 1731, and the British government ceased further intervention in provincial newspapers until 1736.

== Samuel Farley II ==
Samuel Farley II (c. 1699–1753) was a son of Samuel Farley I. He was a founding publisher of Sam Farley's Bristol Journal, which was continued as Farley's Bristol Journal, and then as the Bristol Journal.

== Edward Farley II ==
Edward Farley II (c. 1705–1729) was a son of Samuel Farley I. In the 1720s, he published the Jacobite Persian Letter in Farley’s Bristol Newspaper, and he kept it in print despite the British government's orders for censorship of the letter, and he was imprisoned for high treason. He petitioned Queen Caroline for his release, and in turn the Attorney-General Philip Yorke, who became the 1st Earl of Hardwicke, issued a pardon for Edward Farley II, but he had an untimely death in gaol prior to his scheduled release.

== Felix Farley ==
Felix Farley (c. 1708–1753) was a son of Samuel Farley I. He was a founding publisher of Sam Farley's Bristol Journal, and Felix Farley's Bristol Journal, and Farley's Bristol Advertiser. Felix Farley's Bristol Journal was in print until 1853, when it was merged with the Bristol Times to form the Bristol Times and Journal, and in 1865, the Bristol Times and Journal was merged with the Bristol Mirror to form the Bristol Times and Mirror, and in 1932, the Bristol Times and Mirror was merged into the Bristol Evening World, and in 1949, the Bristol Evening World was merged into the Bristol Evening Post.

== Elizabeth Farley ==
Elizabeth Farley (c. 1710–1779) was the wife of Felix Farley. She was a publisher of Felix Farley's Bristol Journal from 1753 to 1774. In 1757, she was the first British journalist to be prosecuted for libel, and she defeated the prosecution.

== Sarah Farley ==
Sarah Farley (c. 1699–1774) was a granddaughter of Samuel Farley I. She was a publisher of the Bristol Journal.

== Hester Farley ==
Hester Farley (c. 1750–1806) was a daughter of Felix Farley and Elizabeth Farley. In 1775, she sold the Bristol Journal to George Routh and William Routh and Charles Nelson, and the Bristol Journal was continued as Sarah Farley's Bristol Journal.

== See also ==
- Freedom of the press
- Farley (disambiguation)
