= Katherine Porter (disambiguation) =

Katherine Porter (1940s–2024) was an American artist.

Katherine or Kate Porter could also refer to:

- Katherine Anne Porter (1890–1980), American novelist
- Katie Porter (born 1974), American lawyer and politician
- Kate Porter (born 1983), Australian rugby union player

== See also ==
- Catherine Porter (born 1965), American singer
- Catherine Porter (writer) (1898–1962), American writer and editor
