= Crane High School (Chicago) =

Crane Medical Prep High School

Location
- 2245 W. Jackson Blvd; Chicago, Illinois 60612; United States; 41.8768°N 87.6832°W

Information
- School type: Public Secondary Medical Prep
- Motto: Scientia Ac Labore
- Opened: 1890
- School district: Chicago Public Schools
- CEEB code: 140760
- Principal: Toya Murray
- Grades: 9–12
- Gender: Coed
- Enrollment: 481 (2015–16)
- Campus type: Urban
- Colors: Red; Blue; White
- Athletics conference: Chicago Public League
- Nickname: Cougars
- Accreditation: North Central Association of Colleges and Schools
- Yearbook: Science & Craft
- Website: newcranemedicalprep.org

Richard T. Crane Medical Prep High School (formerly known as Crane Tech Prep or Crane Tech High School) is a public four-year medical prep high school located in the Near West Side neighborhood of Chicago, Illinois, United States. The school is operated by the Chicago Public Schools district. Crane is named for businessman Richard T. Crane. Beginning with the 2012–13 school year, the school transitioned to a medical preparatory high school, partnering with Rush Hospital, City Colleges Of Chicago, and University of Illinois at Chicago.

== History ==
Crane was founded as a males-only school at 12th Street and Michigan Avenue in 1890. It was originally known as the English High and Manual Training School. In 1903, the school moved to its present location and was renamed in honor of businessman Richard T. Crane. When the school went co-ed in 1954, it began to de-emphasize its "technical" label, though it continued to offer courses like auto shop and drafting. Between 1911 and 1969, the school shared its building with Crane College, the first junior college in Chicago. The college moved out in 1969 and is now known as Malcolm X College. On November 30, 2011, Chicago Public Schools CEO Jean-Claude Brizard announced that Crane, along with several other schools, would either be closed or phased out. Under this plan, Crane would remain open but no longer accept freshman students, who would be routed instead to either Wells, Manley, Marshall, or Farragut. In April 2012, however, Brizard announced that Crane would be retained and redeveloped into a health sciences high school. Crane High School previously housed Chicago Talent Development Charter High School during the 2012–13 academic year, prior to Chicago Talent's closure the following year.

== Athletics ==
Crane became a charter member of the Chicago Public League in 1913. Since then, it has won eleven city titles in boys' basketball (1921, 1928, 1929, 1931, 1932, 1940, 1957, 1964, 1968, 1972, 2003). The school has produced a number of professional basketball players (see below).

== Notable alumni ==
- Berle Adams was a music executive and founder of Mercury Records
- Harry Aleman was a mobster and feared enforcer for the Chicago Outfit
- Tony Allen is a former NBA player
- Cory Blackwell is a former NBA player (1984–85), who played for the Seattle SuperSonics
- Milt Bocek was an MLB player (Chicago White Sox)
- Avery Brundage, Olympian and President of the International Olympic Committee from 1952 to 1972.
- Will Bynum (born 1983) was an NBA player and 2007 Israeli Basketball Premier League MVP
- Lou Chirban (1930–2008) was an MLB pitcher, one of the first five white players to join the Negro American League
- Sherron Collins played basketball for the University of Kansas
- Martin Cooper invented the handheld cell phone and made the first portable cellular phone call on April 3, 1973
- Chaz Ebert attorney and businesswoman. 1969 Crane High School graduate
- Milt Galatzer was an MLB player (Cleveland Indians, Cincinnati Reds)
- Charles M. Goodman, FAIA (1906–1992) was a master architect of modern architecture
- Robert F. "Ace" Gruenig (1913–1958) was a basketball player during the 1930s and 1940s. On August 11, 1963, Gruenig was enshrined in the Naismith Memorial Basketball Hall of Fame.
- George Halas was a professional football player, professional baseball player, coach, executive, and pioneer of the NFL. He led the Chicago Bears to six NFL championships, and was a charter member of the Pro Football Hall of Fame in 1963.
- Richard Hamming (1915–1998), was a computer pioneer in error correction code, mathematician on the Manhattan Project, and winner of Turing Award. He graduated from Crane in 1933.
- Walter J. Hamming (1911–1975), was a meteorologist for the Army Air Corp in World War II who supported the June 6, 1944 Normandy invasion and later worked for the Los Angeles Air Quality Management District where he established the chemical relationship of smog and automobile emissions and advocated automotive industry accountability.
- J. Allen Hynek was a professor of astronomy at Northwestern University. He was considered an expert on the subject of UFO phenomena. A former investigator for Project Blue Book, he invented the close encounter scale (first kind, second kind, third kind).
- Shirley M. Jones (1939–2016), Illinois state legislator
- John Kenerson was a professional football player
- Carol D. Lee is a professor, educational researcher, school director and author.
- LeRoy Martin, Chicago police officer who served as the second African-American superintendent of the Chicago Police Department (1987–1992).
- Joseph M. Mleziva, farmer and Wisconsin state legislatore
- Edward Nedza, Illinois state legislator and businessman
- Ken Norman is a former NBA forward (1987–97) who starred for the University of Illinois. He played most of his career with the Los Angeles Clippers, who drafted him in the first round of the 1987 NBA draft.
- Chris Pelekoudas was a Major League Baseball umpire
- Joe Reiff was a three-time All-American basketball player at Northwestern
- Wally Ris was a swimmer who won two gold medals at the 1948 Summer Olympics
- William "Bill" Shaw, politician, noted as the first African-American to serve as mayor of Dolton, Illinois
- Robert Shaw, politician
- Sam Sibert was a basketball player and second-round pick in 1972 NBA draft
- Lou Skizas is a former MLB player (New York Yankees, Kansas City Athletics, Detroit Tigers, Chicago White Sox)
- Sammy Skobel was a member of the Roller Derby Hall of Fame
- Anthony M. Trozzolo, chemist at the University of Notre Dame
- Andre Wakefield is a former NBA player (1978–80)
- Verdine White of Earth Wind and Fire group. 1969 Crane High School graduate
- Nobby Wirkowski was a professional football player, coach, and administrator in the Canadian Football League for a combined 17 years who later spent 25 years as the athletics director at York University, also becoming the first head coach of their football team.
- Philip Shapiro Lesly, class of 1936, was editor of the Crane student newspaper, then the only daily high school newspaper in the U.S. Went on to Northwestern (editor of Daily Northwestern) and then a long career as an author and public relations theorist. The Philip Lesly Co. was among the largest U.S. pr agencies in the 1960s and 1970s.
