= Farley Hall (disambiguation) =

Farley Hall may refer to:

- Farley Hall, Swallowfield is an 18th-century grade I listed country house in the English village of Farley Hill
- Farley Hall (University of Notre Dame), a residence hall at University of Notre Dame, South Bend, Indiana, U.S.

== See also ==
- Farley (disambiguation)
- Farley Hill (disambiguation)
- Farnley Hall (disambiguation)
