= Barack Obama Day =

Days honoring Barack Obama

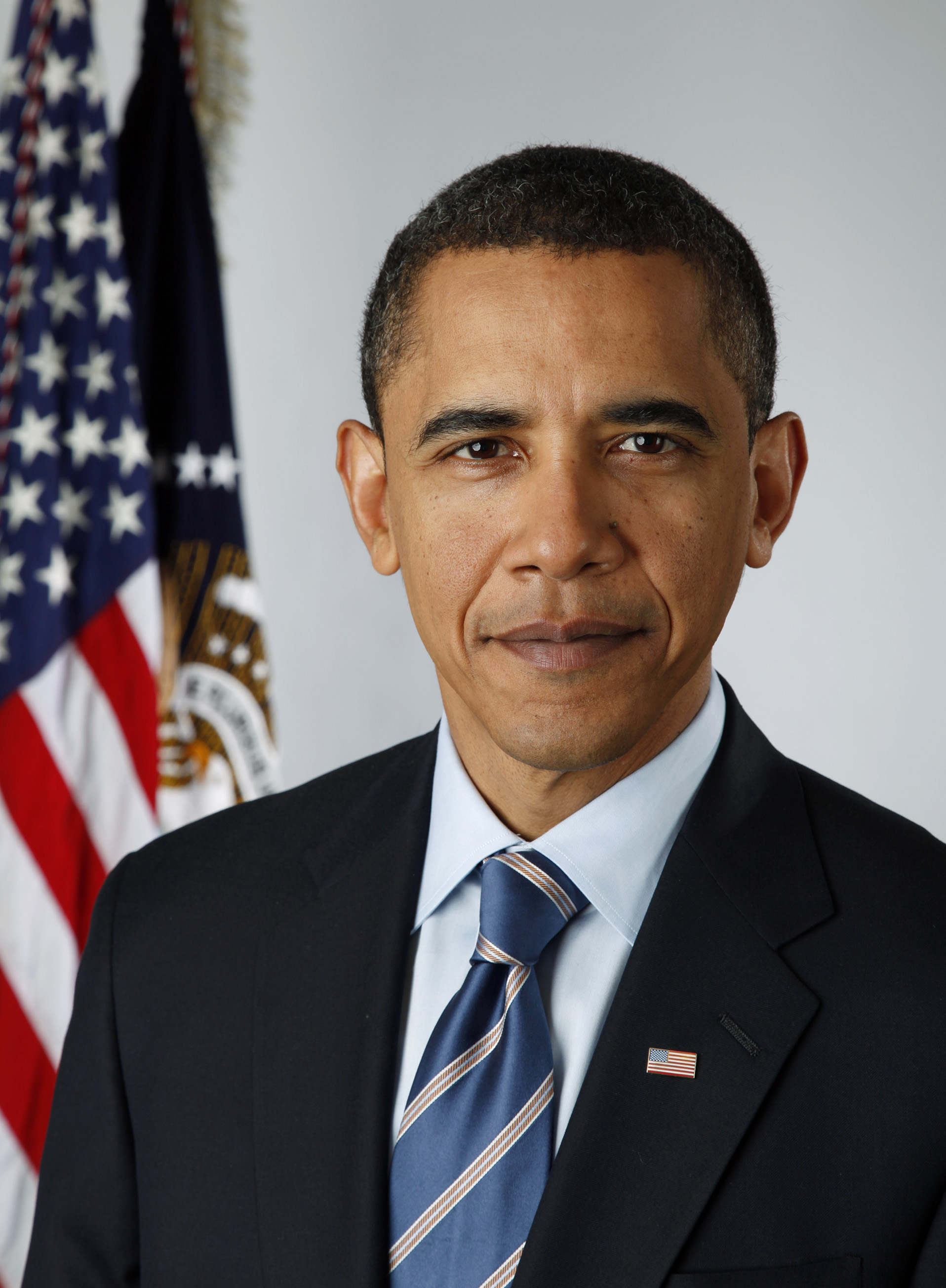
- President Obama
- Observed by: Illinois
- Type: Statewide
- Date: August 4 Second Monday of November (Perry County, Alabama) June 14
- Frequency: Annual

Barack Obama Day refers to three days of recognition in the United States in honor of Barack Obama, who served as the 44th President of the United States from 2009 to 2017.

Obama was a member of the Illinois Senate from 1997 to 2004 and represented the state in the United States Senate from 2005 to 2008 before becoming president. Illinois celebrates the day on August 4, Obama's birthday, each year. Similar to other commemorative holidays, it is not a legal state holiday, i.e. workplaces are not closed on the day.

Perry County, Alabama, has celebrated the second Monday of November as Barack Obama Day since 2009. County offices and schools are closed for the holiday.

Social media users celebrated Obama Day on June 14, 2020, posting pictures of the former president, with some using the hashtag #AllBirthdaysMatter in response to All Lives Matter, and again on June 14, 2025. June 14 is also Donald Trump's birthday.

== History ==
=== Alabama ===
The Perry County Commission approved a resolution sponsored by commissioner Albert Turner Jr. to establish Barack Obama Day by a vote four-to-one in 2008. The holiday was observed starting in 2009.

=== Illinois ===
In 2017, Illinois State Representatives André Thapedi and Sonya Harper introduced a bill to designate Barack Obama Day as a state holiday. The original measure would have closed state offices for the day. It was rejected by the House in March 2017, citing expense and the lack of a holiday for other presidents from Illinois such as Ronald Reagan.

That same year, State Senator Emil Jones III and others introduced Illinois Senate Bill 55, which designated August 4 as Barack Obama Day but did not make it an official state holiday. The bill passed both houses of the Illinois General Assembly with no votes against, and was signed into law by Illinois Governor Bruce Rauner on August 4, 2017. The bill amended the State Commemorative Dates Act to include a new section:

Barack Obama Day. August 4th of each year is designated as Barack Obama Day, to be observed throughout the State as a day set apart to honor the 44th President of the United States of America who began his career serving the People of Illinois in both the Illinois State Senate and the United States Senate, and dedicated his life to protecting the rights of Americans and building bridges across communities.

== Legislative history ==
Session	Short description	Synopsis as introduced	Bill number	Date introduced	Senate	Assembly	Governor	Sponsors
100th	Barack Obama Day	Amends the State Commemorative Dates Act. Provides that August 4 of each year is designated as Barack Obama Day.	SB 0055	Prefiled December 28, 2016	Passed the Senate 47–0	Passed the House 87–0	Signed into Law by the Governor on August 4, 2017	Senators Emil Jones III, Jacqueline Y. Collins, Patricia Van Pelt, Iris Y. Martinez, Mattie Hunter, Terry Link, and Donne E. Trotter; Representatives Marcus C. Evans Jr., Sonya M. Harper, Litesa E. Wallace, Carol Ammons, William Davis, Juliana Stratton, La Shawn K. Ford, Al Riley
