= St. Raphael Academy =

Saint Raphael Academy
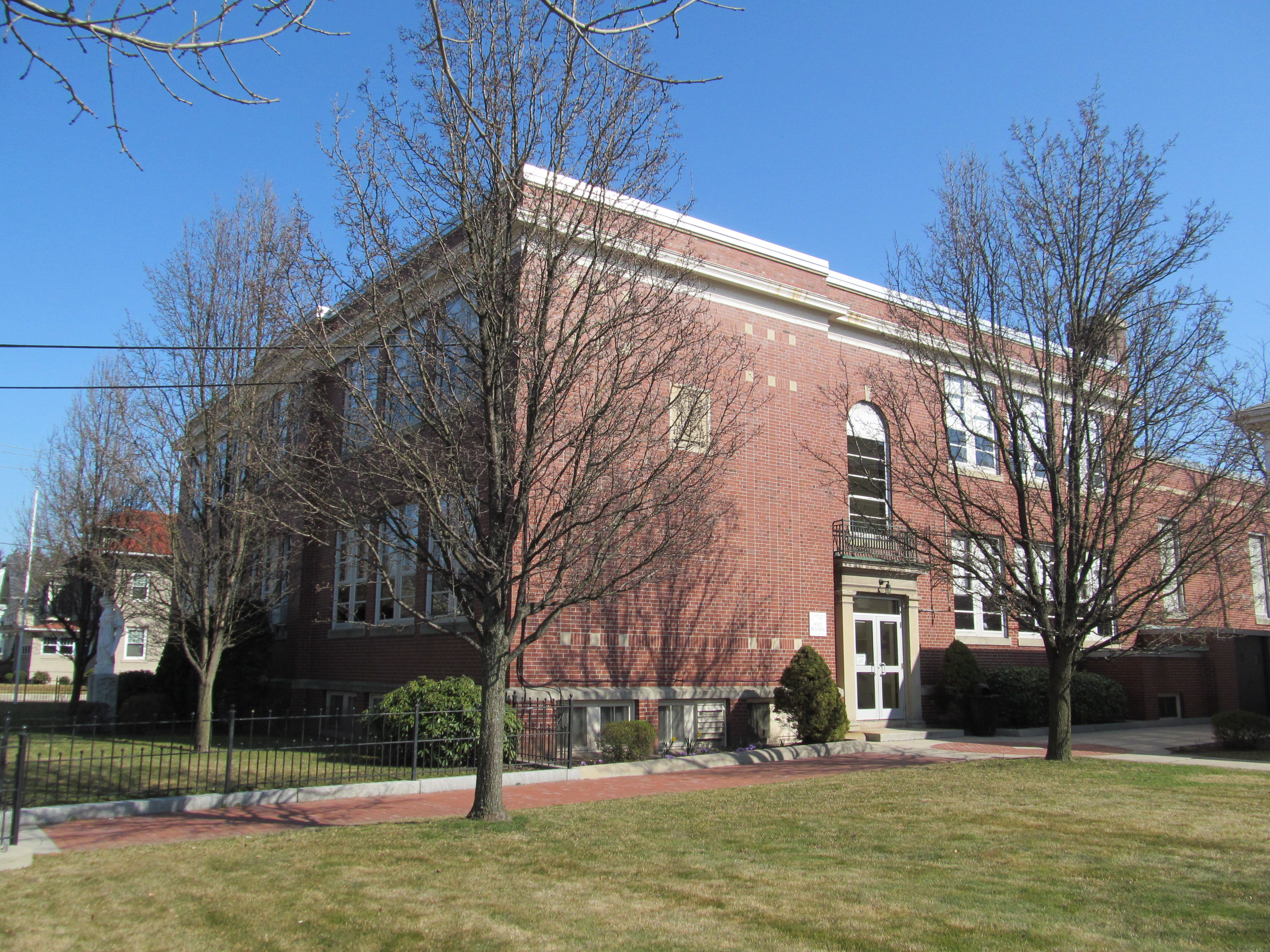
- St. Raphael Academy

Location
- 123 Walcott Street; Quality Hill; Pawtucket, (Providence County), Rhode Island 02860; United States; 41°52′37″N 71°22′36″W

Information
- Type: Private, Coeducational
- Motto: Signum Fidei (Sign of Faith)
- Religious affiliations: Roman Catholic, De La Salle Christian Brothers
- Established: 1924; 102 years ago
- Principal: Daniel Richard
- Grades: 9–12
- Colors: Purple and Gold
- Athletics conference: RIIL Division 1 North
- Mascot: Fighting Saint
- Team name: Saints
- Accreditation: New England Association of Schools and Colleges
- Yearbook: Raphaelite
- Tuition: $13,650
- Website: http://www.saintrays.org

Saint Raphael Academy (known colloquially as Saint Ray's, or simply, Saints) is a Roman Catholic, coeducational, college preparatory school in Pawtucket, Rhode Island, USA. It was founded in the tradition of Saint John Baptist de Lasalle and rooted in the Holy Gospel of Jesus Christ. It is located in the Roman Catholic Diocese of Providence.

== History ==
In 1922, Bishop William Hickey commenced a campaign to raise funds for the expansion of LaSalle as well as the construction of two new Catholic high schools, one in Pawtucket and the other in Newport.

By 1924, Bishop Hickey had raised the required funds and worked with the De La Salle Christian Brothers to open the two new secondary schools. The Pawtucket school was to be established in a large white mansion on Walcott Street that had been purchased from the Goff family for $95,000. An additional $60,000 was required to transform the residential building into appropriate classroom, library, and science lab space.

When Brother Anselm Moore, F.S.C., arrived in Pawtucket in late August 1924, work was just beginning on the transformation. Brother Anselm worked 12-hour days for weeks overseeing the construction and enrolling new students.

On September 10, 1924, the new Catholic high school on Walcott Street opened with 59 students, three faculty members, and an athletic director. On December 12, 1924, 17 pastors, representing the parishes that had students enrolled at the new school, met with Bishop Hickey and agreed that the name of the new institution should be Saint Raphael Academy.

It did not take long for the Academy to outgrow its facilities. Without a gymnasium or proper cafeteria space and faced with an overwhelming number of applications for admission, Brother Ambrose met with Bishop Hickey and in 1927 signed a contract for the construction of a new school building.

On January 1, 1929, the "new Saint Raphael Academy" was opened, featuring a gymnasium, six classrooms, a science lab, and a Principal's Office. In March 1929, nearly 1,000 people joined Bishop Hickey at the blessing the new facility. By the time the new building opened, the student body had grown to one hundred sixty students overseen by eight faculty members.

By the 1970s, the enrollment at Catholic high schools had begun to decline and the condition of the Academy's facilities had deteriorated, forcing the tuition to rise. In September 1975, Brother Jerome Corrigan, Principal, accepted 112 young women from St. Jean Baptiste Academy, which had closed the previous summer. In order to accommodate the added enrollment, Brother Jerome worked out a lease agreement to use the former Saint Joseph's Elementary School.

The now coeducational Saint Raphael Academy had an enrollment of 550 students and tuition of $500 annually. Enrollment continued to increase through the late 1970s, exceeding 700 students by the mid-1980s. The large number of students, along with the lack of space for computers and the arts, led Brother William Kemmemer, F.S.C., Principal, to launch the Academy's first capital campaign to fund the construction of an addition to the West Campus. Barbara Farley Hall opened in 1986, featuring a computer center, music room, art room, and classroom with athletic facilities in the basement.

With tuition rising to over $3,500 annually and enrollment beginning to slide, in 1996, Brother Thomas Casey, F.S.C., Principal, along with the Academy's School Board, determined that building an endowment for tuition assistance, funding new technology initiatives, and constructing new science labs needed to become an immediate priority in order to ensure the school's long-term survival.

Saint Raphael alumni helped the academy raise over $5 million in pledges during its historic Creating a Future capital campaign. The infusion of much needed capital gave Saint Raphael the opportunity to greatly increase its technological capabilities, offer additional tuition assistance to families, provide funds for faculty enrichment opportunities, create a new Administration Center and the Healey Library Media Center, purchase the former Saint Joseph's Elementary School, landscape the West Campus, and reconstruct the science facilities.

In 2007, Alumni Hall was constructed on the site where once stood St. Joseph's Convent and the Father Barry CYO Center. In September 2007, St. Raphael Academy in Pawtucket, R.I. held the grand opening and dedication service for Alumni Hall, their new athletic and wellness center. That same year, the Saints' varsity football team won the Rhode Island Division 1 State Championship for the second time in school history, finishing with an undefeated 12–0 record.

In 2020, the first cluster of COVID-19 cases in Rhode Island originated from St. Raphael Academy students and faculty who had travelled to Italy.

== Alumni ==
- Wendy Carlos (Grammy Award-winning Composer)
- William F. Farley (Former CEO of Fruit of the Loom)
- Chris Iannetta (MLB Catcher, Colorado Rockies)
- Patrick Lynch (Rhode Island Attorney General)
- John F. McBurney III (Rhode Island Senator)
- Michael Seander (Hip hop Artist known as Mike Stud, former baseball player)
- T. J. Sorrentine (Basketball Coach, Brown University)
- Robert Weygand (Rhode Island Congressman & Lieutenant Governor)
- Tim White (WWE Ring Official)
- Jeff Xavier (Basketball Guard, UJAP Quimper 29)

== See also ==
- Catholic schools in the United States
- Lasallian educational institutions
- Higher education
- List of Rhode Island schools
- Parochial school
