= Farleigh =

Farleigh may refer to:

== Places ==
=== Australia ===
- Farleigh, Queensland

=== England ===
- Farleigh, Somerset
- Farleigh, Surrey
- Farleigh Wallop, Hampshire
- Farleigh School, Hampshire
- Farleigh Hungerford, Somerset
  - Farleigh House
  - Farleigh Hungerford Castle
- East Farleigh, Kent
- Monkton Farleigh, Wiltshire
- West Farleigh, Kent

=== South Africa ===
- Farleigh, Western Cape

== People with the surname ==
- John Farleigh (1900–1965), English wood-engraver
- John Farleigh (politician) (1861–1949), Australian politician
- Lynn Farleigh (born 1942), English actress
- Richard Farleigh (born 1960), Australian private investor

== Other uses ==
- Newbury Manor School, a special school formerly named Farleigh College

== See also ==
- Farley (disambiguation)
