= Senator Farley =

Senator Farley may refer to:

- Bruce A. Farley (born 1943), Illinois State Senate
- E. Wilder Farley (1817–1880), Maine State Senate
- Frances Farley (1923–2004), Utah State Senate
- Frank S. Farley (1901–1977), New Jersey State Senate
- Hugh Farley (born 1932), New York State Senate
- James T. Farley (1829–1886), U.S. Senator from California
- Patricia Farley (born 1974), Nevada State Senate
- Reginald Farley (born 1961), Senate of Barbados
- Steve Farley (born 1962), Arizona State Senate

== See also ==
- Isaac G. Farlee (1787–1855), New Jersey State Senate
