= Farley =

Farley may refer to:

== People ==
- Farley (name)

== Places ==
=== Antarctica ===
- Mount Farley
- Farley Massif

=== Australia ===
- Farley, New South Wales
- Farley railway station

=== England ===
- Farley, Derbyshire
- Farley, Staffordshire
- Farley, Surrey
- Farley, Wiltshire

=== United States ===
- Farley, Iowa
- Farley, Kentucky
- Farley, Missouri
- Farley, West Virginia
- Farley Township, Polk County, Minnesota
- Farley Hall (University of Notre Dame)
- Farley (Culpeper County, Virginia)
- Joseph M. Farley Nuclear Plant
- James A. Farley Building

== Arts and entertainment ==
- Farley (comic strip), a comic strip by Phil Frank in the San Francisco Chronicle
- Farley (Sesame Street), in Sesame Street
- Farley, a sheepdog in the comic strip For Better or For Worse

== Businesses ==
- Farley's, British food maker, now owned by Heinz
- Farley's & Sathers Candy Company, British confectionery maker, now owned by Ferrero Group
- Farley Boats, Texan boat manufacturer, retired in the mid-1970s
- Farley Industries, American private equity firm

== See also ==
- Farley Castle, Berkshire
- Farleigh Hungerford Castle, Somerset, sometimes known as Farley Castle
- Farley Hill (disambiguation)
- Farley file, a political data collection practice
