= Edward Nedza =

American businessman and politician (1927–2018)

Edward Albert Nedza (July 26, 1927 – January 24, 2018) was an American businessman and politician.

== Biography ==
Born in Chicago, Illinois, Nedza served in the United States Marine Corps in the South Pacific and China during World War II. He went to St. Francis of Assisi School and Crane Technical High School. Nedza also went to University of California, Nedza was a businessman.

From 1979 to 1987, Nedza served in the Illinois State Senate and was a Democrat. Nedza served as a member of the Illinois Pollution Control Board for 8 days from March 9, 1987, to March 16, 1987.

Later that year, Nedza was convicted in the United States District Court of tax fraud, racketeering, conspiracy, and extortion.

Nedza died on January 24, 2018.
