= Catherine Porter (writer) =

American writer

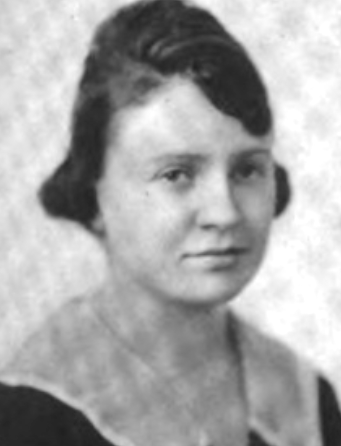
- Catherine Porter, from the 1919 yearbook of Cornell University
- Born: September 18, 1898; Holyoke, Massachusetts, U.S.
- Died: October 10, 1962 (aged 64); New York, New York, U.S.
- Occupations: Writer, editor

Catherine Lucy Porter (September 18, 1898 – October 10, 1962) was an American writer and editor. She was an expert on the Philippines with the Institute of Pacific Relations, where she edited Far Eastern Survey and was managing editor of the journal Pacific Affairs. She worked for the Office of War Information during World War II, and at the State Department after the war. She was on the staff of the Ethical Culture Society in her later years.

== Early life and education ==
Porter was born in Holyoke, Massachusetts, the daughter of John H. Porter and Alice Scully Porter. She graduated from Cornell University in 1919.

== Career ==
Porter taught high school English after college, and shorthand at a business school. She joined the American Council of the Institute of Pacific Relations in 1926, and specialized in research on the Philippines. She was managing editor of the journal Pacific Affairs, working with Owen Lattimore from 1935 to 1939, and editor of the Far Eastern Survey from 1940 to 1944, working with Miriam S. Farley.

Porter spoke on a 1941 radio program about the Philippines. She spoke to women's clubs and educational conferences in the United States and Canada in 1943, about the world's post-war prospects for peace and co-operation, saying "We must regard China as a neighbor... we must cultivate their friendship and understanding". She was a regional specialist at the Office of War Information in 1944 and 1945, during World War II, and as head of the State Department's Manila office after the war.

Porter was on the staff of the Ethical Culture Society beginning in 1953. She was especially involved in supporting the society's Encampment for Citizenship, an annual youth event held in California, New York, and Puerto Rico.

== Publications ==
- "Japan's 'Penetration' of Latin America" (1935)
- "Mineral Deficiency Versus Self-Sufficiency in Japan" (1936)
- "Philippine Rice Control Showing Results" (1938)
- "Philippine Industries Today and Tomorrow" (1938)
- "Steps Towards Economic Planning in the Philippines" (1938)
- "Philippine Independence in a Mineral-Conscious World" (1939)
- "The Philippines as an American Investment" (1940)
- "Japan in the Changing Philippine Scene" (1940)
- "Philippines Planning Big Rubber Development" (1940)
- "The Future of the Philippines" (1940)
- "Filipinization of Retail Trade Encounters Opposition" (1940)
- "Philippine Labor Policy in the Making" (1940)
- "Parties and Men in the Philippines" (1941)
- "Cooperation or Starvation in Luzon" (1942)
- Crisis in the Philippines (1942)
- "Autopsies on the Southeast Asia Debacle" (1943)
- "The Future of Philippine-American Relations" (1943)
- Filipinos and their Country (1944, pamphlet)
- "New Light on the Fall of the Philippines" (1954)

== Personal life ==
Porter died from cancer in 1962, at the age of 64, in New York City.
