= Anthony M. Trozzolo =

American chemist (1930–2026)

- Born: January 11, 1930; Chicago, Illinois, U.S.
- Died: July 1, 2026 (aged 96); Mishawaka, Indiana, U.S.
- Education: Illinois Institute of Technology; University of Chicago
- Occupation: Chemist
- Spouse: Doris Stoffregen (m. 1955; died 2011)

Anthony M. Trozzolo (January 11, 1930 – July 1, 2026) was an American chemist.

== Early life and career ==
Trozzolo was born in Chicago, Illinois, on January 11, 1930, the son of Pasquale and Francesca Trozzolo. He attended Crane Tech High School, graduating at the age of sixteen. After graduating, he attended the Illinois Institute of Technology, earning his BS degree in chemistry in 1950. He also attended the University of Chicago, earning his MS degree in 1957 and his PhD degree in 1960. He worked as a research chemist at Bell Labs in Murray Hill, New Jersey until 1975. During his time at Bell Labs, in 1963, he was named a fellow of the American Association for the Advancement of Science.

He served as a professor in the department of chemistry at the University of Notre Dame from 1975 to 1998. During his years as a professor, in 1975, he was named the Charles L. Huisking Professor of Chemistry. In 2011, he was named a fellow of the American Chemical Society.

== Personal life and death ==
In 1955, Trozzolo married Doris Stoffregen in Saint Peter, Minnesota. Their marriage lasted until her death in 2011.

Trozzolo died at the Saint Joseph Regional Medical Center in Mishawaka, Indiana, on July 1, 2026, at the age of 96.
