= Listed buildings in Farnley, North Yorkshire =

Farnley is a civil parish in the county of North Yorkshire, England. It contains 14 listed buildings that are recorded in the National Heritage List for England. Of these, one is listed at Grade I, the highest of the three grades, and the others are at Grade II, the lowest grade. The parish contains the village of Farnley and the surrounding countryside. The most important building in the parish is Farnley Hall, which is listed, together with associated buildings and structures in the grounds. The other listed buildings include a farmhouse, a former model farm, a church, a bridge and a drinking fountain.

== Key ==
Grade	Criteria
I	Buildings of exceptional interest, sometimes considered to be internationally important
II	Buildings of national importance and special interest

== Buildings ==
Name and location	Photograph	Date	Notes	Grade
Archway north of Farnley Hall; 53.92159°N 1.67373°W	—	1624	The archway is in gritstone, and has a shallow pointed arch with a moulded chamfered surround, and a dated lintel. It is flanked by fluted Tuscan columns on square bases with shallow recessed panels. Above is an entablature, and a cornice broken by a square limestone panel containing a coat of arms.	II
Outbuilding north of Farnley Hall; 53.92183°N 1.67411°W	—	Early 17th century	The outbuilding is in gritstone, with quoins, and a stone slate roof with coped gables and bulbous kneelers, on three sides. In the south front is a doorway with a fanlight under a round arch, and three of the sides contain mullioned or mullioned and transomed windows.	II
Farnley Hall; 53.92125°N 1.67381°W		17th century	A country house, to which a block designed by John Carr was added in 1786–90. The house is in stone, and has roofs of stone slate and lead. The original block, which has been altered, has two and three storeys and three bays. In the centre is a porch with Doric columns, an entablature, and a cornice, above which are elaborate scrolls and finials. Some windows are mullioned and transomed, and the others are later additions. The later block has two storeys and five bays, the middle bay canted, a sill band, a guilloché band, a dentilled cornice, and a balustraded parapet. In the centre is a doorway with engaged Tuscan columns, an entablature, and a triangular pediment. The windows are sashes; those in the ground floor of the central bay are round-headed.	I
Carr Side Farmhouse and outhouse 53.92794°N 1.69470°W	—	Late 17th to early 18th century	The house is in gritstone with quoins and a stone slate roof. There are two storeys, two bays, and a two-bay block at right angles on the left. The central doorway has an ogee-moulded lintel, and a datestone to the left. Most of the windows are mullioned.	II
Gate piers 120 metres northeast of Farnley Hall; 53.92227°N 1.67260°W	—	18th century	The gate piers flanking the driveway are in stone, with a square plan, and are about 3 metres (9.8 ft) high. Each pier has recessed panels, roll moulding, a plain entablature, a cornice, and cup and gadrooned cover finials.	II
Gate piers and gates 50 metres northeast of Farnley Hall; 53.92168°N 1.67326°W		18th century	There are two pairs of gate piers flanking the entrance to the drive, each in gritstone with a square plan. The inner piers are about 4 metres (13 ft) high and the outer piers about 2.5 metres (8 ft 2 in) high. Each pier has a chamfered plinth, a moulded collar, a deep cornice and a ball finial. The inner piers also have outer pilasters. The gates are in wrought iron.	II
Gates and gate piers, Farnley Lodge; 53.92291°N 1.67255°W		18th century	Flanking the entrance to the grounds are two pairs of gate piers and four gates. The gate piers are in stone with a square plan, and are about 3 metres (9.8 ft) high. The outer piers have chamfered rustication and pyramidal finials, and the inner piers have ball finials. The gates are in wrought iron, the inner ones with fleur de lis finials.	II
East Lodges, gates, gate piers and railings 53.91912°N 1.66280°W		Late 18th century	The two lodges flanking the entrance to the drive are in stone with Westmorland slate roofs. Each lodge has a single storey, a single bay, a moulded string course, a dentilled cornice, and a pedimented gable. The doorway and the windows, which are sashes, have moulded architraves, and the right lodge has a two-storey two-bay extension. The gate piers are square, in stone, and about 5 metres (16 ft) high. Each pier has a chamfered plinth, a moulded string course, a dentilled cornice, and a stepped cap with an eagle sculpture. The lodges and piers are linked by low walls with railings, and the gates are decorative.	II
Stables east of Farnley Hall; 53.92167°N 1.67249°W		Late 18th century	The stables, later used for other purposes, are in gritstone with quoins, and a Westmorland slate roof. There are three ranges around a courtyard, enclosed by a wall with gate piers on the south side. The north range contains a tall carriage arch, with three bays on its left, and a five-bay house with sash windows on the right. In the west range are four round-arched double carriage doors, and the east range contains garage doors, round-arched stable doors and windows, and a square hayloft opening.	II
Leathley Bridge; 53.91343°N 1.64951°W		Late 18th century	The bridge carries Farnley Park over the River Washburn. It is in stone, and consists of three arches, the middle arch taller. The bridge has pointed cutwaters, plain voussoirs, a projecting band, and a parapet with shallow pointed coping. Between the arches are shallow buttresses.	II
The Square; 53.92345°N 1.67152°W		Late 18th century	A model farm, later converted for other uses, in gritstone with quoins and a stone slate roof. There are three ranges forming a U-shaped plan around a courtyard, mainly with two storeys. The middle two bays of the north range have three storeys, and contain a central Venetian window in an arched recess. In the upper storeys are round-arched windows with impost bands. Between the windows are a blind round-arched opening, above which is a blind lunette with an architrave and a double keystone, and at the top is a cornice and a pyramidal roof surmounted by an arched cupola with a ball finial. The flanking bays contain houses. The west range contains carriage arches and cottages, and in the east range is a shop.	II
All Saints' Church; 53.92825°N 1.67717°W		1851	The church, which incorporates material from an earlier church on the site, is in gritstone with a slate roof, and is in Early English style. It consists of a nave and a chancel in one unit, a south porch, and a bellcote on the west gable. The windows are lancets.	II
Farnley Lodge; 53.92291°N 1.67240°W		Late 19th century	The lodge at the entrance to the drive is in gritstone and has a pyramidal stone slate roof. There is a single storey, a square plan, and two bays. The central doorway has a re-used ogee doorhead dated 1672, and is flanked by three-light double-chamfered mullioned windows with hood moulds.	II
Drinking fountain 53.92297°N 1.67252°W		1897	The drinking fountain, set into a wall adjacent to Farnley Lodge, celebrated the Diamond Jubilee of Queen Victoria. It is in stone, and has a semicircular bowl, a tap, and a bronze plaque framed by scalloped and foliated brackets supporting a round arch with an inscription.	II
