= Farnley Hall =

Farnley Hall may refer to the following stately places in England:

- Farnley Hall, North Yorkshire
- Farnley Hall, West Yorkshire
- Farnley Hall Park, a park in Farnley, Leeds

== See also ==
- Farley Hall (disambiguation)
- Farnley (disambiguation)
