= Chris Iannetta =

American baseball player (born 1983)

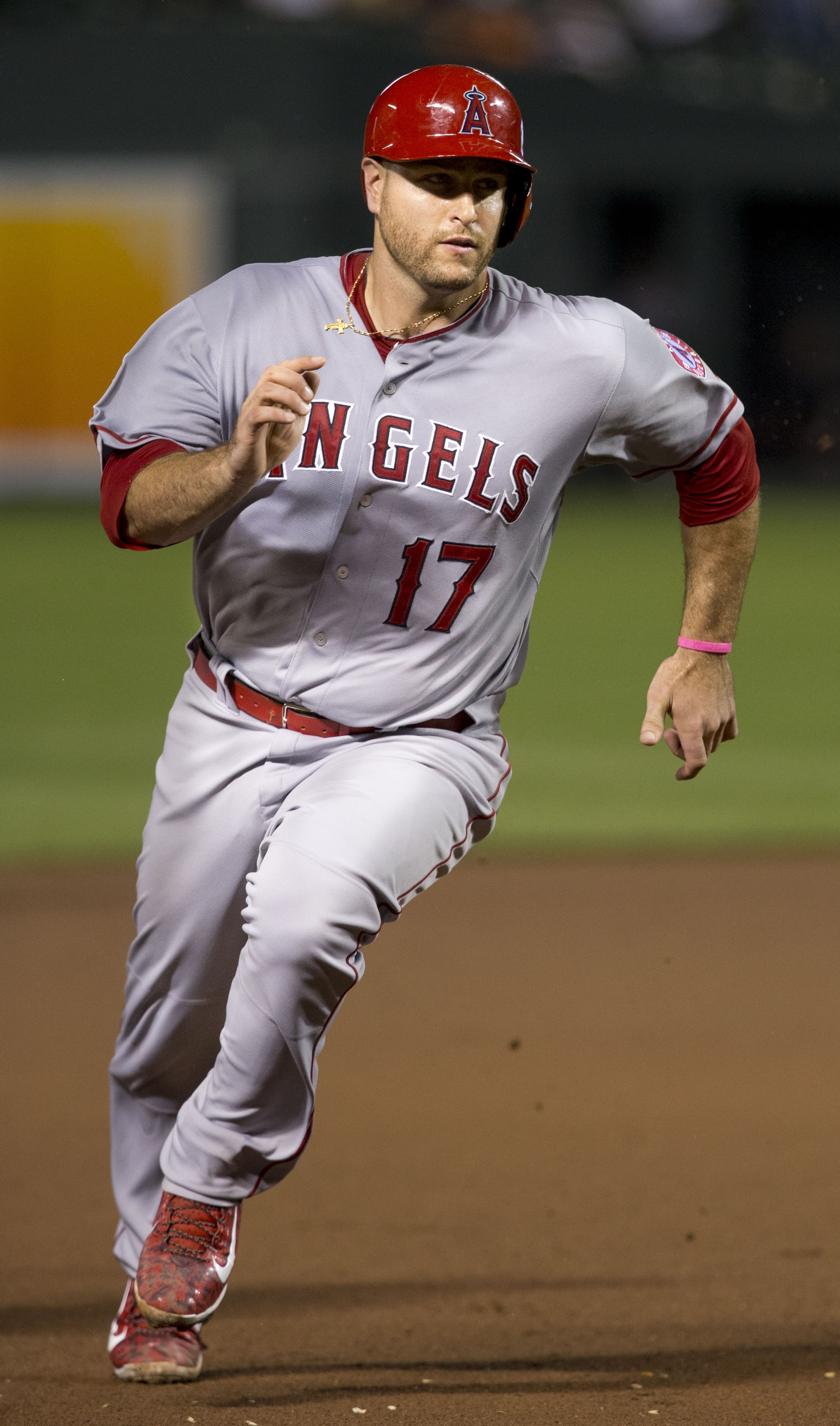
- Iannetta with the Los Angeles Angels
- Catcher
- Born: April 8, 1983 (age 43); Providence, Rhode Island, U.S.
- Batted: Right Threw: Right

MLB debut
- August 27, 2006, for the Colorado Rockies

Last MLB appearance
- August 10, 2019, for the Colorado Rockies

MLB statistics
- Batting average: .230
- Home runs: 141
- Runs batted in: 502
- Stats at Baseball Reference

Teams
- Colorado Rockies (2006–2011); Los Angeles Angels of Anaheim (2012–2015); Seattle Mariners (2016); Arizona Diamondbacks (2017); Colorado Rockies (2018–2019)

Christopher Domenic Iannetta (/ˌaɪ.əˈnɛtə/, Italian pronunciation: [janˈnetta]; born April 8, 1983) is an American former professional baseball catcher. He played in Major League Baseball (MLB) for the Colorado Rockies, Los Angeles Angels of Anaheim, Seattle Mariners, and Arizona Diamondbacks. He played in college for the North Carolina Tar Heels of the University of North Carolina at Chapel Hill. He stands 6 feet 0 inches (1.83 m) tall, and weighs 230 pounds (100 kg).

== Early life ==
Christopher Domenic Iannetta is the son of Maria (née DiLorenzo) and Domenic Iannetta. He is of Italian descent. His mother Maria was born in Casa Nova, Italy and his father Domenic was born in Scapoli, Italy. He has a younger brother Matt (born 1986).

He went to St. Ann School in Providence, Rhode Island, and attended St. Raphael Academy, a Roman Catholic high school in Pawtucket, Rhode Island. His jersey was retired there, where it is hung for all to see. He was awarded All-State honors on three consecutive occasions. He was awarded the C. Dona Manyard Award which is given to a male athlete who excels in the classroom and on the field. He graduated from St. Raphael Academy in 2001.

== Collegiate career ==
Iannetta attended the University of North Carolina, where he played college baseball for the North Carolina Tar Heels as a catcher and first baseman, while majoring in mathematics. As a sophomore in 2003, he finished fourth on the squad with a .319 batting average and ranked third with 55 runs batted in. Iannetta was named to the 2003 NCAA Starkville Regional All-Tournament Team after tallying five hits and four runs batted in during the Tar Heels' NCAA Tournament run. As a junior in 2004, he was selected as one of three finalists for the Johnny Bench Award, presented annually to the nation's top collegiate catcher. Iannetta was also named a third-team All-American by Collegiate Baseball Newspaper.

During his collegiate career, Iannetta played summer baseball in the Cape Cod League and the New England Collegiate Baseball League. His 2002 season with the Chatham A's of the Cape Cod League, led to him being featured in the book "The Last Best League: One Summer, One Season, One Dream" by Jim Collins. In his 2003 season with the Newport Gulls of the New England Collegiate Baseball League, Iannetta batted .302 with 20 runs batted in, and was selected to play in the NECBL All-Star Game. He was also named the league's Defensive Player of the Year.

== Professional career ==
=== Draft and minor leagues ===
The Colorado Rockies selected Iannetta in the fourth round of the 2004 MLB draft. He began his minor league career with the Asheville Tourists, and spent the 2005 season with the Modesto Nuts. He played the majority of the 2006 season with Double-A Tulsa Drillers before being promoted to the Triple-A Colorado Springs Sky Sox.

=== Colorado Rockies ===
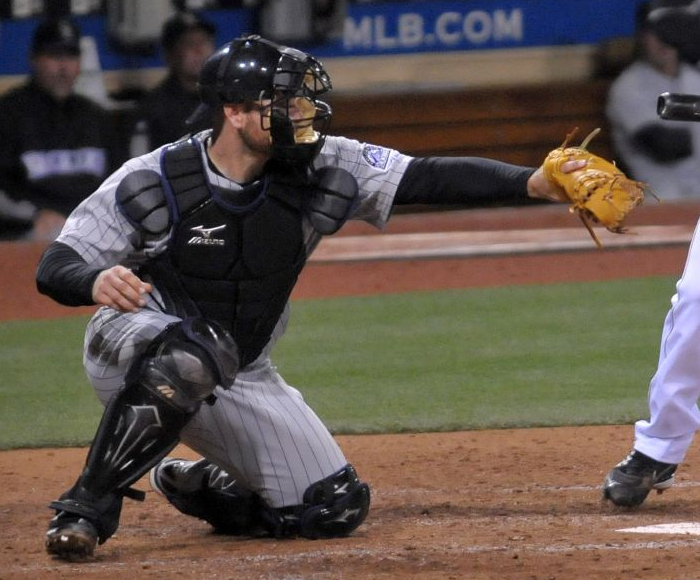
Iannetta playing for the Colorado Rockies in 2008

Iannetta made his MLB debut with the Rockies on August 27, 2006. Iannetta got his first career MLB hit that same day, off Jake Peavy of the San Diego Padres. He hit his first major league home run off Jonathan Sánchez of the San Francisco Giants. Iannetta played 21 games during 2006 with 2 home runs and 10 runs batted in.

In 2007, he was named the starting catcher coming out of spring training over Yorvit Torrealba, but struggled at the plate and was demoted to backing up Torrealba. Iannetta played in 67 games that year, with a .218 average, 4 home runs, and 27 runs batted in. Iannetta was part of the backup catcher's role as the Rockies went to the World Series for the first time ever but ended up losing the series to the Boston Red Sox in a 4-game sweep.

The 2008 year was a breakout season for Iannetta, in which he played 104 games batting .264 with 18 home runs and 65 runs batted in. In 2009, Iannetta played in 93 games batting .228 with 16 home runs and 52 runs batted in. In 2010, he played in 61 games batting .197 with 9 home runs and 27 runs batted in. In 2011, he played in 112 games batting .238 with 14 home runs and 55 runs batted in.

=== Los Angeles Angels of Anaheim ===
On November 30, 2011, Iannetta was traded to the Los Angeles Angels of Anaheim for pitcher Tyler Chatwood. On May 2, 2012, he caught Jered Weaver's first no-hitter. He finished the 2012 season playing 79 games with a .240 batting average, 9 home runs, and 26 runs batted in.

On October 5, 2012, the Angels and Iannetta agreed to terms on a three-year, $15.55 million deal.

=== Seattle Mariners ===
On November 23, 2015, Iannetta signed a one-year, $4.25 million deal with the Seattle Mariners.

=== Arizona Diamondbacks ===
On January 13, 2017, Iannetta signed a one-year, $1.5 million deal with the Arizona Diamondbacks.

On May 13, 2017, Iannetta was hit by a pitch from Johnny Barbato. Iannetta suffered a broken nose along with four fractured teeth, and required stitches on his lips.

=== Second stint with the Colorado Rockies ===
On December 8, 2017, the Rockies and Iannetta agreed to a two-year contract, bringing the catcher back to Colorado. On August 13, 2019, Iannetta was designated for assignment. He was released on August 15.

=== New York Yankees ===
On January 9, 2020, Iannetta agreed to a minor league contract with the New York Yankees. The deal was finalized on February 3. On July 21, 2020, Iannetta had his contract selected to the 40-man roster. On August 1, 2020, Iannetta was designated for assignment without appearing in a game for the Yankees. On August 8, Iannetta announced his retirement from professional baseball.

== International career ==
Iannetta was selected for Team USA at the 2009 World Baseball Classic.

== Personal life ==
Iannetta and his ex-wife Lisa were married in 2009 and have one daughter together. They live in Massachusetts, just past the Rhode Island border. Iannetta is married to Alanna Rizzo.
