= John Kenerson =

American gridiron football player (1938–1995)

No. 72, 74, 75, 76, 66
- Position: Defensive lineman

Personal information
- Born: March 18, 1938 (age 88); Chicago, Illinois, U.S.
- Died: December 6, 1995 (aged 57); Los Angeles, California, U.S.
- Listed height: 6 ft 3 in (1.91 m)
- Listed weight: 255 lb (116 kg)

Career information
- High school: Crane (Chicago)
- College: Kentucky State
- NFL draft: 1960: undrafted

Career history
- Los Angeles Rams (1960–1961); San Francisco 49ers (1962)*; Pittsburgh Steelers (1962); New York Titans (1962); Chicago Bears (1963)*; Ottawa Rough Riders (1963–1964); Montreal Alouettes (1965); Winnipeg Blue Bombers (1965)
- * Offseason or practice squad member only
- Stats at Pro Football Reference

John D. Kenerson (March 18, 1938 – December 6, 1995) was an American professional football player who was a defensive lineman in the National Football League (NFL), American Football League (AFL), and Canadian Football League (CFL) from 1960 to 1965. He played college football for the Kentucky State Thorobreds.

== Early life and college ==
Kenerson attended Crane High School in Chicago, Illinois. He played college football for the Kentucky State Thorobreds of Kentucky State University.

== Professional career ==
Kenerson played in seven games for the NFL's Los Angeles Rams in 1960. He was released by the Rams in late August 1962. Shortly thereafter, he was signed by the San Francisco 49ers of the NFL. He was released by the 49ers on September 4, 1962. He played in one game for the NFL's Pittsburgh Steelers in 1962. He was released by the Steelers on September 27. He had earlier been added to the team's active roster on September 21. He later joined the taxi squad of the New York Titans of the AFL. He was promoted to the Titans' active roster in late October 1962. He played in eight games for the Titans in 1962.

Kenerson signed with the CFL's Ottawa Rough Riders on September 5, 1963, after having recently been released by the NFL's Chicago Bears. He played in nine games for the Rough Riders in 1963 and played in 13 games for the team in 1964. In July 1965, following the Rough Riders' final exhibition game, Kenerson was released by the team. He then signed with the Montreal Alouettes of the CFL on August 3, 1956 and played in four games for the team during the 1965 season. He was released by the Alouettes in late August 1965 due to poor play. He signed with the Winnipeg Blue Bombers of the CFL on August 31, 1965 and played in one game for the team that season.
