= Chicago Talent Development High School =

Coordinates: 41.884241°N 87.729741°W

Chicago Talent Development Charter High School

Location
- 223 North Keeler Ave. Chicago, Illinois 60624; United States

Information
- Type: Public high school
- Established: 2009
- Closed: 2014
- School district: Chicago Public Schools
- Grades: 9-12
- Website: Official Site

The Chicago Talent Development High School was a public school in Chicago, Illinois. It was established in 2009, and closed at the end of the 2013–14 academic year.
