= Ralph A. Beezhold =

American businessman and politician

Ralph A. Beezhold (January 8, 1927 – August 3, 2007) was an American businessman and politician.

Born in Chicago, Illinois, Beezhold graduated from Chicago Christian High School. He took business administration and accounting classes in college. He served in the United States Naval Air Corps during World War II and the Korean War II. Beezhold was the owner of Oakton Appliance Service, Inc. He lived with his wife and family in Stickney Township, Cook County, Illinois. He served on the School Board District 11 and was involved with the Republican Party. Beezhold was also involved with the Pipe Fitters Association, AFL-CIO. Beezhold served in the Illinois House of Representatives in 1967 and 1968. Beezhold died in Florida.
