= Farley Norman =

Professor of psychological sciences

J. Farley Norman
- Born: James Farley Norman; July 19, 1961
- Education: University of Texas at Austin; Vanderbilt University
- Spouse: Hideko F. Norman
- Scientific career
- Fields: Psychophysics; Perception; Experimental psychology
- Thesis: The perception of curved surfaces defined by optical motion
- Website: https://people.wku.edu/farley.norman/

Farley Norman is a professor of psychological sciences at Western Kentucky University. He is a co-director of the Gustav Fechner Perception Laboratory at Western Kentucky University, along with his wife, Hideko Norman.

== Education ==
Norman spent a majority of his undergraduate years studying engineering and mathematics, but ultimately earned his B.A. in psychology from the University of Texas at Austin (1983). He then completed his Master's (1989) and Ph.D. (1990) in experimental psychology from Vanderbilt University under the mentorship of Joseph S. Lappin. He later became a post-doctoral fellow at Brandeis University and Ohio State University, where he was further trained as a research scientist by James T. Todd.

== Academic career ==
Norman began his professional academic career in 1996 at Western Kentucky University as a professor of psychology. He has taught a variety of courses, reflecting his interests in sensory and perceptual systems, psychopharmacology, history of psychology, and psychology and science fiction.

In addition to his role as professor, researcher, mentor, and advisor, Norman has served as the consulting editor of the journal Perception & Psychophysics.

== Research ==
Norman's research has encompassed a variety of topics in human perception, particularly the perception of distance, spatial relationships (e.g., exocentric and egocentric distances), motion, and the 3-dimensional shape of environmental objects. His laboratory studies both the visual and haptic perception of 3-D object shape, combining computer programming and psychophysical methodologies to investigate how human observers perceive 3-D shape.

One of the hallmark features of Norman's research has been his exploration of the visual and haptic perception of ecologically valid objects (i.e., those that occur naturally in the real world). In particular, he has used a variety of stimuli recreated from bell peppers (Capsicum annum) in the form of plastic casts as well as laser-scanned, 3-D computer models available for 3-D printing.

His research has also explored the effects of aging upon 3-D perception, with often encouraging results. Many of Norman's studies has demonstrated that older adults are able to effectively perceive many aspects of 3-D object shape well into their 70s and 80s (e.g.,).

Norman has authored over 100 peer-reviewed publications in scientific journals, as well as four book chapters (including chapters in Fechner's Legacy in Psychology and Neural Networks for Vision and Image Processing).

== Accomplishments ==
In 2005, Norman was awarded fellowship in the Association for Psychological Science (APS). He was one of the first to be admitted to this association when it first began in 1988, and is one of the founding members. In addition, he is a past member of the National Science Foundation (NSF) Perception, Action & Cognition Grant Review Panel.

Norman has been recognized for his research and teaching many times throughout his tenure at Western Kentucky University. Among these accolades are a University Award for Faculty Excellence in Research/Creativity (2000), College Award for Faculty Excellence in Research/Creativity (College of Education and Behavioral Sciences, 2006; 2010), and College Award for Faculty Excellence in Teaching (College of Education and Behavioral Sciences, 2008). Norman has been noted for his excellence in mentoring student research, having more than 170 student co-authorships on his published research articles. He has also mentored two recipients of the Barry M. Goldwater Scholarship. In 2018, one of his students, Lauren Pedersen was named as the only Goldwater Scholar in the state of Kentucky, and only of only 211 nationwide. In 2019, his student Sydney Wheeler was also recognized.

In 2011, he was named a University Distinguished Professor, the highest honor for Western Kentucky University faculty.
