= Harry Yourell =

American politician

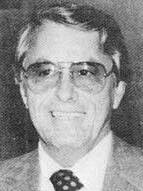
Official portrait, circa 1983

Harry "Bus" Yourell (February 19, 1919 – September 19, 2011) was an American politician.

Yourell was born in Hammond, Indiana on February 27, 1919. He attended high school in Chicago and La Salle Extension University. During World War II, he served in the United States Marine Corps and was awarded a Bronze Star and Purple Heart. After the war, Yourell moved to Oak Lawn, Illinois and opened Bus' Drive In. From 1959 to 1963 he served as a Trustee for the Village of Oak Lawn. He was involved with the Worth Township Regular Democratic Club and at the time of his election to the Illinois House of Representatives was the Democratic committeeman of Worth Township.

In 1966, Yourell was elected to the Illinois House of Representatives as one of three members from the 6th District. The district at that time included all of Worth Township and Calumet Township, and portions of Stickney and Thornton townships. During his time in the House, he was the Chair of the Joint Committee on Administrative Rules. The Cutback Amendment eliminated multi-member districts in favor of single member districts resulting in a large number of incumbent versus incumbent elections. In the 1982 general election, Yourell defeated Republican incumbent Herb Huskey. In 1983, Yourell was chosen to serve as the Democratic Caucus Chairman.

Yourell served as the Cook County Recorder of Deeds from 1984 to 1988. Yourell was elected a commissioner of the Metropolitan Water Reclamation District of Greater Chicago in 1988 and re-elected in 1994 and 2000. Yourell resigned from the Metropolitan Water Reclamation District of Greater Chicago on November 30, 2006. Yourell died at the Alexis Brothers Medical Center in Elk Grove Village, Illinois.

Yourell was active in the Democratic Party and served as involved with the Worth Township Regular Democratic Club. Yourell was the Democratic Committeeman of Worth Township at the time of his election to the Illinois House of Representatives. Yourell was a delegate to the Democratic National Convention in 1968, 1972, and 1976.

== See also ==
- 1984 Cook County, Illinois elections#Recorder of Deeds
