= Sonya Harper =

American politician

Member of the Illinois House of Representatives from the 6th district
- Incumbent
- Assumed office October 20, 2015
- Preceded by: Esther Golar

Personal details
- Party: Democratic
- Education: University of Missouri (BA)

Sonya Harper is an American politician who has served as a Democratic member of the Illinois House of Representatives for the 6th district since 2015.

== Biography ==
Harper received a BA in Journalism from University of Missouri in 2003. She has been the owner of Sharper Public Relations Communications since 2014.

=== Illinois House of Representatives ===
Since her October 20, 2015 appointment to replace the late Esther Golar, Harper has represented the Illinois's 6th House of Representatives district, which includes all or portions of Armour Square, Bridgeport, Chicago Lawn, Englewood, Gage Park, McKinley Park, New City, and West Englewood in the City of Chicago. Harper is the Joint Chair of the Illinois Legislative Black Caucus.

In 2017, Sonya Harper was named by J. B. Pritzker a member of the Pritzker's Agriculture Transition Committee.

As of July 2, 2022, Representative Harper is a member of the following Illinois House Committees:

- (Chairwoman of) Agriculture & Conservation Committee (HAGC)
- Appropriations - Public Safety Committee (HAPP)
- Economic Opportunity & Equity Committee (HECO)
- Elementary & Secondary Education: School Curriculum & Policies Committee (HELM)
- Energy & Environment Committee (HENG)
- Health Care Availability & Access Committee (HHCA)
- Revenue & Finance Committee (HREF)
- Sales, Amusement, & Other Taxes Subcommittee (HREF-SATX)

== Personal life ==
Harper is Catholic.

== Electoral history ==
Illinois 6th Representative District Democratic Primary, 2016
Party	Candidate	Votes	%
Democratic	Sonya Marie Harper (incumbent)	7,348	32.68
Democratic	Darryl D. Smith	5,585	24.84
Democratic	Genita C. Robinson	5,019	22.32
Democratic	Kenyatta Nicole Vaughn	4,530	20.15
Total votes		22,482	100.0

Illinois 6th Representative District General Election, 2016
Party	Candidate	Votes	%
Democratic	Sonya Marie Harper (incumbent)	32,904	100.0
Total votes		32,904	100.0

Illinois 6th Representative District General Election, 2018
Party	Candidate	Votes	%
Democratic	Sonya Marie Harper (incumbent)	26,000	100.0
Total votes		26,000	100.0

Illinois 6th Representative District General Election, 2020
Party	Candidate	Votes	%
Democratic	Sonya Marie Harper (incumbent)	32,219	100.0
Total votes		32,219	100.0

Illinois 6th Representative District Democratic Primary, 2022
Party	Candidate	Votes	%
Democratic	Sonya Marie Harper (incumbent)	5,055	71.68
Democratic	Carolynn Denise Crump	1,997	28.32
Total votes		7,052	100.0

Illinois 6th Representative District General Election, 2022
Party	Candidate	Votes	%
Democratic	Sonya Marie Harper (incumbent)	16,019	86.58
Republican	Leonard Griffin	2,484	13.42
Total votes		18,503	100.0
