= Farley railway station =

Former railway station in New South Wales, Australia

Farley
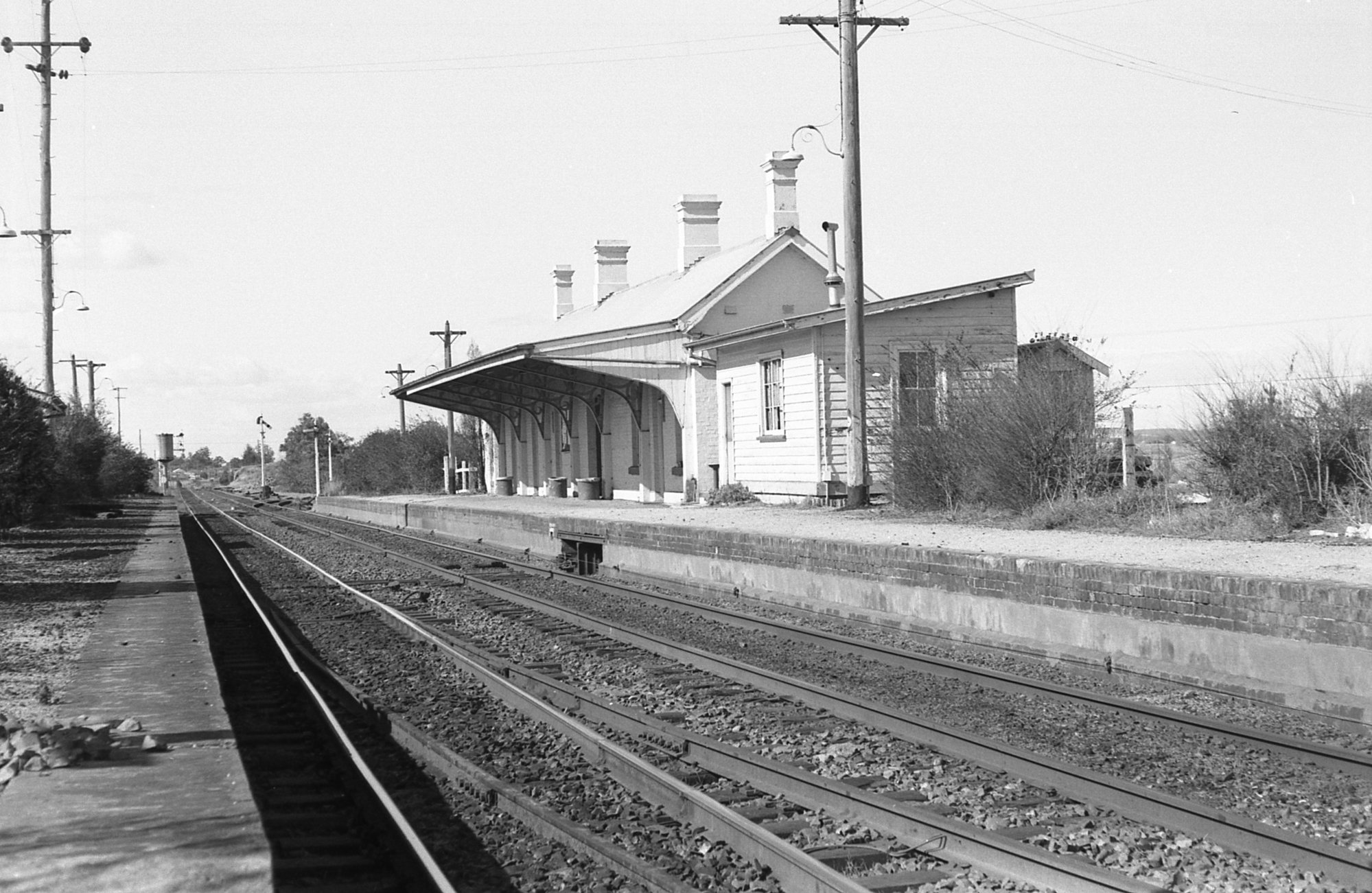
- Eastbound view showing station building before demolition

General information
- Location: Farley, Maitland, New South Wales
- Coordinates: 32°43′38″S 151°31′15″E
- Operator: Public Transport Commission
- Line: Main North
- Distance: 195.70 kilometres from Central
- Platforms: 2
- Tracks: 2

Construction
- Structure type: Ground

Other information
- Status: Demolished

History
- Opened: 2 July 1860
- Closed: 20 September 1975
- Former names: Wollombi Road (1860–1882)

Services
Preceding station	Former services	Following station
Lochinvar towards Wallangarra	Main Northern Line	Maitland towards Sydney
Location

Farley railway station was a railway station serving the former rural village of Farley on the Main North line in New South Wales. It opened on 2 July 1860 as Wollombi Road. The station consisted of two side platforms with a substantial station building. In 1882, it was renamed Farley. It closed to passenger services on 20 September 1975, and the disused station buildings were subsequently demolished.

== History ==
The Great Northern Railway line had until 1860, terminated at High Street railway station. This was extended on 2 July 1860 as far as Lochinvar railway station, including the opening of Wollombi Road on this same date. In 1882, Wollombi Road was renamed Farley to reflect the name of the nearby village. Originally only one platform, a second was added when the line was duplicated in 1914.

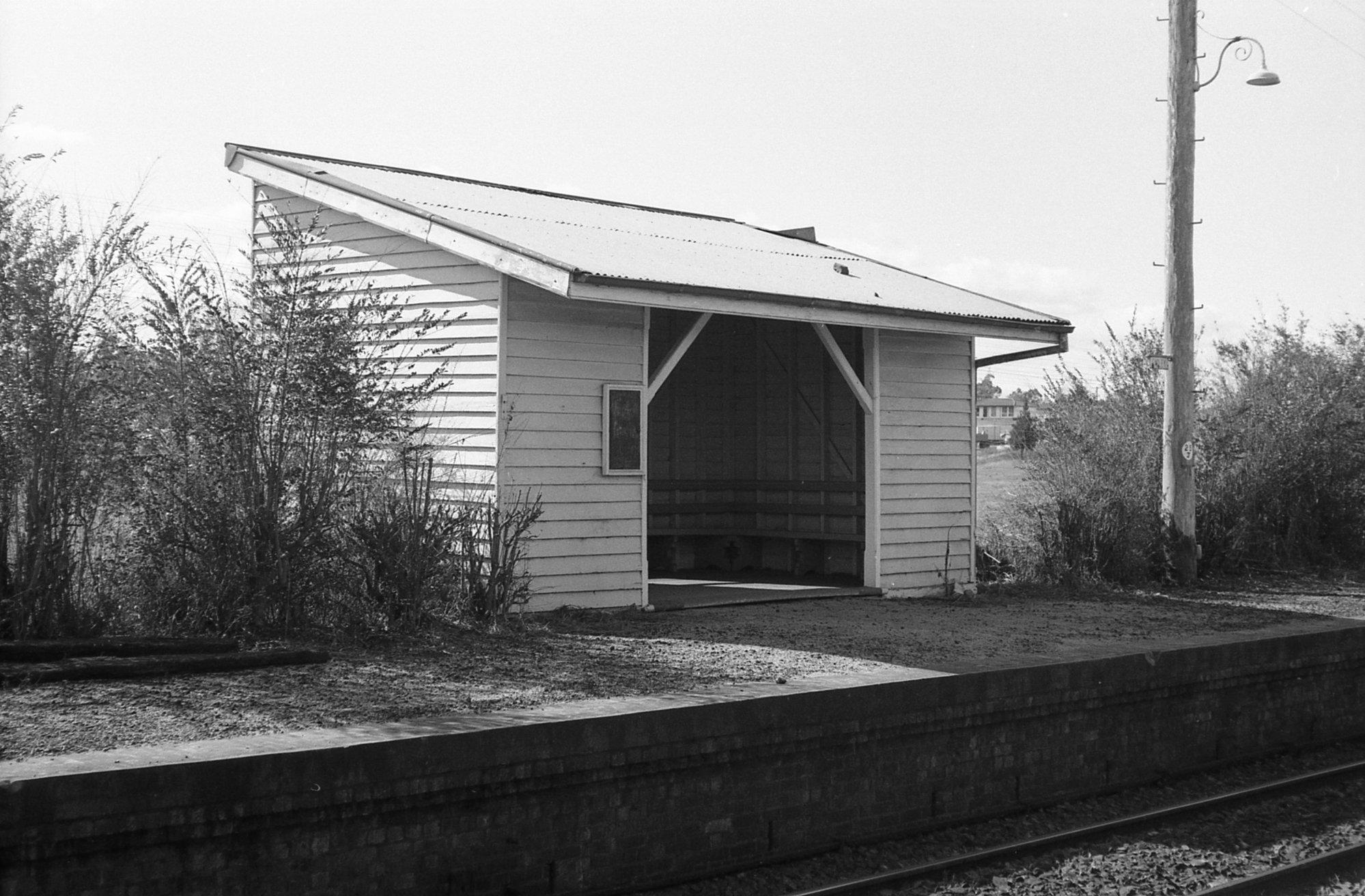
The shelter located on the up platform before demolition

On 8 March 1938, a night officer at the station, Cyril Clive Maher was shot through the head and killed by three teenagers, Thomas Gibson, Kemmell Coleman and William Date. A post-mortem revealed that the bullet had caused fragments of lead and bone to scatter throughout Maher's brain. The trio was subsequently arrested in relation to Maher's murder.

By the 1960s, patronage had significantly decreased, and the station was officially closed on 20 September 1975, before being demolished.

Between March 2011 and November 2012, the Minimbah to Maitland Third Track Project involved the disturbance and removal of the railway station remains in order to install a third track.

== Proposed reopening ==
In 2008, Save our Rails, a Newcastle rail lobby group, suggested opening a new railway station in the Farley area to improve rail access to Newcastle.
