= Farley Hills =

Mountain range in Oregon, United States

- Location within Oregon

Highest point
- Elevation: 1,226 m (4,022 ft)

Geography
- Country: United States
- State: Oregon
- District: Baker County
- Range coordinates: 44°57′54.523″N 117°48′13.779″W
- Topo map: USGS Magpie Peak

The Farley Hills are a mountain range in Baker County, Oregon.
