= Esther Golar =

American politician (1944–2015)

Member of the Illinois House of Representatives from the 6th district
- In office 2006–2015
- Preceded by: Patricia Bailey
- Succeeded by: Sonya Harper

Personal details
- Born: April 16, 1944 Merigold, Mississippi
- Died: September 21, 2015 (aged 71)
- Party: Democratic

Esther P. Golar (April 16, 1944 – September 21, 2015) was a Democratic member of the Illinois House of Representatives, representing the 6th District since her appointment in 2006. She served until her death on September 21, 2015.

== Early life ==
Born in Merigold, Mississippi, Golar moved with her family to Chicago, Illinois in 1950. She went to Crane Technical High School and Malcolm X College. Before her appointment to the Illinois General Assembly, Golar worked as a civilian employee of the Chicago Alternative Policing Strategy. She was also a board secretary of the Neighborhood Housing Services for nine years.

== State representative ==
Golar was appointed to her position as state representative after Patricia Bailey was forced to resign. Bailey was convicted for election fraud and perjury. Golar won election in her own right on November 7, 2006, and was thereafter reelected in 2008-2014 to successive terms in the Illinois House of Representatives.

As a member of the Illinois House of Representatives, Golar served on nine committees: Committee of the Whole; Appropriations-General Service; Judiciary II-Criminal Law; Child Support Enforcement; Tourism and Conventions; Veterans Affairs; Health Care Availability Access; Development Disabilities and Mental Illness; and Managing Sex Offender Issues. Her top issues were schools, crime, and healthcare. She lived in the New City community of Chicago from 1983 until her death. She was succeeded in the Illinois House by Sonya Harper.
