= Farley, West Virginia =

Unincorporated community in West Virginia, United States

- Unincorporated community
- Location within West Virginia Location within the United States
- Coordinates: 37°32′09″N 80°55′26″W
- Country: United States
- State: West Virginia
- County: Summers
- Elevation: 2,405 ft (733 m)
- Time zone: UTC-5 (Eastern (EST))
  - Summer (DST): UTC-4 (EDT)
- Area codes: 304 & 681
- GNIS feature ID: 1549679

Farley is an unincorporated community in Summers County, West Virginia, United States. Farley is near the New River, south of Hinton.
