= Romie J. Palmer =

American politician

Romie J. Palmer (April 10, 1921 – December 16, 2014) was an American politician and jurist.

Born in Pontotoc, Mississippi, Palmer served in the United States Army during World War II. He received his law degree from DePaul University College of Law and practiced law in Blue Island, Illinois. Palmer served in the Illinois House of Representatives from 1969 to 1976 and was a Republican. He then served as judge of the Cook County, Illinois Circuit Court.
