= Jerry Farley =

American academic administrator

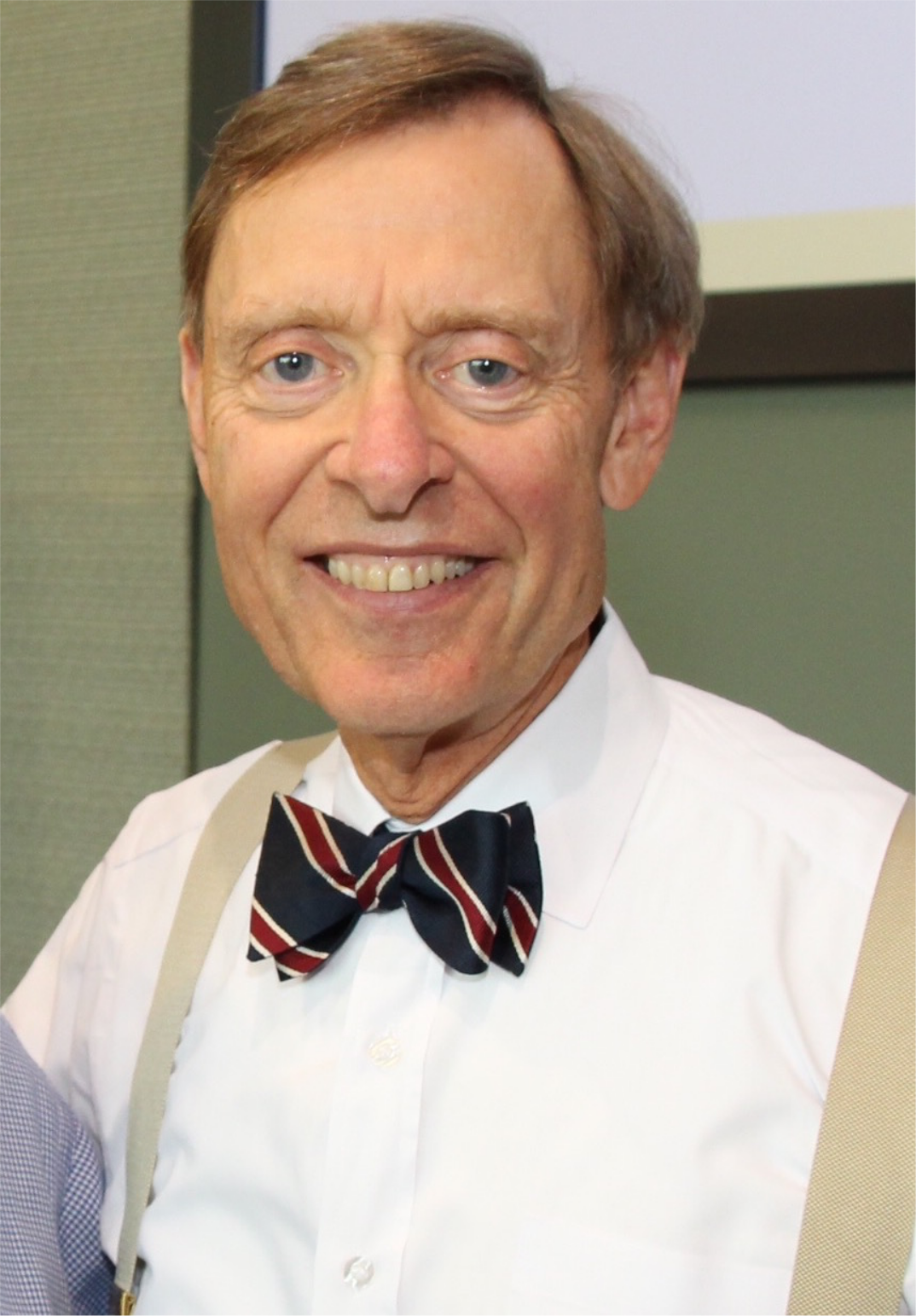

16th President of Washburn University
- In office July 1, 1997 – September 30, 2022
- Preceded by: Hugh L. Thompson
- Succeeded by: Marshall Meek (interim)

Personal details
- Born: September 20, 1946 (age 79) Tipton, Oklahoma
- Spouse: Susan
- Education: University of Oklahoma (BS, MS, PhD)
- Profession: Academic administrator

Jerry B. Farley (born September 20, 1946) is a retired American academic administrator and educator serving as the 16th president of Washburn University from 1997 to 2022. Since graduating college in 1968, Farley has served in various administrative positions at the University of Oklahoma ("OU" or "Oklahoma") and Oklahoma State University–Stillwater ("Oklahoma State").

== Early life and education ==
Farley was born in Tipton, Oklahoma. He graduated from the University of Oklahoma in 1968 with a bachelor of science in finance and accounting. In 1972, Farley received his master's degree in 1977, and his doctorate in 1986.

== Career ==
After graduating from OU, Farley began his nearly thirty-year career at OU as a controller. In 1981, Farley became OU's associate vice president for administration before leaving for Oklahoma State to become Vice President for Business & Administration in 1986. Between 1989 and 1997, Farley served in two vice president roles at the OU.

=== Washburn University ===
On July 1, 1997, Farley began his new position as Washburn University's 16th president. Since his first year in 1997, Farley has led Washburn to the construction of more than 10 new buildings, including the Kansas Bureau of Investigation Laboratory that was completed in 2015, and acquired the Washburn Institute of Technology from Topeka Public Schools in 2008. Besides the construction or acquiring schools, Farley has seen enrollment increase since 1997. He also saw the women's basketball team win the 2005 NCAA Division II Championship.

Farley is mostly known around the state of Kansas for his bowtie.

Farley retired September 30, 2022, taking on the status of president emeritus.
