= Shirley M. Jones =

American politician

Shirley Marie Jones (November 9, 1939 – March 20, 2016) was an American politician and parks and recreation employee.

Born in Chicago, Illinois, Jones went to Creiger Vocational High School, Crane High School, and George Williams College in Chicago. Jones worked for the Chicago Park District as a supervisor and administrator. From 1989 to 2003, Jones served in the Illinois House of Representatives and was a Democrat. She died in Chicago.
