= Patricia Bailey (Illinois politician) =

American politician

Patricia Bailey is a former American politician who served in the Illinois House of Representatives from 2003 to 2005.

== Early life and education ==
Born in Chicago, Illinois, Bailey received her bachelor's degree in social work from the University of Chicago and did graduate work at National Louis University.

== Career ==
Prior to entering politics, Bailey was a probation officer. In 2002, Bailey was elected to the Illinois House of Representatives as a Democrat. Bailey received an unsuccessful primary challenge in 2004 from former death row inmate Aaron Patterson. According to the Chicago Tribune, Bailey's 2004 campaign was "heavily financed by Chicago-area law-enforcement groups".

=== Residency controversy ===
In 2005, Bailey was found to be living somewhere other than in the 6th District she claimed. She was found guilty of voter fraud and perjury and was forced to resign from the Illinois General Assembly. Bailey was succeeded in her position by fellow Democrat Esther Golar.

In 2013, she received two years probation for listing a fake address on candidate and voter registration documents.
