= Farley, Derbyshire =

Hamlet in Derbyshire, England

Coordinates: 53.1555°N 1.5617°W

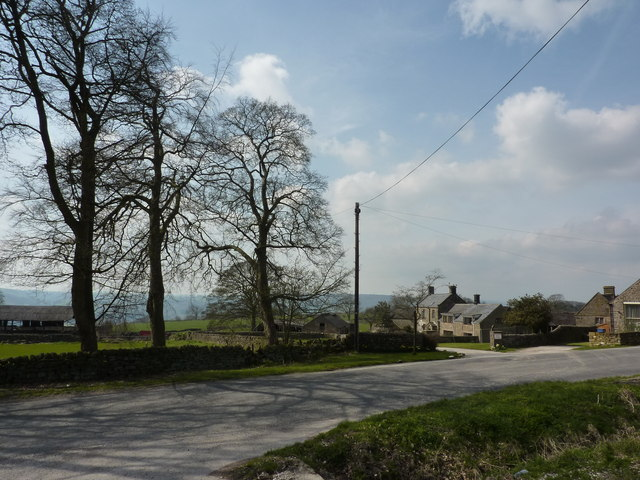
Street of Farley hamlet

Farley is a hamlet in the Derbyshire Dales district, in the English county of Derbyshire. It is near the town of Matlock. The nearest main road is the A6 road.
