= Farnley Hall, North Yorkshire =

Stately home in Yorkshire, England

Coordinates: 53.92153°N 1.67241°W

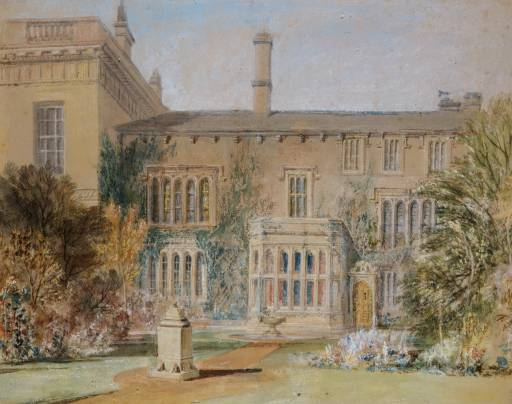
Farnley Hall as depicted by J. M. W. Turner in 1815

Farnley Hall is a stately home in Farnley, North Yorkshire, England. It is located near Otley. The original early seventeenth-century house was added to in the 1780s by John Carr, who also designed Harewood House. The hall is now a Grade I listed building.

The house consists of an 18th-century square block with earlier and later L-shaped wings at the rear and is built of coursed squared gritstone and ashlar with stone slate and lead roofs.

== History ==
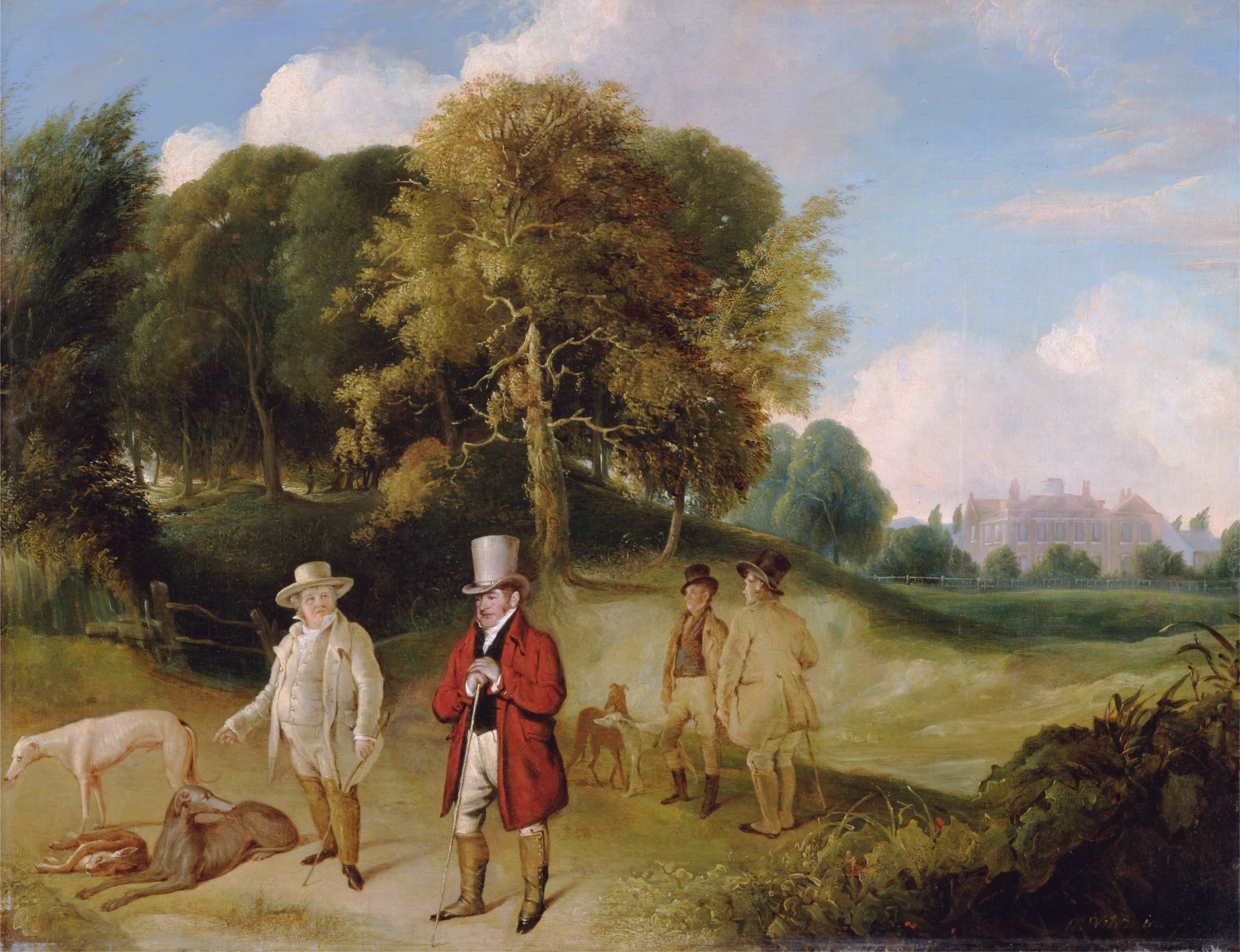
J. M. W. Turner and Walter Fawkes at Farnley Hall

Farnley hall was occupied in the 1780s by Francis Fawkes. After his death in 1786, Farnley Hall was inherited by distant relative Walter Hawkesworth of Hawksworth Hall, who adopted the surname Fawkes by royal licence and commissioned John Carr to build the new range alongside the old. When Walter Fawkes died in 1792 the hall passed to his son, also Walter Hawkesworth, who also adopted the surname Fawkes, and was known as Walter Ramsden Fawkes. He was MP for Yorkshire in 1806 and was High Sheriff of Yorkshire for 1823. During his tenure a regular visitor was the Victorian artist and philosopher John Ruskin, who was taken with the enormous collection of paintings by J. M. W. Turner, a close friend of the Ramsden Fawkes. Between 1808 and 1824 Farnley was a second home to Turner. Ramsden Fawkes owned over 250 Turner watercolours and six large oil paintings. A selection of Turner's works from the Farnley Hall collection were sold in 1890 for £25,000.

Frederick Hawksworth Fawkes of Farnley Hall was High Sheriff for 1932. During the Second World War the hall served as a maternity hospital.

Nicholas Horton-Fawkes owned and carefully restored the house until his death in 2011. Horton-Fawkes served as President of the Turner Society. Guy Fawkes was related to the Fawkes of Farnley.

== See also ==
- Grade I listed buildings in North Yorkshire (district)
- Listed buildings in Farnley, North Yorkshire
