= Farnley, North Yorkshire =

Village and civil parish in North Yorkshire, England

Coordinates: 53°55′36″N 1°40′20″W

Farnley
- Location within North Yorkshire
- Population: 338 (2011)
- OS grid reference: SE215479
- Civil parish: Farnley
- Unitary authority: North Yorkshire
- Ceremonial county: North Yorkshire
- Region: Yorkshire and the Humber
- Country: England
- Sovereign state: United Kingdom
- Post town: OTLEY
- Postcode district: LS21
- Dialling code: 01943
- Police: North Yorkshire
- Fire: North Yorkshire
- Ambulance: Yorkshire
- UK Parliament: Skipton and Ripon

Farnley is a village and civil parish in the county of North Yorkshire, England, near Otley, West Yorkshire. The name "Farnley" indicates that the village was first established in an area heavy with ferns. It is mentioned in the 1086 Domesday Book as Fernelai and Fernelie.

From 1974 to 2023 it was part of the Borough of Harrogate, it is now administered by the unitary North Yorkshire Council.

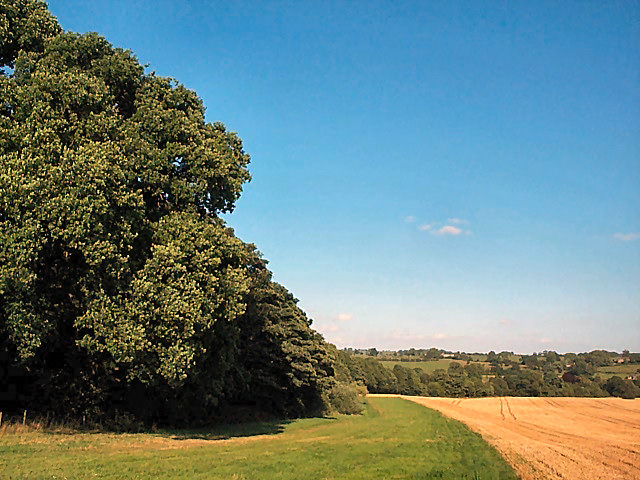
Part of the Farnley Estate

To the south of the village lies Farnley Hall, a stately home built by John Carr. The house has a rich history, being associated with names such as Fairfax, Cromwell, and Turner. A selection of Turner's works from the Farnley Hall collection were sold in 1890 for £25,000.

The primary school in Farnley is occasionally used as a location for filming the soap opera Emmerdale.

When found as a surname the most popular is Fearnley; other surnames related to the area are Farnely, Farnley and Fernleigh.

== See also ==
- Listed buildings in Farnley, North Yorkshire
