= William F. Farley =

American businessman (b. 1942)

William F. Farley (born October 10, 1942) is an American businessman, financier and philanthropist. He is the sole owner of Farley Industries, a private equity firm based in Chicago, and a co-owner of the Chicago White Sox. For 15 years (1985–99), he was the chairman and CEO of Fruit of the Loom until August 30, 1999. He is currently the founder, CEO and majority owner of Zrii, a multilevel marketing company based in Salt Lake City.

== Early life and education ==
Farley is the elder of two children born to working-class Catholic parents of Irish descent in Pawtucket, Rhode Island. He was the son of John Farley, a postal worker and part-time musician, and Barbara Farley, a receptionist.

Farley attended grade school at St. Leo's School in Pawtucket and later became a recruited high school athlete and student at St. Raphael Academy, his father's high school. He graduated from St. Raphael's in 1960. He graduated from Bowdoin College in Brunswick, Maine in 1964, where he majored in government and got an academic scholarship. At Bowdoin, he was a varsity athlete in football, swimming, and baseball.

== Professional career ==
=== Early years ===
After graduating from Bowdoin, Farley traveled across the U.S. and Mexico for six months, eventually settling in Los Angeles, California, where he sold Collier's Encyclopedia door to door. Within two years he was nominated as the company's leading salesman and appointed head of training for the national sales force.

=== NL Industries and Lehman Brothers ===
After attending Boston College Law School, Farley moved to New York City, where he took a job in the mergers and acquisitions division of NL Industries, a manufacturing company with a number of subsidiaries. At NL Industries, Farley did analysis on potential acquisition targets and rose to director of long range planning and acquisitions. In 1972, Farley was transferred to Chicago, where he functioned as the regional manager of NL Industries' metals division.

=== Farley Industries ===
In 1976, while Farley was working at Lehman Brothers, NL Industries was searching for a potential buyer for Anaheim Citrus Products Co., a small subsidiary that produced pectin, a thickening agent used in foods and other products. In October 1976, at age 34, he executed his first leveraged buyout for almost two million dollars. To facilitate the buyout, Farley founded Farley Industries, a private holdings company headquartered in the Sears Tower in Chicago. After six months, Farley had raised the funds for the buyout by half a million dollars of loans and notes borrowed against the company assets.

Within two years after the buyout, Farley had doubled Anaheim Citrus sales. In 1977, Farley purchased Baumfolder Corporation, a struggling manufacturing company, using funds from equipment sales at Anaheim Citrus. Farley quit Lehman Brothers and moved to Ohio to oversee the Baumfolder turnaround. He later sold Baumfolder to its employees for $10 million.

In 1982, Farley purchased NL Metals, the same group he used to run at NL. Farley Industries soon encompassed numerous companies within the manufacturing, mining and apparel industries. The largest acquisition was Northwest Industries for almost one-and-a-half billion dollars in July, 1985. By the late 1980s, Farley Industries had 50,000 employees and nearly four billion dollars in annual sales.

=== West Point Pepperell ===
In 1988, Farley completed a hostile takeover of West Point Pepperell, Inc., a textile company that had been family-owned in West Point, Georgia, and surrounding communities for more than 100 years. Farley financed his purchase of the absolute majority of the company through bank debt and high-yield bonds. Less than four years later, the company filed for bankruptcy, and Farley resigned.

=== Fruit of the Loom ===
Although Farley eventually sold most businesses within the Farley/Northwest Holding Corp. conglomerate, he kept Fruit of the Loom Inc. In March 1987, he completed a multimillion dollar public offering of Fruit of the Loom shares.

During his tenure at Fruit of the Loom Farley, the majority of Fruit of the Loom's manufacturing was moved outside of the US. In 1998 a class-action lawsuit by a New England–based health care employees pension fund alleged that Farley had misled investors to engage in insider trading. Farley served as president and CEO of Fruit of the Loom from 1985 to 1999, when he was forced to retire by the board of directors.

=== Zrii, LLC ===
In May 2007, Farley launched "Zrii, LLC", a multi-level marketing health and beauty company based out of Salt Lake City, Utah. Zrii, a Sanskrit word which means "light, luster, splendor, and prosperity", was endorsed by lifestyle guru Deepak Chopra and the Chopra Center for Wellbeing. The basis of its namesake product was a juice extracted from the amalaki fruit, which is grown exclusively in India at the base of the Himalayas.

In February 2009, 35 employees staged a walkout of Zrii headquarters and demanded that Farley resign.. In December 2009, Farley won a settlement agreement with LifeVantage Corporation, where many of his former employees were hired.

== Management style ==
Farley dedicated three million dollars a year to programs at his subsidiaries that encouraged physical fitness, good nutrition, and smoking cessation. He traveled to work sites and solicited employees' opinions about the quality of their food and facilities, making improvements as suggested by employees.

Farley installed baseball fields, tracks, and other fitness facilities at plants and factories.

== Politics ==
In 2016, he donated over $10,000 to the Donald Trump Victory fund.

== Philanthropic activity ==
A firm believer in education, Farley has contributed millions of dollars to his alma maters. His largest single contribution was a three-and-a-half million dollars gift to Bowdoin College in 1984, which resulted in Farley Field House, an indoor athletic facility with a track, indoor tennis courts, and spectator areas. He also founded scholarship programs for students at Boston College Law School, and made a donation to endow the William F. Farley Chair at the law school.

In May 1996, Farley made a donation to his high school, St. Raphael Academy, which went toward science and computer resources, tuition assistance, and the athletic department. In 1998 and in honor of Farley's contributions to the school, the West Annex Building at St. Raphael was renamed Barbara Farley Hall, in honor of Farley's mother.

Farley has made numerous contributions over the years to the American Heart Association, and he's been a donor to and board member of various civic and cultural organizations in his adopted hometown of Chicago, Illinois (including the Goodman Theatre, the Lyric Opera of Chicago, and the Chicago Council on Foreign Relations). He has also sat on the board of directors for the Horatio Alger Association of Distinguished Americans.

== Awards and honors ==
- 1984: Farley was recognized as Outstanding Business Graduate of the Year by the Boston College Law School Alumni Association.
- 1986: Farley received the Horatio Alger Association of Distinguished Americans award. The award was given to "community leaders who demonstrate individual initiative and a commitment to excellence, as exemplified by remarkable achievements accomplished through honesty, hard work, self-reliance and perseverance over adversity."
- 1988: Farley was inducted into the Rhode Island Heritage Hall of Fame; he was also honored by the Boys & Girls Clubs of America as a Business/Community Honoree of the Year.
- 1997: Honored by the Ireland-U.S. Council for Commerce and Industry for outstanding achievement for his work in economics, business, and commercial activity. He also received the White House's Presidential Award for Entrepreneurial Excellence.
- 2008: Farley was honored with a Freedom Award from America's Freedom Festival at Provo at Provo.

== Personal life ==
In the 1980s, Farley became a minority owner of the Chicago White Sox. Farley was an active member in the Young Presidents' Organization; he has been a member of the World Presidents Organization as of late 90s. He has also been a member of the Chicago Club and the University Associates of Northwestern University.
