= Miriam S. Farley =

American editor

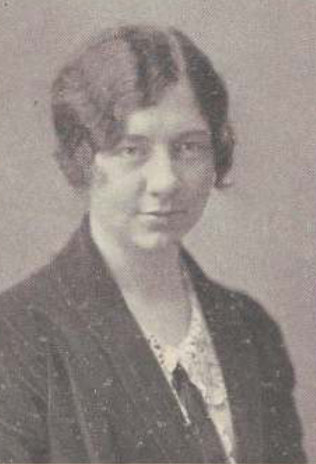
- Miriam S. Farley, from the 1927 yearbook of Mount Holyoke College
- Born: Miriam Southwell Farley; January 13, 1907; Pennsylvania, U.S.
- Died: March 4, 1975 (age 68); Bloomington, Indiana, U.S.
- Occupations: Political scientist, editor, writer
- Known for: Work on Far Eastern relations and Japanese postwar labor
- Notable work: "America's Stake in the Far East"

Miriam Southwell Farley (January 13, 1907 – March 4, 1975) was an American political scientist on the staff of the Institute of Pacific Relations. She was editor of Far Eastern Survey in the 1940s. From 1956 through the 1960s, she was managing editor at Indiana University Press.

== Early life and education ==
Farley was born in Pennsylvania and raised in Wilkes-Barre and Susquehanna, the daughter of Joseph Waldron Farley and June Wynona Southwell Farley. Her father died in 1915. Her grandfather Harvey N. Farley served a term in the Pennsylvania legislature. She graduated from Wyoming Seminary in 1923, where she excelled in Latin, and from Mount Holyoke College in 1927. She was a member of Phi Beta Kappa. She pursued further studies in international relations with Parker Moon at Columbia University.

== Career ==
Farley was a research associate at the Institute of Pacific Relations beginning in 1933. She was editor of Far Eastern Survey in the 1940s. Her conclusions about Japan's wartime economic status were regularly summarized and reported in newspapers.

In 1940, she spoke at an alumnae conference at Mount Holyoke College. In 1945, she spoke on a panel of Far East experts at Wellesley College. After World War II, she worked in the Occupation government in Japan. She testified before a Senate subcommittee in 1952, and "vigorously denied" any pro-Communist bias in her editorial work.

Farley moved to Indiana in the 1950s. She started as a production editor at Indiana University Press in 1956. In 1967 she spoke about Chinese history at a local League of Women Voters meeting in Indiana.

== Publications ==
In addition to her many contributions to Far Eastern Survey, Farley's research appeared in the journals Current History, Pacific Affairs, and The New York Review of Books.

- "Russia Warms to the League" (1934)
- "The Current Boom in the Japanese Steel Industry" (1935)
- "Japan as Consumer of American Cotton" (1935)
- "Sugar: A Commodity in Chaos" (1935)
- "Philippine Independence and Agricultural Readjustment" (1936)
- America's Stake in the Far East (1937)
- "Railway Strategy in China, New Style" (1937, with Chen Han-seng)
- "Japan's Unsolved Tenancy Problem" (1937)
- American Far Eastern policy and the Sino-Japanese war (1938)
- "War and the Japanese Budget" (1938)
- The problem of Japanese trade expansion in the post-war situation (1939)
- "The Impact of War on Japan's Foreign Trade" (1939)
- "The National Mobilization Controversy in Japan" (1939)
- "Japan Between Two Wars" (1939)
- "America Maneuvers in Asia" (1941)
- "Strategic Imports from Southeast Asia" (1942)
- "India: A Political Primer" (1942)
- "The Simla Conference" (1945)
- "Labor Policy in Occupied Japan" (1947)
- "Crisis in Korea" and "Crisis in Korea: Second Phase" (1950)
- Aspects of Japan's Labor Problems (1950)
- "Japan and the West" (1950)
- "Japan and US: Post-Treaty Problems" (1952)
- United States Relations With Southeast Asia With Special Reference to Indochina 1950–1955 (1955)
- "Kierkegaard in English" (1966)

== Personal life ==
Farley died in 1975, at the age of 68, in Bloomington, Indiana. She left behind a legacy of scholarly contributions to political science and a body of work that continues to inform studies of U.S.–Asia relations.
