= Bruce A. Farley =

American politician

Bruce A. Farley (born April 12, 1943) was an Illinois politician.

Born in Los Angeles, California, Farley served in the United States Air Force Reserves, Farley received his bachelor's degree from Loyola University Chicago. Farley lived in Chicago, Illinois. From 1973 to 1993, Farley served in the Illinois House of Representatives and was a Democrat. He then served in the Illinois State Senate from 1993 to 1999. Farley has 2 children and was married to his wife, Karen who was a school teacher, for 60+ years until her death in January 2021.

He currently has both of his legs amputated due to diabetes.

In 1999, Farley pleaded guilty in United States District Court for a false payroll scheme involving the Cook County, Illinois Treasurer.
